= Isesaki Domain =

Feudal domain in Edo period Japan

Isesaki Domain 伊勢崎藩
- under Tokugawa shogunate Japan
- 1601–1871
- Capital: Isesaki jin'ya
  - Type: Daimyō
- Historical era: Edo period
  - Established: 1601
  - Disestablished: 1871
- Today part of: part of Gunma Prefecture

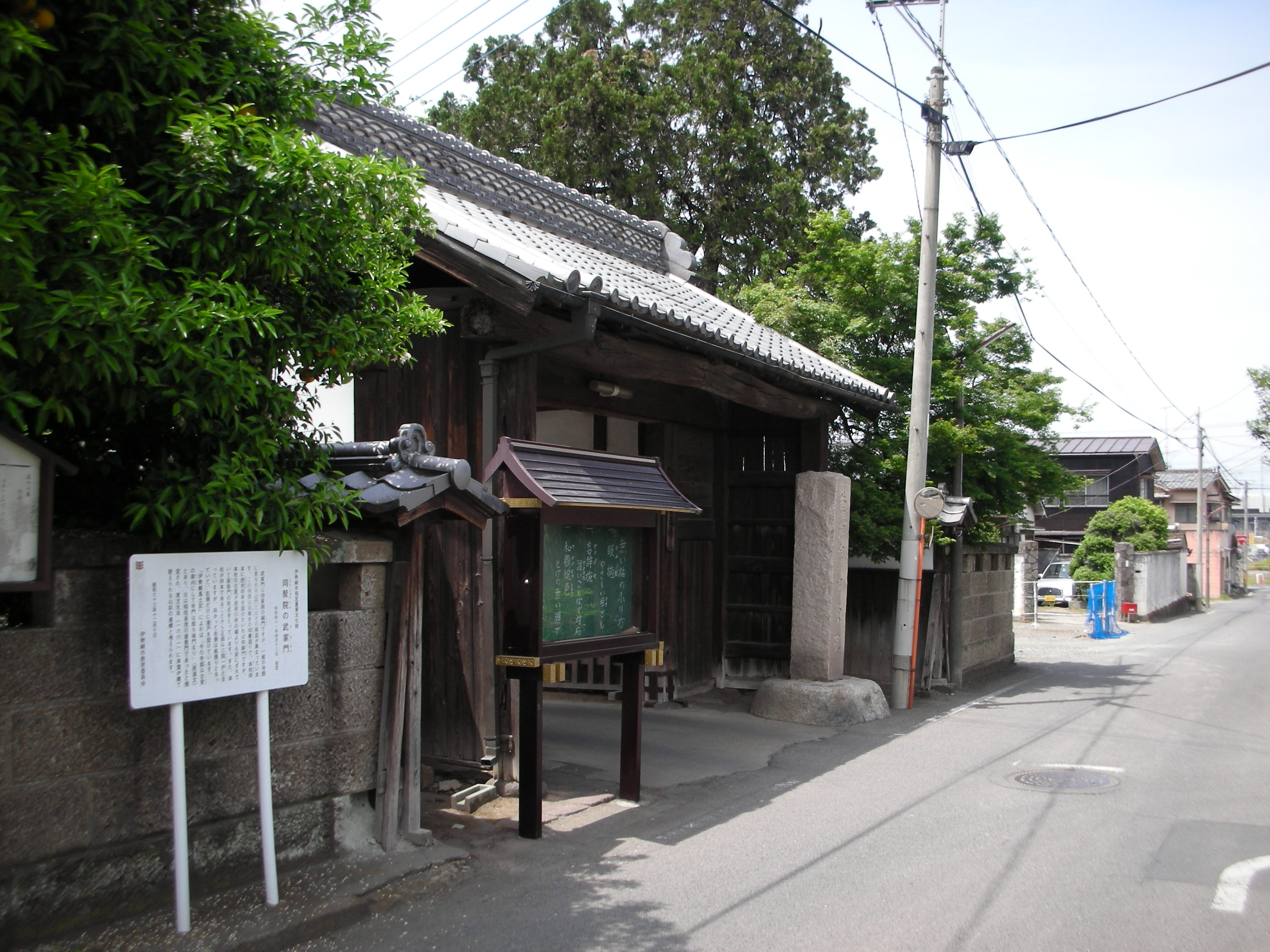
Surviving gate of Isesaki jin'ya, headquarters of Isesaki Domain

Isesaki Domain (伊勢崎藩, Isesaki-han) was a feudal domain under the Tokugawa shogunate of Edo period Japan, located in Kōzuke Province (modern-day Gunma Prefecture), Japan. It was centered on Isesaki jin'ya in what is now part of the city of Isesaki, Gunma. Isesaki was ruled through most of its history by a junior branch of the Sakai clan.

== History ==
Isesaki Domain was originally created in 1601 for Inagaki Nagashige, a hatamoto formerly in the service of the Imagawa clan who had transferred his allegiance to Tokugawa Ieyasu. After Tokugawa Ieyasu took control over the Kantō region in 1590, he assigned estates with revenues of 3000 koku to Inagaki Nagashige in Kōzuke Province, and entrusted him with the defense of Ogo Castle. He was awarded additional estates in 1601, following Ieyasu’s defeat at the hands of Uesugi Kagekatsu at Aizu, which elevated him to the rank of daimyō. His son was transferred in 1616, and Isesaki was thereafter ruled by three junior branches of the Sakai clan until the end of the Edo period.

During the Bakumatsu period, forces of Iseskai Domain played a role in the suppression of the Tengutō Rebellion; however the next-to-last daimyo, Sakai Tadatsuyo was quick to join the imperial side in the Boshin War. After the end of the conflict, with the abolition of the han system in July 1871, Isesaki Domain became "Isesaki Prefecture", which later became part of Gunma Prefecture.

The domain had a population of 1964 samurai in 520 households per a census in 1763.

== Holdings at the end of the Edo period ==
Unlike most domains in the han system, which consisted of several discontinuous territories calculated to provide the assigned kokudaka, based on periodic cadastral surveys and projected agricultural yields, Isesaki was a relatively compact territory.

- Kōzuke Province
  - 18 villages in Sai District
  - 30 villages in Nawa District

== List of daimyōs ==
#	Name	Tenure	Courtesy title	Court Rank	kokudaka
Inagaki clan (fudai) 1601–1616
1	Inagaki Nagashige (稲垣長茂	1601–1612	-none-	-unknown-	10,000 koku
2	Inagaki Shigetsuna (稲垣重綱)	1612–1616	Settsu-no-kami (摂津守)	Lower 5th (従五 位下)	10,000 koku
Sakai clan (fudai) 1600–1616
1	Sakai Tadayo (酒井忠世)	1616–1617	Uta-no-kami (雅楽頭); Jijū (侍従)	Lower 4th (従四位下)	52,000 koku
Sakai clan (fudai) 1636–1662
1	Sakai Tadayoshi (酒井忠能)	1636–1662	Hyūga-no-kami(日向守)	Lower 5th (従五位下)	22,500 koku
Sakai clan (fudai) 1617–1871
1	Sakai Tadahiro (酒井忠寛)	1617–1619	Shimotsuke-no-kami (下野守)	Lower 5th (従五位下)	20,000 koku
2	Sakai Tadatsugu (酒井忠告)	1745–1749	Shimotsuke-no-kami (下野守)	Lower 5th (従五位下)	20,000 koku
3	Sakai Tadaharu (酒井忠温)	1749–1781	Suruga-no-kami (駿河守)	Lower 5th (従五位下)	20,000 koku
4	Sakai Tadaakira (酒井忠哲)	1781–1800	Shimotsuke-no-kami (下野守)	Lower 5th (従五位下)	20,000 koku
5	Sakai Tadayoshi (酒井忠寧)	1800–1825	Shinano-no-kami (信濃守)	Lower 5th (従五位下)	20,000 koku
6	Sakai Tadakata (酒井忠良)	1800–1839	Iga-no-kami (伊賀守)	Lower 5th (従五位下)	20,000 koku
7	Sakai Tadatsune (酒井忠恒)	1839–1840	Shima-no-kami (志摩守)	Lower 5th (従五位下)	20,000 koku
8	Sakai Tadatsuyo (酒井忠強)	1840–1846	Shimotsuke-no-kami (下野守)	Lower 5th (従五位下)	20,000 koku
9	Sakai Tadaaki (酒井忠彰)	1847–1860	Shimotsuke-no-kami (下野守)	Lower 5th (従五位下)	20,000 koku
