= Obama Domain =

Feudal domain of the Edo period of Japan

Obama Domain 小浜藩
- under Tokugawa shogunate Japan
- 1600–1871
- Capital: Obama Castle
- Area
  - Coordinates: 35°30′14.3″N 135°44′45″E
- Government
  - Type: Daimyō
- Historical era: Edo period
  - Established: 1600
  - Kyōgoku: 1601
  - Sakai: 1634
  - Disestablished: 1871
- Today part of: Fukui Prefecture

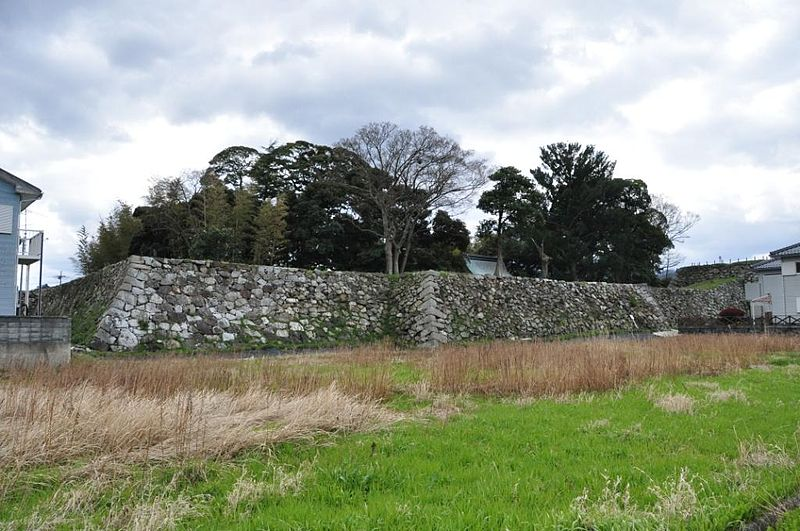
Ruins of Obama Castle

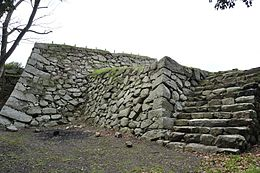
Wall corner of Obama Castle

The Obama Domain (小浜藩, Obama-han) was a Fudai feudal domain of the Edo period of Japan. It is located in Wakasa Province, in the Hokuriku region of the island Honshū. The domain was centered at Obama Castle, located in the center of what is now the city of Obama in Fukui Prefecture.

== History ==
Obama was an important seaport from ancient times due to its proximity to the capital of Japan. In the Sengoku period, the Wakasa Province was controlled by a number of local warlords, including a branch of the Takeda clan. Under Toyotomi Hideyoshi, it had been awarded to Hideyoshi's nephew, Kinoshita Katsutoshi. Kinoshita did not participate in the decisive Battle of Sekigahara in 1600 and was deprived of Obama by the victorious Tokugawa Ieyasu because he had not actively supported the winning side.

=== Under the Kyōgoku clan ===
With the establishment of the Tokugawa shogunate, Tokugawa Ieyasu awarded all of the Wakasa Province to Kyōgoku Takatsugu as a reward for his leadership during the Siege of Ōtsu. In the same week as the Battle of Sekigahara, Takatsugu failed to hold Ōtsu Castle; but the outcome at Sekigahara marginalized any adverse consequences of his defeat. By moving Takatsugu to Obama, the shogunate effectively acknowledged that Takatsugu's role in the victory at Sekigahara was critical. The siege took men away from the massed array of forces the Tokugawa faced at Sekigahara, which meant that the attackers at Ōtsu were unavailable to augment the anti-Tokugawa army at Sekigahara.

In 1607, Takatsugu's son Tadataka married the fourth daughter of Shōgun Tokugawa Hidetada. Two years later, Tadataka became daimyō when his father died in 1609. Tadataka was transferred to the Matsue Domain in Izumo Province in 1634.

Under the Kyōgoku clan, Obama was rebuilt into a jōkamachi and a center for the kitamaebune coastal trade network between Ezo and the Kansai region. The Kyōgoku also began construction of Obama Castle, but it was still uncompleted at the time of their transfer.

=== Under the Sakai clan ===
In 1634, Sakai Tadakatsu from a cadet branch of the Sakai clan at the Kawagoe Domain in Musashi Province became daimyō of the Obama Domain. Tadakatsu was one of the shogunate's top officials who served on the rōjū council, and later as its head, or Tairō. The kokudaka of the domain under his tenure reached 123,500 koku. Tadakatsu did much to establish the domain's governance and to ensure its strength and stability. He implemented a taxation system and installed town magistrates (machi-bugyō) and local governors. The Sakai clan continued to rule Obama for fourteen generations over 237 years to the end of the Edo period.

He was succeeded in the domain by his fourth son, Sakai Tadanao. In 1668, Tadanao reduced the domain by creating the 10,000 koku Awa-Katsuyama Domain out of the domain's exclaves in Awa Province for his nephew. He also separated out the 10,000 koku Tsuruga Domain in 1682 from the domain's territory in Echizen Province for his son. After another 3000 koku was given to his fifth son Sakai Tadane, the domain's kokudaka was reduced to 103,500 koku.

Under the Sakai, the domain enjoyed relative peace and stability. However, a flood ravaged the domain in 1735 and famine set in, as it did in many other areas at this time. The peasants sought aid from their lord, but their cries went unheeded for a long time. In 1770, there was a peasant revolt. Efforts were made to shore up the domain's finances and to relieve the peasant's suffering, but famine struck again several decades later in 1836.

The seventh Sakai daimyō, Sakai Takamochi, held a number of important posts within the Tokugawa shogunate, including Osaka-jō dai and Kyoto Shoshidai, and the 10th Sakai daimyō, Sakai Takayuki was also Kyoto Shoshidai and a rōjū.

The twelfth Sakai daimyō, Sakai Tadaaki, also served as Kyoto Shoshidai and worked with Ii Naosuke to implement the Kōbu gattai between the shogunate and the Imperial Court and suppress the Mito rebellion led by Takeda Kōunsai and other pro–Sonnō jōi partisans in Kyoto. He retired in 1862, but returned to power under the new name Sakai Tadayoshi after the defeat of the shogunate in the Battle of Toba-Fushimi in the 1868 Boshin War to lead the domain into the pro-imperial cause. He was appointed imperial governor of Wakasa under the new Meiji government, ruling until the abolition of the han system in 1871.

== Bakumatsu period holdings ==
Unlike most fudai domains in the han system that consisted of discontinuous territories calculated to provide the assigned kokudaka, based on periodic cadastral surveys and projected agricultural yields, Obama Domain controlled all of the province of Wakasa, and some scattered small holdings in neighbouring Echizen and Omi.

- Wakasa Province
  - 122 villages in Onyū District
  - 73 villages in Ōi District
  - 58 villages in Mikata District
- Echizen Province
  - 5 villages in Nanjō District
  - 6 villages in Imadate District
  - 38 villages in Tsuruga District
- Ōmi Province
  - 5 villages in Takashima District

== List of daimyō ==
#	Name	Tenure	Courtesy title	Court Rank	kokudaka
Kyōgoku clan (fudai) 1600–1634
1	Kyōgoku Takatsugu (京極高次)	1600–1609	Wakasa-no-kami (若狭守), Sangi (参議)	Junior 3rd Rank (従三位)	85,000 koku
2	Kyōgoku Tadataka (京極忠高)	1609–1634	Sakonoe-gon-shōshō (左少将)	Junior 4th Rank, Lower Grade (従四位下)	85,000 -> 92,000 koku
Sakai clan (fudai) 1634–1871
1	Sakai Tadakatsu (酒井忠勝)	1634–1656	Sanuki-no-kami (讃岐守), Sakonoe-gon-shōshō (左少将)	Junior 4th Rank, Upper Grade (従四位上)	85,000 koku
2	Sakai Tadanao (酒井忠直)	1656–1682	Shuri-no-daifu (修理大夫), Jijū (侍従)	Junior 4th Rank, Lower Grade (従四位下)	126,500 -> 103,500 koku
3	Sakai Tadataka (酒井忠隆)	1682–1686	Tōtōmi-no-kami (遠江守)	Junior 4th Rank, Lower Grade (従四位下)	103,500 koku
4	Sakai Tadasono (酒井忠囿)	1686–1706	Yukie-no-suke (靭負佐)	Junior 4th Rank, Lower Grade (従四位下)	103,500 koku
5	Sakai Tadaoto (酒井忠音)	1705–1735	Shuri-no-daifu (修理大夫), Jijū (侍従)	Junior 4th Rank, Lower Grade (従四位下)	103,500 koku
6	Sakai Tadaakira (酒井忠存)	1735–1740	Bingo-no-kami (備後守)	Junior 5th Rank, Lower Grade (従五位下)	103,500 koku
7	Sakai Tadamochi (酒井忠用)	1740–1757	Shuri-no-daifu (修理大夫), Jijū (侍従)	Junior 4th Rank, Lower Grade (従四位下)	103,500 koku
8	Sakai Tadayoshi (酒井忠与)	1757–1762	Tōtōmi-no-kami (遠江守)	Junior 4th Rank, Lower Grade (従四位下)	103,500 koku'
9	Sakai Tadatsura (酒井忠貫)	1762–1806	Shuri-no-daifu (修理大夫), Jijū (侍従)	Junior 4th Rank, Lower Grade (従四位下)	103,500 koku
10	Sakai Tadayuki (酒井忠進)	1806–1828	Sanuki-no-kami (讃岐守), Jijū (侍従)	Junior 4th Rank, Lower Grade (従四位下)	103,500 koku
11	Sakai Tadayori (酒井忠順)	1828–1832	Shuri-no-daifu (修理大夫)	Junior 4th Rank, Lower Grade (従四位下)	103,500 koku
12	Sakai Tadaaki (酒井忠義)	1832–1862	Shuri-no-daifu (修理大夫), Sakonoe-gon-shōshō (左少将)	Junior 4th Rank, Upper Grade (従四位上)	103,500 koku
13	Sakai Tadauji (酒井忠氏)	1862–1868	Wakasa-no-kami (若狭守)	Junior 4th Rank, Lower Grade (従四位下)	103,500 koku
14	Sakai Tadatoshi (酒井忠禄)	1868–1871	Sakonoe-gon-shōshō (左少将)	Junior 4th Rank, Upper Grade (従四位上)	103,500 koku

=== Sakai Tadakatsu ===
Sakai Tadakatsu (酒井 忠勝; July 21, 1587 – August 25, 1662) was daimyō of the Fukaya Domain and then the Kawagoe Domain, before becoming the 1st Sakai daimyō of the Obama Domain. He was the son of Sakai Tadatoshi, a hereditary retainer of Tokugawa Ieyasu. He served Tokugawa Hidetada during the Siege of Ueda and later served Shōgun Tokugawa Iemitsu, who promoted him to rōjū in 1624. In 1634, he was transferred to Obama and completed the construction of Obama Castle. He retired from public life in 1656 and died in 1662. His grave is at the clan temple of Kuin-ji in Obama.

=== Sakai Tadanao ===
Sakai Tadanao (酒井忠直; May 5, 1630 – August 12, 1682) was the 2nd daimyō of the Obama Domain. He was the fourth son of Sakai Tadakatsu, and was given the courtesy title of Shuri-Daiyu in 1644. He was proclaimed heir in 1649 when his elder brother, Sakai Tadatomo was disinherited for unknown reasons and exiled to a distant exclave of the domain in Awa Province. He became daimyō on his father's retirement in 1656. In 1668, he reorganized the domain's exclave in Awa Province to create the 10,000 koku Awa-Katsuyama Domain for his nephew, Sakai Tadakuni. During his tenure, he continued the policies of his father in organizing the domain government and codifying its law, flood control, and new rice land development, as well as encouraging education and literature. He died in Obama in 1682. His wife was a daughter of Matsudaura Sadayori of the Iyo-Matsuyama Domain.

=== Sakai Tadataka ===
Sakai Tadataka (酒井忠隆; March 27, 1651 – May 13, 1686) was the 3rd daimyō of the Obama Domain. He was the eldest son of Sakai Tadanao, and served as a sōshaban in 1681. He became daimyō on his father's death in 1682, as which time he separated a 10,000 koku holding for his younger brother Sakai Tadashige in accordance with his father's will, forming the Tsuruga Domain. His courtesy title was Tōtōmi-no-kami. He died at Obama in 1686. His wife was a daughter of Shimazu Tsunahisa of Satsuma Domain.

=== Sakai Tadasono ===
Sakai Tadasono (酒井忠囿; January 11, 1671 – October 14, 1706) was the 4th daimyō of the Obama Domain. He was the eldest son of Sakai Tadataka, and became daimyō on his father's death in 1686. His courtesy title was Yukie-no-suke. In 1697, he was ordered by the shogunate to supervise the transfer of power of Tsuyama Domain from the Mōri clan to Matsudaira Naoakira, formerly of the Ōno Domain. He died at Obama in 1706 without heir. His wife was a daughter of Doi Toshimasu of the Karasu Domain.

=== Sakai Tadaoto ===
Sakai Tadaoto (酒井忠音; December 9, 1691 – July 8, 1735) was the 5th daimyō of the Obama Domain. He was the younger son of Sakai Tadashige of Tsuruga Domain, and was adopted as heir by Sakai Tadasono on his deathbed in 1706. He was received in formal audience by Shōgun Tokugawa Tsunayoshi, and was confirmed as daimyō, receiving the courtesy title of Shuri-daifu the same year. From 1718 to 1722 he was appointed simultaneously as a sōshaban and jisha-bugyō. In 1723, he became Osaka-jō dai and his courtesy title was changed to Sanuki-no-kami and his court rank was increased from Lower 5th, Junior grade to Lower 4th, Junior grade. He was promoted to rōjū in 1728 and gained the additional courtesy title of Jijū. On July 7, 1735, he suddenly fell ill and died while in office the following day. His wife was a daughter of Arima Yorimoto of the Kurume Domain.

=== Sakai Tadaakira ===
Sakai Tadaakira (酒井忠存; November 18, 1720 – October 12, 1740) was the 6th daimyō of the Obama Domain. He was the third son of Sakai Tadaoto by a concubine. As both his legitimate elder brothers died in infancy, he became daimyō in 1735 on the death of his father. His courtesy name was Bingo-no-kami. He died in 1740 at the age of 21 without an heir.

=== Sakai Tadamochi ===
Sakai Tadamochi (酒井忠用; January 3, 1723 – October 21, 1775) was the 7th daimyō of the Obama Domain. He was the fifth son of Sakai Tadaoto by a concubine, and became daimyō in 1740 upon the death of his elder brother. His courtesy title was Shuri-daiyu, and his wife was a daughter of Matsudaira Sadanori of the Takada Domain. In 1741 he was appointed simultaneously as a sōshaban and jisha-bugyō, and later the same year, he became Osaka-jō dai. In 1747 his courtesy title was changed to Sanuki-no-kami and his court rank was increased from Lower 5th, Junior grade to Lower 4th, Junior grade. From 1752 to 1756 he was appointed Kyoto Shoshidai, and he added the title of Jijū to his honorifics. He retired from public office in 1757, and his title was changed to Sakyō-daifu. He died in 1775 without a male heir.

=== Sakai Tadayoshi ===
Sakai Tadayoshi (酒井忠与; August 26, 1721 – August 7, 1762) was the 8th daimyō of the Obama Domain. He became daimyō in 1757 on the retirement of his elder brother. His courtesy title was Tōtōmi-no-kami. He died in 1762.

=== Sakai Tadatsura ===
Sakai Tadatsura (酒井忠貫; December 26, 1752-March 1, 1806) was the 9th daimyō of the Obama Domain. He was the eldest son of Sakai Tadayoshi and was born at the clan residence in Edo. He became daimyō in 1762 on the death of his father, and was awarded the courtesy title ofShuri-daiyu and Lower 5th, Junior grade court rank the following year. His wife was the daughter of Date Munemura of the Sendai Domain; however, he later remarried to a daughter of the kuge Koga Michie and then a daughter of the kuge Ōinomikado Ienaga. From 1783, the domain was hit with crop failures and fell into severe debt. Despite these difficulties, his court rank advanced to Lower 4th, Junior grade in 1784. In 1792, he was ordered to bolster the defences of Nemuro after incursions by a French warship in violation of Japan's national isolation policy. He died in 1806.

=== Sakai Tadayuki ===
Sakai Tadayuki (酒井忠進; April 4, 1770 – March 12, 1828) was the 10th daimyō of the Obama Domain. He was the seventh son of Sakai Tadaka of Tsuruga Domain and was posthumously adopted as heir on the death of Sakai Tadatsura in 1806. His wife was a daughter of Okudaira Masashika of the Nakatsu Domain. In 1808, he became jisha-bugyō and from 1808 to 1815 served as Kyoto Shoshidai. In 1815, he was ordered to oversee the reconstruction of the 5-story pagoda at Nikkō Tōshō-gū, which had been destroyed by a fire. Later that year, he was promoted to rōjū, holding that post until his death in 1828.

=== Sakai Tadayori ===
Sakai Tadayori (酒井忠順; April 16, 1791 – February 24, 1853) was the 11th daimyō of the Obama Domain. He was the younger son of Sakai Tadatsura, but because of his youth at the time of his father's death, his uncle Sakai Takayuki from the Tsuruga Domain was made daimyō instead. The succession reverted to Tadayori on Takayuki's death in 1828. He inherited a domain with over 300,000 ryō in debt. Through fiscal reforms he was initially able to reduce this by 100,000 ryō, but the domain economy collapsed in 1833 due to crop failures. He resigned his office in 1834. His wife was a daughter of Matsudaira Sadakuni of the Iyo-Matsuyama Domain.

=== Sakai Tadaaki / Sakai Takatoshi ===
Sakai Tadaaki (酒井忠義; August 4, 1813 – December 5, 1873) was the 12th and the 14th daimyō of the Obama Domain. He was the fifth son of Sakai Tadayuki, and became daimyō in 1834 when Sakai Tadayori retired. His wife was a daughter of Matsudaiara Terunobu of the Takasaki Domain. In 1840, he was given the courtesy title of Wakasa-no-kami and Lower 4th, Junior grade court rank. In 1842, was appointed simultaneously as a sōshaban and jisha-bugyō. The following year he was appointed Kyoto Shoshidai and he added the title of Jijū to his honorific. He resigned as Kyoto Shoshidai in 1850 but was reappointed in 1858, and many of the events which occurred in Kyoto during the tumultuous Bakumatsu period occurred while he was at Kyoto. He resigned as Kyoto Shoshidai and daimyō in 1862 and went into retirement, changing his name to Tadatoshi (忠禄). He re-assumed his position as daimyō at the start of the Boshin War (following the defeat of the Tokugawa shogunate forces at the Battle of Toba-Fushimi) and defected to the Imperial side. In 1869, he was appointed imperial governor of Wakasa under the new Meiji government. He died in 1873.

=== Sakai Tadauji ===
Sakai Tadauji (酒井忠氏; February 11, 1835 – January 21, 1876) was the 13th daimyō of Obama Domain. He was the fourth son of a hatamoto and was adopted as heir to Sakai Tadaaki in 1853. He became daimyō in 1862 when Tadaaki was forced into retirement by the Ansei Purge. He maintained a pro-Tokugawa policy and was active in the suppression of the Mito rebellion in the area. With the start of the Boshin War, he sent forces to fight for Tokugawa during the Battle of Toba-Fushimi. However, following the defeat of the Tokugawa during that battle, he was pushed aside by Tadaaki, who resumed the title of daimyō and who had the support of the senior domain retainers. Takauji was forced into retirement under the guise of "illness" and died in 1876.

== See also ==
- List of han
