= Ogasawara Nagashige =

Japanese samurai daimyō

Ogasawara Nagashige (小笠原 長重; June 5, 1650 – September 19, 1732), also known as Sado-no-kami or Etchū-no-kami, was a Japanese samurai daimyō of the mid-Edo period.

In contrast with the tozama or outsider clans, the Ogasawara were identified as one of the fudai or insider daimyō clans which were hereditary vassals or allies of the Tokugawa.

== Shogunate official ==
Nagashige served the Tokugawa shogunate as its eleventh Kyoto shoshidai in the period spanning October 17, 1691, through May 15, 1702. He had previously been shogunate's magistrate or overseer of the country's temples and shrines (jisha-bugyō) from Genroku 3, the 3rd day of the 12th month, through Genroku 4, the 26th day of the 4th month (1691).

He was responsible for bringing Yamada Sōhen, a disciple of Sen Sōtan, to Edo to promulgate the practice of the Japanese tea ceremony.

== See also ==
- Ogasawara clan
