= Awa-Katsuyama Domain =

Kachiyama Domain (1869–1871) 加知山藩 Awa-Katsuyama Domain (1622–1869) 安房勝山藩
- Domain of Japan
- 1622–1871
- Capital: Katsuyama jin'ya
  - Type: Daimyō
- Historical era: Edo period
  - Established: 1622
  - Disestablished: 1871
Preceded by	Succeeded by
Awa Province	Kisarazu Prefecture
- Today part of: Chiba Prefecture

Awa-Katsuyama Domain (安房勝山藩, Awa-Katsuyama-han) was a feudal domain under the Tokugawa shogunate of Edo period Japan, located in Awa Province (modern-day Chiba Prefecture), Japan. It was centered in what is now part of the city of Kamogawa, Chiba.

== History ==
Most of the Bōsō Peninsula was controlled by the powerful Satomi clan during the Sengoku period. The Satomi fought numerous battles with the Later Hōjō clan of Odawara for control of the Kantō region. In 1580, Satomi Yoriyoshi built Tateyama Castle in southern Awa Province to guard the southern portion of his territories and increase his control over the entrance to Edo Bay. The castle is rebuilt by his son, Satomi Yoshiyasu in 1588, who also built a fortified residence, or jinya at Katsuyama, and what is now part of the city of Kamogawa to protect the northeastern approaches to Tateyama Castle. Following the Battle of Odawara in 1590, the Kantō region was assigned to Tokugawa Ieyasu, who confirmed the Satomi as daimyō of Awa and Kazusa Provinces, with revenues of 92,000 koku. Following the Battle of Sekigahara, Satomi Yoshiyasu also gained control of Kashima District in Hitachi Province, which increased his holdings to 122,000 koku. After his death in 1603, his territories were inherited by his son, Satomi Tadayoshi. However, Satomi Tadayoshi was related by marriage to Ōkubo Tadachika, and was implicated in the Ōkubo Nagayasu Incident of 1614, which the Tokugawa shogunate used as excuse to abolish Tateyama Domain and extinguish the Satomi clan.

In 1617, the Tokugawa shogunate established Naitō Kiyomasa as a fudai daimyō, splitting of 30,000 koku of the former Satomi territories centered at Katsuyama and was allowed to build a jin'ya fortified residence, but not a full castle. He was followed by his son Naitō Masakatsu, who ruled until 1629. Naitō Masakatsu's son Naitō Shigeyori resigned administration of the domain to assume the post of Osaka-jō dai; as his heirs were underage at the time of his death, the domain reverted to tenryō status.

In 1668, Sakai Tadakuni who had risen through the administrative ranks within the Tokugawa shogunate, gained the requisite 10,000 koku in revenue to become daimyō and was permitted to revive the defunct Awa-Katsuyama Domain. His descendants continued to rule Awa-Katsuyama Domain until the Meiji Restoration. With the abolition of the han system in July 1871, Awa-Katsuyama Domain briefly became “Katuyama Prefecture”, which later became part of Chiba Prefecture.

== List of daimyō ==
#	Name	Tenure	Courtesy title	Court Rank	kokudaka
Naitō clan (fudai) 1622–1629
1	Naitō Kiyomasa (内藤清政)	1622–1623	Shuri-no-suke (修理亮)	Lower 5th (従五位下)	30,000 koku
2	Naitō Masakatsu (内藤正勝)	1626–1629	none	none	30,000 koku
	tenryō	1629–1668			
Sakai clan (fudai) 1668–1871
1	Sakai Tadakuni (酒井忠国)	1668–1683	Yamato-no-kami (大和守)	Lower 5th (従五位下)	10,000 koku
2	Sakai Tadatane (酒井忠胤)	1683–1712	Echizen-no-kami(越前守)	Lower 5th (従五位下)	10,000 koku
3	Sakai Tadaatsu (酒井忠篤)	1712–1737	Echizen-no-kami (越前守)	Lower 5th (従五位下)	10,000 koku
4	Sakai Tadamoto (酒井忠大)	1737–1756	Yamato-no-kami (大和守)	Lower 5th (従五位下)	10,000 koku
5	Sakai Tadachika (酒井 忠鄰)	1756–1793	Echizen-no-kami (越前守)	Lower 5th (従五位下)	10,000 koku
6	Sakai Tadayori (酒井 忠和)	1793–1810	Yamato-no-kami (大和守)	Lower 5th (従五位下)	10,000 koku
7	Sakai Tadatsugu (酒井 忠嗣)	1810–1851	Echizen-no-kami (越前守)	Lower 5th (従五位下)	10,000 koku
8	Sakai Tadakazu (酒井 忠一)	1851–1860	Aki-no-kami (安芸守)	Lower 5th (従五位下)	10,000 koku
9	Sakai Tadayoshi (酒井 忠美)	1860–1871	Yamato-no-kami (大和守)	Lower 5th (従五位下)	12,000 koku
