= Tatsuno Domain =

Japanese feudal domain located in Harima Province

Tatsuno Domain 龍野藩
- under Tokugawa shogunate Japan
- 1617–1871
- Capital: Tatsuno Castle
- Area
  - Coordinates: 34°52′7.67″N 134°32′41.4″E
  - Type: Daimyō
- Historical era: Edo period
  - Established: 1617
  - Honda clan: 1617
  - Ogasawara clan: 1626
  - Okabe clan: 1633
  - Kyōgoku clan: 1637
  - Wakisaka: 1672
  - Disestablished: 1871
- Today part of: part of Hyōgo Prefecture

Location of Tatsuno Castle
Tatsuno Domain (Japan)

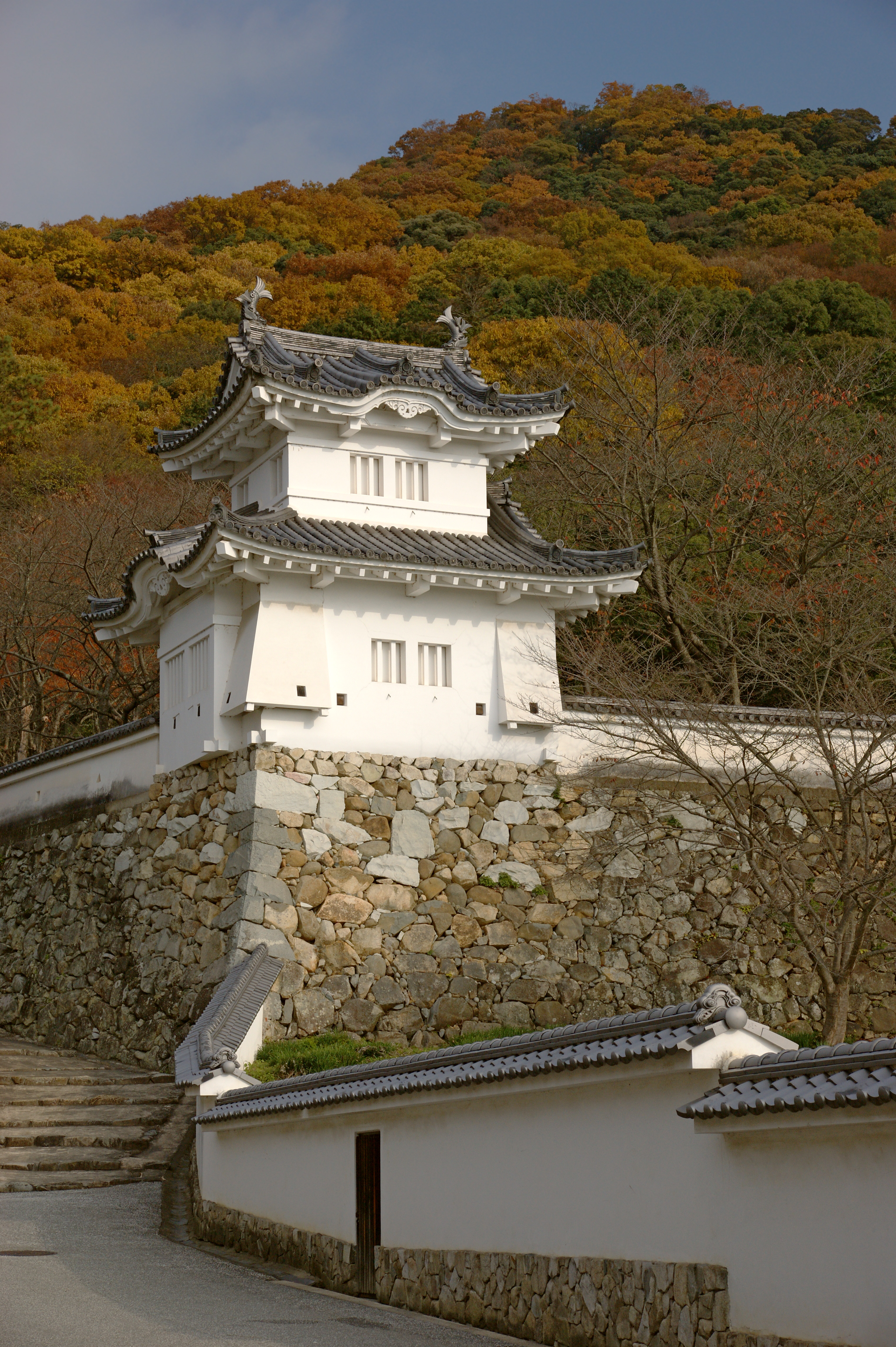
Tatsuno Castle

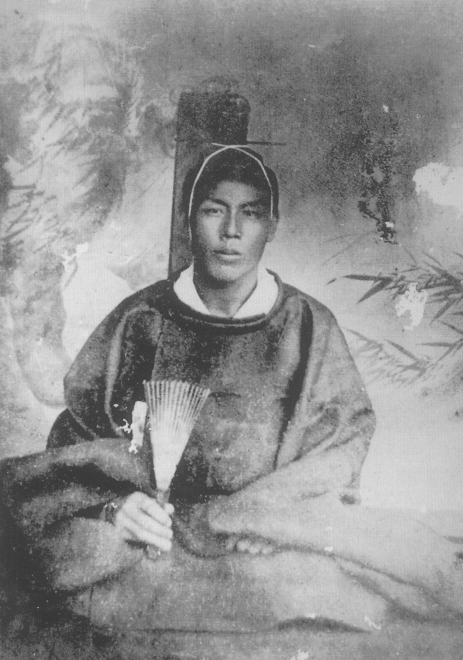
Wakisaka Yasuaya, final daimyō of Tatsuno Domain

Tatsuno Domain (龍野藩, Tatsuno-han) was a feudal domain under the Tokugawa shogunate of Edo period Japan, in Harima Province in what is now the southwestern portion of modern-day Hyōgo Prefecture. It was centered around Tatsuno Castle which was located in what is now the city of Tatsuno, Hyōgo. It was controlled by a cadet branch fudai daimyō Niwa clan throughout its history.

== History ==
At the start of the Edo period, the area around Tatsuno was part of the vast holdings of the Ikeda clan of Himeji Domain. In 1617, Ikeda Mitsumasa was transferred to Tottori Domain and his former estates were divided. A son-in-law of Tokugawa Ieyasu, Honda Tadamasa received a 150,000 koku portion centered on Himeji Castle. Tadamasa's younger son, Honda Masatomo, was transferred from Ōtaki Domain in Kazusa Province and given a 50,000 koku domain at Tatsuno. He reconstructed Tatsuno Castle and its castle town. On the death of his brother Honda Tadatoki of Himeji Domain in 1626, he was transferred to Himeji, and replaced at Tatsuno by his cousin, Ogasawara Nagatsugu, who also received an additional 10,000 koku to take care of Senhime, the widow of Honda Tadatoki and granddaughter of Tokugawa Ieyasu. After brief periods under the Okabe clan and Kyōgoku clan, the domain was assigned to the Wakisaka Yasumasa, formerly of Iida Domain in Shinano Province. The Wakisaka would continue to rule the domain until the Meiji Restoration. Wakizaka Yasumasa received permission from the shogunate to rebuild Tatsuno Castle. The 8th daimyo, Wakasaka Yasutada had a very long tenure, and served as Jisha-bugyō and rōjū in the shogunal administration. A very capable ruler, he reformed the domain's finances and also established a han school. The domain developed soy sauce as a major cash commodity. His successor, Wakisaka Yasunori, served as Kyoto Shoshidai, and also as rōjū. During the Bakumatsu period, the domain was initially a strong supporter of the shogunate. However, under WakisakaYasuaya, the domain forces stopped at the border of Ako district, and refused to proceed further during th Second Chōshū expedition. By the start of the Boshin War, the domain had changed fealty to the new Meiji government and fought against the shogunate in Echigo Province and other locations. In 1871, with the abolition of the han system, the domain became "Tatsuno Prefecture", which was merged with "Shikama Prefecture", which in turn became part of Hyōgo Prefecture.

The Wakisaka clan was ennobled with the kazoku peerage title of shishaku (viscount) in 1884.

== Holdings at the end of the Edo period ==
As with most domains in the han system, Tatsuno Domain consisted of several discontinuous territories calculated to provide the assigned kokudaka, based on periodic cadastral surveys and projected agricultural yields.

- Harima Province
  - 4 villages in Shikisai District
  - 68 villages in Ittō District
  - 62 villages in Issai District
- Mimasaka Province
  - 11 villages in Aida District
  - 5 villages in Mashima District

== List of daimyō ==
#	Name	Tenure	Courtesy title	Court Rank	kokudaka
Honda clan, 1617-1626 (Fudai)
1	Honda Masatomo (本多政朝)	1617 - 1626	Kai-no-kami (甲斐守)	Junior 5th Rank, Lower Grade (従五位下)	50,000 koku
Ogasawara clan, 1626-1632 (Fudai)
1	Ogasawara Nagatsugu (小笠原長次)	1626 - 1632	Shinano-no-kami (信濃守)	Junior 5th Rank, Lower Grade (従五位下)	60,000 koku
tenryō 1632-1633
Okabe clan, 1633-1635 (Fudai)
1	Okabe Nobukatsu (岡部宣勝)	1633 - 1635	Shinano-no-kami (美濃守)	Junior 5th Rank, Lower Grade (従五位下)	53,000 koku
tenryō 1635-1637
Kyōgoku clan, 1637-1658 (Tozama)
1	Kyōgoku Takakazu (京極高和)	1637 - 1658	Gyobu-taiyu (刑部大輔)	Junior 5th Rank, Lower Grade (従五位下)	60,000 koku
tenryō 1658-1672
Wakisaka clan, 1672-1871 (Tozama -> Fudai)
1	Wakisaka Yasumasa (脇坂安政)	1672 - 1684	Nakatsukasa-shoyu (中務少輔)	Junior 5th Rank, Lower Grade (従五位下)	53,000 koku
2	Wakisaka Yasuteru (脇坂安照)	1684 - 1709	Awaji-no-kami (淡路守)	Junior 5th Rank, Lower Grade (従五位下)	53,000 -> 51,000 koku
3	Wakisaka Yasuzumi (脇坂安清)	1709 - 1722	Awaji-no-kami (淡路守)	Junior 5th Rank, Lower Grade (従五位下)	51,000 koku
4	Wakisaka Yasuoki (脇坂安興)	1722 - 1747	Nakatsukasa-shoyu (中務少輔); Awaji-no-kami (淡路守)	Junior 5th Rank, Lower Grade (従五位下)	51,000 koku
5	WakisakaYasuhiro (脇坂安弘)	1747 - 1757	Nakatsukasa-shoyu (中務少輔)	Junior 5th Rank, Lower Grade (従五位下)	51,000 koku
6	Wakisaka Yasuzane (脇坂安実)	1757 - 1759	Ise-no-kami (伊勢守)	Junior 5th Rank, Lower Grade (従五位下)	51,000 koku
7	Wakisaka Yasuchika (脇坂安親)	1759 - 1784	Awaji-no-kami (淡路守); Zusho-no-kami (図書頭)	Junior 5th Rank, Lower Grade (従五位下)	51,000 koku
8	Wakisaka Yasutada (脇坂安董)	1784 - 1841	Nakatsukasa-daiyu (中務大輔); Jijū (侍従)	Junior 4th Rank, Lower Grade (従四位下)	51,000 koku
9	Wakisaka Yasuori (脇坂安宅)	1841 - 1862	Nakatsukasa-daiyu (中務大輔); Jijū (侍従)	Junior 4th Rank, Lower Grade (従四位下)	51,000 koku
10	Wasizaka Yasuaya (脇坂安斐)	1862 - 1871	Awaji-no-kami (淡路守)	Junior 5th Rank, Lower Grade (従五位下)	51,000 koku

== See also ==
- List of Han
- Abolition of the han system
