= Sakai Tadaaki =

Japanese daimyō (1813–1873)

- 酒井 忠義
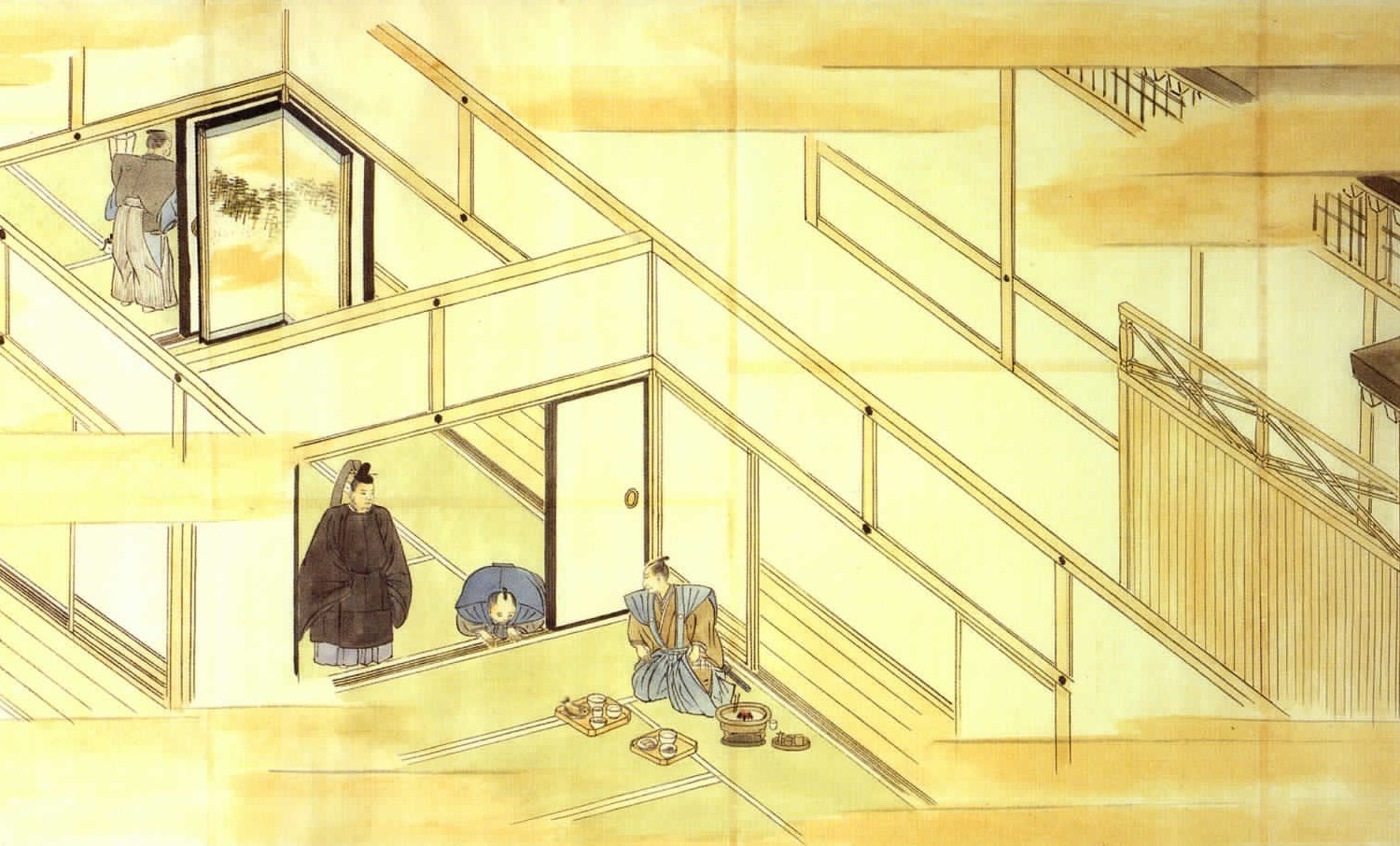

12th Daimyō of Obama Domain
- In office 1834–1862
- Preceded by: Sakai Tadayori
- Succeeded by: Sakai Tadauji

14th Daimyō of Obama Domain
- In office 1868–1871
- Preceded by: Sakai Tadauji

Personal details
- Born: August 4, 1813
- Died: December 5, 1873 (aged 60)
- Resting place: Obama, Wakasa, Japan
- Spouse: Daughter of Matsudaira Terunobu
- Parent: Sakai Tadayuki (father)
- Nickname: Sakai Tadatoshi (酒井 忠禄)

Sakai Tadaaki (酒井 忠義; August 4, 1813 – December 5, 1873), also known as Sakai Tadayoshi, was a daimyō of the Edo period and prominent shogunal official. He was also known by his courtesy titles Shūri-daibu (1834; and again in 1850); Wakasa-no-kami (1841); and Ukyō-daibu (1862). He was Obama's last daimyō, holding this position until feudal domains were abolished in 1871.

== Biography ==
Tadaaki was fifth son of Sakai Tadayuki, and became daimyō in 1834 on the retirement of Sakai Tadayori without an heir. His wife was a daughter of Matsudaira Terunobu of Takasaki Domain. In 1840, he was given the courtesy title of Wakasa-no-kami and Lower 4th, Junior grade court rank. In 1842, was appointed a sōshaban and jisha-bugyō simultaneously. The following year was appointed the 48th Kyoto Shoshidai, and added the title of Jijū to his honorifics. Owing to his opposition of the candidacy of Tokugawa Yoshitomi (the later shōgun Iemochi) for the position of shōgun, he angered the political faction within the government which supported Hitotsubashi Yoshinobu. This was one of the causes of Ii Naosuke's Ansei Purge, and Tadaaki was forced to resign as Kyoto Shoshidai in 1850.

Tadaaki was reappointed as the 52nd Kyoto Shoshidai from August 5, 1858, through July 26, 1862. Many of the events which occurred in Kyoto during the tumultuous Bakumatsu period occurred while he was at Kyoto. During this period, he served as chief intermediary between the shogunate in Edo and Emperor Kōmei during a period of extensive negotiations, delays, and political maneuvering which accompanied plans for the eventual marriage of Komei's sister, Princess Kazunomiya, and Tokugawa Iemochi in March 1862.

He resigned again in 1862, this time also from the position of daimyō, adopting Sakai Tadauji, the son of a hatamoto as his heir, and went into retirement. At this time, he also changed his name to Tadatoshi (忠禄). However, with the start of the Boshin War, following the defeat of the Tokugawa shogunate forces at the Battle of Toba-Fushimi, he resumed the post of daimyō and defected to the Imperial side. In 1869, he was appointed imperial governor of Wakasa under the new Meiji government. He died in 1873.

== Notes ==
Preceded by Sakai Tadayori	_12th Daimyō of Obama; 1834–1862	Succeeded by Sakai Tadauji
Preceded by Sakai Tadauji	_14th Daimyō of Obama; 1868–1871	Succeeded by none
Preceded by Makino Tadamasa	_48th Kyoto Shoshidai; 1843–1850	Succeeded by Naitō Nobuchika
Preceded by Honda Tadamoto	_52nd Kyoto Shoshidai; 1858–1862	Succeeded by Matsudaira Munehide
