= 嶺南 =

嶺南, meaning "south of the mountain pass", may refer to:

- Lingnan, region of China south of the Nan Mountains, roughly corresponding to Jiangxi, Hunan, Guangdong, Guangxi, and Hainan Provinces
- Yeongnam, region of Korea roughly corresponding to the historical Gyeongsang Province
- Wakasa Province of Japan, alternatively called Reinan, roughly corresponding to Fukui Prefecture
