= Wakisaka =

Wakisaka (written: 脇阪 or 脇坂) is a Japanese surname. Notable people with the surname include:

- Juichi Wakisaka (脇阪 寿一; born 1972), Japanese former racing driver
- Mayu Wakisaka (脇阪 真由; born 1980), Japanese singer-songwriter based in the United States
- Reina Wakisaka (脇阪 麗奈; born 1999), Japanese professional footballer
- Shigekazu Wakisaka (脇阪 薫一; born 1975), Japanese racing driver
- Wakisaka Yasuharu (脇坂 安治; 1554–1626), Japanese samurai and daimyō
- Wakisaka Yasuori (脇坂 安宅; 1809–1874), Japanese daimyō
