= Sakai clan =

Japanese samurai clan

Sakai clan 酒井 / 坂井
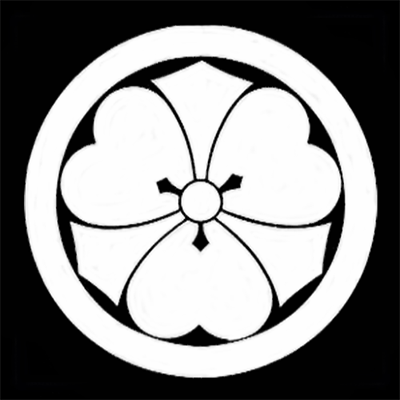
- Emblem (mon) of the Sakai clan
- Home province: Mikawa
- Parent house: Nitta clan
- Titles: Various
- Founder: Sakai Chikauji
- Founding year: 14th century
- Dissolution: still extant

The Sakai clan (Japanese: 酒井氏／坂井氏, Hepburn: Sakai-shi; Japanese pronunciation: [saꜜ.kai(.ɕi)]) was a Japanese samurai clan that claimed descent from the Nitta branch of the Minamoto clan, who were in turn descendants of Emperor Seiwa. Serata (Nitta) Arichika, a samurai of the 14th century, was the common ancestor of both the Sakai clan and the Matsudaira clan, which the Sakai later served. In the Sengoku period, under Tokugawa Ieyasu (who was the head of what was formerly the main Matsudaira family line), the Sakai became chief retainers. In the Edo period, because of their longstanding service to the Tokugawa clan, the Sakai were classified as a fudai family, in contrast with the tozama ("outsider clans").

== Clan branches and histories ==
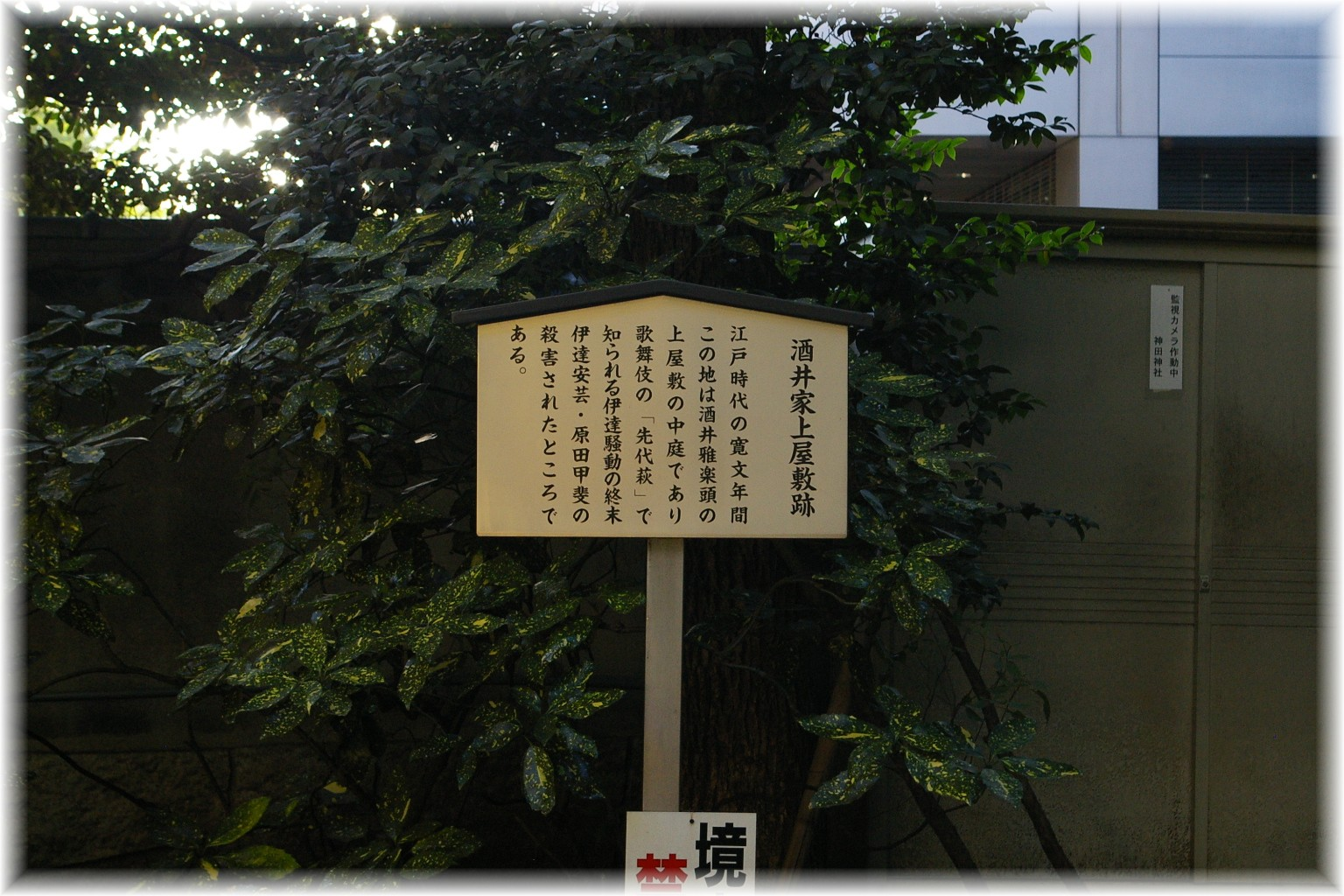
Site of the Sakai clan's residence in Edo

The fudai Sakai clan originated in 14th century Mikawa Province. They claim descent from Minamoto no Arichika. Arichika had two sons; one of them, Yasuchika, took the name of Matsudaira, while the other son, Chikauji, took the name of Sakai. Chikauji is the ancestor of the Sakai clan. Sakai Hirochika, Chikauji's son, had two sons as well, and the descendants of these two sons gave rise to the two principal branches of the clan. The senior branch was founded by Sakai Tadatsugu (1527–1596). Tadatsugu, a vassal of Tokugawa Ieyasu, was charged with the defense of Yoshida Castle in Mikawa Province. In 1578, Sakai Ietsugu (1564–1619) succeeded to his father's role as defender of Yoshida Castle. The Ie- in the beginning of Ietsugu's name was a special honor bestowed by Tokugawa Ieyasu, who intended to emphasize bonds of loyalty with those who were allowed to share in any part of his name. When Ieyasu's holdings were transferred to the Kantō region in 1590, Ietsugu was installed at Usui Domain (30,000 koku) in Kōzuke Province, but, in 1604, he was moved to Takasaki Domain (50,000 koku). In 1616, he was again moved to Takada Domain (100,000 koku), this time in Echigo Province. In 1619, he was moved to Matsushiro Domain in Shinano Province; and then, from 1622 to 1868, he was installed at Tsuruoka Domain (120,000 koku) in Dewa Province. The Sakai of Tsuruoka (which later grew to 170,000 koku) in Dewa Province were prominent in the late Edo period as a military power. Charged with the safety of Edo, they were patrons of the Shinsengumi police force, and were very effective in their duties. Following the surrender of Edo, the Sakai withdrew and returned north to their domain, where they were active in the northern theater of the Boshin War, as well as becoming signatories to the pact that created the Ōuetsu Reppan Dōmei in 1868. The head of this clan line was ennobled as a "Count" in the Meiji period.

A cadet branch was created in 1647. These Sakai were installed from 1647 through 1868 at Matsumine Domain (20,000 koku) in Dewa Province; the castle at Matsumine was constructed in 1779. The head of this clan line was ennobled as a "Viscount" in the Meiji period.

Another cadet branch was founded by Sakai Masachika (+1576). Vassal of the Tokugawa – Tokugawa Nobutada, Tokugawa Kiyoyasu and Tokugawa Hirotada. In 1561, he was installed at Nishio Castle in Mikawa Province, and the security of the castle was confided in him. In 1590, Sakai Shigetada, the son of Masachika, received the Kawagoe Domain (15,000 koku) in Musashi Province; then in 1601, he was installed at Umayabashi Domain (35,000 koku) in Kōzuke Province.

In 1749, the descendants of Sakai Tadakiyo (1626–1681) were transferred to Himeji Domain (150,000 koku) in Harima Province; and they remained daimyō at Himeji until the Meiji period. This cadet branch of the Sakai had been created in 1590. The head of this clan line was first ennobled as a "Count" and in the Meiji period.

Yet another cadet branch of the Sakai had been created in 1668, These Sakai were installed from 1668 through 1868 at Katsuyama Domain (12,000 koku) in Awa Province. The head of this clan line was ennobled as a "Viscount" in the Meiji period.

A further cadet branch of the Sakai had been created in 1681, These Sakai were installed in 1681 through 1868 at Isezaki Domain (20,000 koku) in Kōzuke Province. The head of this clan line was ennobled as a "Viscount" in the Meiji period.

Sakai Tadatoshi (1562–1627) received the fief of Tanaka Domain (10,000 koku) in Suruga Province in 1601; then his holding was transferred in 1609 to Kawagoe Domain (30,000 koku) in Musashi province.

Sakai Tadakatsu (1587–1662) was installed in 1634 through 1868 at Obama Domain (103,500 koku) in Wakasa Province . This cadet branch of the Sakai had been created in 1590. The head of this clan line was ennobled as a "Count" in the Meiji period.

Finally, another cadet branch of the Sakai had been created in 1682. These Sakai were installed in 1682 through 1868 at Tsuruga Domain (10,000 koku) in Echizen Province. The head of this clan line was ennobled as a "Viscount" in the Meiji period.

== Family heads ==
=== Shōnai ===
- Sakai Tadatsugu (1527–1596)
- Sakai Tadakatsu (1594–1647)
- Sakai Tadamasa
- Sakai Tadayoshi
- Sakai Tadazane
- Sakai Tadayori
- Sakai Tadaatsu
- Sakai Tadaari
- Sakai Tadakata
- Sakai Tadaaki
- Sakai Tadatomo
- Sakai Tadazumi
- Sakai Tadamichi

==== Dewa-Matsuyama (branch of the Shonai Domain) ====
- Sakai Tadatsune
- Sakai Tadayasu
- Sakai Tadayoshi
- Sakai Tadataka
- Sakai Tadanori
- Sakai Tadamichi
- Sakai Tadayoshi
- Sakai Tadamasa

=== Tsuruga ===
- Sakai Tadashige
- Sakai Tadagiku
- Sakai Tadatake
- Sakai Tadaka
- Sakai Tadanobu
- Sakai Tadae
- Sakai Tadamasu
- Sakai Tadatsune

- Sakai Tadakatsu (1587–1662)
- Sakai Tadanao (1630–1682)
- Sakai Tadataka (1651–1686)
- Sakai Tadasono (1671–1706)
- Sakai Tadashige (1691–1735)
- Sakai Tadaakira (1720–1740)
- Sakai Tadamochi (1725–1775)
- Sakai Tadayoshi (1813–1873)
- Sakai Tadatsura (1752–1806)
- Sakai Tadayuki (1770–1828)
- Sakai Tadayori (1791–1853)
- Sakai Tadaaki (1813–1873; formerly Tadayoshi)
- Sakai Tadauji (1835–1876)
- Sakai Tadatoshi (1813–1873)

=== Himeji ===
==== Maebashi domain ====
The successive leaders at Maebashi were:

- Sakai Tadayoshi (1549–1617)
- Sakai Tadayo (1572–1636)
- Sakai Tadayuki (1599–1636)
- Sakai Tadakiyo (1626–1681)
- Sakai Tadataka (Maebashi) (1648–1720)
- Sakai Tadami (1667–1708)
- Sakai Chikayoshi (1694–1733)
- Sakai Chikamoto (1705–1731)

==== Himeji domain ====
The successive leaders at Himeji were:

- Sakai Tadazumi (Himeji) (1710–1772)
- Sakai Tadazane (1756–1790)
- Sakai Tadahiro (1777–1837)
- Sakai Tadamitsu (1779–1848)
- Sakai Tadanori (1809–1844)
- Sakai Tadatomi (1829–1853)
- Sakai Tadateru (1836–1860)
- Sakai Tadashige (1827–1895)
- Sakai Tadatoshi (1839–1907)
- Sakai Tadakuni (1854–1879)

== Notable members ==
- Saburō Sakai (1916–2000)
- Sakai Jitarō
- Sakai Chikauji
- Sakai Hirochika
- Sakai Tadatsugu (1527–1596)
- Sakai Ietsugu (1564–1619)
- Sakai Masachika
- Sakai Shigetada
- Sakai Tadakiyo (1626–1681)
- Sakai Tadatoshi (1562–1627)
- Sakai Tadakatsu (1587–1662)
- Sakai Tadakatsu (Shōnai) (1594–1647)
- Sakai Tadamasa (Shōnai)
- Sakai Tadamochi (1725–1775), 21st Kyoto shoshidai
- Sakai Tadayuki (1770–1828), 37th Kyoto shoshidai
- Sakai Tadazumi, Himeji Castle
- Sakai Tadashige, Rōjū (1863–1864), Tairō (1865–1866).
- Sakai Tadasuke (also known as Sakai Tadamasu), Wakadoshiyori (1853–1862, 1863, 1864–1866)
- Sakai Tadaaki (1813–1873), also known as Sakai Tadayoshi 49th Kyoto shoshidai
- Sakai Tadakatsu (Meiji era), Count, House of Peers (1925)
- Sakai Tadamasa (Meiji era), Count, House of Peers (1925)
- Sakai Tadasuke, Viscount, House of Peers (1925)
