= Sakai Tadamochi =

- 酒井忠用
- Born: January 3, 1723
- Died: October 21, 1775 (aged 52)
- Burial place: Obama, Wakasa, Japan
- Father: Sakai Tadaoto

Daimyō of Obama Domain
- In office 1740–1757
- Preceded by: Sakai Tadaakira
- Succeeded by: Sakai Tadayoshi

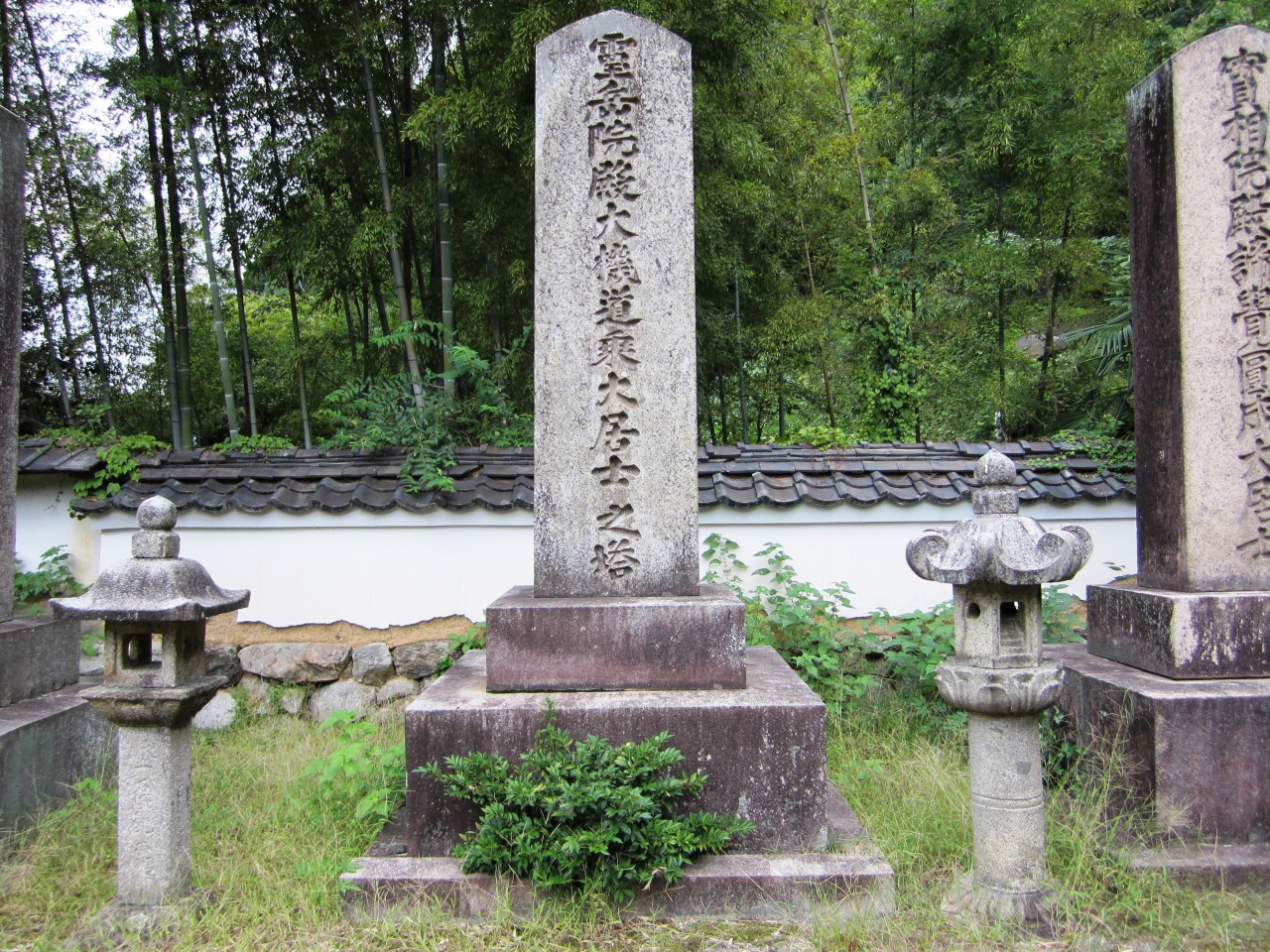
Grave of Sakai Tadamochi in Obama

Sakai Tadamochi (酒井忠用; January 3, 1723-October 21, 1775) was the 7th daimyō of Obama Domain.

== Biography ==
Tadamochi was the fifth son of Sakai Tadaoto by a concubine, and became daimyō in 1740 on the death of his elder brother Sakai Tadaakira. His courtesy title was Shuri-daiyu. His wife was a daughter of Matsudaira Sadanori of Takada Domain.

In 1741 Tadamochi was appointed a sōshaban and jisha-bugyō simultaneously, and later the same year, he became Osaka-jō dai. In 1747 his courtesy title was changed to Sanuki-no-kami and his court rank was increased from Lower 5th, Junior grade to Lower 4th, Junior grade. From 1752 to 1756 he was appointed the 21st Kyoto Shoshidai, and he added the title of Jijū to his honorifics.

In 1754, the earliest recorded post-mortem examination in Japan was supervised by Tadamochi's personal physician. This investigation by Kosugi Genteki (1730–1791) was considered highly controversial by his contemporary peers. The autopsy involved an examination of the corpse of an executed criminal somewhere within the precincts of Jidoin Temple north of Nijō Castle; and the results were eventually published in Zoshi (Description of the Organs) in 1759.

He retired from public office in 1757, and his title was changed to Sakyō-daifu. He died in 1775 without male heir

Tadamochi is buried with others of his clan at Kuin-ji in Obama in what is today Fukui Prefecture.

| Preceded by Sakai Tadaakira | _7th Daimyō of Obama; 1740–1757 | Succeeded by Sakai Tadayoshi |
| Preceded by Abe Masayoshi | _ 21st Kyoto Shoshidai; 1752-1756 | Succeeded by Ōkubo Tadazane |
