= Sakai Tadayuki =

- 酒井忠進
- Born: April 4, 1770
- Died: March 12, 1828 (aged 57)
- Burial place: Obama, Wakasa, Japan
- Father: Sakai Tadaka

Daimyō of Obama Domain
- In office 1806–1828
- Preceded by: Sakai Tadatsura
- Succeeded by: Sakai Tadayoshi

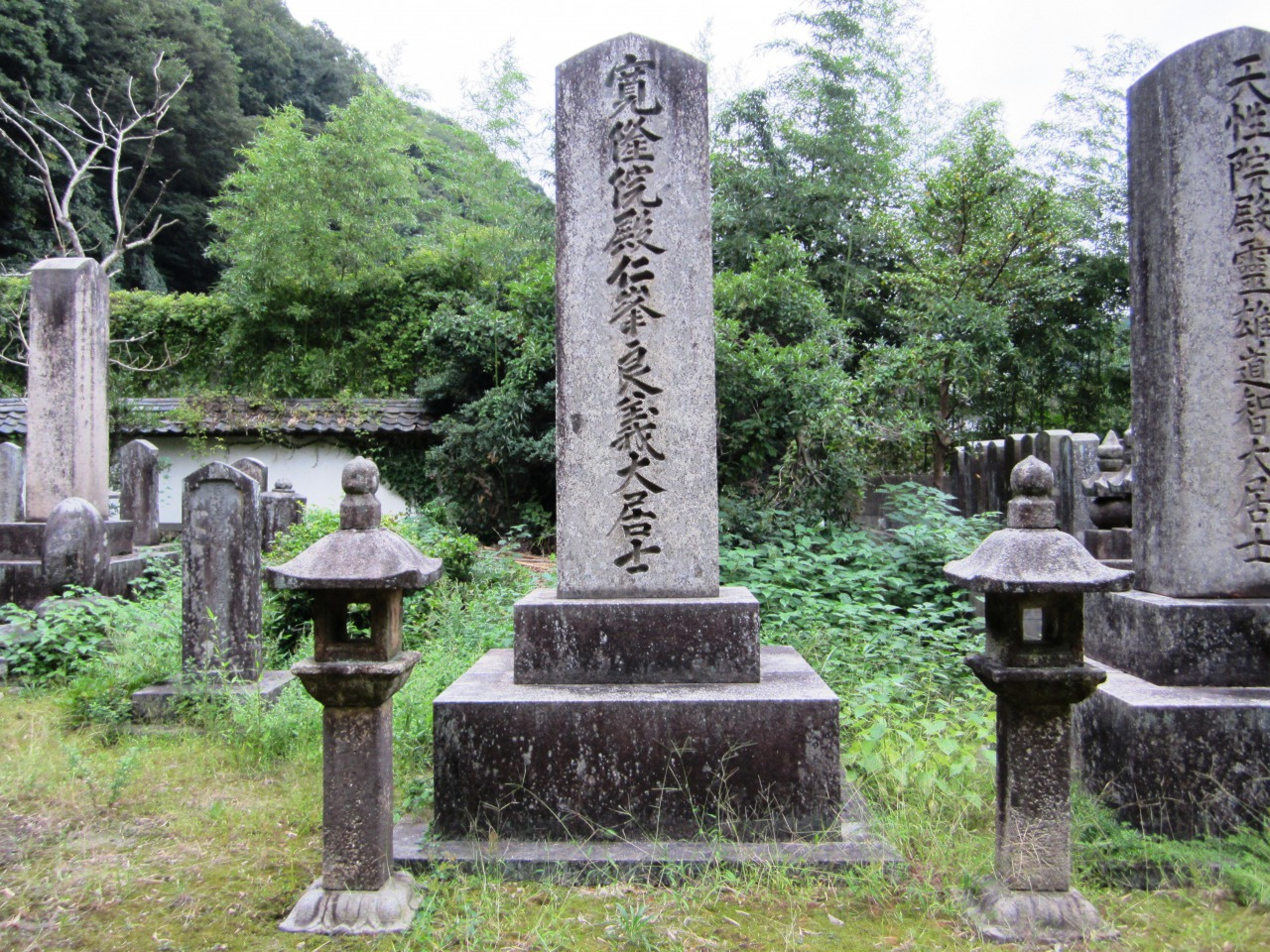
Sakai Tadayuki's Grave in Obama

Sakai Tadayuki (酒井忠進; April 4, 1770-March 12, 1828) was the 10th daimyō of Obama Domain in mid- to late Edo period Japan.

== Biography ==
Tadayuki was the seventh son of Sakai Tadaka of Tsuruga Domain and was posthumously adopted as heir to Obama on the death of Sakai Tadatsura in 1806. His wife was a daughter of Okudaira Masashika of Nakatsu Domain. In 1808, he becamejisha-bugyō and from 1808 to 1815 served as the 37th Kyoto Shoshidai In 1815, he was ordered to oversee the reconstruction of the 5-story pagoda at Nikkō Tōshō-gū, which had been destroyed by a fire. Later that year, he was promoted to rōjū, holding that post until his death in 1828.

Preceded by Sakai Tadatsura	10th Daimyō of Obama; 1806–1828	Succeeded by Sakai Tadayori
Preceded by Abe Masayoshi	36th Kyoto Shoshidai; 1808–1815	Succeeded by Ōkubo Tadazane
