= Echizen Province =

Former province of Japan

Echizen Province 越前国
- pre-Meiji period Japan
- 701 AD–1871
- Map of Japanese provinces (1868) with Echizen Province highlighted
- Capital: Echizen
- Area
  - Coordinates: 36°24′N 136°30′E
- History
  - Ritsuryō system implemented: 701 AD
  - Disestablished: 1871
- Today part of: Fukui Prefecture

Echizen Province (越前国, Echizen no Kuni; Japanese pronunciation: [è̞.c̟͡ɕí.(d͡)zè̞ɴ̀, -(d͡)zè̞ǹ nò̞ kɯ̈̀.ɲ̟ì]) was a province of Japan in the area that is today the northern portion of Fukui Prefecture in the Hokuriku region of Japan. Echizen bordered on Kaga, Wakasa, Hida, and Ōmi Provinces. It was part of Hokurikudō Circuit. Its abbreviated form name was (Esshū; 越州).

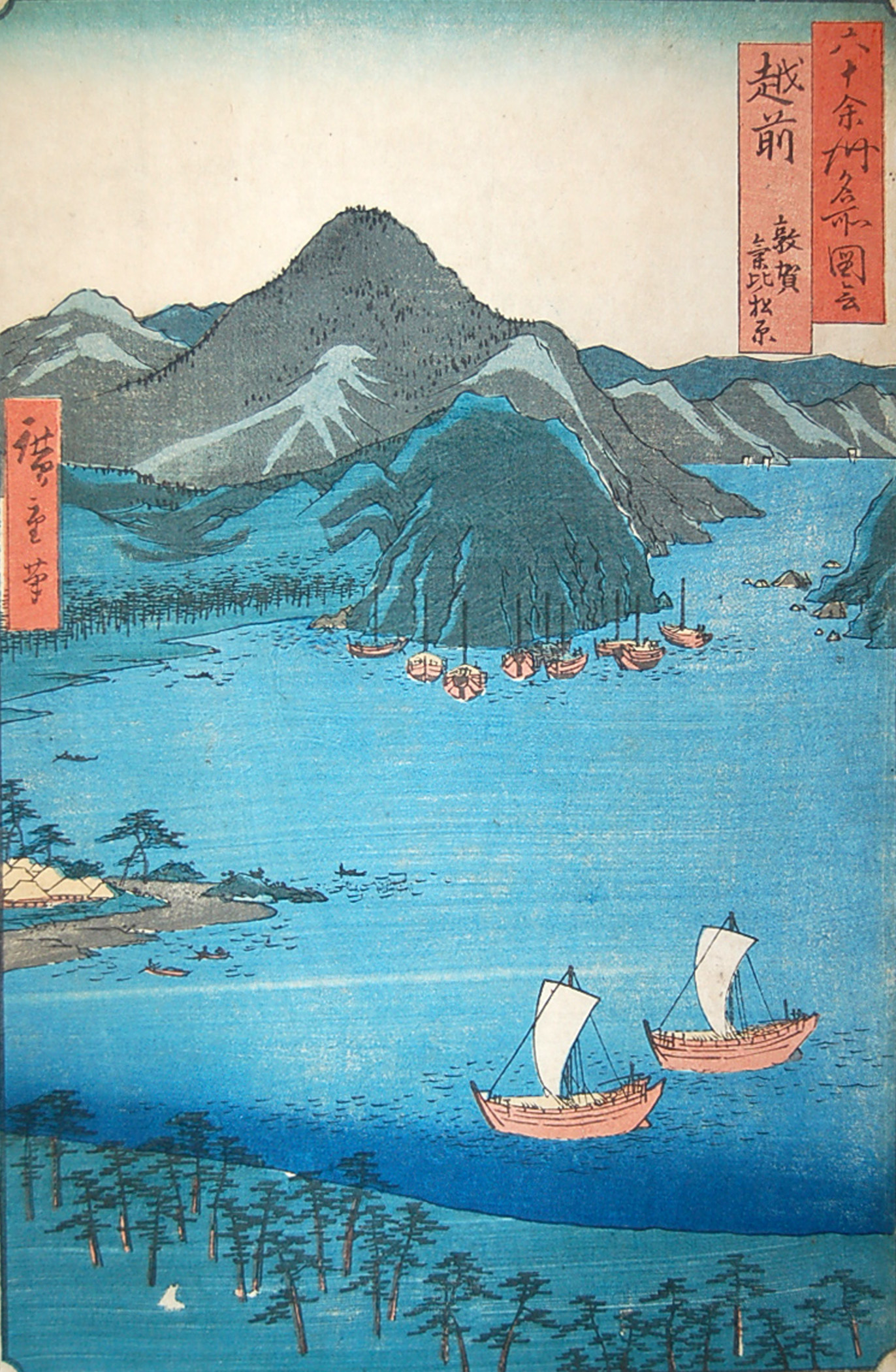
Hiroshige ukiyo-e "Echizen" in "The Famous Scenes of the Sixty States" (六十余州名所図会), depicting Tsuruga Bay

== History ==
=== Ancient and classical Echizen ===
Koshi Province (越国, Koshi-no-Kuni) was an ancient province of Japan and is listed as one of the original provinces in the Nihon Shoki. The region as a whole was sometimes referred to as Esshū (越州). In 507, during a succession crisis, the king of Koshi was chosen to become the 26th emperor of Japan, Emperor Keitai.

In 701 AD, per the reforms of the Taihō Code, Koshi was divided into three separate provinces: Echizen, Etchū, and Echigo. The original Echizen included all of what is now Ishikawa Prefecture. In 718 A.D., four districts of northern Echizen (Hakui District, Noto District (also called Kashima District), Fugeshi District and Suzu District), were separated to form Noto Province. During the Nara period, the poet Nakatomi no Yakamori was exiled to Echizen, where he wrote some of his 40 poems collected in the Man'yōshū, including his love letters to Sanuno Otogami no Otome. Another famous Man'yōshū poet, Ōtomo no Yakamochi, wrote many pieces about Echizen. .

In 823 AD, the two eastern districts of Echizen (Kaga and Enuma) were separated to form Kaga Province. Kaga was thus the last province to be created under the ritsuryō system, and Echizen received its current borders at that time. During the Heian period, the provincial governor of Echizen, Fujiwara no Tametoki, was the father of the celebrated author Murasaki Shikibu. Lady Murasaki left her hometown of Heian-kyō only once in her life, to go to Echizen with her father. She stayed for just over one year, and then returned home to marry Fujiwara no Nobutaka. Her experiences in Echizen are said to have had a major influence on her greatest work, The Tale of Genji, and many place names from Echizen appear in her stories and poems.

Echizen was a strategically important province due to its proximity to Kyoto and Nara and due to its location on the Sea of Japan with contacts to the Asian continent. The province was traditionally famous for its production of washi paper. A text dated AD 774 mentions the washi made in this area. Echizen is also well known for its ceramics. It is one of the so-called six old kiln sites of Japan (the others being Shigaraki, Bizen, Seto, Tanba, and Tokoname).

The exact location of the provincial capital and Provincial temple of Echizen are unknown, but are believed to have been in what is now the city of Echizen.

=== Medieval and pre-modern Echizen ===
For most of the war between the Northern and Southern Courts, Echizen was under the control of the Ashikaga shogunate and Northern Courts. The province was often used as a launching point for the shogunate's attack against the capital, and Echizen became the stage for a number of decisive battles of the war.

During most of the Muromachi period, the Shiba clan ruled as shugo of Echizen. The Shiba were displaced by the Asakura clan towards the start of the Sengoku period, who made Ichijōdani their headquarters. Under Asakura Yoshikage, Echizen enjoyed a peace and stability far greater than the rest of Japan during this chaotic period, partly due to his negotiations with the Ikkō-ikki. As a result, Echizen became a refuge for people fleeing the violence to the south.

When Oda Nobunaga invaded Echizen, he defeated the Asakura clan, burned Ichijōdani Castle to the ground and re-established the provincial capital at Echizen-Fūchu, divided among his generals Fuwa Mitsuharu, Sassa Narimasa, and Maeda Toshiie. The province remained in their hands only for a short time, after which the three were granted larger fiefs of their own elsewhere. After the death of Nobunaga, control of Echizen passed on to Shibata Katsuie, who built his castle at Kitanosho Castle in what is now the city of Fukui. Shibata himself only held Echizen Province for a few years, after which he was defeated by Toyotomi Hideyoshi.

After the Battle of Sekigahara and the establishment of the Tokugawa shogunate, the entire province was awarded by the first shogun Tokugawa Ieyasu to his second son, Yūki Hideyasu, who became the daimyō of Echizen Domain, from his base at Fukui Castle. During the early years of the Tokugawa shogunate, many nobles and aristocrats moved to Fukui city in hopes to win the favor of Hideyasu, who was widely expected to become the new shōgun. There was great disappointment and resentment when the shogunate passed on to Ieyasu's third son, Tokugawa Hidetada. However, Echizen remained a strategically important military and political base; the Tokugawa shōguns needed loyal daimyō in the provinces surrounding the imperial capital, and Echizen served as a powerful buffer between Kyōto and the Maeda clan of Kaga, who were not among the fudai (hereditary Tokugawa allies).

Much of the province remained in the control of the Matsudaira clan until the Meiji Restoration; however, due to internal conflicts, the kokudaka of Fukui Domain was much reduced from its initial size, and several new domains were created. A large portion of the area of the province also became tenryo territory (shogunal demesnes) administered directly by the shogunate.

=== Meiji period and beyond ===
During the Bakumatsu period, Matsudaira Shungaku, the 17th daimyō of Fukui Domain plays a major role in national politics, and acted as an intermediary to negotiate the surrender of pro-Tokugawa forces to the Meiji government at the end of the Boshin War. However, with the Meiji Restoration, the centre of political power shifted completely from Kyoto to Tokyo, and Echizen increasingly became a backwater. On August 29, 1871, Fukui Prefecture and Tsuruga Prefecture were established. However, on August 21, 1875 Fukui Prefecture was abolished, becoming part of Ishikawa Prefecture, whereas Tsuruga Prefecture became part of Shiga Prefecture. Fukui Prefecture was re-established on February 7, 1881.

Although Echizen no longer existed after 1871 and maps of Japan were reformed after that date At the same time, Echizen continued to exist legally for certain purposes. For example, Echizen is explicitly recognized in treaties in 1894 (a) between Japan and the United States and (b) between Japan and the United Kingdom.

In a border adjustment between Fukui prefecture and Gifu Prefecture on October 15, 1958, the village of Itoshiro in Ōno District was transferred to Gifu.

== Historical districts ==
Echizen Province consisted of four districts:

- Fukui Prefecture
  - Asuwa District (足羽郡) - dissolved
  - Imadate District (今立郡)
  - Nanjō District (南条郡)
  - Nyū District (丹生郡)
  - Ōno District (大野郡) - dissolved
  - Sakai District (坂井郡) - dissolved
  - Tsuruga District (敦賀郡) - dissolved
  - Yoshida District (吉田郡)

== Bakumatsu period domains ==
#	Name	type	daimyō	kokudaka
	Fukui Domain	shinpan	Matsudaira clan	320,000 koku
	Maruoka Domain	fudai	Arima clan	50,000 koku
	Sabae Domain	fudai	Manabe clan	40,000 koku
	Ōno Domain	fudai	Doi clan	50,000 koku
	Echizen-Katsuyama Domain	fudai	Ogasawara clan	22,000 koku
	Tsuruga Domain	fudai	Sakai clan	11,000 koku
