= Tsuruga Domain =

Historical estate in Edo-period Japan

Mariyama Domain (1870) 鞠山藩 Tsuruga Domain (1602–1870) 敦賀藩
- Domain of Japan
- 1682–1870
- Capital: Mariyama jin'ya
- Area
  - Coordinates: 35°40′42.6″N 136°4′39.2″E
- Government
  - Type: Daimyō
- Historical era: Edo period
  - Established: 1682
  - Sakai: 1682
  - Disestablished: 1870
| Preceded by | Succeeded by |
| Echizen Province | Obama Domain |
- Today part of: part of Fukui Prefecture

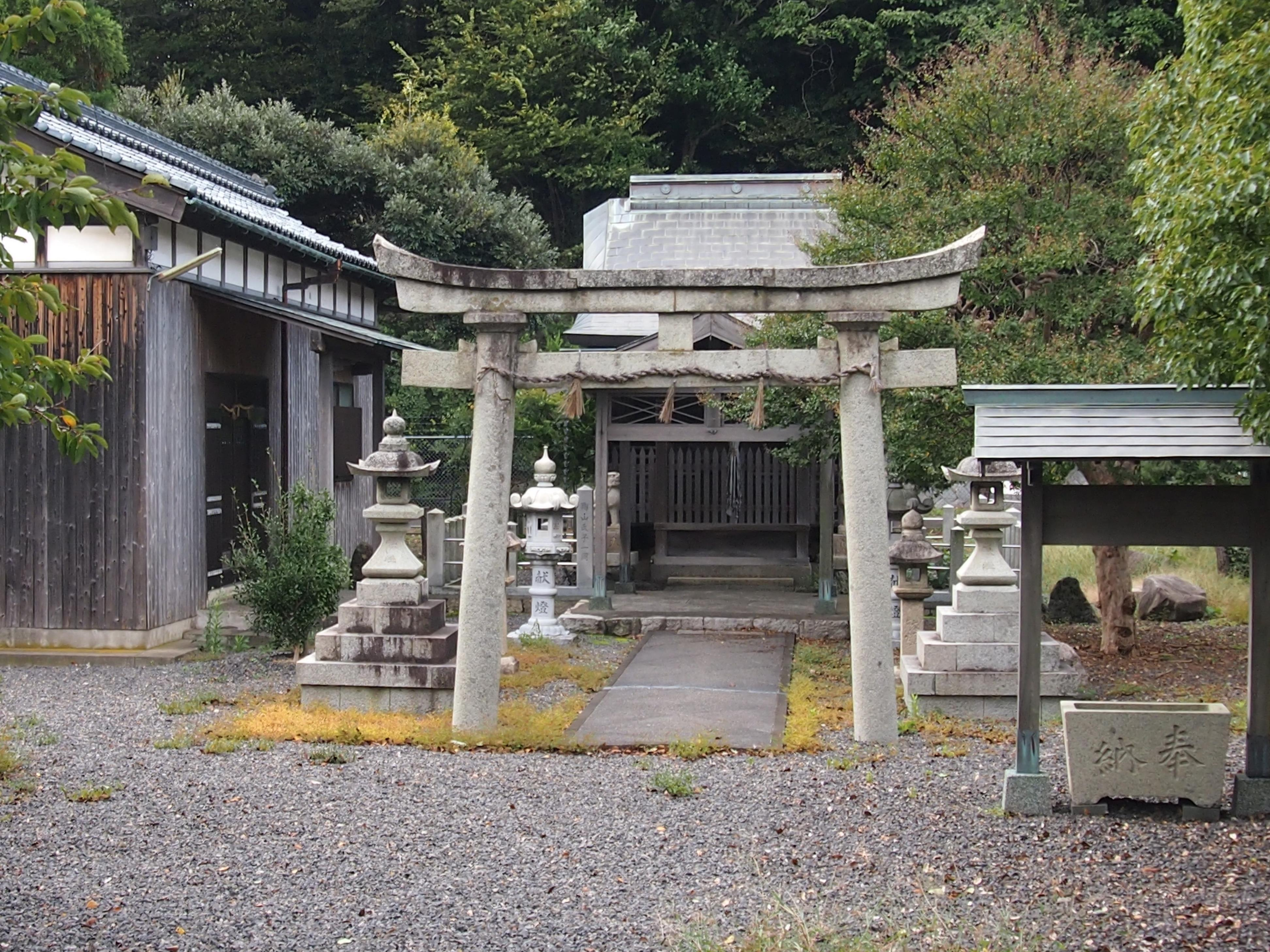
Mariyama Shrine, located on the site of Tsuruga jin'ya

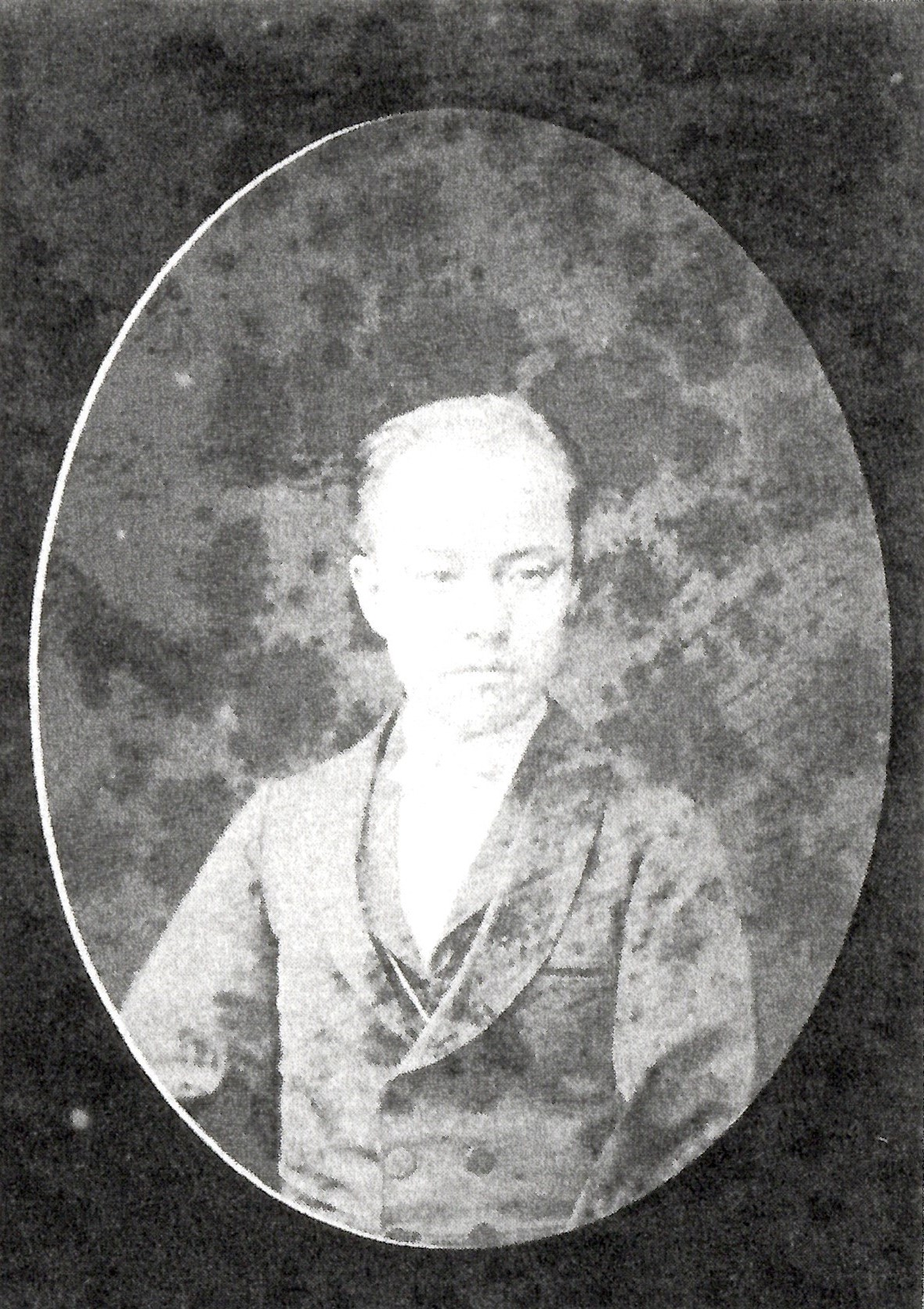
Sakai Tadatsune, final daimyō of Tsuruga Domain

Tsuruga Domain (敦賀藩, Tsuruga-han) was a fudai feudal domain of Edo period Japan. It is located in Echizen Province, in the Hokuriku region of Honshū. The domain was centered at Tsuruga jin'ya, located in the center of what is now the city of Tsuruga in Fukui Prefecture. It was also referred to as Mariyama Domain (鞠山藩, Mariyama-han).

== History ==
The Tsuruga District was an important seaport on the Sea of Japan from ancient times. In the Sengoku period, it came under the control of Shibata Katsuie. Under Toyotomi Hideyoshi, it was assigned as a 50,0000 koku fief to Hachiya Yoritaka, and after he died without heir in 1589, it was assigned to Ōtani Yoshitsugu. However, after the 1600 Battle of Sekigahara, the victorious Tokugawa Ieyasu assigned all of Echizen Province as a 680,000 koku fief to his second son Yūki Hideyasu. In 1615, under the Tokugawa shogunate's "one country, one castle" policy Tsuruga Castle was destroyed. Further, Yuki Hideyasu's son, Matsudaira Tadanao was dismissed by the shogunate for misgovernment, and Fukui Domain was greatly reduced in size. The Tsuruga area became divided mostly between territory controlled by the Sakai clan of neighbouring Obama Domain and tenryō territory controlled directly by the shogunate.

In 1682, the 2nd daimyō of Obama Domain, Sakai Tadanao, left a will stating that 10,000 koku portion of Obama Domain's holdings in Tsuruga be separated into a separate domain for his second son, Sakai Tadashige. This marked the start of Tsuruga Domain. Initially, the domain existed completely as a subsidiary domain of Obama Domain and continued to be administered as an integral part of that domain. Although a jin'ya was constructed in the Mariyama area in 1687, only a few officials resided there - the daimyō of Tsuruoka worked as officials within the shōgun government, and preferred to stay at the domain's residence in Edo. The fourth daimyō of Tsuruga, Sakai Tadaka started to take steps to assert the domain's independence from the parent house from 1759; however, one hundred years later, the domain still remained economically dependent on Obama and the seventh daimyō, Sakai Tadamasu proposed unsuccessfully that it be reabsorbed back into Obama. In 1861, the domain kokudaka was increased by 1060 koku with the promotion of Sakai Tadamasa to wakadoshiyori and the status of a "castle-holding daimyō, but with these promotions came the onus to perform the sankin kōtai, so the domain was actually worse off financially than before. During the Boshin War, the domain followed the lead of the parent house and defected to the imperial side. The final daimyō of Tsuruga, Sakai Tadatsune served as imperial governor under the Meiji government until the abolition of the han system in 1871.

== Bakumatsu period holdings ==
Like with most fudai domains in the han system, Tsuruga Domain consisted of discontinuous territories calculated to provide the assigned kokudaka, based on periodic cadastral surveys and projected agricultural yields,

- Echizen Province
  - 23 villages in Tsuruga District
- Ōmi Province
  - 13 villages in Takashima District

== List of daimyō ==
| # | Name | Tenure | Courtesy title | Court Rank | kokudaka |
|---|---|---|---|---|---|
Sakai clan (fudai) 1682–1871
| 1 | Sakai Tadashige (酒井忠稠) | 1682–1706 | Ukyō-no-suke (右京亮) | Junior 5th Rank, Lower Grade (従五位下) | 10,000 koku |
| 2 | Sakai Tadagiku (酒井忠菊) | 1706–1722 | Hida-no-kami (修理大夫) | Junior 5th Rank, Lower Grade (従五位下) | 10,000 koku |
| 3 | Sakai Tadatake (酒井忠武) | 1722–1731 | Ukyō-no-suke (右京亮) | Junior 5th Rank, Lower Grade (従五位下) | 10,000 koku |
| 4 | Sakai Tadaka (酒井忠香) | 1731–1788 | Hida-no-kami (修理大夫) | Junior 5th Rank, Lower Grade (従五位下) | 10,000 koku |
| 5 | Sakai Tadanobu (酒井忠言) | 1788–1791 | Sagami-no-kami (相模守) | Junior 5th Rank, Lower Grade (従五位下) | 10,000 koku |
| 6 | Sakai Tadae (酒井忠藎) | 1791–1833 | Hida-no-kami (修理大夫) | Junior 5th Rank, Lower Grade (従五位下) | 10,000 koku |
| 7 | Sakai Tadamasu (酒井忠毗) | 1833–1867 | Ukyō-no-suke (右京亮) | Junior 5th Rank, Lower Grade (従五位下) | 10,000->11,060 koku |
| 8 | Sakai Tadatsune (酒井忠経) | 1867–1871 | Ukyō-no-suke (右京亮) | Junior 5th Rank, Lower Grade (従五位下) | 11,060 koku |

=== Sakai Tadashige ===
Sakai Tadashige (酒井忠稠; April 27, 1653 – July 12, 1706) was the 1st daimyō of Tsuruga Domain in Echizen Province under the Edo period Tokugawa shogunate. Tadashige born at the Sakai clan residence in Edo, and was the second son of Sakai Tadanao of Obama Domain. His childhood name was Senchiyō. In 1682, on the death of his father, he received an estate with a kokudaka of 10,000 koku in Echizen Province. This marked the start of Tsuruga Domain. He later served as an Ōbangashira in the administration of the Tokugawa shogunate. His courtesy title was Ukyō-no-suke. His wife was the daughter of Doi Toshifusa of Ōno Domain. He died in 1706 and his grave is at the temple of Seisho-ji in Atago, Tokyo.

=== Sakai Tadagiku ===
Sakai Tadakiku (酒井忠菊; October 26, 1679 – March 22, 1722) was the 2nd daimyō of Tsuruga Domain in Echizen Province under the Edo period Tokugawa shogunate. Tadakiku was the eldest son of Sakai Tadashige. He became daimyō of Tsuruga on the death of his father in 1706. He was an Ōbangashira in 1714 and died in 1722. His first wife was a daughter of Hotta Masayasu of Omi-Miyagawa Domain, and he later remarried the daughter of Aoyama Tadashige of Kameyama Domain. His courtesy title was Hida-no-kami.

=== Sakai Tadatake ===
Sakai Tadatake (酒井忠菊; February 3, 1709 – September 21, 1731) was the 3rd daimyō of Tsuruga Domain in Echizen Province under the Edo period Tokugawa shogunate. Tadatake was the third son of Sakai Tadagiku. He was received in formal audience by Shōgun Tokugawa Yoshimune in 1715 and became daimyō on the death of his father in 1722. His courtesy title was Ukyō-no-suke. However, he was relieved of office due to a fire which burned down the clan residence in 1723. He died without heir in 1731.

=== Sakai Tadaka ===
Sakai Tadaka (酒井忠香; 1715 – December 3, 1791) was the 4th daimyō of Tsuruga Domain in Echizen Province under the Edo period Tokugawa shogunate. Tadaka was the 8th son of Sakai Tadagiku. He was posthumously adopted as heir to his brother Tadatake and became daimyō in 1731. In 1745, he served as Ōbangashira and in 1758 became a Sōshaban. He rose to the post of Jisha-bugyō in 1761 and wakadoshiyori in 1765. He retired in 1788 and died in 1791. His courtesy title was Harima-no-kami, later Hida-no-kami. His wife was a daughter of Mizuno Tadasada of Hōjō Domain.

=== Sakai Tadanobu ===
Sakai Tadanobu (酒井忠言; February 13, 1756 – March 27, 1799) was the 5th daimyō of Tsuruga Domain in Echizen Province under the Edo period Tokugawa shogunate. Tadanobu was the fourth son of Sakai Tadaka, and became daimyō on the retirement of his father in 1788 as all three of his elder brothers died in infancy. He served as Ōbangashira. In 1797 he retired, and died in 1799 at the age of 44. His wife was a daughter of Miura Akitsugu of Mimasaka-Katsuyama Domain. His courtesy title was Sagami-no-kami.

=== Sakai Tadae ===
Sakai Tadae (酒井忠藎; February 20, 1781 – July 8, 1833) was the 6th daimyō of Tsuruga Domain in Echizen Province under the Edo period Tokugawa shogunate. Tadae was the eldest son of Sakai Tadanobu. His courtesy title was initially Ukyō-no-suke, later Hida-no-kami. He became daimyō on the retirement of his father in 1797. His wife was a granddaughter of Arima Takasumi of Echizen-Maruoka Domain. He served as Ōbangashira and Osaka-johan. He died in 1833 at the age of 53.

=== Sakai Tadamasu ===
Sakai Tadamasu (酒井忠毗; July 26, 1815 – February 12, 1876) was the 7th daimyō of Tsuruga Domain in Echizen Province under the Edo period Tokugawa shogunate. Tadamasu was the fourth son of Sakai Tadae. His wife was a daughter of Sakai Tadamichi of Dewa-Matsuyama Domain; he later remarried to a daughter of Nagai Naosuke of Kano Domain. He became daimyō on the death of his father in 1833. He served as wakadoshiyori in the administration of the Tokugawa shogunate during three critical occasions.

In 1859, Russian general Nikolay Muravyov-Amursky led a fleet of seven vessels into Edo Bay, and demanded that Japan officially recognize Russian sovereignty over all of Sakhalin. Sakai and Endō Tanenori (of Mikami Domain) served as negotiators on the Japanese side, claiming that not only was Sakhalin Japanese territory, but so were the Kurile Islands, including Kamchatka peninsula. The second time was in 1861, when he met with British minister Rutherford Alcock and French minister Gustave Duchesne de Bellecourt over the murder of Henry Heusken. The third time was from 1863 to 1864, during negotiations with the British Chargé d'affaires Edward St. John Neale over reparation demanded due to the Namamugi incident, and with the French, British, Dutch and American delegations over the Shimonoseki Campaign. Although a strong supporter of the shogunate during the Bakumatsu period, he resigned his posts at the time of the Taisei hōkan and after the Battle of Toba-Fushimi, the domain submitted to the new Meiji government.

=== Sakai Tadatsune ===
Sakai Tadatsune (酒井忠経; September 26, 1848 – December 5, 1884) was the 8th (and final) daimyō of Tsuruga Domain in Echizen Province. Tadatsune was the fourth son of Sakai Tadamasu. His wife was a daughter of Itakura Katsuaki of Fukushima Domain. He became daimyō in 1867 when his father submitted to the Meiji government and served as imperial governor in 1869. When the domain was merged with Obama Domain in 1870, he subsequently served as imperial governor of Obama until the abolition of the han system in 1871.

== See also ==
- List of Han
