= Wakisaka Yasuori =

Japanese daimyō

Lord of Tatsuno
- In office 1841–1862
- Preceded by: Wakisaka Yasutada
- Succeeded by: Wakisaka Yasuaya

Personal details
- Born: March 30, 1809
- Died: January 10, 1874 (aged 64)

Wakisaka Yasuori (脇坂 安宅; March 30, 1809 – January 10, 1874) was a Japanese daimyō of the late Edo period, who ruled the Tatsuno Domain. He was appointed Lord of Tatsuno in 1841, and remained so until he abdicated in favour of his adoptive son Wakisaka Yasuaya in 1862.

== Shogunate positions ==
In 1854, Yasuori was appointed Jisha Bugyo ( 寺社奉行, lit. Magistrate of Temples and Shrines), and in 1851 became Kyoto Shoshidai (京都所司代), the senior Tokugawa Shogunate official in Kyoto. He held this position until 1857, when he was appointed Roju ( 老中, senior councillor), the highest position under the Shogun in the shogunate. In 1959, Yasuori was appointed as the Head of Foreign Affairs ( 外国事務主管), a relatively new position. In 1860, Yasuori resigned from all his Shogunate positions. However in 1862, after retiring as Lord of Tatsuno, he was convinced to return as Roju in order to conduct negotiations with imperial envoy Ohara Shigenori. He retired again that September, citing illness.

== Actions in office ==
In 1854, Yasuori reported the arrival of the American Admiral Perry, and the subsequent signing of the Convention of Kanagawa (Japanese 日米和親条約, lit. Japan–US Treaty of Peace and Amity) to the imperial court.

Later that same year, he was given an award by the Shogunate for his handing of the imperial palace fire which destroyed the entire Imperial Palace.

In 1857, Yasuori announced the arrival of United States consul general Townsend Harris to the Imperial court.

As Head of Foreign Affairs, Yasuori supported the government of Ii Naosuke. After Ii’s assassination, Yasuori acted to hide the death from other lords and the general population for some time, claiming that Ii was merely suffering from an illness. In November 1862 Yasuori was placed under house arrest for his part in this deception.

Preceded by Wakisaka Yasutada	Lord of Tatsuno; 1841–1862	Succeeded by Wakisaka Yasuaya
Preceded by Naitō Nobuchika	50th Kyoto Shoshidai; 1851–1857	Succeeded by Honda Tadamoto
