= Honda Tadamoto =

Japanese daimyō

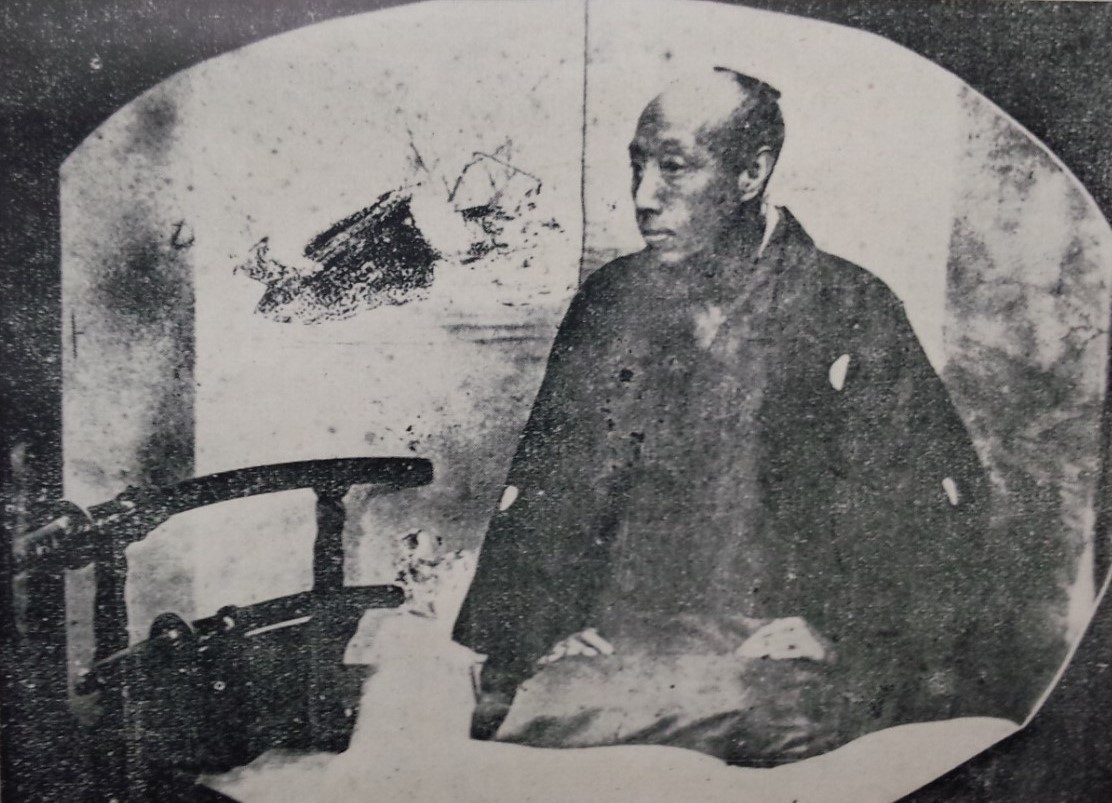

Lord of Okazaki
- In office 1835–1869
- Preceded by: Honda Tadataka
- Succeeded by: Honda Tadanao

Personal details
- Born: April 12, 1817 Edo, Japan
- Died: January 29, 1883 (aged 65)

Honda Tadamoto (本多 忠民; April 12, 1817 – January 29, 1883) was a Japanese daimyō of the late Edo period, who ruled the Okazaki Domain from 1835 during the Tenpō famine. One of his samurai retainers was the father of Shiga Shigetaka.

Preceded by Honda Tadataka	Lord of Okazaki; 1835–1869	Succeeded by Honda Tadanao
Preceded by Wakisaka Yasuori	51st Kyoto Shoshidai; 1857–1858	Succeeded by Sakai Tadaaki
