= Tsuruga District, Fukui =

Former district in Fukui prefecture, Japan

Coordinates: 35°38′42.7″N 136°3′19.8″E

Tsuruga (敦賀郡, Tsuruga-gun) was a rural district located in Fukui Prefecture, Japan.

== History ==
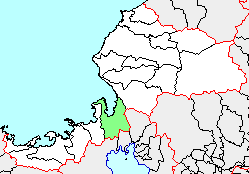
Map showing original extent of Tsuruga District in Fukui Prefecture: * yellow - areas formerly within the district borders during the early Meiji period (conterminous to Tsuruga-shi).

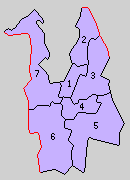
Colored areas are in this district.

Tsuruga District was an ancient administrative district, established during the late Asuka to early Nara period Ritsuryō reforms as part of Echizen Province. However, as the only part of Echizen to the west of the Kinome Pass, the area had stronger ties to Wakasa Province and Omi Province than to Echizen, and under the Edo period Tokugawa shogunate was mostly ruled from Wakaso-Based Obama Domain and its semi-subsidiary Tsuruga Domain.

Following the Meiji restoration, the area was assigned to Shiga Prefecture in 1875, and was only transferred to Fukui Prefecture in 1881. With the establishment of the modern municipalities system on April 1, 1889, the district was divided into one town (Tsuruga) and five villages.

=== District Timeline ===
The village of Matsubara was annexed by Tsuruga on April 1, 1937, which was then raised to city status. The remaining four villages were merged into Tsuruga on January 15, 1955, and Tsuruga District was dissolved.

== See also ==
- List of dissolved districts of Japan
