= Kyōto Shoshidai =

Political office in Edo-period Japan

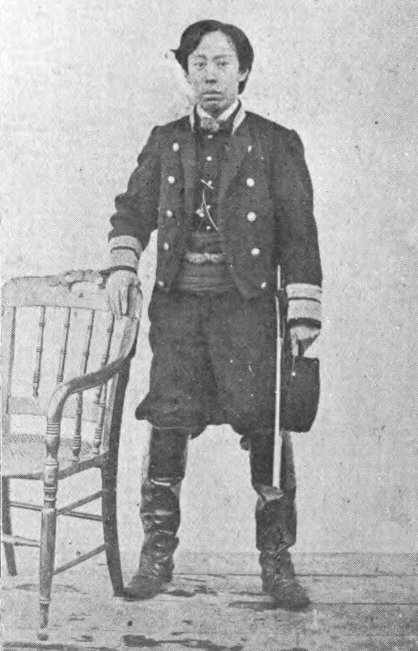
Matsudaira Sadaaki in Western uniform during the Bakumatsu period as the last Kyōto Shoshidai from 1864 to 1867

The Kyōto Shoshidai (京都所司代) was an important administrative and political office in the Tokugawa shogunate. The office was the personal representative of the military dictators Oda Nobunaga and Toyotomi Hideyoshi in Kyoto, the seat of the Japanese Emperor, and was adopted by the Tokugawa shōguns. The significance and effectiveness of the office is credited to the third Tokugawa shōgun, Tokugawa Iemitsu, who developed these initial creations as bureaucratic elements in a consistent and coherent whole.

The office was similar to the Rokuhara Tandai of the 13th- and 14th-century Kamakura shogunate. Tandai was the name given to governors or chief magistrates of important cities under the Kamakura shogunate. The office became very important under the Hōjō regents and was always held by a trusted member of the family.

== Description ==
The office was expanded and its duties codified as an office in the Tokugawa shogunate. The shoshidai, usually chosen from among the fudai daimyōs, was the shōgun's deputy in the Kyoto region, and was responsible for maintaining good relations and open communication between the shogunate and the imperial court. The shoshidai also controlled the access of the daimyōs to the Court. He was responsible for overseeing the Imperial court's finances, for ensuring the emperor's personal security, and for guarding the safety of the court. For example, the shoshidai supported the Kyoto magistrate or municipal administrator (the machi-bugyō) in making positive policy about firefighting for the royal palaces. In this context, the shoshidai collaborated with the administrator of the reigning sovereign's court (the kinri-zuki bugyō) and the administrator of the ex-emperor's court (the sendō-zuki bugyō), both of whom were shogunate appointees. The shoshidai also headed a network of spies tasked with discovering and reporting any covert sources of sedition, insurrection or other kinds of unrest.

As Governor-general of Kyoto and the surrounding eight provinces, the shoshidai was responsible for collecting taxes and for other duties within this region. The municipal administrators of Nara and Fushimi, in addition to Kyoto's municipal governance, the Kyoto deputy (the daikan), and the officials of the Nijō Castle were all subordinate to the shoshidai. He was empowered to hear suits-at-law and he had oversight control of all temples and shrines. The shoshidai had a force of constables (yoriki) and policemen (dōshin) under their command.

In addition to administrative duties, the shoshidai's participation in ceremonial events helped to consolidate the power and influence of the shogunate. For example, in September 1617, a Korean delegation was received by Tokugawa Hidetada at Fushimi Castle, and the shoshidai was summoned for two reasons (1) for the Koreans, to underscore the importance accorded the embassy, and (2) for the kuge courtiers in attendance, to make sure that they were properly impressed.

It was eventually established that service as governor of Osaka (the judai) was a prerequisite for appointment as shoshidai. A close, personal link with the shōgun was maintained through visits to Edo every five or six years to report directly to the shōgun. The conventional route of promotion was from governor of Osaka to shoshidai of Kyoto and then to rōjū (member of the Shogunate's governing council). The shoshidai earned 10,000 koku annually, in addition to the income from his own domain.

=== Abolition ===
In September 1862, a concurrent, nearly co-equal office was created, the "Kyoto shugoshoku", in an attempt to strengthen the Kōbu gattai faction (公武合体; Union of the Imperial Court and the Shogunate). The Kōbu gattai were feudal lords and Court nobles who sought a greater share of political power without actually destroying the shogunate, in opposition to a more radical faction, the tōbaku (倒幕, overthrowing the shogunate), which attracted men like Ōkubo Toshimichi. The related office of the shugoshoku had essentially the same functions as that of the shoshidai, but it was considered the senior of the two; and only members of the Matsudaira family were appointed.

The last Kyoto shoshidai, Matsudaira Sadaaki, came from a collateral Tokugawa branch. As a practical matter, it could be said that this office ended with his resignation in 1867; but matters were not so unclouded in that time. After the Imperial edict sanctioning the restoration of Imperial government (November 1867), there was a time lag before the office of shoshidai was abolished (January 1868) and affairs of the city were temporarily entrusted to the clans of Sasayama (Aoyama), Zeze (Honda) and Kameyama (Matsudaira).

== List of Kyoto shoshidai ==
Ordinal	Name	Dates	Shogun	Notes
1	Okudaira Nobumasa	1600–1601	Tokugawa Ieyasu	
2	Itakura Katsushige	1601–1619	Tokugawa Ieyasu; Tokugawa Hidetada	
3	Itakura Shigemune	1619-1654	Tokugawa Hidetada; Tokugawa Iemitsu; Tokugawa Ietsuna	Son of Itakura Katsushige
4	Makino Chikashige	1654–1668	Tokugawa Ietsuna	Daimyo of Sekiyado
5	Itakura Shigenori	1668–1670	Tokugawa Ietsuna	Grandson of Itakura Katsushige; Daimyo of Mikawa-Nakajima
6	Nagai Naotsune	1670–1678	Tokugawa Ietsuna	
7	Toda Tadamasa	1678–1681	Tokugawa Ietsuna; Tokugawa Tsunayoshi	
8	Inaba Masamichi	1681–1685	Tokugawa Tsunayoshi	Daimyo of Odawara
9	Tsuchiya Masanao	1685–1687	Tokugawa Tsunayoshi	
10	Naitō Shigeyori	1687–1690	Tokugawa Tsunayoshi	
11	Matsudaira Nobuoki	1690–1691	Tokugawa Tsunayoshi	
12	Ogasawara Nagashige	1691–1697	Tokugawa Tsunayoshi	Daimyo of Yoshida
13	Matsudaira Nobutsune	1697–1714	Tokugawa Tsunayoshi; Tokugawa Ienobu; Tokugawa Ietsugu	
14	Mizuno Tadayuki	1714–1717	Tokugawa Ietsugu; Tokugawa Yoshimune	Daimyo of Okazaki
15	Matsudaira Tadachika	1717–1724	Tokugawa Yoshimune	Daimyo of Ueda
16	Makino Hideshige	1724–1734	Tokugawa Yoshimune	Daimyo of Tanabe
17	Toki Yoritoshi	1734–1742	Tokugawa Yoshimune	
18	Makino Sadamichi	1742–1749	Tokugawa Yoshimune; Tokugawa Ieshige	Daimyo of Kasama
19	Matsudaira Sukekuni	1749–1752	Tokugawa Ieshige	Daimyo of Hamamatsu
20	Sakai Tadamochi	1752–1756	Tokugawa Ieshige	Daimyo of Obama
21	Matsudaira Terutaka	1756–1758	Tokugawa Ieshige	Daimyo of Takasaki
22	Inoue Masatsune	1758–1760	Tokugawa Ieshige	Daimyo of Hamamatsu
23	Abe Masasuke	1760–1764	Tokugawa Ieharu	Daimyo of Fukuyama
24	Abe Masachika	1764–1768	Tokugawa Ieharu	Daimyo of Oshi
25	Doi Toshisato	1769–1777	Tokugawa Ieharu	Daimyo of Koga
26	Kuze Hiroakira	1777–1781	Tokugawa Ieharu	Daimyo of Sekiyado
27	Makino Sadanaga	1781–1784	Tokugawa Ieharu	Son of Makino Sadamichi; Daimyo of Kasama
28	Toda Tadatō	1784–1789	Tokugawa Ieharu; Tokugawa Ienari	Daimyo of Utsunomiya
29	Ōta Sukeyoshi	1789-1782	Tokugawa Ienari	Daimyo of Kakegawa
30	Hotta Masanari	1792–1798	Tokugawa Ienari	Daimyo of Sakura
31	Makino Tadakiyo	1798–1801	Tokugawa Ienari	Daimyo of Nagaoka
32	Doi Toshiatsu	1801–1802	Tokugawa Ienari	Daimyo of Koga
33	Aoyama Tadayasu	1802–1804	Tokugawa Ienari	Son-in-law of Doi Toshisato; Daimyo of Sasayama
34	Inaba Masanobu	1804–1806	Tokugawa Ienari	Daimyo of Yodo
35	Abe Masayoshi	1806–1808	Tokugawa Ienari	Daimyo of Oshi
36	Sakai Tadayuki	1808–1815	Tokugawa Ienari	Daimyo of Obama
37	Ōkubo Tadazane	1815–1818	Tokugawa Ienari	Daimyo of Odawara
38	Matsudaira Norihiro	1818–1823	Tokugawa Ienari	Daimyo of Nishio
39	Naitō Nobuatsu	1823–1825	Tokugawa Ienari	Daimyo of Murakami
40	Matsudaira Yasutō	1825–1826	Tokugawa Ienari	Daimyo of Hamada
41	Mizuno Tadakuni	1826–1828	Tokugawa Ienari	Son-in-law of Sakai Tadayuki; Daimyo of Hamamatsu; later instituted the Tenpō Reforms
42	Matsudaira Muneakira	1828–1832	Tokugawa Ienari	Daimyo of Miyazu
43	Ōta Sukemoto	1832–1834	Tokugawa Ienari	Daimyo of Kakegawa
44	Matsudaira Nobuyori	1834–1837	Tokugawa Ienari	Son-in-law of Makino Tadakiyo; Daimyo of Yoshida
45	Doi Toshitsura	1837–1838	Tokugawa Ieyoshi	Adoptive of son of Doi Toshiatsu; Daimyo of Koga
46	Manabe Akikatsu	1838–1840	Tokugawa Ieyoshi	Daimyo of Sabae
47	Makino Tadamasa	1840–1843	Tokugawa Ieyoshi	Son of Makino Tadakiyo; Daimyo of Nagaoka
48	Sakai Tadaaki	1843–1850	Tokugawa Ieyoshi	First tenure; son of Sakai Tadayuki; Daimyo of Obama
49	Naitō Nobuchika	1850–1851	Tokugawa Ieyoshi	Son of Naitō Nobuatsu; Daimyo of Murakami
50	Wakisaka Yasuori	1851–1857	Tokugawa Ieyoshi; Tokugawa Iesada	Daimyo of Tatsuno
51	Honda Tadamoto	1857–1858	Tokugawa Iesada	Daimyo of Okazaki
52	Sakai Tadaaki	1858–1862	Tokugawa Iemochi	Second tenure
53	Matsudaira Munehide	1862	Tokugawa Iemochi	Adoptive son of Matsudaira Muneakira; Daimyō of Miyazu
54	Makino Tadayuki	1862–1863	Tokugawa Iemochi	Son of Matsudaira Norihiro and son-in-law of Makino Tadamasa; Daimyō of Nagaoka.
55	Inaba Masakuni	1863–1864	Tokugawa Iemochi	Daimyo of Yodo
56	Matsudaira Sadaaki	1864–1867	Tokugawa Iemochi; Tokugawa Yoshinobu	Last shoshidai; Daimyo of Kuwana; brother of Matsudaira Katamori.

== See also ==
- Bugyō
- Rokuhara Tandai
