= Sakai Tadashige =

Japanese daimyo (1827–1895)

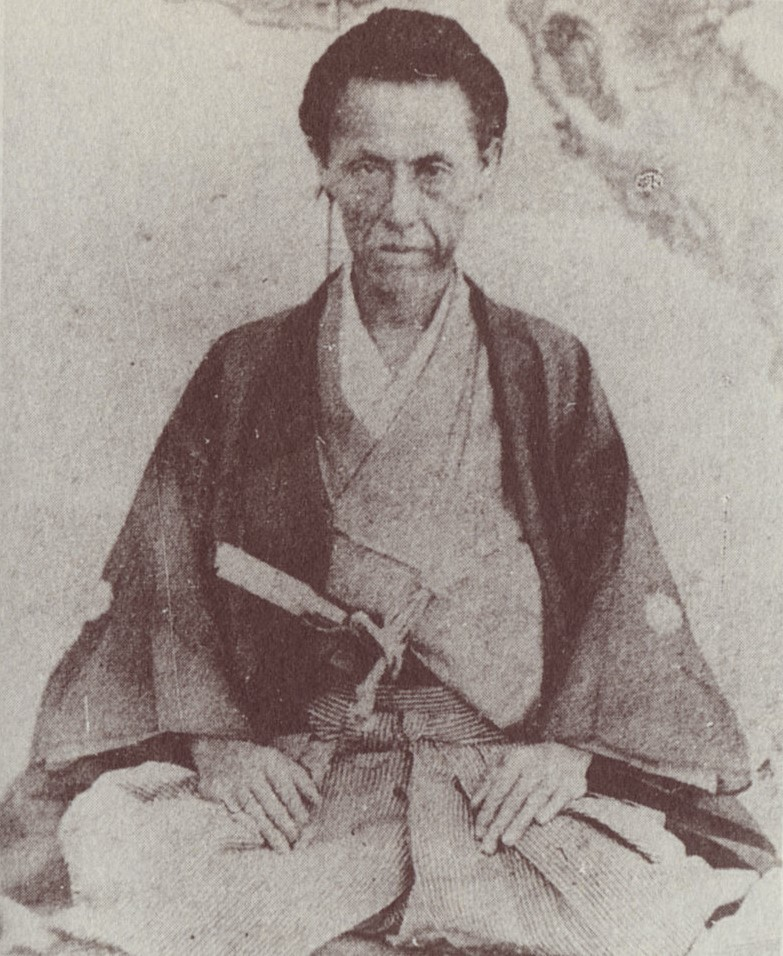

Lord of Himeji

Personal details
- Born: July 12, 1827
- Died: November 30, 1895

Sakai Tadashige (酒井忠績; 12 July 1827 – 30 November 1895) was the 8th Japanese Daimyō of the Sakai clan, Himeji Domain and the last Tairō (Chief Minister) of the Tokugawa Shogunate. He was appointed Tairō on 26 February 1865 after the assassination of Ii Naosuke, until his dismissal on 29 December 1865. A staunch supporter of the reforming of the Bakufu government and punitive actions towards the Chōshū Domain rebels, he tried to accelerate the Westernization of the Japanese military and purged Imperialists during his short term.
