= Jisha-bugyō =

Officials of the Tokugawa shogunate in Edo period Japan

Jisha-bugyō (寺社奉行; lit. "temple and shrine commissioner") was a position within the system for the administration of religion that existed from the Muromachi period to the Edo period in Japan. Appointments to this prominent office were always fudai daimyōs, the lowest-ranking of the shogunate offices to be so restricted.

This shogunate title assigns an official the responsibility of suspervising shrines and temples. This was considered a high-ranking office, ranked only slightly below that of wakadoshiyori but above all other bugyō.

== List of jisha-bugyō ==
- Tsuda Masatoshi (?-1650)
- Ōoka Tadasuke (1736–1751)
- Kuze Hirochika (1843–1848)
- Naitō Nobuchika (1844–1848)
- Matsudaira Tadakata (1845)
- Matsudaira Nobuatsu (1848–1885)
- Andō Nobumasa (1852–1858)
- Itakura Katsukiyo (1857–1859, 1861–1862)
- Honjō Munehide (1858–1861)
- Mizuno Tadakiyo (1858–1861)
- Inoue Masanao (1861–1862)
- Makino Tadayuki (1862)
- Matsudaira Yasunao (1865)

== See also ==
- Bugyō
