= Fudai daimyō =

Class of daimyō (warlords) during the rule of the Tokugawa Shogunate

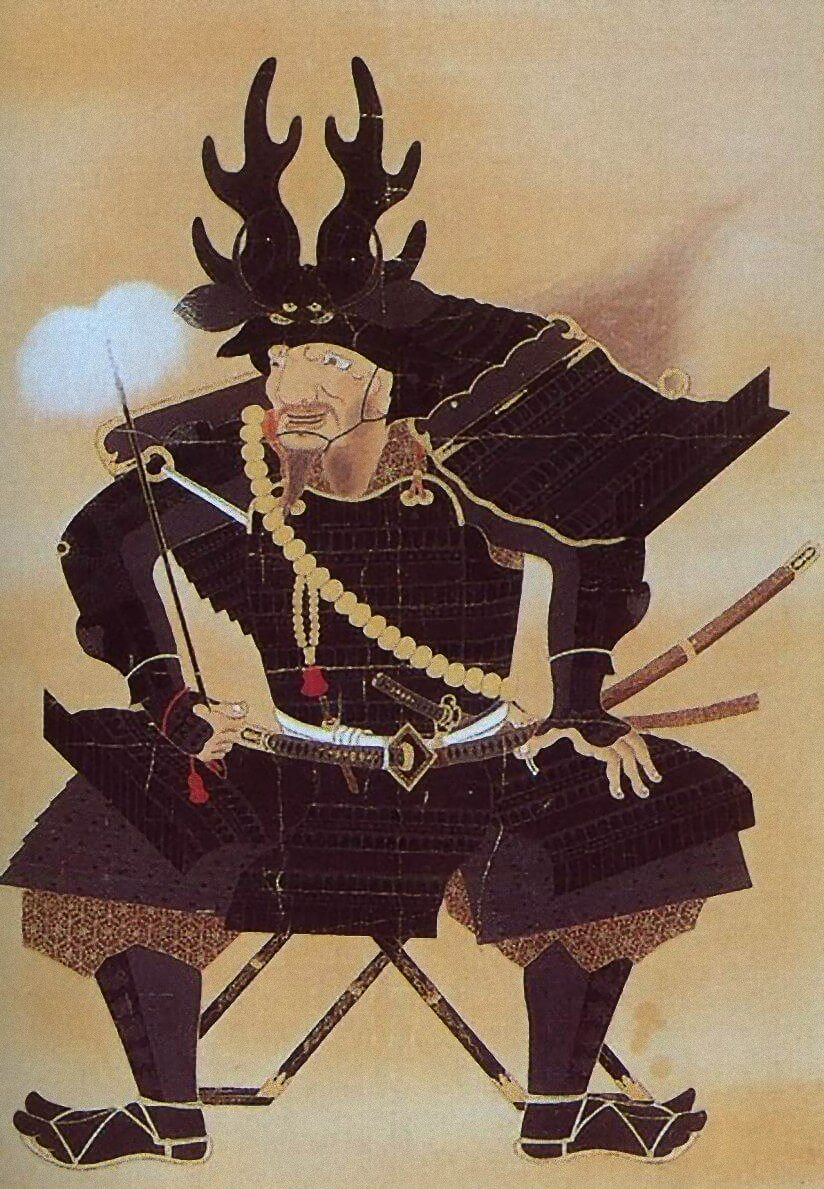
Honda Tadakatsu, a famous fudai daimyō of the early Edo period.

Fudai daimyō (譜代大名) was a class of daimyō (大名) in the Tokugawa Shogunate (徳川幕府) of Japan who were hereditary vassals of the Tokugawa before the Battle of Sekigahara. Fudai daimyō and their descendants filled the ranks of the Tokugawa administration in opposition to the tozama daimyō and held most of the power in Japan during the Edo period.

== Origins ==
Fudai daimyōs originated from the families and clans who had served the prominent Tokugawa clan before its rise to national primacy during the Azuchi–Momoyama period in the late Sengoku period, including the Honda, Sakai, Sakakibara, Ii, Itakura, and Mizuno clans. A number of other clans which were not retainers of the Tokugawa before the Azuchi–Momoyama period also came to be counted as fudai, such as the Ogasawara and the Doi. Honda Tadakatsu, Sakakibara Yasumasa, Sakai Tadatsugu, and Ii Naomasa — Tokugawa Ieyasu's "Four Great Generals" — were all pre-Edo period fudai who went on to become fudai daimyōs. In addition, some branches of the Matsudaira clan, from which the Tokugawa clan originated, were classed as fudai while allowed to retain the Matsudaira name.

According to "Mikawa Monogatari" which is authored by Ōkubo Tadataka, they are divided into Anjo Fudai, Yamanaka Fudai, and Okazaki Fudai. the vassals who served the Matsudaira clan when they had their base in Anjo Castle were Anjo Fudai, the vassals who served after they captured Yamanaka Castle were Yamanaka Fudai, and the vassals who served after they moved their base to Okazaki Castle were Okazaki Fudai. According to historian Yasutsune Owada, Anjo Fudai vassals has served the Matsudaira clan since the time of Ieyasu's grandfather, Matsudaira Kiyoyasu. Thereby, Ieyasu highly valued them, and placed great importance on the Anjo Fudai vassals. The clans which considered as Anjo fudai were the Ishikawa, Ōkubo, Naitō, Abe, Aoyama, Uemura, Hiraiwa, Naruse, Sakai, Honda and Watanabe clan.

== Edo period (江戸時代) ==
The birth of the fudai daimyō class began as Tokugawa Ieyasu (徳川家康) rose to power in Japan in the 16th century. Ieyasu's han (domains) increased as he gained prominence, and as his domains increased, he began to hand out landholdings to his vassals, so that one by one, many of them became daimyōs, the powerful feudal lords of the samurai warrior noble class. Ieyasu became the most powerful lord in Japan following victory at the Battle of Sekigahara in October 1600, displacing the Toyotomi clan and unofficially founding the Tokugawa Shogunate as his de facto military government with himself as the Shōgun. However, Ieyasu sought to consolidate his rule from potential usurpers, including the Toyotomi loyalists who were still fighting for Toyotomi Hideyori, the son and designated successor of Ieyasu's rival Toyotomi Hideyoshi, who had been an infant at the Battle of Sekigahara. The capital of the Tokugawa Shogunate was established in the eastern city of Edo, and Ieyasu filled his administration with fudai in fear of the tozama ("outside") daimyōs, who became Tokugawa vassals only after the battle. The fudai, in contrast to the tozama, typically ruled small domains in strategic locations along Japan's principal roads or in the Kantō region near Edo. High-ranking posts in the shogunate government (Bakufu) such as the rōjū, the wakadoshiyori, and the Kyoto Shoshidai normally went to fudai.

The Fudai daimyō lords usually characterized that with their domination in bureaucratic bodies of the central government, in contrast with the Tozama daimyō lords that mostly limited to their jurisdictions of their respective domains. However it was not always the case, as The Ii clan, Honda clan of Tadakatsu branch, and Sakakibara clan were also hereditarily acted as guardians of provinces, and traditionally served more in military roles than bureaucratic ones.

Occasionally, a family could be raised to or from fudai status. For instance, the Matsudaira clan to which Matsudaira Sadanobu belonged went from being a fudai house to being a shinpan (recognized relative) of the Tokugawa family. Also, a hatamoto who had an increase in income which raised his income level over 10,000 koku became a fudai daimyō.

== Bakumatsu and Meiji Restoration ==
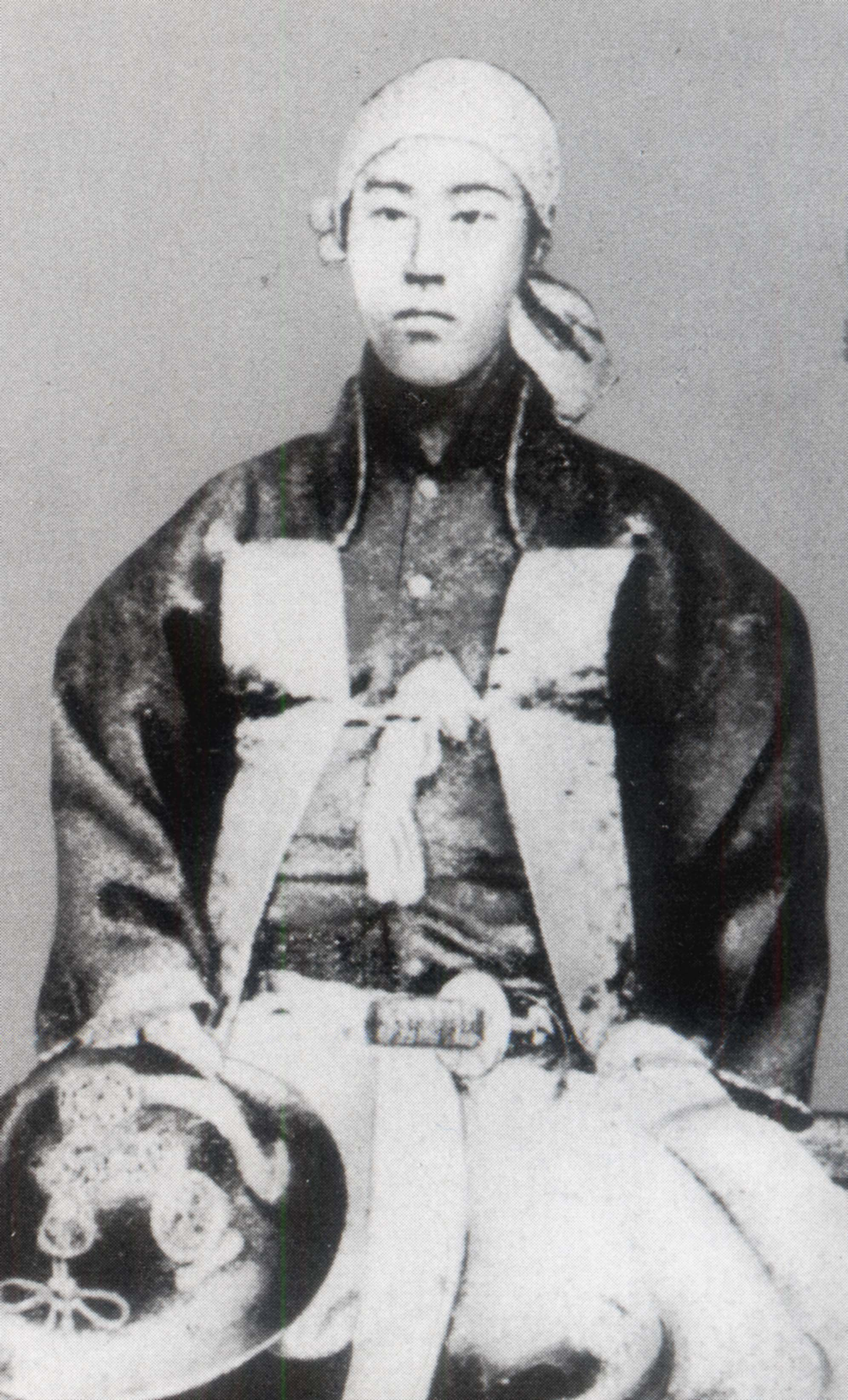
Hayashi Tadataka, a famous fudai daimyō of the Bakumatsu period.

Many fudai daimyōs were involved in the vigorous political activity of the Bakumatsu, the gradual decline of the Tokugawa Shogunate from 1853, and the renewed military activities which occurred in that period. Two such men of fudai daimyō background were Ogasawara Nagamichi and Itakura Katsukiyo, who were two of the last rōjū, and actively worked for reform and strengthening of the ailing shogunate. Others, such as Matsudaira Munehide, were involved in diplomacy and foreign affairs.

In the Boshin War of 1868 to 1869, when supporters of the Imperial Court rose up in the Meiji Restoration against the Tokugawa Shogunate, some fudai houses such as the Toda of Ogaki and the Tōdō of Tsu sided with the shogunate during the first battle at Toba–Fushimi. However, after the shogunate's loss there, many fudai houses did not side with the shogunate or with remnants of the Shōgun's former army under Enomoto Takeaki which moved northward to Hokkaido and eventually set up the Ezo Republic. Some remained neutral, while others (like the lords of Ōgaki and Tsu) switched allegiances and openly supported the new Imperial Japanese Army. Ogasawara Nagamichi and Itakura Katsukiyo led small groups of their retainers during the fight against the Imperial forces. However, their domains had already been occupied by the Imperial army, and were forced to participate in the war on the Imperial army's behalf. Only one fudai daimyō, Hayashi Tadataka of Jōzai Domain, willingly left his domain early in 1868, and led most of his retainer force on behalf of the armies of the former Shōgun, in the fight against the Imperial army. Also, a handful of fudai in the north of Honshu formed part of the Northern Alliance, fighting for the Alliance but not for the now-retired Shōgun.

Most of the fudai in the country entered the Meiji era peacefully, and ruled their domains until abolition of the domains in 1871. After this, the former families of fudai daimyōs transitioned into the kazoku in the new Japanese nobility system.
