= Nobutake Ōkōchi =

Japanese art historian, critic and businessman

- 大河内 信威
- Born: July 24, 1902; Tokyo, Japan
- Died: July 12, 1990 (aged 87); Tokyo, Japan
- Other names: Shin'ichi Ogawa; Nobutake Isono; Fūsenshi Isono; Fūsenshi Ōkōchi
- Education: Tokyo Imperial University
- Occupation: Art historian
- Spouse: Shizue Kawarazaki
- Father: Masatoshi Ōkōchi

Nobutake Ōkōchi (大河内 信威, Ōkōchi Nobutake; 24 July 1902 – 12 July 1990) was a Japanese art historian, critic and businessman who served as the fifth president of the Japan Ceramics Association from 1984 to 1990. Before that, he was also a sympathiser for the cause of the Japanese Communist Party.

== Biography ==
Although he did not enroll in a college or university, Ōkōchi was a member of the Urawa Higher literary group within the Shinjinkai. He studied at Tokyo Imperial University. Under the pseudonym of Shin'ichi Ogawa (小川 信一, Ogawa Shin'ichi), he worked for the Vanguard Theatre (前衛座, Zen'eiza), a Japanese theatre dedicated to countering the bourgeoisie, in 1927, along with other people. In 1929, Ōkōchi, along with Kiyoshi Miki and others, formed the Proletarian Institute of Science (プロレタリア科学研究所, Puroretaria kagakukenkyūjo), in which he was the secretary general. In 1930, he solicited the fund for the cause of the Japanese Communist Party, for which Miki contributed to. One year later, he was also the secretary general of the Japan Proletarian Cultural Federation (日本プロレタリア文化連盟, Nihon puroretaria bunka renmei). He worked with other left-wing groups on the evolution of capitalism in the second part of Analysis of Japanese Capitalism (日本資本主義発達史講座, Nihon shihonshugi hattatsu shi kōza).

During World War II, he worked for Riken as an executive in the Riken Konzern. After the Riken Konzern was disbanded, he began to study the history of ceramics. While publishing works on ceramics, he primarily published under the names of Nobutake Isono (磯野 信威, Isono Nobutake), Fūsenshi Isono (磯野 風船子, Isono Fūsenshi) or Fūsenshi Ōkōchi (大河内 風船子, Ōkōchi Fūsenshi). Ōkōchi supervised the opening of the Kakiden Gallery in 1978. He served as the president of the Japan Ceramics Association from 1984, succeeding Kō Segawa, until his death in 1990.

== Personal life ==
Ōkōchi was the eldest son of Viscount Masatoshi Ōkōchi, the third director of Riken. His younger brother was Nobuhiro Ōkōchi. He was the first husband of actress Shizue Kawarazaki.

=== Ancestry ===
Ancestors of Nobutake Ōkōchi

16. Manabe Akihiro
8. Manabe Akikatsu
4. Ōkōchi Masatada
18. Matsudaira Yasutō
9. Matsudaira Renko
19. Mankihime
2. Masatoshi Ōkōchi
20. Matsudaira Masakata
10. Matsudaira Masatomo
21. Matsudaira Atsu
5. Matsudaira Mineko
1. Nobutake Ōkōchi
24. Manabe Akihiro
12. Manabe Akikatsu
6. Ōkōchi Nobuhisa
26. Matsudaira Yasutō
13. Matsudaira Renko
27. Mankihime
3. Ichiko Ōkōchi
28. Mizoguchi Naoaki
14. Mizoguchi Naohiro
7. Mizoguchi Chōko
