= Murakami Domain =

Japanese feudal domain

Murakami Domain 村上藩
- under Tokugawa shogunate Japan
- 1598–1871
- Capital: Murakami Castle
- Area
  - Coordinates: 38°13′11.46″N 139°29′6.00″E
  - Type: Daimyō
- Historical era: Edo period
  - Established: 1598
  - Disestablished: 1871
- Today part of: part of Niigata Prefecture

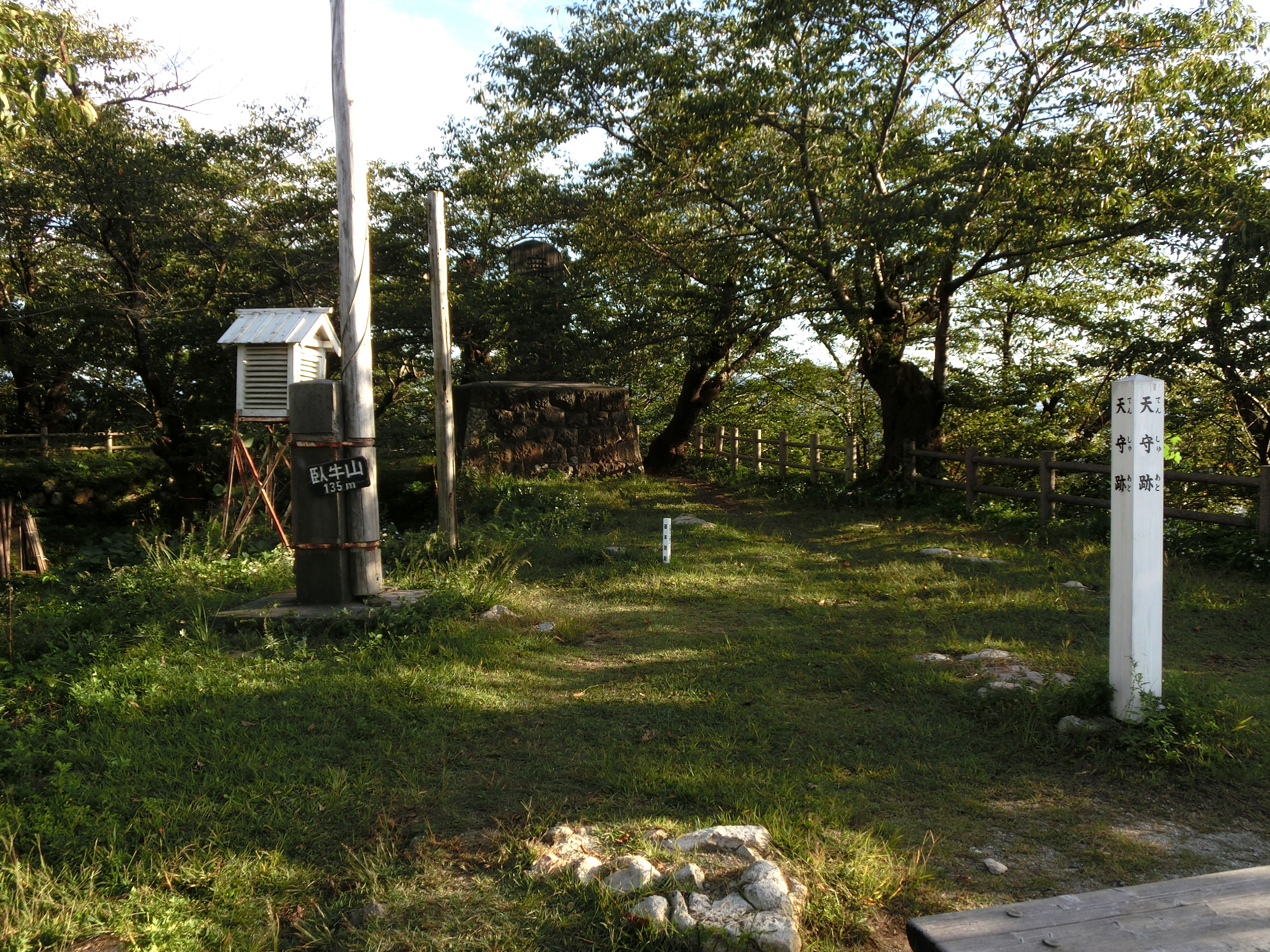
site of the donjon of Murakami Castle, administrative center of Murakami Domain

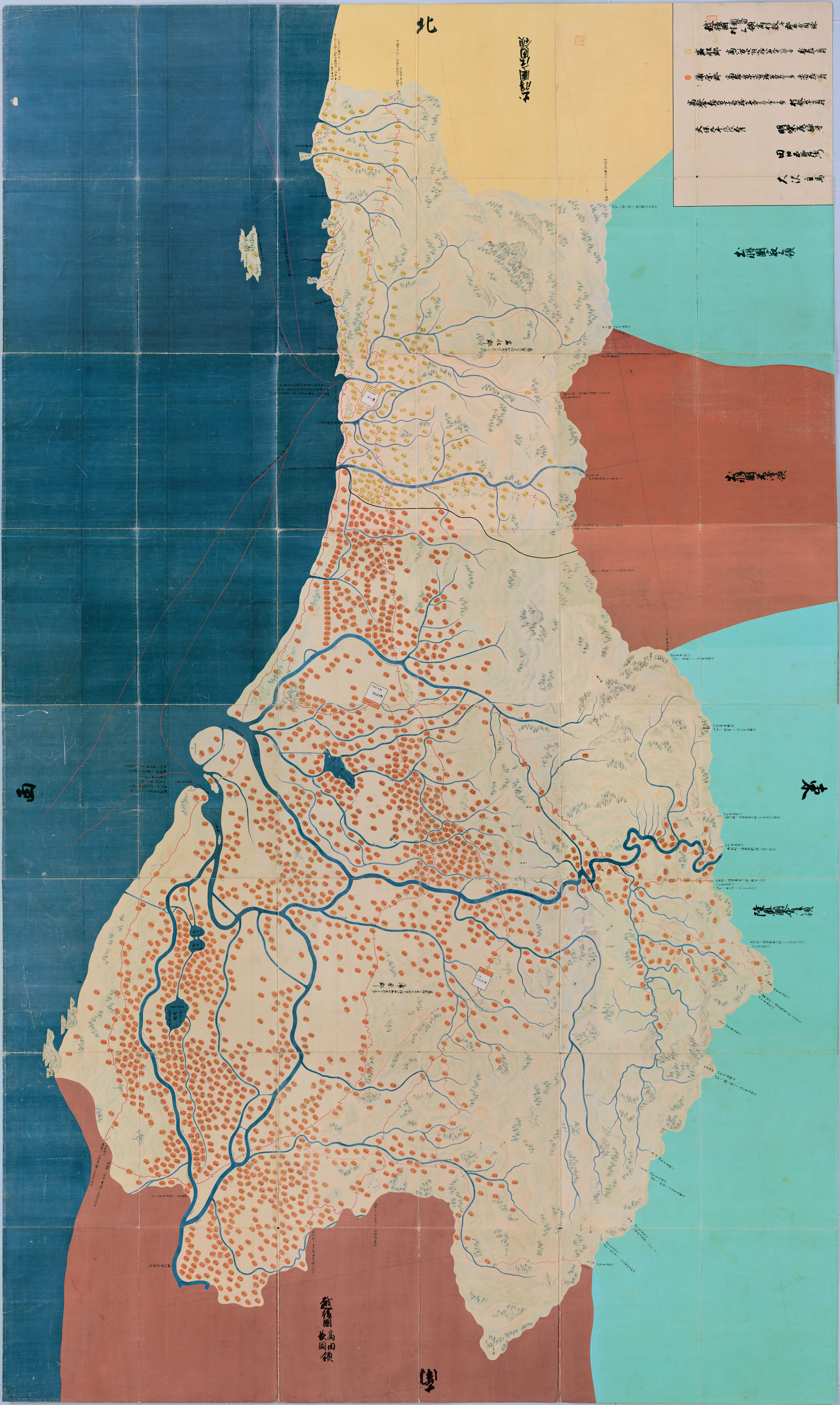
Shibata and Murakami Domains in the Edo period

Murakami Domain (村上藩, Murakami-han) was a feudal domain under the Tokugawa shogunate of Edo period Japan, located in Echigo Province (modern-day Niigata Prefecture), Japan. It was centered on Murakami Castle in what is now the city of Murakami, Niigata.

== History ==
During the Heian period, the area of Murakami Domain was part of a huge shōen estate called "Koizumi-shō", controlled by the Nakamikado clan, a cadet branch of the Fujiwara clan. Following the Genpei War, the area came under the control of the Minamoto clan, which appointed the Chichibu clan, relatives of the Hatakeyama clan as administrators. The Chichibu later changed their name to the Honjō clan. The Honjō built the first iteration of Murakami Castle during the Meiō period (1497–1501).

In 1453, someone with surname Murakami, and court title of Bitchu-no-Kami, who believed to be of the titular leader of Innoshima Murakami clan, was rewarded by Hosokawa Katsumoto of the Muromachi shogunate for his loyalty and facilitating the return of the Shugo clan to Iyo Province. Later, as the influence of the shogunate weakened, the Innoshima Murakami clan came under the control of a Sengoku daimyo. At the time of the Ōnin War, it is possible that they were already operating under the command of the Ōuchi clan, whose influence was expanding in the waters around the Seto Inland Sea, and as "lords of the sea," they supported the Ouchi clan's military power at sea. The Murakami clan pirates then influenced maritime logistics, resulting in the mid-16th century piracy in Japan. One of the most prominent Murakami clan leader was Murakami Yoshikiyo, whose pirates fought against the likes of Takeda Shingen and Uesugi Kenshin.

The Honjō greatly expanded their territory during the Sengoku period and became embroiled in the battles between the Uesugi clan and the Takeda clan. They pledged fealty to the Uesugi, and Murakami Castle became a major stronghold of the Uesugi against their powerful enemies to the north, especially the Date clan and the Mogami clan.

However, when Uesugi Kagekatsu submitted to Toyotomi Hideyoshi in 1590 and was transferred to Aizu, Echigo Province came under the control of Hori Hideharu and Murakami was assigned to his retainer, Murakami Yorikatsu in 1598 as a 90,000 koku holding. This is said to be the beginning of the Murakami Domain. However, there is much uncertainty about this. This is due to the short period of the Murakami family's residence, which lasted only two generations, and the fact that they were abolished as part of the Edo Shogunate 's policy of abolishing outside daimyo (feudal lords), resulting in a paucity of historical documents.

Yorikatsu was confirmed in his holdings after the Battle of Sekigahara by the Tokugawa shogunate. However, his son, Murakami Tadakatsu was dispossessed in 1618 for murdering one of his retainers and for the inability to maintain order in his household and was exiled to Tamba Province.

He was replaced by Hori Naoyori and the domain was increased to a 100,000 koku nominal kokudaka, although the actual revenues of the domain were closer to 170,000 koku. Under the Hori clan, the castle town was developed and expanded, and new industries were promoted. In 1642, his grandson, Hori Naosada died at age 7 without heir, and the domain came under attainder. The Hori clan survived through a cadet line at Muramatsu Domain.

The domain then went through a number of changes in control during a brief period. Honda Tadayoshi was transferred from Kakegawa Domain in 1644 and transferred to Shirakawa Domain in 1649. Matsudaira Naoyori from Himeji Domain arrived in 1649 and ruled to 1667 when we was returned to Himeji after widespread revolts over taxation. In 1667, Sakakibara Masamichi arrived from Himeji. During his tenure, the donjon of Murakami Castle burned down and was not replaced. His son, Sakakibara Masakuni was transferred to Himeji in 1704. The rotation between Murakami and Himeji continued, with Honda Tadataka arriving in 1704. His son, Honda Tadanaga was transferred to Kariya Domain in 1710. He was replaced by Matsudaira Terusada from Takasaki Domain, He returned to Takasaki in 1717, trading placed with Manabe Akifusa, a close confidant of Shōgun Tokugawa Ienobu. His adopted heir, Manabe Akitoki was transferred to Sabae Domain.

In 1720, Naitō Kazunobu was transferred to Murakami from Tanaka Domain. The Naitō continued to rule Murakami to the end of the Edo period, giving the domain much-needed stability. The 6th Naitō daimyō, Naitō Nobuatsu, served as Kyoto Shoshidai and 7th Naitō daimyō, Naitō Nobuchika, served as Kyoto Shoshidai, Osaka-jō dai and rōjū. The 8th daimyō, Naitō Nobutami died in 1868, so the domain was without a ruler going into the Boshin War. The domain initially fought against Shōnai Domain, but after the appointment of Naitō Nobutomi as daimyō, changed its allegiance to the new Meiji government. After the Meiji restoration, and the abolition of the han system in 1871, the domain became part of Niigata Prefecture.

== Holdings at the end of the Edo period ==
As with most domains in the han system, Murakami Domain consisted of several discontinuous territories calculated to provide the assigned kokudaka, based on periodic cadastral surveys and projected agricultural yields.

- Echigo Province
  - 30 villages in Mishima District
  - 81 villages in Iwafune District
  - 83 villages in Kambara District

== List of daimyō ==
#	Name	Tenure	Courtesy title	Court Rank	kokudaka
Murakami clan (tozama) 1598–1618
1	Murakami Yorikatsu (村上頼勝)	1598–1604	Suwo-no-kami (周防守)	Lower 5th (従五位下)	90,000 koku
2	Murakami Tadakatsu (村上忠勝)	1604–1618	Suwo-no-kami (周防守)	Lower 5th (従五位下)	90,000 koku
Hori clan (tozama) 1618–1642
1	Hori Naoyori (堀直寄)	1618–1636	Tango-no-kami (丹後守)	Junior 5th Rank, Lower Grade (従五位下)	100,000 koku
2	Hori Naotsugu (堀直次)	1636–1638	Hyōbu-shōyu (兵部少輔)	Junior 5th Rank, Lower Grade (従五位下)	100,000 koku
3	Hori Naosada (堀直定)	1638–1642	-unknown-	-unknown-	100,000 koku
Honda clan (fudai) 1642–1649
1	Honda Tadayoshi (本多忠義)	1643–1649	Noto-no-kami (能登守)	Junior 5th Rank, Lower Grade (従五位下)	100,000 koku
Echien-Matsudaira clan (shinpan) 1649–1667
1	Matsudaira Naoyori (松平直矩)	1649–1667	Yamato-no-kami (大和守), Jijū (侍従)	Junior 4th Rank, Lower Grade (従四位下)	150,000 koku
Sakakibara clan (fudai) 1667–1704
1	Sakakibara Masatomo (榊原政倫)	1667–1683	Shikibu-shōyu (式部少輔)	Junior 5th Rank, Lower Grade (従五位下)	150,000 koku
2	Sakakibara Masakuni (榊原政邦)	1683–1704	Shikibu-shōyu (式部少輔)	Junior 4th Rank, Lower Grade (従四位下)	150,000 koku
Honda clan (fudai) 1704–1710
1	Honda Tadataka (本多忠孝)	1704–1709	none-	-none-	150,000 -> 50,000 koku
2	Honda Tadayoshi (本多忠良)	1709–1710	Nakatsukasa-taifu (中務大輔); Jijū (侍従)	Junior 4th Rank, Lower Grade (従四位下)	50,000 koku
Ōkōchi-Matsudaira clan (fudai) 1710–1717
1	Matsudaira Terusada (松平輝貞)	1710–1717	Ukyō-no-taifu (右京大夫); Jijū (侍従)	Junior 4th Rank, Lower Grade (従四位下)	72,000 koku
Manabe clan (fudai) 1710–1720
1	Manabe Akifusa (間部詮房)	1710–1720	Echizen-no-kami (越前守)	Junior 4th Rank, Lower Grade (従四位下)	50,000 koku
2	Manabe Akitoki (間部詮言)	1720–1720	Shimōsa-no-kami (下総守)	Junior 5th Rank, Lower Grade (従五位下)	50,000 koku
Naitō clan (fudai) 1720–1871
1	Naitō Kazunobu (内藤弌信)	1720–1725	Buzen-no-kami (豊前守)	Junior 4th Rank, Lower Grade (従四位下)	50,000 koku
2	Naitō Nobuteru (内藤信輝)	1755–1725	Kii-no-kami (紀伊守)	Junior 5th Rank, Lower Grade (従五位下)	50,000 koku
3	Naitō Nobuoki (内藤信興)	1725–1761	Kii-no-kami (紀伊守)	Junior 5th Rank, Lower Grade (従五位下)	50,000 koku
4	Naitō Nobuakira (内藤信旭)	1761–1762	Buzen-no-kami (豊前守)	Junior 5th Rank, Lower Grade (従五位下)	50,000 koku
5	Naitō Nobuyori (内藤信凭)	1762–1781	Kii-no-kami (紀伊守)	Junior 5th Rank, Lower Grade (従五位下)	50,000 koku
6	Naitō Nobuatsu (内藤信敦)	1781–1825	Kii-no-kami (紀伊守)	Junior 4th Rank, Lower Grade (従四位下); Jijū (侍従)	50,000 koku
7	Naitō Nobuchika (内藤信親)	1825–1864	Kii-no-kami (紀伊守)	Junior 4th Rank, Lower Grade (従四位下); Jijū (侍従)	50,000 koku
8	Naitō Nobutami (内藤信民)	1864–1868	Buzen-no-kami (豊前守)	Junior 5th Rank, Lower Grade (従五位下)	50,000 koku
9	Naitō Nobutomi (内藤信美)	1868–1871	Buzen-no-kami (豊前守)	Junior 5th Rank, Lower Grade (従五位下)	50,000 koku

=== Naitō Kazunobu ===
Naitō Kazunobu (内藤弌信; November 13, 1658 – December 30, 1730) was a daimyō under the Edo period Tokugawa shogunate. Kazunobu was the grandson of Naitō Nobunari via his second son, Naitō Nobunari, who was a 5000 koku hatamoto. He was born in Edo and was adopted by Naitō Nobuyoshi of Tanagura Domain as his heir in 1673. He was received in formal audience by Shōgun Tokugawa Ietsuna the same year, and was granted the courtesy title of Kii-no-kami. He became daimyō of Tanagura the following year. In 1712, he was transferred to Tanaka Domain in Suruga Province. In 1712, he served as Osaka-jō dai, with a change in courtesy title to Bungo-no-kami and a promotion in court rank; however, no increase in kokudaka. In 1720, he was transferred to Murakami Domain. In 1725, he turned the domain over to his adopted son Naitō Nobuteru; however, Nobuteru died the same year, so he adopted Nobuteru's son Nobuoki instead and went into retirement. He died in 1730 in Edo. His first wife was a daughter of Ōta Suketsugu of Hamamatsu Domain. He later remarried to a daughter of Mori Tsunahiro of Chōshū Domain.

=== Naitō Nobuteru ===
Naitō Nobuteru (内藤信輝; 1681 – November 29, 1725) was the second Naitō daimyō of Murakami. Nobuteru was the third son of Naitō Nobuyoshi of Tanagura Domain. He was born in Tanagura and was adopted by Naitō Kazunobu as his heir in 1673. He was received in formal audience by Shōgun Tokugawa Tsunayoshi the same year, and was granted the courtesy title of Buzen-no-kami, which was changed to Iyo-no-kami in 1709. He became daimyō of Murakami on Kazunobu's retirement in 1725, receiving also the title of Kii-no-kami, but died after less than a month. His wife was a daughter of Hachitsuka Tokushige of Awa-Tomita Domain.

=== Naitō Nobuoki ===
Naitō Nobuoki (内藤信興; 1720 – June 7, 1780) was the 3rd Naitō daimyō of Murakami. Nobuoki was the second son of Naitō Nobuteru. He was born in Edo, and became daimyō at the age of 6 in 1725 on the death of his father. He was received in formal audience by Shōgun Tokugawa Yoshimune in 1736, and was granted the courtesy title of Kii-no-kami. He retired in 1761 after an uneventful tenure. He was granted the courtesy title of Daizen-no-suke in 1765. The same year, he took the tonsure. His wife was a daughter of Matsudaira Masashige of Nakatsu Domain. He died in Edo in 1780.

=== Naitō Nobuakira ===
Naitō Nobuakira (内藤信旭; 1744 – August 6, 1762) was the 4th Naitō daimyō of Murakami. Nobuakira was the eldest son of Naitō Nobuoki. He was born in Edo, and was received in formal audience by Shōgun Tokugawa Ieshige in 1758 and was granted the courtesy title of Buzen-no-kami. He became daimyō in 1761 on the retirement of his father and visited Murakami for the first time later that year; however, he died in Murakami the following spring at the age of 18, without heir. His wife was a daughter of Mori Shigenari of Chōshū Domain.

=== Naitō Nobuyori ===
Naitō Nobuyori (内藤信凭; 1748 – February 11, 1781) was the 5th Naitō daimyō of Murakami. Nobuyori was the second son of Naitō Nobuoki. He was born in Murakami, and adopted as posthumous heir upon his brother Naboakira's unexpected death. He was received in formal audience by Shōgun Tokugawa Ieharu in 1765 and was granted the courtesy title of Kii-no-kami. He died in Edo in 1781 at the age of 34. His wife was a daughter of Matsudaira Tadatsune later of Obama Domain.

=== Naitō Nobuatsu ===
Naitō Nobuatsu (内藤信敦; October 31, 1777 – May 23, 1825) was the 6th Naitō daimyō of Murakami. Nobuatsu was the eldest son of Naitō Nobuyori. He was born in Edo, and became daimyō in 1781 on the death of his father. In the year 1800 he was appointed a sōshaban and rose to the post of Jisha-bugyō in 1813. in 1817, he was appointed a wakadoshiyori followed by Kyoto Shoshidai in 1823. He died while in office in Kyoto in 1825. His wife was a daughter of Yanagisawa Yasumitsu of Yamato-Kōriyama Domain. He later remarried to a daughter of Matsudaira Sadanobu of Shirakawa Domain.

=== Naitō Nobuchika ===
Naitō Nobuchika (内藤信親; January 24, 1813 – May 14, 1874) was the 7th Naitō daimyō of Murakami. He was also known as Naitō Nobumoto (内藤信思). Nobuchika was the third son of Naitō Nobuatsu. He became heir in 1822 on the death of his elder brother, and became daimyō in 1825 on the death of his father. In the year 1843 he was appointed Jisha-bugyō and in 1849 became Osaka-jō dai. In 1850, he was appointed Kyoto Shoshidai and rose to the post of Rōjū 1851, holding that post until 1862. During that time, he was influential in the Bunsei reforms and the Kōbu gattai movement. His wife was a daughter of Matsudaira Sadanobu of Shirakawa Domain, author of the Kansei Reforms. He retired in 1864, turning the domain over to his adopted son, but continuing to influence politics to the extent that the domain became a member of the Ōuetsu Reppan Dōmei during the Boshin War and fought in the Battle of Hokuetsu against the Meiji government. He was pardoned in 1869 and died at the age of 63 in 1874.

=== Naitō Nobutami ===
Naitō Nobutami (内藤信民; 1850 – August 20, 1868) was the 8th Naitō daimyō of Murakami. Nobutami was the third son of Naitō Masatsuna of Iwamurada Domain. In 1860 he was adopted as heir to Naitō Nobuchika, and was received in formal audience by Shōgun Tokugawa Ieshige in 1863, and granted the courtesy title of Buzen-no-kami, later changed to Kii-no-kami. He became daimyō the following year and assisted the shogunate in the Second Chōshū expedition. In 1868, feigning illness, he refused calls by the shogunate and opened negotiations with the Meiji government, but opinion in the domain was divided, and due to the influence of Nobuchika, the domain sided with the Ōuetsu Reppan Dōmei during the Boshin War. With the defeat of the pro-Tokugawa forces in the Battle of Hokuetsu, he returned to Murakami and committed seppuku on August 28 at the age of 19.

=== Naitō Nobutomi ===
Naitō Nobutomi (内藤信美; August 31, 1857 – January 20, 1925) was the 9th (and final) Naitō daimyō of Murakami. Nobutomi was the eldest son of Okabe Nagahiro of Kishiwada Domain. In 1868, Narukami Castle had fallen to the forces of the Meiji government and Naitō Nobutami had committed suicide. Despite these conditions, the karō of Murakami, Torii Masayoshi, brought Nobutomo to Murakami as the adopted son and heir to Naitō Nobuchika. He was recognized as daimyō by the Meiji government, and appointed imperial governor of Murakami until the abolition of the han system in 1871 (to which there was tremendous resistance in Murakami). He relocated to Tokyo after 1871 and changed his surname to Okabe. He was subsequent ennobled as shishiku (viscount under the kazoku peerage system. His wife was a daughter of Matsudaira Tadakiyo of Shimabara Domain. He died in Tokyo in 1925.

== See also ==
- List of Han
- Abolition of the han system
