= Ōkōchi Masatada =

Japanese daimyō (1844–1901)

- 大河内 正質
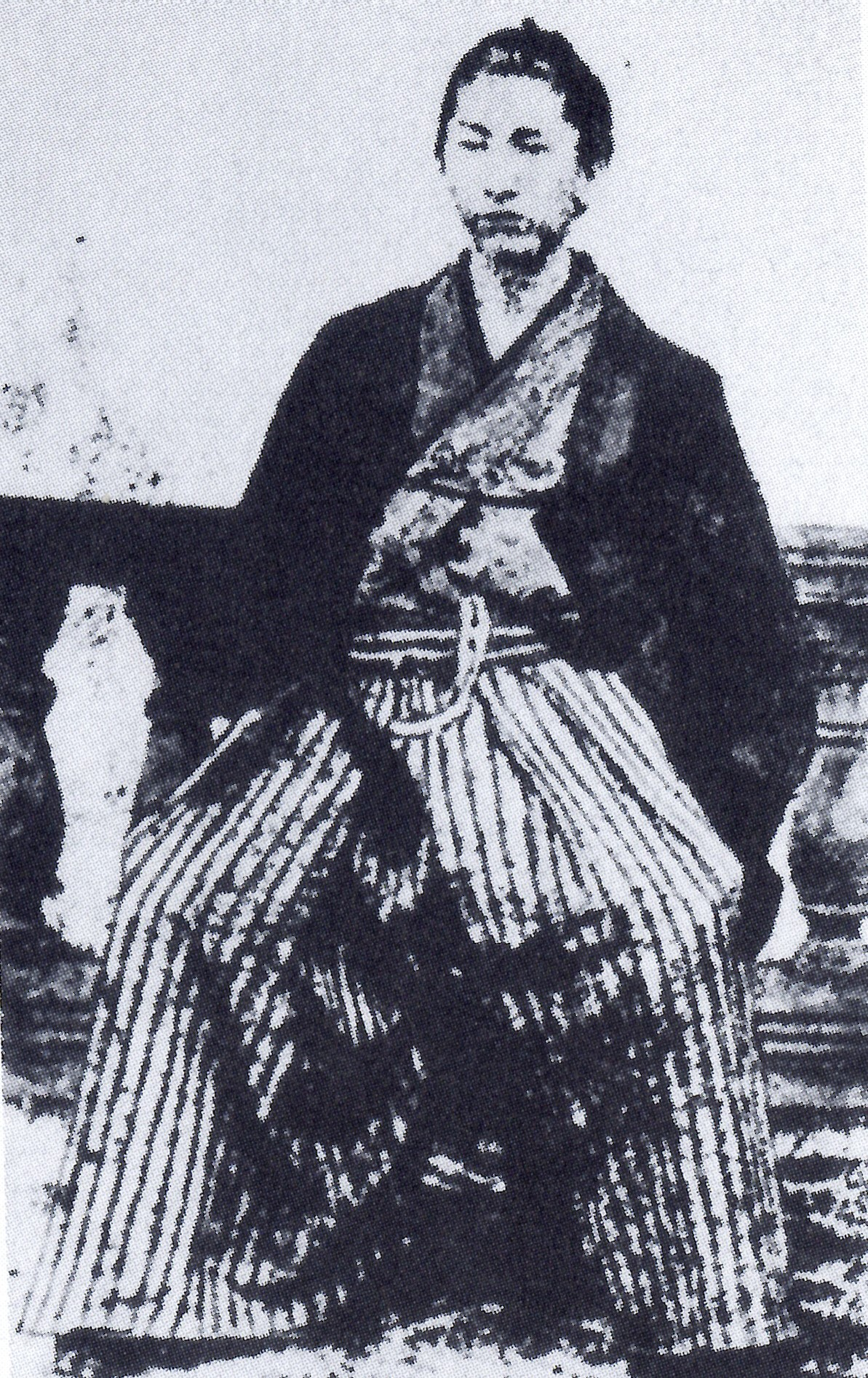

Personal details
- Born: May 27, 1844 Sabae Domain, Echizen Province, Japan
- Died: June 2, 1901 (aged 57) Tokyo, Tokyo Prefecture, Japan

Ōkōchi Masatada (Japanese: 大河内 正質; May 27, 1844 – June 2, 1901) was a Japanese daimyō. He was the last lord of the Ōtaki Domain.

== Biography ==
Ōkōchi Masatada was born in 1844 as the fifth son of Manabe Akikatsu, lord of the Sabae Domain.

== Boshin War service ==
Ōkōchi was the nominal leader of the shogunate army at the Battle of Toba–Fushimi in January 1868, where he was defeated by the revolutionary Imperial Japanese Army. On January 29, he retreated from his headquarters at Yodo Station.

During the war, Ōkōchi reportedly ate meat from the faces of slain soldiers as an accompaniment to sake.

Although Ōkōchi and Takenaka Shigekata were described by the Imperial authorities as the "ringleaders" (巨魁) of Toba-Fushimi, Ōkōchi was able to protect the Ōtaki Domain from retaliation by the new government by quickly surrendering Ōtaki Castle.

== After the war ==
Ōkōchi died in 1901. He was survived by his eldest son Ōkōchi Masatoshi, later associated with the Japanese nuclear weapons program in conjunction with Gen. Yasuda Takeo.
