= Tadayo =

- Gender: Male

Origin
- Origin: Japanese
- Meaning: Different meanings depending on the kanji used

Tadayo (written: 忠世) is a masculine Japanese given name. Notable people with the name include:

- Tadayo Fukuo (福王 忠世; born 1984), Japanese footballer
- Ōkubo Tadayo (大久保 忠世; 1532–1594), Japanese samurai and daimyō
- Sakai Tadayo (酒井 忠世; 1572–1636), Japanese daimyō
