= Momoko Kōchi =

Japanese actress (1932–1998)

- 河内桃子
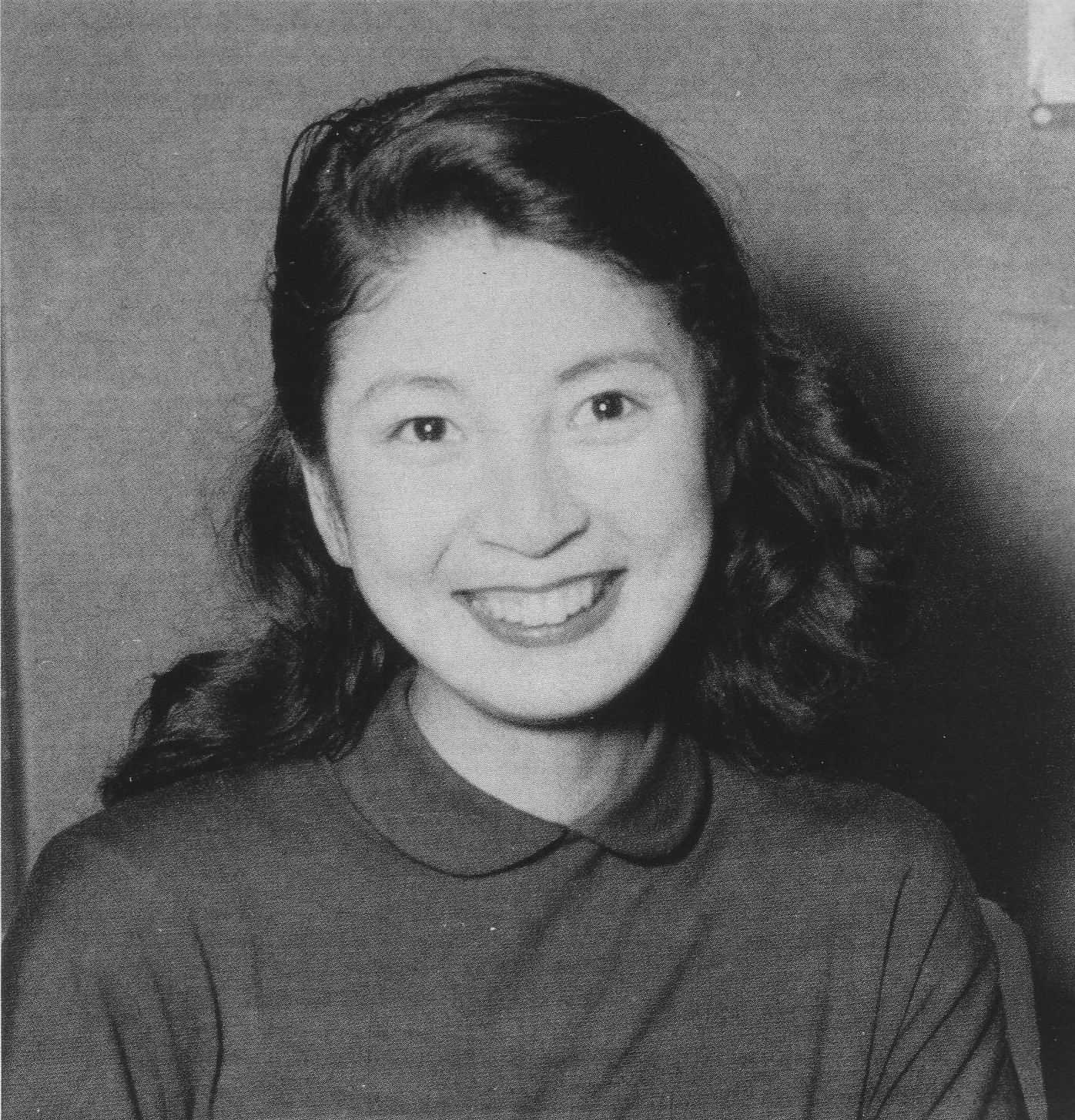
- Kōchi in 1954
- Born: Momoko Ōkōchi; 7 March 1932; Taitō, Tokyo, Japan
- Died: 5 November 1998 (aged 66); Shibuya, Tokyo, Japan
- Resting place: Yanaka Cemetery, Taitō
- Other name: Momoko Hisamatsu
- Occupation: Actress
- Years active: 1953–1998
- Spouse: Sadataka Hisamatsu (m. 1961; died 1998)
- Children: 1
- Parent(s): Nobuhiro Ōkōchi; Chieko Ōkōchi

Momoko Kōchi (河内 桃子, Kōchi Momoko) (7 March 1932 – 5 November 1998), born Momoko Ōkōchi (大河内 桃子, Ōkōchi Momoko), was a Japanese film, stage and television actress.

She is best known for her roles in the original Godzilla, playing the character of Emiko Yamane (a role she reprised in Godzilla vs. Destoroyah in 1995), and in The Mysterians, playing Hiroko Iwamoto.

== Personal life ==
Kōchi's paternal grandfather was Viscount Masatoshi Ōkōchi, the third director of Riken; her father, a painter, was the second son of Masatoshi. Her husband, television producer Sadataka Hisamatsu, with whom she had a daughter, was descended from the Hisamatsu-Matsudaira clan who ruled over the Imabari Domain.

=== Ancestry ===
Ancestors of Momoko Kōchi

16. Manabe Akikatsu
8. Ōkōchi Masatada
17. Matsudaira Renko
4. Masatoshi Ōkōchi
18. Matsudaira Masatomo
9. Matsudaira Mineko
2. Nobuhiro Ōkōchi
20. Manabe Akikatsu
10. Ōkōchi Nobuhisa
21. Matsudaira Renko
5. Ichiko Ōkōchi
22. Mizoguchi Naohiro
11. Mizoguchi Chōko
1. Momoko Ōkōchi
3. Chieko Ōkōchi

== Biography ==
After graduating from Japan Women's University's affiliated high school, Kōchi worked as an office lady, but she joined Toho through their "New Face" program in April 1953, along with Akira Takarada, Kenji Sahara, Yū Fujiki, and Masumi Okada (who later moved to Nikkatsu). Her first role was in A Woman's Heart Released (女心はひと筋に, Onna gokoro wa hitosuji ni) as Yaeko. One year later, she acted in movies directed by Kajirō Yamamoto.

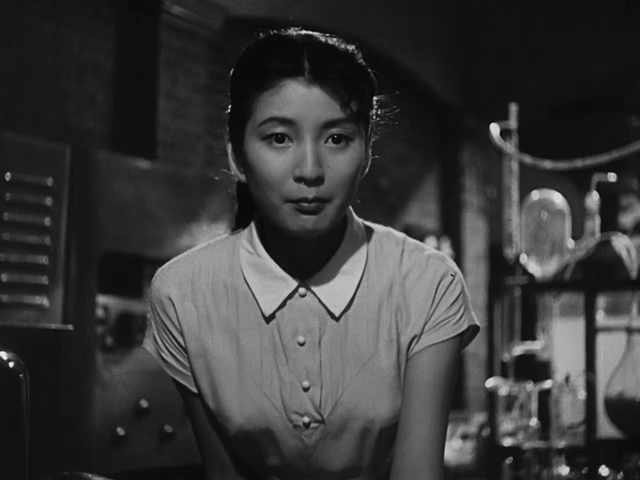
Kōchi in Godzilla (1954)

It was in one of Yamamoto's movies that his protégé, Ishirō Honda, saw Kōchi while he was making a science fiction film, Godzilla, with a topical storyline. Honda chose her to play the main female role of Emiko Yamane. While her role served as the center of the movie's romantic subplot, it provided the purpose for the resolution of the main story. Even though she was inexperienced as an actress at the time, her role was excellent as she hoped for, and she did very well in it.

After her success in Godzilla, Kōchi was typecast in other science fiction and kaiju films, including Half Human and The Mysterians. She left Toho in 1958 to pursue her formal study of acting, which she did not receive upon early discovery in 1953.

One year after leaving Toho, Kōchi did her formal study of acting with Tsutomu Yamazaki and Kumi Mizuno and joined Haiyuza Theatre Company. She then debuted as a stage actress in William Shakespeare's Twelfth Night. Her subsequent movie appearances have been reduced as a result and she mostly performed on stage (including The Merchant of Venice and Macbeth), while occasionally performing in television commercials as well as drama (including her role as Shōko Tsunashi in Thank You (ありがとう, Arigatō) from 1972 to 1973 with co-star Kiyoshi Kodama).

Kōchi made some appearances on TBS drama specials produced by Fukuko Ishii and written by Sugako Hashida. During her later years, she appeared as Toshiko Takahashi, a woman with Alzheimer's disease, in Wataru Seken wa Oni Bakari (渡る世間は鬼ばかり), with Kunihiko Mitamura. She also made some appearances in two-hour dramas such as Doyō waido gekijō (土曜ワイド劇場).

In 1995, Takao Okawara offered Kōchi the chance to reprise her role as Emiko Yamane in Godzilla vs. Destoroyah. Although Otawara was used to working with younger actors, he was impressed by Kōchi's complete training and concentration. All of her scenes were completed in one day, and her cameo appearance attracted the public throughout Japan. She later recounted her appearance in an interview with CNN: "After the first Godzilla movie people pointed at me saying, 'Godzilla, Godzilla, Godzilla.' As a young woman I hated Godzilla, so I thought, 'no more Godzilla for me.' But 41 years later I watched the film again and realized how great it was for its anti-nuclear theme."

On 19 July 1997, Kōchi's last film, Ryōkan (良寛), was released. Two days later, on 21 July, she made a guest appearance in a TBS Monday Drama Special, Enka Shōtarō no ninjō jiken nisshi (演歌・唱太郎の人情事件日誌).

Later in the same year, Kōchi toured the Tōhoku region with Haiyuza for performances of Yu no noren (ゆの暖簾). During the tour, she complained about her poor health, and she was diagnosed with colon cancer in January 1998. Her cancer spread rapidly, and she did not undergo surgery at the time of diagnosis. One year earlier, on 15 December, her final performance was in Tsuruoka, Yamagata.

Kōchi continued her hospitalisation until she died on 5 November 1998 at the Japanese Red Cross Medical Center in Hiroo, Shibuya from colon cancer at the age of 66. On 29 October, a week before her death, she was baptised into the Roman Catholic Church under her baptismal name of "Maria" by Father Masahiro Kondō of the Congregation of the Most Holy Redeemer. Her funeral was held on 9 November at St. Ignatius Church. Her grave is at Yanaka Cemetery in Taitō.

Due to Kōchi's roles in Catholic religious radio programs including Light of the Heart (心のともしび, Kokoro no Tomoshibi) and Taiyō no hohoemi (太陽のほほえみ), she was congratulated by Pope John Paul II with two awards in 1996.

== Episodes ==
- Since childhood, Kōchi showed off her photograph, "My Lover," in which she was depicted with her grandfather Masatoshi.
- On 31 December 1957, Kōchi visited São Paulo for the opening of Toho's branch in Brazil with another Toho actress, Machiko Kitagawa (who would later become the wife of Kiyoshi Kodama). They then went to New York City in the United States to participate in the Japanese cinema exhibition. On 12 February 1958, they returned to Japan. At the time, worldwide travel liberalisation was still underway, and their visits to São Paulo and New York City became very valuable.

== Selected filmography ==
=== Film ===
Year	Title	Role	Notes
1953	A Woman's Heart Released (女心はひと筋に, Onna gokoro wa hitosuji ni)	Yaeko	
1954	Take-chan shacho zenpen (坊ちゃん社員 前篇)	Mariko	
1954	Zoku Take-chan shacho (続・坊ちゃん社員)	Mariko	
1954	Mizugi no hanayome (水着の花嫁)	Chiiko	
1954	Godzilla	Emiko Yamane	
1955	Izumi e no michi (泉へのみち)	Ume Ogawa	
1955	Yuki no koi (雪の炎)	Yayoi Kōjima	
1955	Seifuku no otome tachi (制服の乙女たち)	Yukie Miyake	
1955	Sanjūsan go sha otonashi (33号車応答なし)		
1955	Half Human	Machiko Takeno	
1955	Aoi kajitsu (青い果実)	Chieko	
1956	Okusama wa daigakusei (奥様は大学生)	Yoshiko Okamoto	
1956	Ikasama shinshiroku (イカサマ紳士録)	Masako	
1956	Konyaku sanbadori (婚約三羽鳥)	Eiko	
1956	Norihei no daigaku (のり平の浮気大学)		
1956	Ano musume ga nai teru hatoba (あの娘がないてる波止場)	Maki	
1956	Ōabare cha cha musume (大暴れチャッチャ娘)	Hatsuko	
1956	Hadashi no seishun (裸足の青春)		
1956	Tenjōtaifū (天上大風)	Atsuko Shiraishi	
1957	Hoshizora no machi (星空の街)	Kumiko Nakagawa	
1957	Taian kichijitsu (大安吉日)	Michiyo Hiraoka	
1957	Goyōkiki monogatari (御用聞き物語)	Yūko	
1957	Jirochō gaiden: Ōabare Santarō gasa (次郎長意外伝 大暴れ三太郎笠)	Okyō	
1957	Nemuri kyōshirōburaihikae dainiwa madokadzuki sappō (眠狂四郎無類控 第二話 円月殺法)	Senya	
1957	`Dōbu~tsuen monogatari' yori zō (「動物園物語」より 象)	Yoshiko	
1957	A Rainbow Plays in My Heart (わが胸に虹は消えず, Waga mune ni niji wa kiezu)	Ikuko Asō	
1957	Yoru no kamome (夜の鴎)	Harue	
1957	Datsugoku-shū (脱獄囚)	Ikuko Koide	
1957	The Mysterians	Hiroko Iwamoto	
1958	The Badger Palace (大当り狸御殿, Ōatari tanuki goten) aka The Princess of Badger Palace		
1958	A Holiday in Tokyo (東京の休日, Tōkyō no kyūjitsu)		
1958	Furankī no boku wa san-ninmae (フランキーの僕は三人前)	Sayoko	
1958	O Tora-san dai hanjō (おトラさん大繁盛)	Taeko Inohara	
1959	Date sōdō fūun roku jū ni man ishi (伊達騒動 風雲六十二万石)	Orie	
1960	Onna no saka (女の坂)	Yumi	
1961	Na mo naku mazushiku utsukushiku (名もなく貧しく美しく)	Sensei Kijima	
1967	Koto yūshū ane imō to (古都憂愁 姉いもうと)	Etowāru's mother	
1967	Wakai tokei-dai (若い時計台)	Aya Koyanagi	
1969	Yūhi ni mukau (夕陽に向かう)	Sanae Takayama	
1971	Ama kara monogatari onna no asa (あまから物語 おんなの朝)	Kinuko	
1973	Otoko janai ka tōshi manman (男じゃないか 闘志満々)	Kiku Hayakawa	
1973	Tokimeki (ときめき)	Nami Sunaga	
1983	Konnichiwa hānesu (こんにちはハーネス)	Natsu Itami	
1984	Honeymoon (蜜月, Mitsugetsu)	Mitsuko's mother	
1985	Bodaiju no oka (菩提樹の丘)	Ayako Yūki	
1985	Lost Chapter of Snow: Passion (雪の断章 情熱, Yuki no danshō jōnetsu)	Kane	
1986	Tabiji mura de ichiban no kubitsuri no ki (旅路 村でいちばんの首吊りの木)	Tomiko	
1987	Tora-san Plays Daddy	Kimiko	
1993	Gurenge (紅蓮華)	Yoshino Nakata	
1995	Godzilla vs. Destoroyah	Emiko Yamane	

=== TV Series ===
Year	Title	Role	Notes
1962-1966	Judgment (判決, Hanketsu)	Keiko Inoue	
1967-1968	Atsumi Kiyoshi no naite tamaru ka (渥美清の泣いてたまるか)		
1972-1973	Thank You (ありがとう, Arigatō)	Shōko Tsunashi	
1978	Yūrei kaigan (幽霊海岸)		
1979	Enzen chizu (沿線地図)	Tokiko Matsumoto	
1982	Matsumoto Seichō no Ekiro (松本清張の駅路)		
1994	Sister (妹よ, Imōto yo)	Takako Matsui	
1996-1997	Wataru Seken wa Oni Bakari (渡る世間は鬼ばかり)	Toshiko Takahashi	
1997	Enka Shōtarō no ninjō jiken nisshi (演歌・唱太郎の人情事件日誌)		

== See also ==
- Sanezumi Fujimoto
