= Nobuhiro Ōkōchi =

Japanese painter

- 大河内 信敬
- Born: 21 August 1903; Tokyo, Japan
- Died: 1 December 1967 (aged 64); Tokyo, Japan
- Education: Hongō Painting Institute
- Alma mater: Meiji University
- Known for: Painting
- Spouse: Chieko Ōkōchi
- Elected: Kōfūkai

Nobuhiro Ōkōchi (大河内 信敬, Ōkōchi Nobuhiro; 21 August 1903 – 1 December 1967) was a Japanese painter.

== Biography ==
In 1918, Ōkōchi studied watercolor under Sanchi Itakura and printmaking under Kishio Koizumi as well as other methods under Okada Saburōsuke. He contributed to the magazine You and I (きみ と ぼく, Kimi to boku) in 1922. He graduated from the Meiji University Department of Economics in 1928 and studied at Hongō Painting Institute under Manjirō Terauchi in 1930. Ōkōchi participated in the 1931 Nihon Hanga Kyōkai exhibition.

In 1933, Ōkōchi's painting, A corner of the room (画室の一隅, Gashitsu no ichigū), won the fourteenth Emperor Exhibition prize from the Imperial Art Academy. By 1937, he was researching art from Europe. Ōkōchi became a member of Kōfūkai in 1940. He and Kanemon Asai as well as others formed Shinjukai in 1947.

== Personal life ==
Ōkōchi was the second son of Viscount Masatoshi Ōkōchi, the director of Riken, and the daughter of Ōkōchi Nobuhisa. Chieko was his wife. His daughter with her was actress Momoko Kōchi.

=== Ancestry ===
Ancestors of Nobuhiro Ōkōchi

16. Manabe Akihiro
8. Manabe Akikatsu
4. Ōkōchi Masatada
18. Matsudaira Yasutō
9. Matsudaira Renko
19. Mankihime
2. Masatoshi Ōkōchi
20. Matsudaira Masakata
10. Matsudaira Masatomo
21. Matsudaira Atsu
5. Matsudaira Mineko
1. Nobuhiro Ōkōchi
24. Manabe Akihiro
12. Manabe Akikatsu
6. Ōkōchi Nobuhisa
26. Matsudaira Yasutō
13. Matsudaira Renko
27. Mankihime
3. Ichiko Ōkōchi
28. Mizoguchi Naoaki
14. Mizoguchi Naohiro
7. Mizoguchi Chōko
