= Sabae Domain =

Feudal domain of Edo period Japan

Sabae Domain 鯖江藩
- under Tokugawa shogunate Japan
- 1720–1871
- Capital: Sabae jin'ya
- Area
  - Coordinates: 35°56′41″N 136°11′2.42″E
  - Type: Daimyō
- Historical era: Edo period
  - Established: 1720
  - Disestablished: 1871
- Today part of: Fukui Prefecture

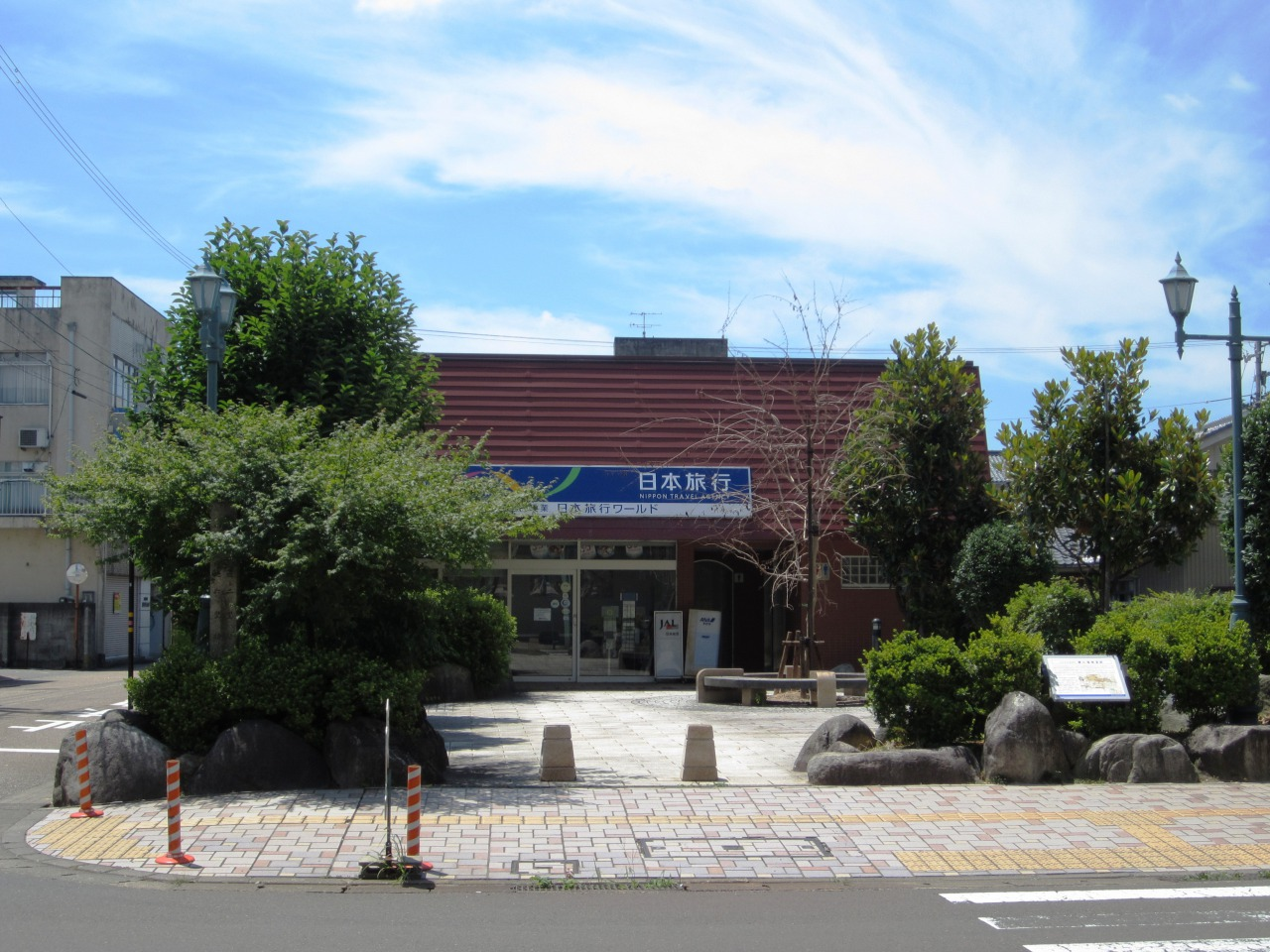
site of Sabae Jin'ya

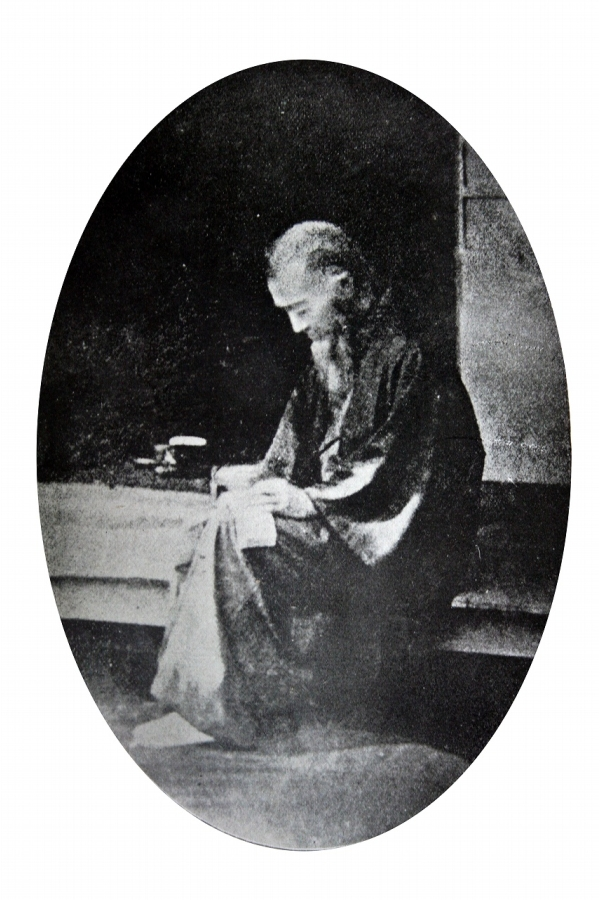
Manabe Akikatsu, 7th daimyō of Sabae

Sabae Domain (鯖江藩, Sabae-han) was a feudal domain under the Tokugawa shogunate of Edo period Japan. It was based at Sabae Jin'ya in Echizen Province in what is now part of modern-day Sabae, Fukui. It was ruled for all of its history by the Manabe clan.

== History ==
In 1721, the daimyō of Murakami Domain in Echigo Province, Manabe Akitoki was transferred to a newly created fief with a kokudaka of 50,000 koku centered in Sabae. Akitoki's elder brother was a sōbayonin to Shōgun Tokugawa Ienobu, with great influence over the shōgun, and his successor Tokugawa Ietsugu. However, under Tokugawa Yoshimune he was purged from office and the Manabe clan fell from favour. Manabe Akitoki's relocation was part of this punitive action - although the new domain had the same nominal kokudaka, it was located close to the eyes of Fukui Domain and extensive tenryō lands and was not ranked as a "castle-holding domain", but as a less prestigious jin'ya domain. Permission to layout a jōkamachi was not granted until 1722. The move all but bankrupted the Manabe clan. The Bakumatsu period Manabe Akikatsu served in a variety of positions in the Tokugawa shogunate, including Kyoto Shoshidai and rōjū, and implemented numerous fiscal reforms. He was also influential in the negotiations for the Harris Treaty and supported Ii Naosuke's Kōbu gattai policy towards the Imperial court, after Ii's assassination, he quickly fell from favour, and the domain was reduced to 40,000 koku. Following the Meiji Restoration, the final daimyo, Manabe Akimichi served as Imperial Governor from 1868 to the abolition of the han system in 1871.

At Sabae, Bankei-ji was the family temple for the ruling Manabe clan. Its gate was built in 1849.

== Holdings at the end of the Edo period ==
Unlike most domains in the han system, which consisted of several discontinuous territories calculated to provide the assigned kokudaka, based on periodic cadastral surveys and projected agricultural yields, Miharu Domain was a compact and continuous holding.

- Echizen Province
  - 86 villages in Inadate District
  - 9 villages in Nyū District

== List of daimyō ==
#	Name	Tenure	Courtesy title	Court Rank	kokudaka
Manabe clan (fudai) 1720–1871
1	Manabe Akitoki (間部詮言)	1720-1724	Shimōsa-no-kami (下総守)	Junior 5th Rank, Lower Grade (従五位下)	50,000 koku
2	Manabe Akimichi (間部詮方)	1724–1761	Tango-no-kami (丹後守)	Junior 5th Rank, Lower Grade (従五位下)	50,000 koku
3	Manabe Akinaka (間部詮央)	1761–1771	Shuzen-no-kami (主膳正)	Junior 5th Rank, Lower Grade (従五位下)	50,000 koku
4	Manabe Akitō (間部詮茂)	1771–1786	Shimōsa-no-kami (下総守)	Junior 5th Rank, Lower Grade (従五位下)	50,000 koku
5	Manabe Akihiro (間部詮熙)	1786–1812	Wakasa-no-kami (若狭守)	Junior 5th Rank, Lower Grade (従五位下)	50,000 koku
6	Manabe Akisane (間部詮允)	1812–1814	Shuzen-no-kami (主膳正)	Junior 5th Rank, Lower Grade (従五位下)	50,000 koku
7	Manabe Akikatsu (間部詮勝)	1814–1862	Shimōsa-no-kami (下総守))	Junior 5th Rank, Lower Grade (従五位下)	50,000->40,000 koku
8	Manabe Akizane (間部詮実)	1862–1864	Awa-no-kami (安房守)	Junior 5th Rank, Lower Grade (従五位下)	40,000 koku
9	Manabe Akimichi (間部詮道)	1864–1871	Shimōsa-no-kami (下総守)	Junior 5th Rank, Lower Grade (従五位下)	40,000 koku

=== Manabe Akitoki ===
Manabe Akitoki (間部詮言; June 8, 1690 – October 4, 1724) was the 2nd Manabe daimyō of Murakami Domain and the 1st daimyō of Sabae Domain and 2nd hereditary chieftain of the Manabe clan. His courtesy title was Shimōsa-no-kami, and his Court rank was Junior Fifth Rank, Lower Grade. He was adopted by his elder brother Manabe Akifusa as heir in 1708, and was received in formal audience by Shōgun Tokugawa Tsunayoshi the same year. In 1720, became daimyō on his brother's death. The same year, he was transferred from Murakami to the newly created domain of Sabae by ShōgunTokugawa Yoshimune as part of the purge of the Manabe clan due to then influence it had over his predecessors Tokugawa Ienobu and Tokugawa Ietsugu. Although Sabae had nominally the same kokudaka as Murakami, it lacked then prestige of being a "castle-holding domain" and was surrounded by the powerful Fukui Domain and tenryō territories, so in effect the transfer was a demotion. The domain also lacked a jōkamachi, or even a jin'ya from which the domain could be managed. Akitoki died in the clan's residence in Mita, Edo while attempting to sort out the transfer at the age of 35 without having ever set foot in Sabae.

=== Manabe Akimichi ===
Manabe Akimichi (間部詮方; February 15, 1709 – September 23, 1785) was the 2nd daimyō of Sabae Domain and 3rd hereditary chieftain of the Manabe clan. His courtesy title was Wakasa-no-kami, later Tango-no-kami and his court rank was Junior Fifth Rank, Lower Grade. Born in Edo, he was the nephew of Manabe Akitoki and was adopted as heir in 1724, becoming daimyō on his uncle's death a few months later. He was received in formal audience by Shōgun Tokugawa Yoshimune the same year. In 1729, he visited Sabae for the first time, although due to his youth, domain matters were handled by his elder relatives. In Sabae, he managed to complete the jin'ya and make a start on the creation of a jōkamachi; however, these expenses together with the costs of sankin kotai, crop failures, protests by his villages against high taxation all quickly led the domain into a dire financial situation. This was coupled with a demand from the shogunate in 1743 that he render assistance with flood control projects in Edo. Furthermore, the newly built Sabae town burned down in 1755. In 1761, he retired in favour of his son, and spent the rest of his days at the clan's residence in Shinagawa.

=== Manabe Akinaka ===
Manabe Akinaka (間部詮央; December 12, 1738 - July 11, 1771) was the 3rd daimyō of Sabae Domain and 4th hereditary chieftain of the Manabe clan. His courtesy title was Shuzen-no-kami, and his Court rank was Junior Fifth Rank, Lower Grade. He was the second son of Manabe Akimichi. he was received in formal audience by Shōgun Tokugawa Ieshige in 1755, and became daimyō on his father's retirement in 1761. He visited the domain for the first time in 1763. He inherited a host of financial problems from his father, which only grew larger with a fire which destroyed the domain's Edo residence and repeated crop failures in Sabae. He died at the age of 34 in 1771. His wife was a daughter of Kutsuki Totsuna of Fukuchiyama Domain, but he no children and was succeeded by his younger brother.

=== Manabe Akitō ===
Manabe Akitō (間部詮茂; June 21, 1739 - July 2, 1786) was the 4th daimyō of Sabae Domain and 5th hereditary chieftain of the Manabe clan. His courtesy title was Shimōsa-no-kami, and his Court rank was Junior Fifth Rank, Lower Grade. He was the third son of Manabe Akimichi and was posthumously adopted on Manabe Akinaka's death without heir in 1771. He was received in formal audience by Shōgun Tokugawa Ieharu in 1772 and visited Sabae in 1773. Although he took personal interest in attempts to reform the domain, the Great Tenmei famine resulted in 7597 deaths, and he depleted the clan's resources in an effort to help the surviving populace. He died in 1786 at the age of 47. His wife was a daughter of Hotta Masasuke of Sakura Domain.

=== Manabe Akihiro ===
Manabe Akihiro (間部詮熙; July 12, 1770 - February 3, 1812) was the 5th daimyō of Sabae Domain and 6th hereditary chieftain of the Manabe clan. His courtesy title was Shuzen-no-kami, later Wakasa-no-kami, and his Court rank was Junior Fifth Rank, Lower Grade. He was the eldest son of Manabe Akitoa by a concubine. In 1785 he was received in formal audience by Shōgun Tokugawa Ieharu. He became daimyō on his father's death in 1786. He passed numerous laws on fiscal restraint in an attempt to improve the domain's finances to little avail, and turned to Confucianism, inviting noted scholars from Kyoto and establishing a han school and commissioning a history of the domain. He died of illness at the age of 42 in 1812.

=== Manabe Akisane ===
Manabe Akisane (間部詮允; February 19, 1790 - August 31, 1814) was the 6th daimyō of Sabae Domain and 7th hereditary chieftain of the Manabe clan. His courtesy title was Mondo-no-shō, and his Court rank was Junior Fifth Rank, Lower Grade. He was the eldest son of Manabe Akihiro and was born in Sabae. He became daimyō on his father's death in 1812. He was assigned to serve on the guard of Sakurada Gate at Edo Castle. In Sabae, he rebuilt the han school and reformed family inheritance laws, but he died in 1814 at the age of 25 before he could make much impact on the domain. His wife was a daughter of Kamei Norikata of Tsuwano Domain, but he died without heir.

=== Manabe Akikatsu ===
Manabe Akikatsu (間部詮勝; 30 March 1804 – 28 November 1884) was the 7th daimyō of Sabae Domain and 8th hereditary chieftain of the Manabe clan. His courtesy title was Shimōsa-no-kami, and his Court rank was Junior Fifth Rank, Lower Grade, later raised to Junior Fourth Rank, Lower Grade. He was the fifth son of Manabe Akihiro, became daimyō on his uncle's death in 1814. Under Shōgun Tokugawa Ieharu he served in a variety of positions in the Tokugawa shogunate, including Sōshaban, Jisha-bugyō, Osaka-jō dai, Kyoto Shoshidai and rōjū. In 1858, Ii Naosuke was appointed Tairō, and Manabe was seen as his right-hand man, taking a leading role in the ratification of the Harris Treaty opening Japan to the Western powers. This drew the wrath of the Sonnō jōi samurai, and Yoshida Shōin in particular pushed strongly for Manabe's assassination. After the assassination of IInaosuke and accession of Shōgun Tokugawa Yoshinobu, Akikatsu quickly fell from favour. He was dismissed as rōjū and told to retire in 1862, and Sabae Domain was reduced in kokudaka by 10,000 koku. He remained under house arrest to 1865. He was placed under house arrest again by the new Meiji government for suspicion of collaboration with Aizu Domain from 1868 to 1869. He died in 1884. His wife was a daughter of Matsudaira Yasutō of Hamada Domain.

=== Manabe Akizane ===
Manabe Akizane (間部詮実; May 23, 1827 - January 6, 1864) was the 8th daimyō of Sabae Domain and 9th hereditary chieftain of the Manabe clan. His courtesy title was Awa-no-kami, and his Court rank was Junior Fifth Rank, Lower Grade. He was born in Edo the second son of Manabe Akikatsu, and was received in formal audience by Shōgun Tokugawa Ieyoshi in 1841. He became daimyō on his father's forced retirement in 1862. Although not connected with the domain government at the time, he was placed under house arrest until 1863, but died only a year later without heir. Akizane was a noted scholar and poet, and left behind 81 volumes of essays under various topics. His wife was a daughter of Itō Suketomo of Obi Domain.

=== Manabe Akimichi II ===
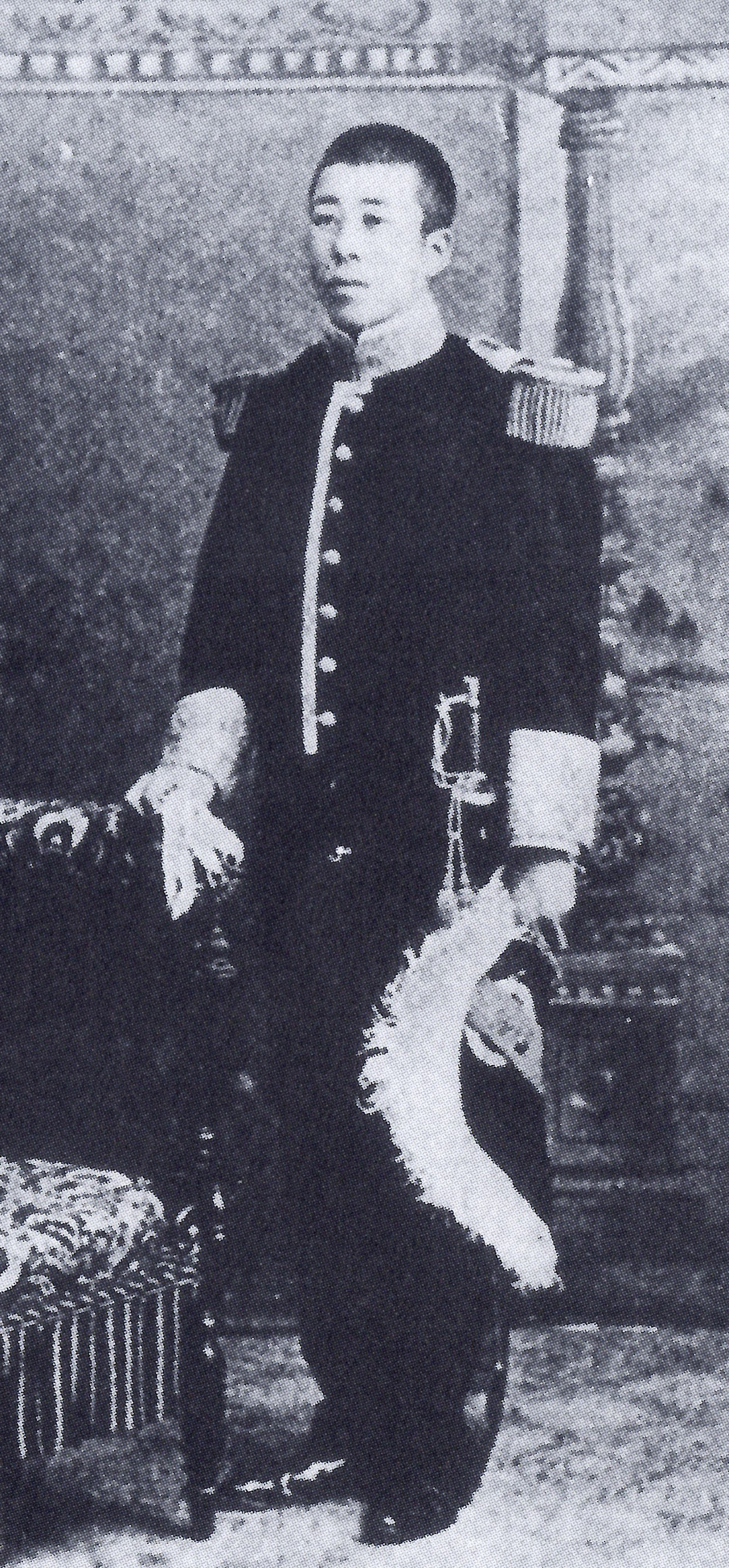
Manabe Akimichi

Manabe Akimichi (間部詮道; October 8, 1853 - April 6, 1892) was the 9th (and final) daimyō of Sabae Domain and 10th hereditary chieftain of the Akita clan. His courtesy title was Shimōsa-no-shō, and his Court rank was Junior Fourth Rank, Lower Grade. He was born in Edo as the eighth son of Manabe Akikatsu, and was posthumously adopted as heir and made daimyō on the death of Manabe Akizane. He was received in formal audience by Shōgun Tokugawa Ieshige in 1865, and underwent his genpuku ceremony in 1867. As Sabae Domain quickly sided with the pro-imperial side in the Boshin War, he served as imperial governor of Sabae under the Meiji government until the abolition of the han system in 1871. He later moved to Tokyo, where he lived to his retirement in 1882. In 1884, his son received the kazoku peerage title of viscount (shishaku). He died in 1892 at the age of 40. His grave is at the temple of Kuhon-ji in Taitō, Tokyo.
