= Masatoshi Ōkōchi =

Japanese physicist and business executive

- 大河内 正敏
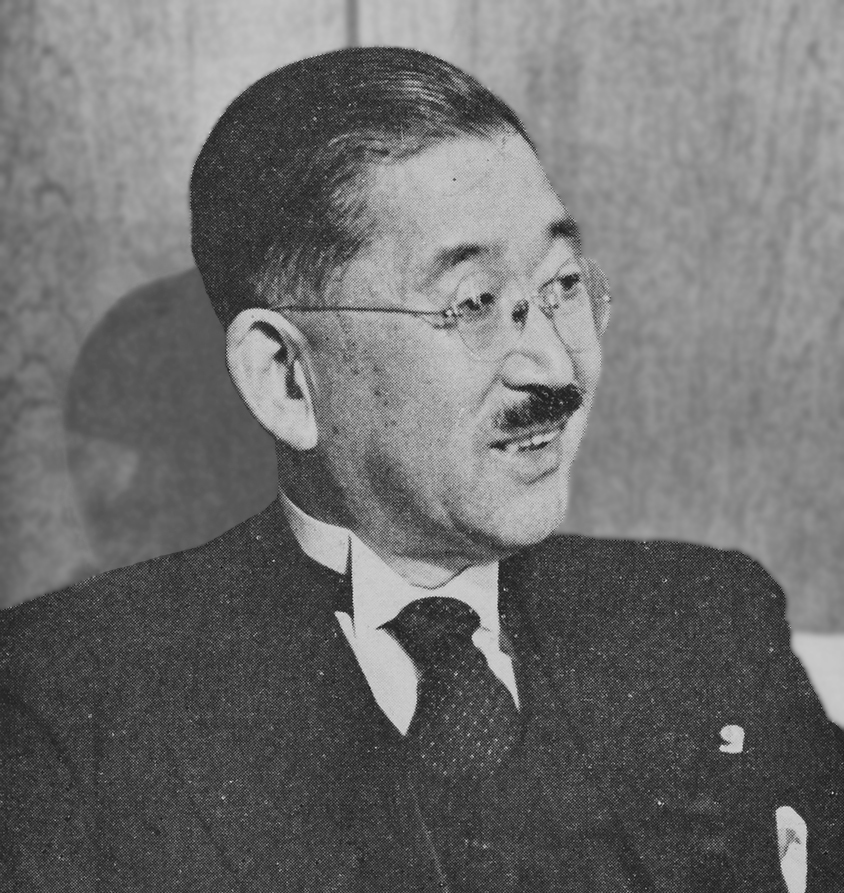
- Born: December 6, 1878; Minato, Tokyo, Japan
- Died: August 29, 1952 (aged 73)
- Occupation: Businessman
- Children: 5 (including Nobutake and Nobuhiro)

Viscount Masatoshi Ōkōchi (大河内正敏, Ōkōchi Masatoshi; December 6, 1878 – August 29, 1952) was a Japanese physicist and business executive. He was the third director of the Riken Institute, a position which he assumed in 1921 and held for 25 years. During this period, he was notable for establishing the Riken Konzern, a zaibatsu of companies which focused on utilizing Riken's research results to produce commercial products.

== Personal life ==
He was the eldest son of Ōkōchi Masatada, son of Manabe Akikatsu and adopted son of Matsudaira Masatomo. He married a daughter of his uncle Ōkōchi Nobuhisa, another son of Akikatsu but adopted by Matsudaira Nobuaki, with whom he had issue, including Nobuhiro Ōkōchi. His granddaughter through Nobuhiro was actress Momoko Kōchi.

=== Ancestry ===
Ancestors of Masatoshi Ōkōchi

16. Manabe Akitō
8. Manabe Akihiro
4. Manabe Akikatsu
2. Ōkōchi Masatada
20. Matsudaira Yasumichi
10. Matsudaira Yasutō
5. Matsudaira Renko
22. Matsudaira Yasusada
11. Mankihime
1. Masatoshi Ōkōchi
24. Matsudaira Masamichi
12. Matsudaira Masakata
6. Matsudaira Masatomo
26. Matsudaira Nobuakira
13. Matsudaira Atsu
3. Matsudaira Mineko

== History ==
Masatoshi was born in Hamamatsuchō, Minato, Tokyo as a descendant of the Ōkōchi-Matsudaira clan who ruled over the Ōtaki Domain. After graduating from an elementary school affiliated with Gakushūin, he received an education at the First High School, and then enrolled in the Tokyo Imperial University.

- 1903 – After graduating from college, he became a lecturer. His subsequent visits to Europe were privately financed.
- 1911 – After returning to Japan, he was appointed professor at the Tokyo Imperial University.
  During that time, he collaborated with Torahiko Terada on the experiment involving flying bullets.
- 1914 – He received a Doctor of Engineering.
- February 27, 1915 – He was elected as Viscount in the House of Peers.
- 1918 – He served as parliamentary vice-minister of the Ministry of the Navy of Japan under Hara Takashi.
- September 30, 1921 – Under the recommendation of the president of the University of Tokyo, Yamakawa Kenjirō, he was elevated to his position as director of Riken.
  There, he introduced the laboratory system to bring freedom to senior researchers at Riken, further advancing the commercialization of research results, making Riken an international research institute.
- 1925 – He resigned his position as professor at the University of Tokyo to devote to his position as director of Riken.
- 1927 – For the purpose of commercializing research results on Kogyo Co, Ltd., Riken started production of the first practical use piston ring in Japan.
  Seventy-six companies merged into the Riken Konzern, causing Riken to account for the leadership of this zaibatsu.
- April 1, 1930 – He was ordained into the Japanese honors system, and he was bestowed upon the Order of the Sacred Treasure.
- July 19, 1930 – He resigned as a member of the House of Peers.
- April 2, 1934 – He was appointed as the fourth head of Tokyo's physical school (now superseded by the Tokyo University of Science).
- May 1936 – He was appointed as president of Tokyo's physical school.
- September 1937 – He resigned as president of Tokyo's physical school.
- February 10, 1938 – He was elected as Viscount in the House of Peers in a representative election.
- 1943 – He was appointed as an adviser of Tojo's cabinet.
- December 6, 1945 – He was charged for war crimes as a Class A war criminal suspect.
- December 13, 1945 – He was detained in Sugamo Prison.
- December 25, 1945 – He resigned as principal of Tokyo's physical school.
- April 1946 – He was released from custody.
- April 7, 1946 – He resigned as a member of the House of Peers for the last time.
- October 1946 – He resigned as the director of Riken.
  Until his resignation, he supported the researchers' studies in a wide range of fields in the royalties of Riken's companies.
  Also, one year after the resignation, he was purged from running for public office.
- August 6, 1951 – His purge from office has been softened.
- August 29, 1952 – He died from a cerebral infarction at the age of 73. Before his death, he was bestowed upon the Order of the Rising Sun.
  His grave is located at Heirin-ji at Niiza, Saitama.

== See also ==
- Ricoh
- Riken
- Ten Japanese Great Inventors
