= Matsudaira Norihiro =

Japanese daimyō

Matsudaira Norihiro (松平 乗寛, January 25, 1778 – December 16, 1839) was a Japanese daimyō of the mid to late Edo period, who ruled the Nishio Domain. Norihiro held a variety of positions in the Tokugawa shogunate, including rōjū and Kyoto Shoshidai.

He was the father of Makino Tadayuki, another holder of the Kyoto Shoshidai office.

Preceded by Matsudaira Norisada	(Matsudaira/Ogyū) Daimyō of Nishio; 1793–1839	Succeeded by Matsudaira Noriyasu
Preceded by Ōkubo Tadazane	38th Kyoto Shoshidai; 1818–1823	Succeeded by Naitō Nobuatsu
