= Kawagoe Clan =

History of a significant Japanese samurai clan

Kawagoe clan (川越氏, Kawagoe-shi) was a Japanese samurai family of the Kamakura period and Muromachi period, based in what is now Kawagoe, Saitama. The clan was a branch of the influential Chichibu clan and traced its lineage to the Taira clan.

== History ==
The Kawagoe clan emerged in the late Heian period, rising to prominence during the early Kamakura shogunate. They served as local retainers under the powerful Minamoto clan and played a role in military and administrative functions in the Musashi Province. Some clan members held the title of jitō (land steward) and were tasked with managing estates on behalf of the shogunate.

During the Kamakura period, Kawagoe Shigeyori (川越重頼) was a noted figure in the clan’s history and is said to have had familial ties to important political marriages. Shigeyori’s wife served as wet-nurse to Minamoto Yoritomo’s son, and their daughter was married to Yoritomo’s younger brother, Minamoto no Yoshitsune, who was one of the most significant Samurai generals in Japanese history. After the falling-out between Yoritomo and Yoshitsune, Yoritomo had Shigeyori executed and confiscated his lands. The Kawagoe family line effectively ended with Shigeyori’s third son, Shigekazu.

By the Sengoku period, the power of the Kawagoe clan had diminished, and the region eventually fell under the control of more powerful warlords such as the Later Hōjō clan. The clan’s legacy remains tied to the city of Kawagoe, which retains historical landmarks and temples associated with the family. Some of their burial sites and fortified remains can still be seen in the region. The family's story is a classic example of the rise and fall of a provincial warrior house during Japan's medieval period.

== See also ==
- Chichibu clan
- Kawagoe, Saitama
- Minamoto no Yoritomo
- Minamoto no Yoshitsune
