= Manabe Akifusa =

Japanese daimyo (1666–1720)

Manabe Akifusa 間部 詮房
- Born: June 18, 1666
- Died: August 7, 1720 (aged 54); Murakami, Niigata, Japan
- Father: Nishida Kiyosada

Daimyō of Takasaki Domain
- In office 1710–1717

Daimyō of Murakami Domain
- In office 1717–1720

Manabe Akifusa (間部 詮房; June 18, 1666 – August 7, 1720) was a close personal confidant and lover of Shōgun Tokugawa Ienobu and held numerous important posts within the administration of the Tokugawa shogunate. He was also daimyō of Takasaki Domain and later of Murakami Domain.

Akifusa was the son of Nishida Kiyosada, a retainer of Tokugawa Tsunashige, the daimyō of Kofu Domain. He was initially apprenticed to a sarugaku theatre troupe, but in 1684 became a page to Tokugawa Tsunatoyo. His family name was changed to "Manabe" around this time. He rose rapidly through the ranks due to his special relationship with Tsunashige, and by 1704 was counted as a member of his inner entourage, had been awarded with the courtesy title of Echizen-no-kami, and the court rank of Junior Fifth Rank, Lower Grade. In 1705 his income was increased to 3,000 koku, but in 1706 he was named a deputy wakadoshiyori and granted additional estates in Sagami Province which brought his income to over the 10,000 koku mark required to become a daimyō. The same year, his court rank was increased to Junior Fifth Rank, Lower Grade, and he was nominated deputy rōjū. In 1710, his income was increased to 50,000 koku and he became daimyō of Takasaki Domain. This rise in status of a person who was originally a member of the despised profession of "entertainer" to a daimyō and senior official in the government was unprecedented and was largely due to the backing of Shōgun Tokugawa Ienobu and his successor Tokugawa Ietsugu.

Akifusa was noted for his backing of the Confucianist scholar-bureaucrat Arai Hakuseki as a "brain" for the Tokugawa shogunate and his economic and political reform program. Especially under the tenure of the young Tokugawa Ietsugu, Akifuse wielded tremendous influence as a sobayōnin. After Ietsugu died and was replaced by Tokugawa Yoshimune, Akifusa's influence went into rapid decline. He was relieved of all offices within the shogunate, and was transferred from Takasaki to the more remote Murakami Domain on the Sea of Japan in 1717. He died in Murakami in 1720 at the age of 54. As he had no male heir, he adopted his younger brother, Manabe Akitoki as heir. His grave is at the temple of Jōnen-ji in Murakami.

Shortly after Akifusa's death, Manabe Akitoki was transferred to the newly created Sabae Domain, where his descendants lived until the Meiji restoration.

Preceded by Matsudaira Terusada	1st Manabe Daimyō of Takasaki; 1710-1717	Succeeded by Matsudaira Terusada
Preceded by Matsudaira Terusada	1st Manabe Daimyō of Murakami; 1717-1720	Succeeded by Manabe Akitoki
