= Manabe Akikatsu =

Japanese daimyō

Manabe Akikatsu 間部 詮勝
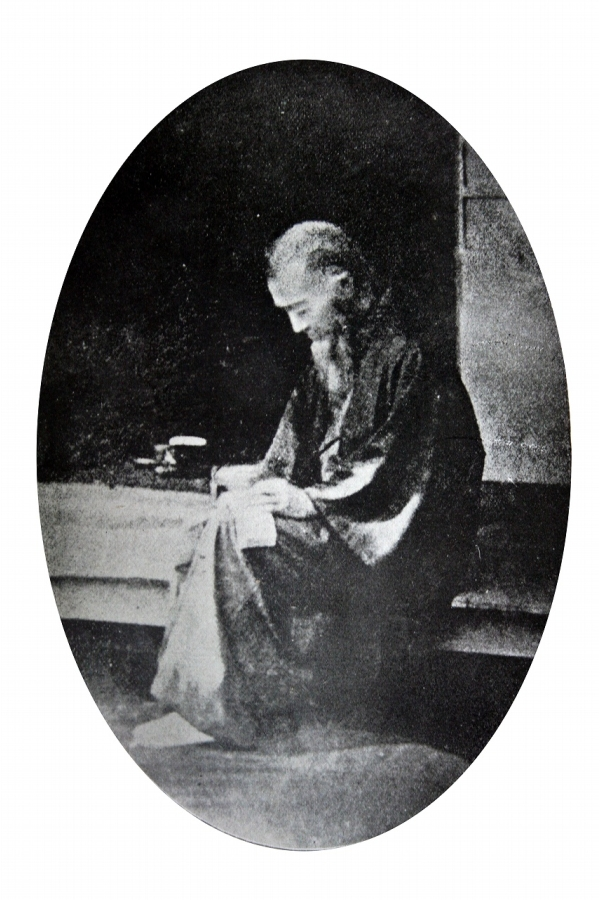
- Born: 30 March 1804; Edo, Japan
- Died: 28 November 1884 (aged 80)
- Father: Manabe Akihiro

Daimyō of Sabae Domain
- In office 1814–1862

Kyoto Shoshidai
- In office 1838–1840

Manabe Akikatsu (間部 詮勝; 30 March 1804 – 28 November 1884) was the 7th daimyō of Sabae Domain in Echizen Province under the Tokugawa shogunate of Edo period Japan. His courtesy title was Shimōsa-no-kami, and his Court rank was Junior Fifth Rank, Lower Grade, later raised to Junior Fourth Rank, Lower Grade. He was the 8th hereditary chieftain of the Manabe clan.

== Biography ==
Akikatsu was born at the Sabae Domain's Edo residence as the fifth son of Manabe Akihiro. He became daimyō on the death of his uncle Manabe Akisane in 1814. Under Shōgun Tokugawa Ieharu he served in a variety of positions in the Tokugawa shogunate, including Sōshaban, Jisha-bugyō, Osaka-jō dai, Kyoto Shoshidai and became rōjū in 1840. However, due to political disagreements with Mizuno Tadakuni, he was forced from office in 1843.

In 1858, he was restored to the post of rōjū by the Tairō Ii Naosuke, and quickly was seen as Ii's right-hand man, taking a leading role in difficult situations, such as the Ansei Purge, the ratification of the Ansei Treaties, and the opposition to Hitotsubashi Yoshinobu from becoming shōgun. In particular, his heavy-handed approach to forcing Emperor Kōmei to accept the ratification of the Harris Treaty and his suppression of pro-Sonnō jōi samurai in Kyoto drew the wrath of Yoshida Shōin in particular, who made many inflammatory speeches and writings urging Manabe's assassination.

After the assassination of Ii Naosuke and accession of Hitotsubashi Yoshinobu as Shōgun Tokugawa Yoshinobu, Akikatsu quickly fell from favour. He was dismissed as rōjū and forced to retire as daimyō in 1862. Furthermore, Sabae Domain was reduced in kokudaka by 10,000 koku. Akikatsu remained under house arrest to 1865. He was placed under house arrest again by the new Meiji government for suspicion of collaboration with Aizu Domain from 1868 to 1869.

He died in 1884 and his grave is at the temple of Hokekyō-ji in Ichikawa, Chiba.

== Family ==
His wife was a daughter of Matsudaira Yasutō of Hamada Domain, and his son and heir was Manabe Akizane. He had several other children, including Ōkōchi Nobuhisa (daimyō of Yoshida Domain), Ōkōchi Masatada (daimyō of Ōtaki Domain), and Manabe Akimichi, the final daimyō of Sabae Domain. Masatoshi Ōkōchi, the third president of RIKEN, was the son of Ōkōchi Masatada.

Preceded by Manabe Akisane	Daimyō of Sabae; 1814–1862	Succeeded by Manabe Akizane
Preceded by Doi Toshitsura	46th Kyoto Shoshidai; 1838–1840	Succeeded by Makino Tadamasa
