= Mizuno Tadaaki =

Japanese daimyō

Mizuno Tadaaki (水野 忠光, September 28, 1771 – May 23, 1814) was a Japanese daimyō of the Edo period, who ruled the Karatsu Domain. He was the eldest son of the previous daimyō, Mizuno Tadakane; after Tadakane's retirement in 1805, he received headship and the title of daimyō. Tadaaki dismissed Nihonmatsu Yoshikado; the karō whom his father had relied on. Instead, he conducted direct government, and tried to institute reforms. However, his reforms were largely unsuccessful, and so he yielded headship to his son, the reformer Mizuno Tadakuni, and retired.

Preceded by Mizuno Tadakane	3rd Daimyō of Karatsu (Mizuno); 1805–1812	Succeeded by Mizuno Tadakuni
