= Naitō Nobuchika =

Japanese daimyō

Daimyō of Murakami
- In office 1825–1864
- Preceded by: Naitō Nobuatsu
- Succeeded by: Naitō Nobutami

Personal details
- Born: January 24, 1813
- Died: May 14, 1874 (aged 61) Tokyo, Japan

Naitō Nobuchika (内藤 信親; January 24, 1813 – May 14, 1874), was the 7th Naitō daimyō of Murakami Domain under the Edo period Tokugawa shogunate of Japan. He was also known as Naitō Nobumoto (内藤信思). His courtesy title was Kii-no-kami.

Nobuchika was the third son of Naitō Nobuatsu, the previous daimyō. He became heir in 1822 on the death of his elder brother, and became daimyō in 1825 on the death of his father. In the year 1843 he was appointed Jisha-bugyō and in 1849 became Osaka-jō dai. In 1850, he was appointed Kyoto Shoshidai and rose to the post of rōjū 1851, holding that post until 1862 During his tenure as rōjū he was influential in the Bunsei reforms and the Kōbu gattai movement to strengthen the shogunate through union with the Imperial family of Japan. His wife was a daughter of Matsudaira Sadanobu of Shirakawa Domain, author of the Kansei Reforms. He retired in 1864, turning the domain over to his adopted son, Naitō Nobutami, but continued to influence politics to the extent that the domain became a member of the Ōuetsu Reppan Dōmei during the Boshin War and fought in the Battle of Hokuetsu against the Meiji government. He was arrested by the new government in 1868, but was pardoned in 1869 and died in Tokyo at the age of 63 in 1874.

== Notes ==
| Preceded by Naitō Nobuatsu | 7th daimyō of Murakami; 1825 -1864 | Succeeded by Naitō Nobutami |
| Preceded by Matsudaira Tadakata | 65th Osaka-jō dai 1848 - 1850 | Succeeded by Tsuchiya Tomonao |
| Preceded by Sakai Tadaaki | 49th Kyoto Shoshidai; 1850 -1851 | Succeeded by Wakisaka Yasuori |
