= Naitō Nobuatsu =

Japanese daimyō

Naitō Nobuatsu 南部信順
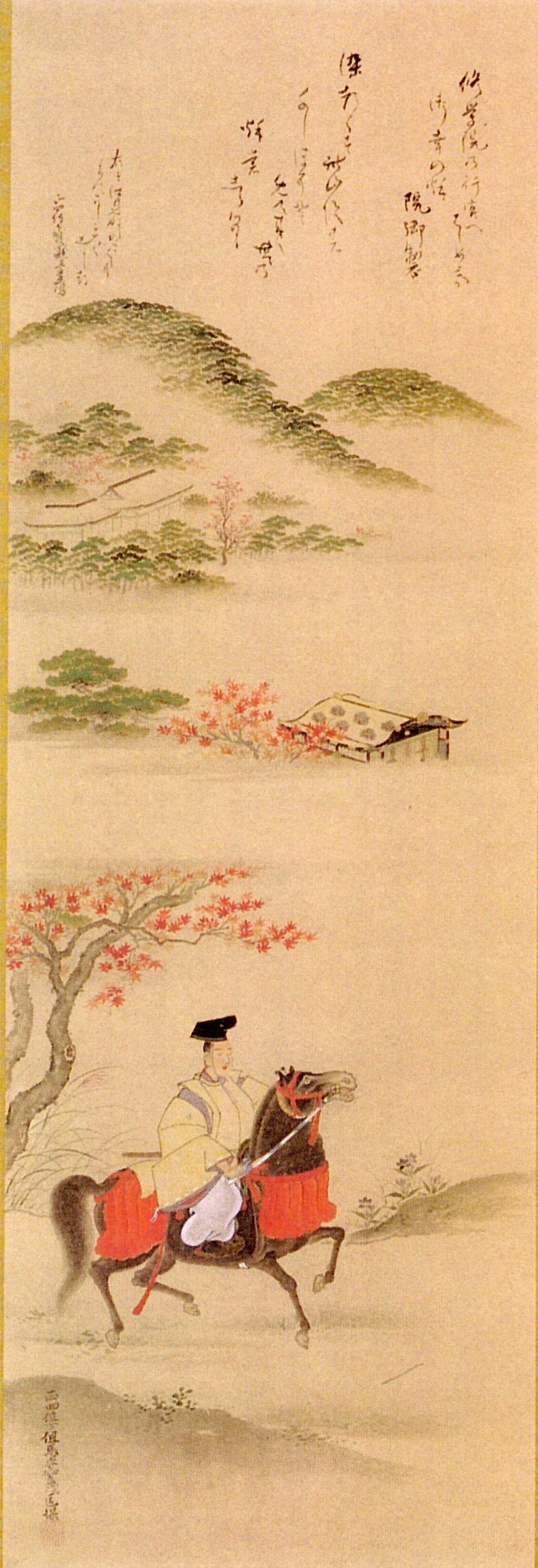
- Born: October 31, 1777
- Died: May 23, 1825 (aged 47)
- Occupation: Daimyō of Murakami Domain (1781-1825)
- Father: Naitō Nobuyori

Naitō Nobuatsu (内藤 信敦; October 31, 1777 – May 23, 1825) was the sixth Naitō daimyō of Murakami Domain under the Edo period Tokugawa shogunate of Japan. Nobuatsu was the eldest son of Naitō Nobuyori, the previous daimyō. He was born in Edo and became daimyō in 1781 on the death of his father. In the year 1800 he was appointed a sōshaban. He rose to the post of Jisha-bugyō in 1813. In 1817, he was appointed a wakadoshiyori, followed by Kyoto Shoshidai in 1823. His wife was a daughter of Yanagisawa Yasumitsu of Yamato-Kōriyama Domain. He later remarried to a daughter of Matsudaira Sadanobu of Shirakawa Domain. He died while in office in Kyoto in 1825.

Preceded by Naitō Nobuyori	7th daimyō of Murakami; 1781–1825	Succeeded by Naitō Nobuchika
Preceded by Matsudaira Norihiro	39th Kyoto Shoshidai; 1823–1825	Succeeded by Matsudaira Yasutō
