= Mizuno Tadakuni =

Japanese daimyō (1794–1851)

- 水野 忠邦
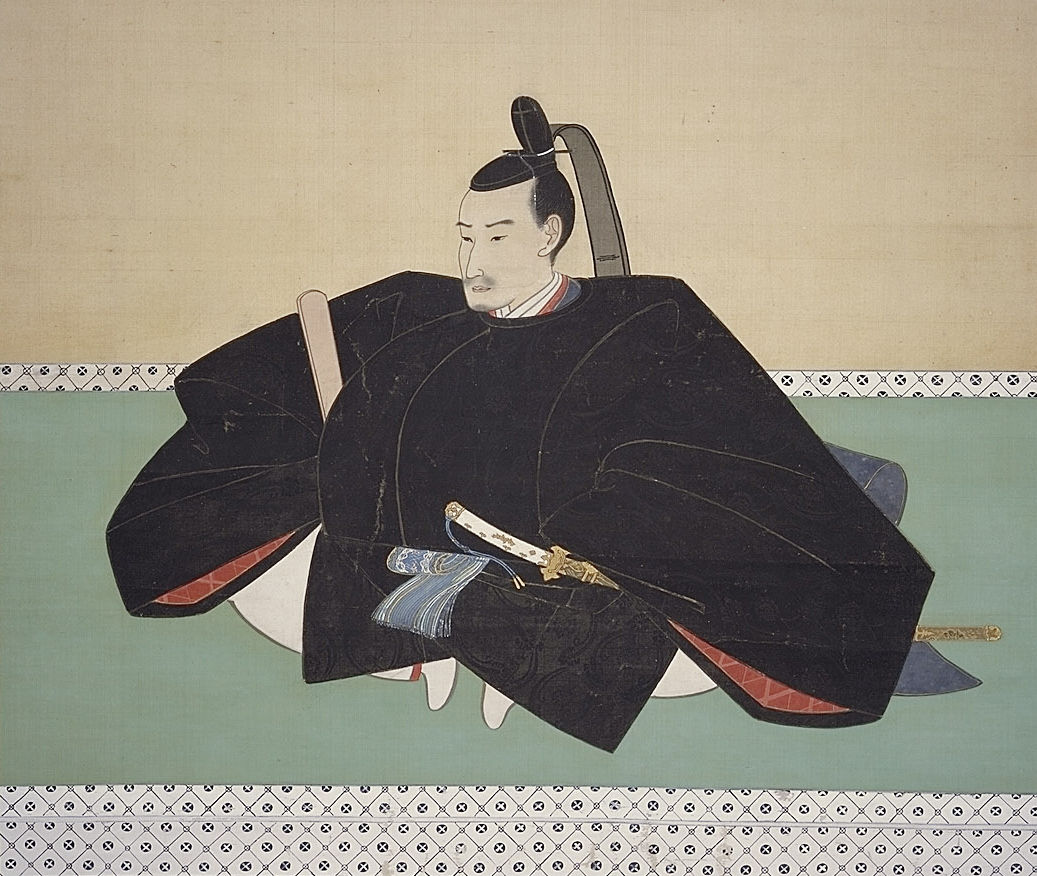

Personal details
- Born: July 19, 1794
- Died: March 12, 1851 (aged 56) Yamagata, Japan
- Occupation: Daimyō; Rōjū

Mizuno Tadakuni (水野 忠邦; July 19, 1794 – March 12, 1851) was a daimyō during late-Edo period Japan, who later served as chief senior councilor (Rōjū) in service to the Tokugawa shogunate. He is remembered for having instituted the Tenpō Reforms.

== Biography ==
Mizuno Tadakuni was the second son of Mizuno Tadaaki, the daimyō of Karatsu Domain. As his elder brother died at an early age, Tadakuni became heir in 1805 and was presented to shōgun Tokugawa Ienari and future shōgun Tokugawa Ieyoshi in a formal audience in 1807. In 1812, on the retirement of his father, he became head of the Mizuno clan and daimyō of Karatsu. He entered the service of the Tokugawa shogunate as a Sōshaban (Master of Ceremonies) at Edo Castle in 1816. However, faced with increasing difficulties over the policing of the foreign trade port of Nagasaki, in 1817, Tadakuni petitioned to be transferred from the Karatsu Domain to the much smaller Hamamatsu Domain in Tōtōmi Province. Although both domains were ranked officially at 70,000 koku, Karatsu Domain had an effective income of 253,000 koku as opposed to only 153,000 koku for Hamamatsu. As a consequence, this transfer was met with outrage and disbelief by his senior retainers, resulting in the seppuku of his senior advisor, but Tadakuni would not be dissuaded. The same year, within the shogunal administration, he received the post of Jisha-bugyō (Commissioner of Shrine and Temples).

In 1825, Tadakuni received the post of Osaka-jō dai (Castellan of Osaka), with a promotion to Lower 4th Court Rank. The following year (1826), he became Kyoto Shoshidai, the shogunate's official representative to the Court in Kyoto. His courtesy title was changed from Izumi-no-kami to Echizen-no-kami. In 1828, Tadakuni became a Rōju. He steadily rose through the ranks of the Rōjū to become Senior Rōjū in 1839.

As Rōjū Mizuno Tadakuni wielded tremendous political power, and attempted to overhaul the shogunate's finances and social controls in the aftermath of the Great Tempo Famine of 1832–36 by the passage of numerous sumptuary laws which came to be known as the Tenpō Reforms. The reforms tried to stabilize the economy through a return to the frugality, simplicity and discipline that were characteristic from the early Edo period by banning most forms of entertainment and displays of wealth. This proved extremely unpopular with the commoners. Another part of the Reform included the Agechi-rei which was to have daimyō in the vicinity of Edo and Ōsaka surrender their holdings for equal amounts of land elsewhere, thereby consolidating Tokugawa control over these strategically vital areas. However, this was also greatly unpopular amongst daimyō of all ranks and income levels. The general failure of the reforms caused Tadakuni to lose favor, and opinion of him declined further when Edo Castle burned down in May 1844. On February 22, 1845, he was relieved of his position in the government, and on September 2, 1845, he was exiled to Yamagata Domain in Dewa Province, where he remained in exile until his death. He died on March 12, 1851, five days before word of his release from exile would have reached him. He was succeeded by his son Mizuno Tadakiyo, who was also an important figure in the late Tokugawa shogunate.

Mizuno Tadakuni was married to a daughter of Sakai Tadayuki, a wakadoshiyori and daimyō of Obama Domain.

== Depiction in popular culture ==
Mizuno is a recurring, sometimes major, character in the Nemuri Kyōshirō films, TV series and TV specials, where he is Chief Elder of the Rōjū.

== Notes ==
| Preceded by Mizuno Tadaaki | 4th Daimyō of Karatsu (Mizuno); 1812–1817 | Succeeded by Ogasawara Nagamasa |
| Preceded by Inoue Masamoto | 1st Daimyō of Hamamatsu (Mizuno); 1817–1845 | Succeeded by Mizuno Tadakiyo |
| Preceded by Matsudaira Yasutō | 54th Castellan of Osaka; 1825–1826 | Succeeded by Matsudaira Muneakira |
| Preceded by Matsudaira Yasutō | 41st Kyoto Shoshidai; 1826–1828 | Succeeded by Matsudaira Muneakira |
