= Takasaki Domain =

Feudal domain in Edo period Japan

Takasaki Domain 高崎藩
- under Tokugawa shogunate Japan
- 1590–1871
- Capital: Takasaki Castle
- Government
  - Type: Daimyō
- Historical era: Edo period
  - Established: 1590
  - Disestablished: 1871
- Today part of: part of Gunma Prefecture

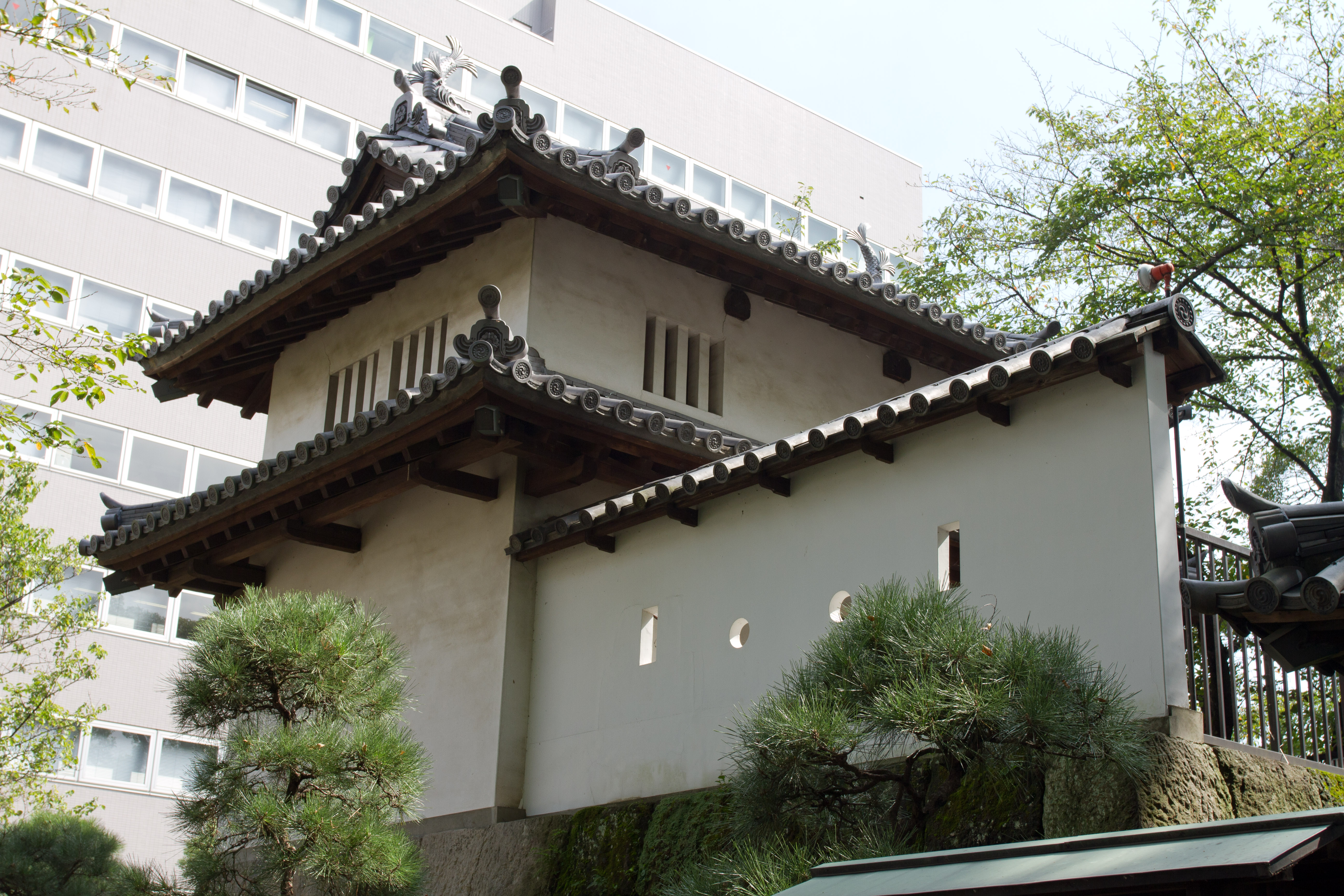
Surviving yagura of Takasaki Castle, headquarters of Takasaki Domain

Takasaki Domain (高崎藩, Takasaki -han) was a feudal domain under the Tokugawa shogunate of Edo period Japan, located in Kōzuke Province (modern-day Gunma Prefecture), Japan. It was centered on Takasaki Castle in what is now part of the city of Takasaki, Gunma. Takasaki was ruled through most of its history by a junior branch of the Matsudaira clan.

== History ==
During the late Heian period, the area around what is now Takasaki was controlled by the Wada clan. During the Muromachi period, the Wada came under the service of the Uesugi clan, who held the post of Kantō kanrei; however in 1561, Wada Narishige, incensed over the appointment of Uesugi Kenshin to the post, defected to the Takeda. His son, Wada Nobunari, in turn came into the service of the Odawara Hōjō. During the Battle of Odawara in 1590, Toyotomi Hideyoshi dispatched an army led by Uesugi Kagekatsu and Maeda Toshiie and destroyed Wada Castle.

After Tokugawa Ieyasu took control over the Kantō region in 1590, he assigned Ii Naomasa, one of his most trusted Four Generals to nearby Minowa Castle, with revenues of 120,000 koku. However, in 1597, Ieyasu ordered Ii Naomasa to construct a new castle on the site of the ruins of Wada Castle, as the location controlled a strategic junction connecting the Nakasendō with the Mikuni Kaidō highways. Ii Naomasu relocated to the site in 1598, renaming it Takasaki, and bringing with him the population of Minowa to form the nucleus of a new castle town. This marked the beginning of Takasaki Domain.

Ii Naomasa was transferred to Hikone Domain, and Takasaki given to Sakai Ietsugu in 1604 with its revenues reduced to 50,000 koku. The domain then passed through two branches of the Matsudaira clan before it was awarded to Ando Shigenobu in 1619. The Andō clan ruled over three generations to 1695. Matsudaira Terusada of the Ōkōchi branch of the Matsudaira clan became daimyō in 1695. He also served in a number of important offices under Shōgun Tokugawa Tsunayoshi and Tokugawa Ienobu, and the domain was raised to 75,000 koku. He was replaced at Takasaki by Manabe Akifusa, another favorite of Tokugawa Ienobu in 1710, but returned to Takasaki in 1716, and his descendants continued to rule Takasaki until the end of the Edo period.

During the Bakumatsu period, forces of Takasaki Domain played a role in the suppression of the Tengutō Rebellion and the final daimyō, Matsudaira Teruna was ordered by the shogunate to defend Kōfu Castle during the Boshin War.

After the end of the conflict, with the abolition of the han system in July 1871, Takasaki Domain became "Takasaki Prefecture", which later became part of Gunma Prefecture.

The domain had a population of 3654 samurai in 916 households per a census in 1870.

== Holdings at the end of the Edo period ==
As with most domains in the han system, Takasaki Domain consisted of several discontinuous territories calculated to provide the assigned kokudaka, based on periodic cadastral surveys and projected agricultural yields.

- Kōzuke Province
  - 74 villages in Gunma District
  - 9 villages in Usui District
  - 2 villages in Midono District
  - 3 villages in Kataoka District
  - 1 village in Nawa District
- Echigo Province
  - 45 villages in Kanbara District
- Musashi Province
  - 5 villages in Niikura District
- Shimōsa Province
  - 18 villages in Kaijō District

== List of daimyō ==
#	Name	Tenure	Courtesy title	Court Rank	kokudaka
Ii clan (Fudai) 1590–1600
1	Ii Naomasa (井伊直政)	1590–1600	Hyōbu-shōyu (兵部少輔)	Lower 4th (従四 位下)	120,000 koku
Sakai clan (fudai) 1600–1616
1	Sakai Ietsugu (酒井家次)	1600–1616	Saemon-no-jō (左衛門尉)	Lower 5th (従五位下)	50,000 koku
Toda-Matsudaira clan (fudai) 1616–1617
1	Matsudaira Ienaga (松平康長)	1616–1618	Tango-no-kami(丹後守)	Lower 4th (従四位下)	20,000 koku
Fujii-Matsudaira clan (fudai) 1617–1619
1	Matsudaira Nobuyoshi (松平信吉)	1617–1619	Awa-no-kami (安房守)	Lower 5th (従五位下)	50,000 koku
Andō clan (fudai) 1619–1695
1	Andō Shigenobu (安藤重信)	1619–1621	Tsushima-no-kami (対馬守)	Lower 5th (従五位下)	56,000 koku
2	Andō Shigenaga (安藤重長)	1621–1657	Sakyō-shin (右京進)	Lower 5th (従五位下)	56,000 koku
3	Andō Shigehiro (安藤重博)	1657–1695	Tsushima-no-kami (対馬守)	Lower 5th (従五位下)	56,000 koku
Ōkōchi-Matsudaira clan (fudai) 1695–1695
1	Matsudaira Terusada (松平 輝貞)	1695–1710	Ukon-e-no-shōgen (右近将監)；Jijū (侍従)	Lower 4th (従四位下)	52,000 ->72,000 koku
Manabe clan (fudai) 1710–1717
1	Manabe Akifusa (間部詮房)	1715–1717	Echizen-no-kami (越前守)	Lower 4th (従四位下)	10,000 koku
Ōkōchi-Matsudaira clan (fudai) 1717–1871
1	Matsudaira Terusada (松平輝貞)	1717–1745	Ukyō-no-daibu (右京大夫); Jijū (侍従)	Lower 4th (従四位下)	52,000 -> 72,000 koku
2	Matsudaira Terunori (松平輝規)	1745–1749	Ukyō-no-daibu (右京大夫)	Lower 4th (従四位下)	72,000 koku
3	Matsudaira Terutaka (松平輝高)	1749–1781	Ukyō-no-daibu (右京大夫)	Lower 4th (従四位下)	72,000 -> 82,000 koku
4	Matsudaira Teruyasu (松平輝和)	1781–1800	Mino-no-kami (美濃守)	Lower 4th (従四位下)	82,000 koku
5	Matsudaira Terunobu (松平輝延)	1800–1825	Ukyō-no-daibu (右京大夫); Jijū (侍従)	Lower 4th (従四位下)	82,000 koku
6	Matsudaira Teruyoshi (松平輝承)	1800–1839	Ukyō-no-suke (右京亮)	Lower 5th (従五位下)	82,000 koku
7	Matsudaira Teruakira (松平輝徳)	1839–1840	Ukyō-no-suke (右京亮)	Lower 5th (従五位下)	82,000 koku
8	Matsudaira Terumichi (松平輝充)	1840–1846	Ukyō-no-suke (右京亮)	Lower 5th (従五位下)	82,000 koku
9	Matsudaira Terutoshi (松平輝聡)	1847–1860	Ukyō-no-suke (右京亮)	Lower 5th (従五位下)	82,000 koku
10	Matsudaira Teruna (松平輝聲)	1860–1871	Ukyō-no-suke (右京亮)	Lower 5th (従五位下)	82,000 koku
