= Sakai Tadayo =

Japanese daimyo (1572–1636)

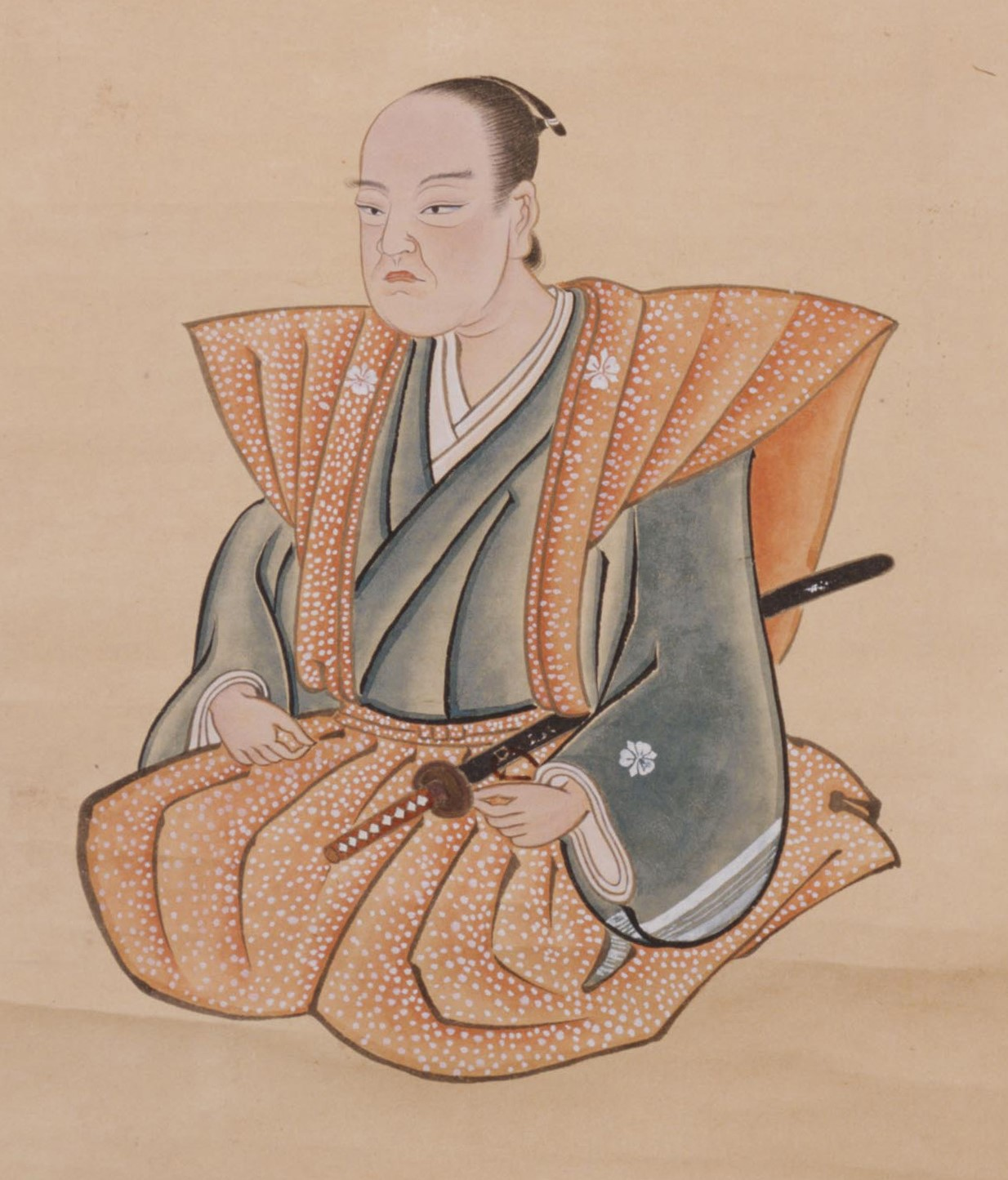
Sakai Tadayo

Sakai Tadayo (酒井 忠世; July 14, 1572 – April 24, 1636) was a Japanese daimyō of the Sengoku period, and high-ranking government advisor, holding the title of Rōjū, and later Tairō.

The son of Sakai Shigetada, Tadayo was born in Nishio, Mikawa Province; his childhood name was Manchiyo. He became a trusted elder (rōjū) in Toyotomi Hideyoshi's government, alongside Tokugawa Ieyasu. Under Hideyoshi, he was made lord of Kawagoe Castle (in Musashi Province, today Saitama Prefecture) and later of Nagoya Castle in Kyūshū's Hizen Province. In 1600, in the lead-up to the decisive Sekigahara campaign, he fought against the Tokugawa at Aizu, and submitted to them at the siege of Ueda. Thus, having joined the Tokugawa prior to the battle of Sekigahara itself, Sakai was made a fudai daimyō, and counted among the Tokugawa's more trusted retainers. He served under Ieyasu for a time, and under the second shōgun, Tokugawa Hidetada, as a hatamoto.

Sakai's father died in 1617, and so he inherited his father's domain of Maebashi in Harima Province, which had been assessed at 33,000 koku, and was now changed to 85,000 koku by the shogunate. In 1632, following a shakeup of positions within the bureaucracy, Sakai became nishi no maru rusui, placing him in charge of the western districts of Edo Castle, the seat of the shogunal government. Two years later, the Western districts were burnt down while the shōgun was away in Kyoto. Sakai was stripped of his position, and exiled to Kan'ei-ji.

Appealing to the Gosanke (the heads of the three branch families of the Tokugawa), Sakai was invited to return to the castle two years later, in 1636. Along with Doi Toshikatsu and Sakai Tadakatsu, he was appointed to the newly created post of Tairō (Great Elder). He died within weeks of being appointed, however, at the age of 64. His eldest son, Sakai Tadayuki, died around the same time, and so the next oldest son, Sakai Tadakiyo succeeded his father.
