= Chichibu clan =

Chichibu clan (秩父氏, Chichibu-shi) was a Japanese samurai clan that rose to prominence during the Heian period and played a supporting role in the establishment of the Kamakura shogunate in the late 12th century. The clan was based in the Chichibu region of Musashi Province (present-day Saitama Prefecture) and is regarded as a branch of the Taira clan, specifically the Kanmu Heishi lineage descended from Taira no Yoshifumi.

== Origins ==
The Chichibu clan descended from Taira no Yoshifumi (平良文), a 10th-century samurai believed to be a great-grandson of Emperor Kanmu. Yoshifumi is considered the progenitor of several Musashi-based warrior families, including the Chichibu. His descendants took the name "Chichibu" from their base in the mountainous area of western Musashi.

== Heian and Kamakura Periods ==
By the late Heian period, the Chichibu clan had established itself as a dominant regional power in Musashi. They were among the early samurai families who provided military support to the Minamoto clan in their rebellion against the Taira clan during the Genpei War (1180–1185). The Chichibu are recorded as being among the eastern warriors who supported Minamoto no Yoritomo, and their loyalty helped secure rewards during the formation of the Kamakura shogunate.

Some sources associate the Chichibu with early appointments as jitō (land stewards) and shugo (military governors) under the Kamakura regime, though the clan's prominence declined in later centuries.

== Branch Clans and Legacy ==
The Chichibu clan gave rise to several influential offshoots, including:

- The Kawagoe Clan, which played a role in Kamakura politics and intermarried with the Minamoto.
- The Edo clan, established by Chichibu descendant Edo Shigetsugu (江戸重継), who built a fortified residence that later became Edo Castle.
- The Oyamada clan and Hiki clan, both influential in the Kanto region during the Kamakura period.

The Chichibu name survives today in the city of Chichibu, Saitama, which retains historical and religious sites associated with the clan, including Chichibu Shrine.

== See also ==
- Taira clan
- Kamakura shogunate
- Musashi Province
- Chichibu, Saitama
- Kawagoe Clan
