= Hamada Domain =

Administrative division in western Japan during the Edo period (1619-1866)

Hamada Domain 浜田藩
- Domain of Japan
- 1619–1866
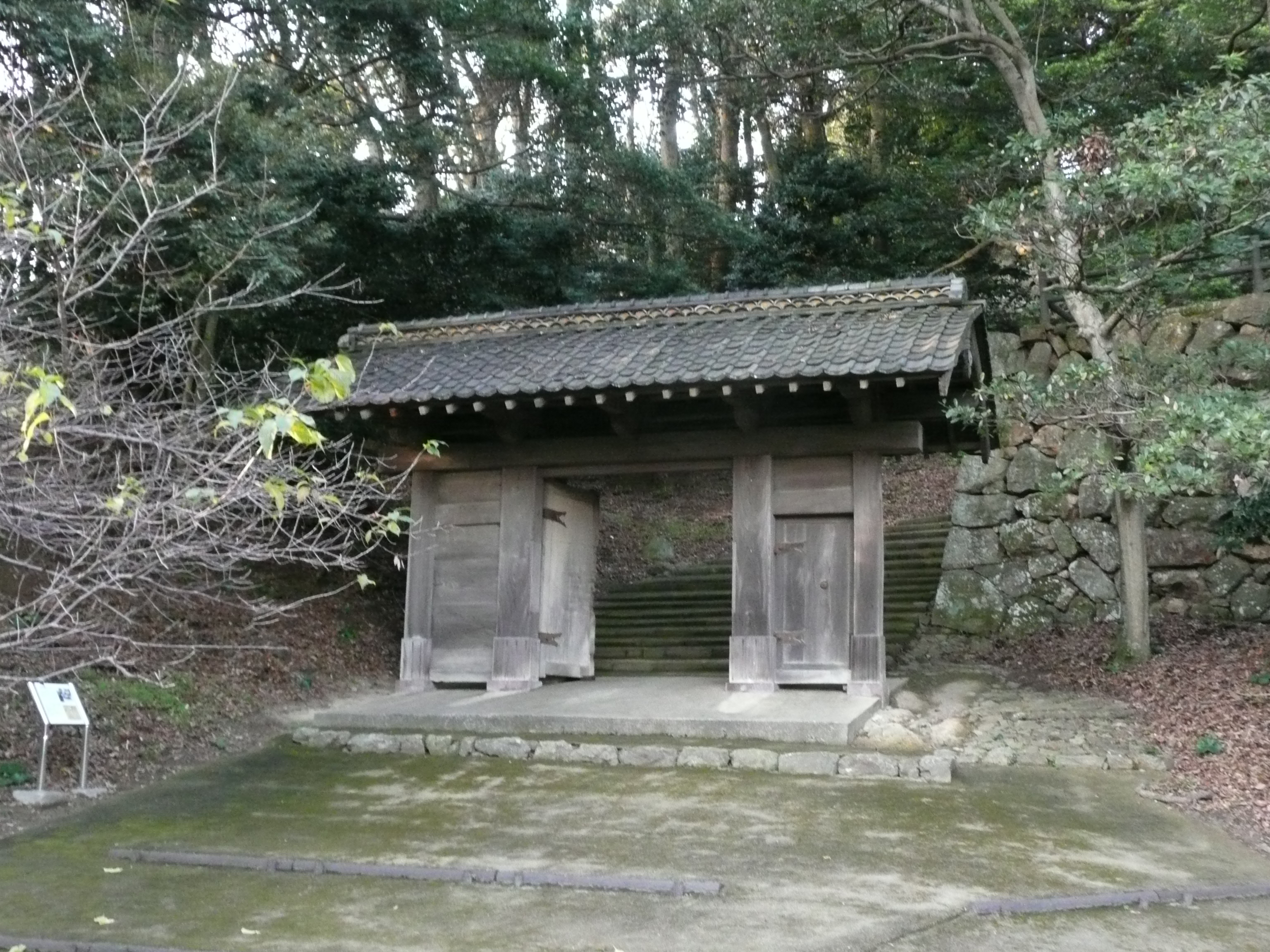
- Surviving gate of Hamada Castle

- Mon of the Ochi-Matsudaira clan
- Capital: Hamada Castle
- Area
  - Coordinates: 34°54′10.47″N 132°4′23.97″E
- Historical era: Edo period
  - Established: 1619
  - Abolition of the han system: 1866
- Contained within
  - Province: Iwami Province
- Today part of: Shimane Prefecture

Location of Hamada Castle
Hamada Domain (Japan)

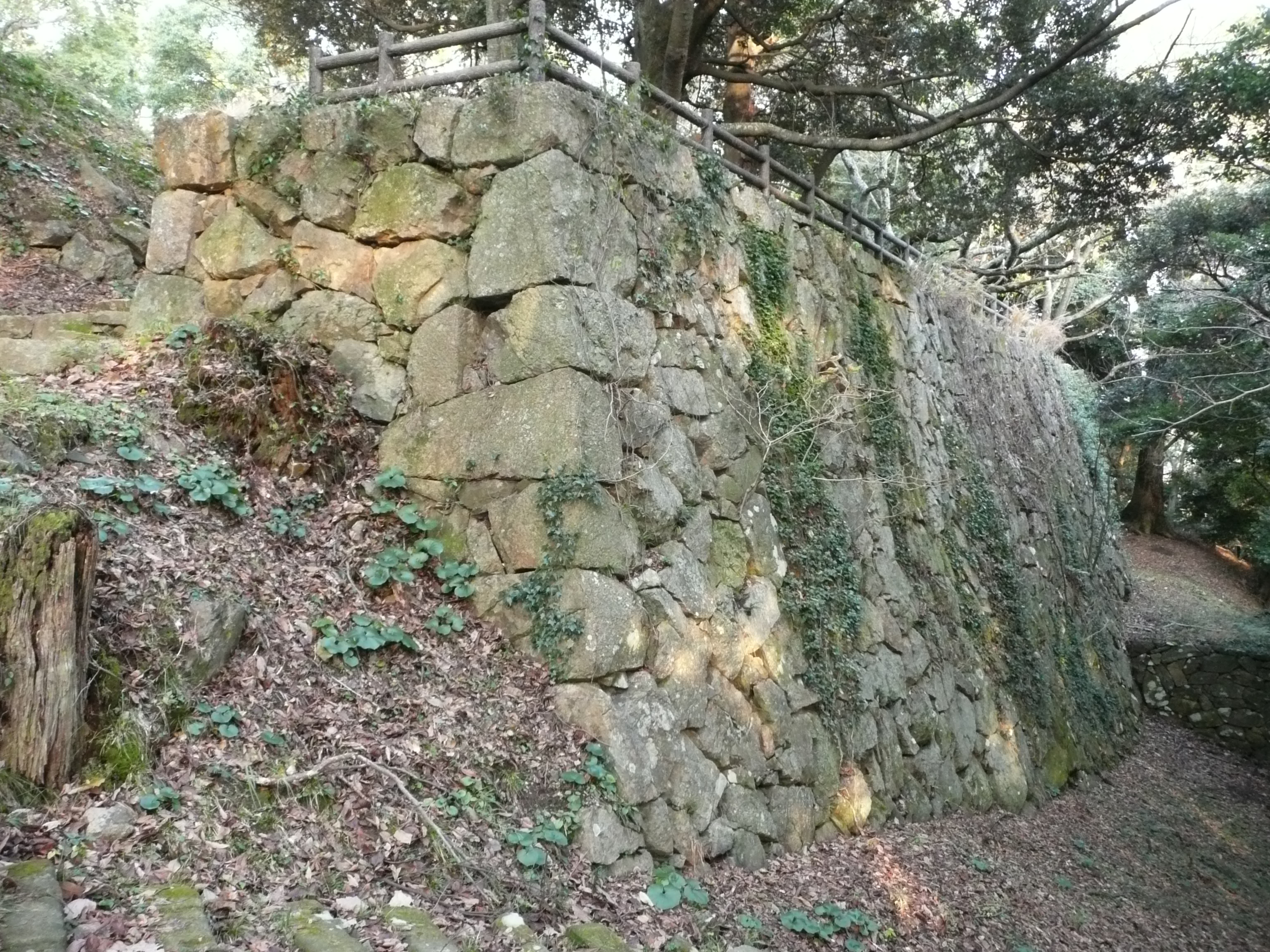
Surviving portion of San-no-maru wall of Hamada Castle

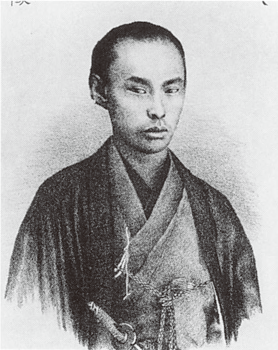
Matsudaira Takeakira, final daimyō of Hamada

Hamada Domain (浜田藩, Hamada-han) was a feudal domain under the Tokugawa shogunate of Edo period Japan, in what is now western Shimane Prefecture. It was centered around Hamada Castle and was ruled by mostly a succession of fudai daimyō of various branches of the Matsudaira clan. Hamada Domain was conquered by Chōshū Domain during the Bakumatsu period following the Second Chōshū expedition of 1866.

== History ==
During the Sengoku period, Iwami Province was part of the holdings of the Mōri clan. however, after the 1600 Battle of Sekigahara, the Tokugawa shogunate deprived the Mōri of two-thirds of their holdings, reducing the clan to the two provinces of Nagato and Suō. Iwami became part of the holdings of Sakazaki Naomori, one of Tokugawa Ieyasu's generals, who established his seat at Tsuwano. In 1616, Sakazaka was either killed or committed seppuku over the "Senhime incident". Sakazaki had been promised Ieyasu's daughter Senhime as his wife if he rescued her from Osaka Castle during the Siege of Osaka; however, afterwards Ieyasu gave her to Honda Takatoki instead. The incensed Sakazaka plotted to kidnap her, but the plot was discovered by the shogunate, and the Sakazaka clan was destroyed. The territory was held as tenryō territory directly subordinate to the shogunate for a few years, and in 1619 was awarded to Furuta Shigeharu from Ise-Matsuzaka Domain with a kokudaka of 54,000 koku. Furuta Shigeharu built Hamada Castle. In 1648, his son Furuta Shigetsune was enraged when he found that his senior retainers had made arrangements to adopt an heir from a cadet branch of the clan without his authorization and had them executed. The shogunate declared him to be insane, and ordered his seppuku and the attainder of the domain. In 1649, Matsudaira (Matsui) Yasue was transferred from Yamasaki Domain in Harima Province. The Matsudaira ruled the domain for five generations despite several large scale peasants revolts. The clan was transferred to Koga Domain in Shimōsa Province in 1759. The domain was then assigned to Honda Tadahisa, a direct descendant of Honda Tadakatsu. He stayed for ten years, and was transferred to Okazaki Domain, where he exchanged places with Matsudaira (Matsui) Yasuyoshi. His son, Matsudaira Yasuto, was able to increase the domain by 10,000 koku to 65,000 koku; however his son Matsudaira Yasutaka was discovered to have been smuggling with Korea in an effort to rebuild the domain's finances in what was later called the "Takeshima incident". He was relieved of office and the clan demoted to Tanagura Domain in Mutsu Province in 1836. Hamada Domain was then assigned to Matsudaira (Ochi) Nariatsu from Tatebayashi Domain. He traced his ancestry to a younger brother of Tokugawa Ienobu and the domain was thus a strong supporter of the shogunate in the Bakumatsu period. The fourth daimyō, Matsudaira Taketoshi, was adopted into the clan from the Mito Tokugawa clan. During the Second Chōshū expedition of 1866, his forces were completely crushed by the forces of Chōshū Domain under Ōmura Masujirō. He abandoned Hamada Castle and fled to Tsuruta, Mimasaka Province, which was an enclave of the Hamada Domain. Matsudaira Taketoshi proclaimed himself daimyō, of Tsuruta Domain, although the kokudaka of that territory was only 8000 koku. The shogunate agreed to make up the shortfall to officially qualify him as daimyō and he ruled Tsuruta to the Meiji restoration. Meanwhile, Chōshū forces occupied Hamada and declared its annexation to Chōshū. Following the Meiji restoration, It became "Omori Prefecture", together with former shogunate territory and the Iwami Ginzan Silver Mine, and subsequently "Hamada Prefecture" before it was incorporated into Shimane Prefecture.

== Holdings at the end of the Edo period ==
As with most domains in the han system, Hamada Domain consisted of several discontinuous territories calculated to provide the assigned kokudaka, based on periodic cadastral surveys and projected agricultural yields, g.

- Iwami Province
  - 46 villages in Ōchi District
  - 76 villages in Naka District
  - 49 villages in Mino District
- Mimasaka Province
  - 17 villages in Kumehokujo District, Hyōgo

== List of daimyō ==
#	Name	Tenure	Courtesy title	Court Rank	kokudaka
Furuta clan, 1619-1648 (Tozama)
1	Furuta Shigeharu (古田重治)	1619 - 1623	Daizen-no-suke (大膳亮)	Junior 5th Rank, Lower Grade (従五位下)	54,000 koku
2	Furuta Shigetsune (古田重恒)	1623 - 1648	Hyōbu-shōyu (兵部少輔)	Junior 5th Rank, Lower Grade (従五位下)	54,000 koku
Matsui-Matsudaira clan, 1649-1759 (Fudai)
1	Matsudaira Yasuteru (松平康映)	1649 - 1674	Suō-no-kami (周防守)	Junior 5th Rank, Lower Grade (従五位下)	50,000 koku
2	Matsudaira Yasunori (松平康宦)	1675 - 1705	Suō-no-kami (周防守)	Junior 5th Rank, Lower Grade (従五位下)	50,000 koku
3	Matsudaira Yasukazu (松平康員)	1705 - 1709	Suō-no-kami (周防守)	Junior 5th Rank, Lower Grade (従五位下)	50,000 koku
4	Matsudaira Yasutoyo (松平康豊)	1709 - 1735	Suō-no-kami (周防守)	Junior 5th Rank, Lower Grade (従五位下)	50,000 koku
5	Matsudaira Yasuyoshi (松平康福)	1736 - 1759	Suō-no-kami (周防守)	Junior 5th Rank, Lower Grade (従五位下)	50,000 koku
Honda clan, 1759-1769 (Fudai)
1	Honda Tadahisa (本多忠敞)	1759 - 1759	Nakatsukasa no taifu (中務大輔)	Junior 5th Rank, Lower Grade (従五位下)	50,000 koku
2	Honda Tadamitsu (本多忠盈)	1759 - 1767	Nakatsukasa no taifu (中務大輔)	Junior 5th Rank, Lower Grade (従五位下)	50,000 koku
3	Honda Tadatoshi (本多忠粛)	1767 - 1769	Nakatsukasa no taifu (中務大輔)	Junior 5th Rank, Lower Grade (従五位下)	50,000 koku
Matsui-Matsudaira clan, 1769-1836 (Fudai)
1	Matsudaira Yasuyoshi (松平康福)	1769 - 1783	Suō-no-kami (周防守), Jijū (侍従)	Junior 4th Rank, Lower Grade (従四位下侍従)	54,000 -> 64,000 koku
2	Matsudaira Yasusada (松平康定)	1783 - 1807	Suō-no-kami (周防守)	Junior 4th Rank, Lower Grade (従四位下)	64,000 koku
3	Matsudaira Yasuto (松平康任)	1837 - 1835	Shimosuke-no-kami (下野守)	Junior 4th Rank, Lower Grade (従四位下)	64,000 koku
4	Matsudaira Yasutaka (松平康爵)	1835 - 1836	Suō-no-kami (周防守)	Junior 5th Rank, Lower Grade (従五位下)	64,000 koku
Ochi-Matsudaira clan, 1836-1866 (Shinpan)
1	Matsudaira Nariatsu (松平斉厚)	1836 - 1839	Ukon-e-no-shōgen, (右近衛将監)	Junior 4th Rank, Upper Grade (従四位上)	61,000 koku
2	Matsudaira Takeoki (松平武揚)	1839 - 1842	Ukon-e-no-shōgen, (右近衛将監)	Junior 4th Rank, Lower Grade (従四位下)	61,000 koku
3	Matsudaira Takenari (松平武成)	1842 - 1847	Ukon-e-no-shōgen, (右近衛将監)	Junior 5th Rank, Lower Grade (従五位下)	61,000 koku
4	Matsudaira Takeakira (松平武聰)	1847 - 1866	Ukon-e-no-shōgen (右近衛将監) Jijū	Junior 4th Rank, Lower Grade (従四位下)	61,000 koku

== See also ==
- List of Han
- Abolition of the han system
