= Matsudaira Yasutō =

Japanese daimyō (1779–1841)

3rd Daimyō of Hamada
- In office 1807–1835
- Preceded by: Matsudaira Yasusada
- Succeeded by: Matsudaira Yasutaka

Personal details
- Born: 1779 Edo, Japan
- Died: September 7, 1841 (aged 61–62)

Matsudaira Yasutō (松平 康任; June 20, 1779 – September 7, 1841) was a Japanese senior councillor of the late Edo period. The seventh lord of the Hamada Domain, he was also the governor of Suō. He served in a variety of positions in the Tokugawa shogunate, including magistrate of temples and shrines, Osaka Castle warden and Kyoto Shoshidai. In 1826, he was made a rōjū; from 1834 to 35, he was chief rōjū (rōjū shusseki).

He resigned as senior councillor after being held responsible for the Sengoku incident, which brought him in conflict with Mizuno Tadakuni and his faction in the shogunate. In 1836, he was placed under permanent house arrest after he was implicated for smuggling in the Takeshima incident, and died the following year.

Preceded by Matsudaira Yasusada	3rd (Matsudaira/Matsui) Daimyō of Hamada; 1807–1835	Succeeded by Matsudaira Yasutaka
Preceded by Naitō Nobuatsu	40th Kyoto Shoshidai; 1825–1826	Succeeded by Mizuno Tadakuni
