= Iwakitaira Domain =

Feudal domain of Japan

Iwakitaira Domain 磐城平藩
- under Tokugawa shogunate Japan
- 1602–1871
- Capital: Iwakitaira Castle
- Area
  - Coordinates: 37°03′32.85″N 140°53′27.30″E
  - Type: Daimyō
- Historical era: Edo period
  - Split from Iwaki Domain: 1602
  - Torii: 1602
  - Naitō: 1622
  - Inoue: 1747
  - Andō: 1758
  - Disestablished: 1871
- Today part of: part of Fukushma Prefecture

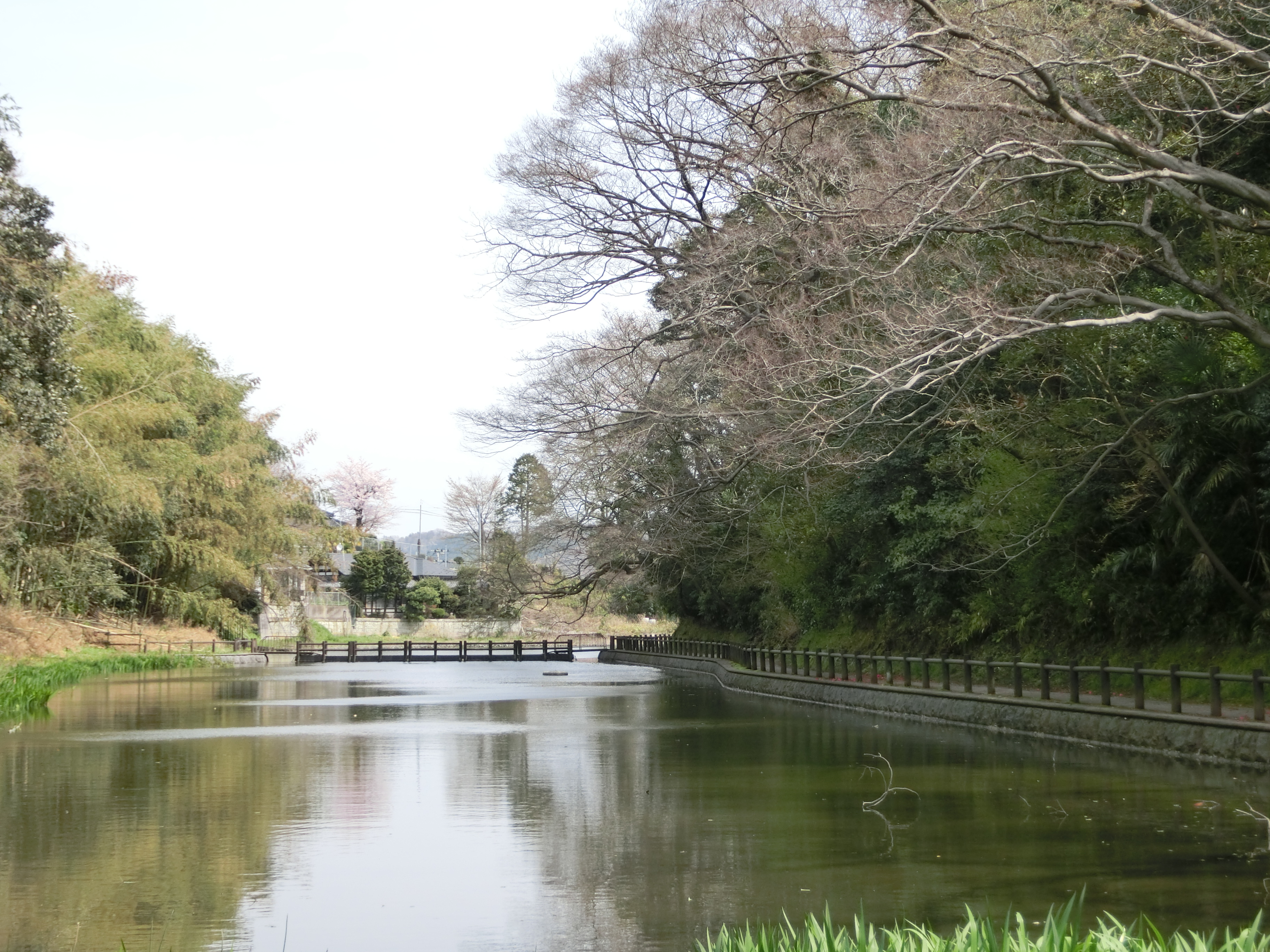
Surviving moat of Iwakitaira Castle

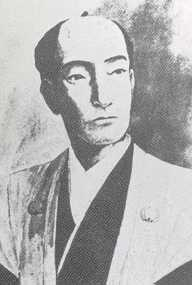
Andō Nobumasa

Iwakitaira Domain (磐城平藩, Iwakitaira-han) was a feudal domain under the Tokugawa shogunate of Edo period Japan., based at Iwakitaira Castle in southern Mutsu Province in what is now part of modern-day Iwaki, Fukushima. Its southern neighbor was the Mito Domain which was ruled by the Mito Tokugawa clan, and its northern neighbor was the Nakamura Domain which was ruled by the Sōma clan. The han school was the Shiseidō (施政堂), founded by the Andō clan. The most famous culture created in the Iwakitaira Domain is the Jangara Nembutsu dance.

== History ==
The southern Hamadōri region of ancient Iwaki Province was ruled by the Iwaki clan from the Heian period through the end of the Sengoku period. However, the clan sided with the western alliance loyal to Toyotomi Hideyori during the Battle of Sekigahara and was dispossessed by Tokugawa Ieyasu, who banished the clan to the minor Kameda Domain in what is now the city of Yurihonjō, Akita. The four districts forming the former territory of the Iwaki clan was given in 1600 as a 100,000 koku domain to Torii Tadamasa, a childhood friend of Ieyasu. Tadamasa changed the kanji of "Iwa" from "岩" to "磐", as he did not feel it was appropriate to continue using the same kanji as the clan which had opposed Ieyasu. Tadamasa constructed a new castle, and laid out a new castle town before being transferred to Yamagata Domain in 1622.

Iwakitaira Domain was reassigned to Naitō Masanaga. Masanaga transferred 20,000 koku domain to his eldest son, Naitō Tadaoki and another 10,000 koku to Hijikata Katsushige creating Izumi Domain and Kubota Domain, leaving Iwakitaira with 70,000 koku. Under early Naitō rule, the domain implemented numerous fiscal reforms, developed large amounts of new rice lands, and constructed massive irrigation works. However, this prosperity did not last long, as later Naitō rulers were very young and often dissolute, preferring to leave government matters in the hands of subordinates, who often formed rival cliques, leading to O-Ie Sōdō. A series of crop failures caused by implement weather led to a peasant revolt in 1738, at which point the Tokugawa shogunate stepped in, and transferred the Naitō to Nobeoka Domain in distant Kyushu.

Iwakitaira Domain was then assigned to Inoue Masatsune, with much reduced revenues of 37,000 koku. This was a significant demotion for Inoue, and history has little to stay of his ten-year tenure at Iwakitaira.

In 1756, Andō Nobunari, formerly of Kanō Domain in Mino Province was assigned to Iwakitaira. The revenues of the domain were set at 50,000 koku, which was a significant demotion from the 65,000 koku he enjoyed at Kanō Domain. However, after serving as jisha-bugyō and wakadoshiyori and from 1783 as rōjū, his revenues were supplemented with an additional 17,000 koku from his former holdings in Mino. The Andō clan continued to rule Iwakitaira domain through the remainder of the Edo period.

The 5th Andō daimyō, Andō Nobumasa was active as rōjū in the wake of Ii Naosuke's assassination and instrumental in the unequal treaty negotiations of the Bakumatsu period. Andō himself was also the target of an assassination attempt in 1862, which is remembered as the Sakashitamon Incident. Although forced to retire with a reduction to 40,000 koku (and subsequently to 30,000 koku) because of this incident, in 1868, during the Boshin War, Nobumasa took charge of the governance of Iwakidaira, and led its forces as part of the Ōuetsu Reppan Dōmei. During the Battle of Iwaki, Iwakitaira Castle was destroyed by the pro-imperial Satchō Alliance forces.

The final daimyō of Iwakitaira, Andō Nobutake, surrendered to the Meiji government in March 1868, even before the Battle of Iwaki, and had been confirmed in his titles in April. However, in December he was told that he would not be allowed to return to Iwakitaira, but would be given a new 34,000 koku domain in Iwai District, Rikuchu Province. Nobutake protested the decision, and after paying a 70,000 ryō fine on August 3, 1869, was permitted to return to Iwakitaira. He remained as domain governor until the abolition of the han system in July 1871.

== Holdings at the end of the Edo period ==
As with most fudai domains in the han system, Iwakitaira Domain consisted of several discontinuous territories calculated to provide the assigned kokudaka, based on periodic cadastral surveys and projected agricultural yields.

- Mutsu Province (Iwaki)
  - 9 villages in Kikuta District
  - 12 villages in Iwaki District
  - 42 villages in Iwasaki District
- Mino Province
  - 11 villages in Atsumi District
  - 2 villages in Haguri District
  - 6 villages in Motosu District
  - 11 villages in Katagata District

== List of daimyō ==
#	Name	Tenure	Courtesy title	Court Rank	kokudaka
Torii clan, 1602-1622 (fudai)
1	Torii Tadamasa (鳥居忠政)	1602–1622	Sakyō-no-suke (左京亮)	Junior 4th Rank, Lower Grade (従四位下)	120,000 koku
Naitō clan, 1622-1747 (fudai)
1	Naitō Masanaga (内藤政長)	1622–1634	Sama-no-suke (左馬助)	Junior 4th Rank, Lower Grade (従四位下)	70,000 koku
2	Naitō Tadaoki (内藤忠興)	1634–1670	Tatewaki (帯刀)	Junior 4th Rank, Lower Grade (従四位下)	70,000 koku
3	Naitō Yoshimune (内藤義概)	1670–1685	Sakyō-no-daifu (左京大夫)	Junior 4th Rank, Lower Grade (従四位下)	70,000 koku
4	Naitō Yoshitaka (内藤義孝)	1685–1712	Noto-no-kami (能登守)	Junior 5th Rank, Lower Grade (従五位下)	70,000 koku
5	Naitō Yoshishige (内藤義稠)	1712–1718	Sakyō-no-suke (左京亮)	Junior 5th Rank, Lower Grade (従五位下)	70,000 koku
6	Naitō Masagi (内藤政樹)	1718–1747	Bingo-no-kami (備後守)	Junior 5th Rank, Lower Grade (従五位下)	70,000 koku
Inoue clan, 1747-1758 (fudai)
1	Inoue Masatsune (井上正経)	1747–1758	Kawachi-no-kami (河内守); Jijū (侍従)	Junior 4th Rank, Lower Grade (従四位下)	37,000 koku
Andō clan, 1758-1868 (fudai)
1	Andō Nobunari (安藤信成)	1756–1810	Tsushima-no-kami (対馬守); Jijū(侍従)	Junior 4th Rank, Lower Grade (従四位下)	50,000 --> 67,000 koku
2	Andō Nobukiyo (安藤信馨)	1810–1812	Tsushima-no-kami (対馬守)	Junior 4th Rank, Lower Grade (従四位下)	67,000 koku
3	Andō Nobuyoshi (安藤信義)	1812–1829	Tsushima-no-kami (対馬守)	Junior 4th Rank, Lower Grade (従四位下)	67,000 koku
4	Andō Nobuyori (安藤信由)	1829–1847	Tsushima-no-kami (対馬守)	Junior 4th Rank, Lower Grade (従四位下)	67,000 koku
5	Andō Nobumasa (安藤信正)	1847–1862	Tsushima-no-kami (対馬守)	Junior 4th Rank, Lower Grade (従四位下)	30,000 koku
6	Andō Nobutami (安藤信民)	1862–1863	-none-	-none-	30,000 koku
7	Andō Nobutake (安藤信勇)	1863–1871	Tsushima-no-kami (対馬守)	Junior 5th Rank, Lower Grade (従五位下)	67,000 -->30,000 koku

=== Andō Nobunari ===
Andō Nobunari (安藤信成; March 18, 1743-June 15, 1810) was the 6th hereditary chieftain of the Andō clan and daimyō of Kanō Domain. He served in a number of posts within the Tokugawa shogunate. His courtesy title was Tsushima-no-kami, and Jijū, and his Court rank was Junior Fourth Rank, Lower Grade. Nobunari was the younger son of Andō Nobutada and became daimyō in 1755 at age 12 when his father was sentenced to house arrest over misgovernment of his domain. However, the following year, the Andō clan was ordered to relocate to Iwakitaira, with a reduction in their kokudaka from 65,000 to 50,000 koku. Nobunari subsequently served as jisha-bugyō (1781), wakadoshiyori (1784) and rōjū (1793), so that by 1793 he had increased his kokudaka back to 67,000 koku. He is also noted for establishing a han school in the domain, teaching kanji, the Four Books and Five Classics, Japanese language, calligraphy, military science and rangaku. His wife was the daughter of Matsudaira Takachika of Tanagura Domain. He died in 1810.

=== Andō Nobukiyo ===
Andō Nobukiyo (安藤信馨; December 5, 1768-November 25, 1812) was the 7th hereditary chieftain of the Andō clan and 2nd Andō daimyō of Iwakitaira. His courtesy title was Tsushima-no-kami, and his court rank was Junior Fourth Rank, Lower Grade. Nobukiyo was the younger son of Andō Nobunari. He became daimyō in 1810 on the death of his father, but died less than two years later in 1812 at the age of 45. His wife was the daughter of Kuze Hiroyasu of Sekiyado Domain. As his only surviving son, Nobuyori, was still an infant, the domain went to Nobuyoshi, a grandson of Nobunari and thus Nobuyoshi's uncle. His grave is at the temple of Seigan-in, in what is now Suginami, Tokyo.

=== Andō Nobuyoshi ===
Andō Nobuyoshi (安藤信義; October 6, 1785-February 13, 1844) was eldest son of Andō Nobuatsu, the eldest son of Andō Nobunari. On the death of Nobukiyo, he became the 8th hereditary chieftain of the Andō clan and 3rd Andō daimyō of Iwakitaira, as Nobukiyo's heir Nobuyori was still an infant. In 1816, he served as a sōshaban in the shogunal administration. In 1829, he adopted Nobuyori as his heir to restore the family lineage, and retired the same year. He died in 1843. His wife was a daughter of Tsugaru Yasuchika of Tsugaru Domain. His grave is at the temple of Seigan-in, in what is now Suginami, Tokyo.

=== Andō Nobuyori ===
Andō Nobuyori (安藤信由; November 16, 1801-July 16, 1847) was eldest son of Andō Nobukiyo. He became the 9th hereditary chieftain of the Andō clan and 4th Andō daimyō of Iwakitaira on the retirement of his uncle Nobuyoshi in 1829. In 1831, he served as a sōshaban in the shogunal administration. From 1833 to 1836, the Tenpō famine struck the domain, killing over 3000 people and ruining the domain's finances. Nobuyori died in 1847 at the age of 46. His wife was a daughter of Matsudaira Nobuakira of Yoshida Domain. His grave is at the temple of Seigan-in, in what is now Suginami, Tokyo.

=== Andō Nobumasa ===
Andō Nobumasa (安藤信正; January 10, 1820-November 20, 1871) was eldest son of Andō Nobuyori and 10th hereditary chieftain of the Andō clan. He was known most of his life as Andō Nobuyuki, taking the name of Nobumasa only after he became a rōjū. He became daimyō in 1847 on the death of his father. In 1848, he was promoted to the post of sōshaban. In 1858, he rose to the post of jisha-bugyō, and subsequently was appointed a wakadoshiyori under the Tairō Ii Naosuke. In 1860 he was appointed a rōjū, and placed in charge of foreign affairs. In 1860, Ii Naosuke was assassinated in the Sakuradamon Incident and Nobumasa became a leading councilor of state together with Kuze Hirochika. He was a supporter of the kobu-gattai policy to strengthen relations between the imperial court and the shogunate and was instrumental in arranging for Kazunomiya, the younger sister of Emperor Kōmei, to marry Shōgun Tokugawa Iemochi. Andō himself was the target of an assassination attempt in 1862 by six former Mito Domain samurai outside the Sakashita Gate of Edo Castle. Soon afterwards he was forced from office due to accusations of improper conduct in arranging for an heir to succeed Ii Naosuke and due to allegations that he had accepted bribes from American consul Townsend Harris. The kokudaka of Iwakitaira Domain was also reduced by 20,000 koku in 1863. However, his son and heir Andō Nobutami was still underage, so he continued to rule the domain from behind-the-scenes. Andō Nobutami died in 1863 and was replaced by an adopted heir, Andō Nobutake. In 1868, during the Boshin War, Nobumasa took the domain into the Ōuetsu Reppan Dōmei. The domain was overrun and Iwakitaira Castle was burned during the Battle of Iwakitaira, and the victorious Meiji government placed Nobumasa under permanent house arrest in 1868. He was released in 1869 and died in 1871.

=== Andō Nobutami ===
Andō Nobutami (安藤信由; November 10, 1859-September 22, 1863) was eldest son of Andō Nobumasa. He became the 11th hereditary chieftain of the Andō clan and 6th Andō daimyō of Iwakitaira on the forced retirement of Nobumasa in 1862 in what is known as the "Bunkyu Purge". In addition, the kokudaka of the domain was reduced to 30,000 koku. As Nobutami was only three years old at the time, Nobumasa continued to rule behind-the-scenes. He died two years later at the age of five. His grave is at the temple of Seigan-in, in what is now Suginami, Tokyo.

=== Andō Nobutake ===
Andō Nobutake (安藤信勇; November 24, 1849-May 24, 1908) was third son of Naitō Masayoshi of Iwamurada Domain in Shinano Province. He was adopted a posthumous heir to Nobutami as his mother was a daughter of Andō Nobuyori. He became the 12th hereditary chieftain of the Andō clan and 7th (and final) Andō daimyō of Iwakitaira in 1863. During the Boshin War, Andō Nobumasa supported the pro-Tokugawa Ōuetsu Reppan Dōmei; however, Nobutake supported the pro-Meiji forces and visited Kyoto, where he secretly pledged fealty to the Meiji government. Nevertheless, Iwakitaira Castle was destroyed during the Battle of Iwakitaira, and much to his disappointment, he was reassigned by the new government to a newly created 34,000 koku holding in former Nanbu territory in Rikuchū Province. He was able to recover Iwakitaira in August 1869 only after paying the government a massive 70,000 ryō fine. Less than two years later, with the abolition of the han system, he was forced to surrender Iwakitaira again, and relocate to Tokyo. He retired in 1872, turning the chieftainship of the clan to Nobutami's younger brother, Nobumori, and later worked as a professor at the Gakushūin Peer's School. He died in 1908.

== See also ==
- List of Han
- Abolition of the han system
