= Andō Nobumasa =

Japanese daimyo (1819–1871)

- 安藤 信正
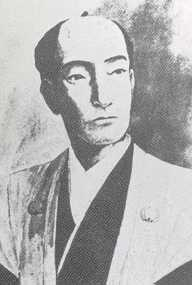
- Portrait of Andō Nobumasa
- Born: January 10, 1819; Edo, Tokugawa shogunate
- Died: November 20, 1871 (aged 52); Edo, Empire of Japan
- Predecessor: Andō Nobuyori
- Successor: Andō Nobutami
- Father: Andō Nobuyori

Daimyō of Iwakitaira Domain
- In office 1847–1862

Andō Nobumasa (安藤 信正; January 10, 1819 – November 20, 1871) was a late-Edo period Japanese samurai, and the 5th daimyō of Iwakitaira Domain in the Tōhoku region of Japan, and the 10th hereditary chieftain of the Andō clan. He was the eldest son of Andō Nobuyori and his mother was a daughter of Matsudaira Nobuakira of Yoshida Domain. His childhood names were Kinnoshin and Kinnosuke and he was known most of his life as Andō Nobuyuki, taking the name of Nobumasa only after he became a rōjū.

== Biography ==
Nobumasa was born at the domain's Edo residence, and was received in formal audience by Shōgun Tokugawa Ienari in 1835. He became daimyō in 1847 on the death of his father. In 1848, he was promoted to the post of sōshaban within the shogunal administration. In 1858, he rose to the post of jisha-bugyō, and subsequently was appointed a wakadoshiyori under the Tairō Ii Naosuke. In 1860 he was appointed a rōjū, and placed in charge of foreign affairs. Ii Naosuke was assassinated in the Sakuradamon Incident in 1860 and Andō Nobumasa became a leading councilor of state together with Kuze Hirochika. Among the many problems he faced in foreign affairs during this Bakumatsu period, was them the conclusion of a commercial treaty with Prussia, the assassination of Henry Heusken, and the appearance of a Russian warship claiming Tsushima Island for the Russian Empire.

Andō was also a supporter of the kobu-gattai policy to strengthen relations between the imperial court and the shogunate. He was instrumental in arranging for Kazunomiya, the younger sister of Emperor Kōmei, to marry Shōgun Tokugawa Iemochi. All of these actions aroused the enmity of pro-Sonnō jōi samurai, and Andō himself was the target of an assassination attempt in 1862 by six former Mito Domain samurai outside the Sakashita Gate of Edo Castle also called the Sakashita Gate Incident. British counsul-general Rutherford Alcock remarked on meeting the heavily-bandaged Andō shortly afterwards and was favourably impressed with his fortitude, stating that his injuries lent credence to claims by the shogunate that the opening of the country to foreign trade had to proceed slowly due to strong domestic opposition. However, Andō was forced from office soon afterwards by his political enemies, who accused him of improper conduct in arranging for an heir to succeed Ii Naosuke and due to allegations that he had accepted bribes from American consul Townsend Harris. The kokudaka of Iwakitaira Domain was also reduced by 20,000 koku. He officially retired in 1863; however as his son and heir Andō Nobutami was still underage, he continued to rule the domain from behind-the-scenes. Andō Nobutami died in 1863 and was replaced by an adopted heir, Andō Nobutake. In 1868, during the Boshin War, Nobumasa took the domain into the Ōuetsu Reppan Dōmei over the objections of Nobutake. The domain was overrun and Iwakitaira Castle was burned during the Battle of Iwakitaira, and the victorious Meiji government placed Nobumasa under permanent house arrest in 1868. He was released in 1869 and died in 1871 at the age of 52 years.

Preceded by Andō Nobuyori	5th (Andō) daimyō of Iwakitaira; 1847–1862	Succeeded by Andō Nobutami
