= Ansei Purge =

1858–60 removal of internal opposition in Tokugawa Japan

The Ansei Purge (安政の大獄, Ansei no taigoku, "Mass Incarceration of Ansei") was a multi-year event during the Bakumatsu period of Japanese history, between 1858 and 1860, (Note: The name "Ansei Purge" refers to the "Ansei era", a Japanese era that followed the Kaei era and was followed by the Man'en era. In other words, the Ansei Purge was an event that occurred during the Ansei era, which spanned the years 1854 through 1860.) during which the Tokugawa shogunate imprisoned, executed, or exiled those who did not support its authority and foreign trade policies. The purge was undertaken by Ii Naosuke in opposition to Imperial Loyalists.

== History ==
The Ansei Purge was ordered by Ii Naosuke on behalf of the bakufu faction. He was the Senior Minister during the period preceding the Meiji Restoration and was part of the kōbu gattai, the movement opposed by the Revere the Emperor, Expel the Foreigner (sonnō jōi) faction. The purge was carried out in an effort to quell opposition to trade treaties with the United States, Russia, Great Britain, France and the Netherlands, particularly under the U.S. - Japan Treaty of Amity and Commerce. It involved the removal from power all opposition by way of imprisonment, torture or exile, and execution. The crackdown also targeted those who opposed the succession of Tokugawa Iesada and the kōbu gattai or the policy that attempted to unite the imperial court and the shogunate. Some of the victims included the sonno joi, the group who opposed Naosuke's appointment of Tokugawa Iemochi over Hitotsubashi Keiki, the candidate of the Mito clan, which was one of the three branches of the Tokugawa family.

Japan descended into chaos after the purge. Elements seeking revenge, particularly radicals from Choshu and sympathizers of the victims launched widespread terrorism. Naosuke was also assassinated by a band of samurai and ronin from Mito. Those who were victimized by the purge reemerged in national politics such as Hitotsubashi Keikei and Matsudaira Shungaku. Attacks against Westerners also increased.

== Victims ==
Over 100 influential people were victims of the purge. Men were forced out of positions within the Bakufu, or from han leadership or from the Imperial Court in Kyoto. Victims of the purge included the following:

Death Penalty

- Yoshida Shōin
- Hashimoto Sanai

Permanent house arrest

- Mito Nariaki
- Nagai Naoyuki
- Prince Kuni Asahiko

House arrest

- Hitotsubashi Yoshinobu
- Tokugawa Yoshikatsu
- Matsudaira Shungaku
- Date Munenari
- Yamauchi Yōdō
- Hotta Masayoshi

=== Timeline ===
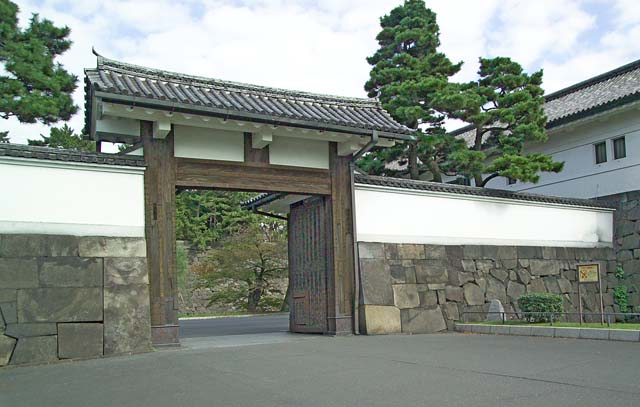
Edo Castle's Sakurada Gate (Sakurada-mon): The assassination of Ii Naosuke occurred nearby.

- 1858 (Ansei 5): Beginning of the Ansei Purge
- 1859 (Ansei 6): Arrests and investigations continuing.
- March 24, 1860 (Ansei 7, 3rd day of the 3rd month): Ii Naosuke was assassinated at the Sakurada Gate of Edo Castle. This is also known as the "Sakurada-mon Incident"
