= Iwakitaira Castle =

Castle in Iwaki, Japan

Iwakitaira Castle 磐城平城
- Iwaki, Fukushima Prefecture, Japan
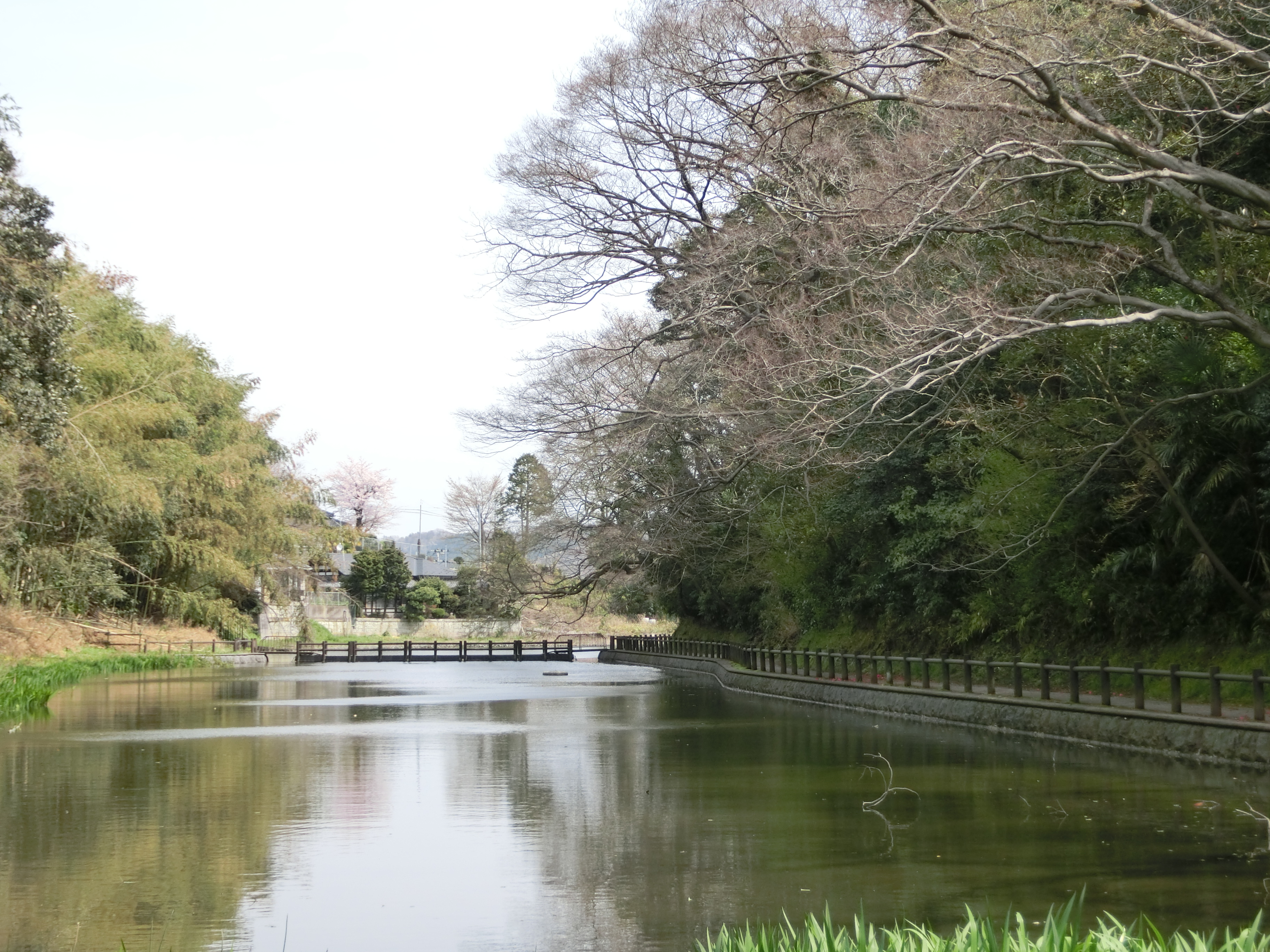
- surviving moat of Iwakitaira Castle

Site information
- Type: yamashiro-style Japanese castle
- Open to the public: partly
- Condition: Ruins

Location
- Coordinates: 37°03′32.85″N 140°53′27.30″E

Site history
- Built: 1603
- Built by: Torii Tadamasa
- In use: Edo period
- Demolished: 1868

Iwakitaira Castle (磐城平城, Iwakitaira-jō) is a hilltop-style Japanese castle located in the city of Iwaki, Fukushima Prefecture, in the Tōhoku region of Japan. It also called Ryūgajō Castle (龍ヶ城) . Built in the early Edo period, it served as the headquarters for a succession of daimyō of Iwakitaira Domain under the Tokugawa shogunate. The site is now mostly on private lands, with only a small portion of the moats and ramparts remaining.

== Background ==
The castle is located at the tip of the tongue plateau extending east, protected on three sides by the U-shaped Tangosawa lake. The Main Bailey (Honmaru) was at the southeast end of the plateau, and the Second Bailey (Ninomaru) was on a ridge that protruded northeast. On the west side was the Third Bailey (Sannomaru). Two large, moated, rectangular enclosures completed the defences. The castle was built without a donjon, but utilised a three-story yagura in its place. At its height, the castle had 17 yagura and 24 gates.

== History ==
In the late 11th century, the Iwaki clan of Hitachi Province invaded the Iwaki, and seized control of the southern half of the Hamadōri region. This was divided it into four districts of Yoshima, Iwasaki, Iwaki, and Naraha, which they ruled from the Kamakura period to the end of the Sengoku period. However, in 1600, Iwaki Sadataka sided with the Western Army of Ishida Mitsunari against the Tokugawa clan at the Battle of Sekigahara, and as a result, the Iwaki clan was dispossessed of its territories with the formation of the Tokugawa shogunate. Tokugawa Ieyasu awarded the area to Torii Tadamasa as part of a new domain with an assessed kokudaka of 100,000 koku. Tadamasa was the son of Ieyasu' childhood friend and retainer, Torii Mototada, who had been killed by Toyotomi forces at the Siege of Fushimi shortly before the Battle of Sekigahara. Tadamasa began construction of the new castle in 1603, and it took twelve years to complete.

Shōgun Tokugawa Hidetada was so impressed with the work Tadamasa did on the castle and surrounding jōkamachi that he reassigned him to Yamagata Domain with doubled the kokudaka. As a fudai daimyō holding, Iwakitaira Castle changed hands several times through the Edo Period. It was ruled by the Naitō clan from 1622 to 1747, Inoue clan from 1747 to 1758, and the Andō clan from 1758 to 1868. During the Boshin War, the domain was a member of the Ōuetsu Reppan Dōmei, and during the Battle of Iwakitaira, the castle was fired by the karō of the domain to prevent it from falling into the hands of the Meiji government.

== Current situation ==
After the Meiji restoration, in 1897 the Japanese Government Railway filled in the inner moat of Iwakidaira Castle and made Taira Station, running the tracks of the Jōban Line railway through the middle of the site of the castle. Most of the lands occupied by the castle were sold as residential lots, and are now in private hands, but part of the inner moat area was preserved as a public park. All that remains are some small fragments of the earthen ramparts, and a section of moat near the train station. Discussions to restore some portion of the castle have been floated over the years, but due to lack of funds, no action has been taken.

== Literature ==
- Schmorleitz, Morton S. (1974). Castles in Japan. Tokyo: Charles E. Tuttle Co. pp. 144–145. ISBN 0-8048-1102-4.
- Motoo, Hinago (1986). Japanese Castles. Tokyo: Kodansha. p. 200 pages. ISBN 0-87011-766-1.
- Mitchelhill, Jennifer (2004). Castles of the Samurai: Power and Beauty. Tokyo: Kodansha. p. 112 pages. ISBN 4-7700-2954-3.
- Turnbull, Stephen (2003). Japanese Castles 1540-1640. Osprey Publishing. p. 64 pages. ISBN 1-84176-429-9.
