= Sakuradamon Incident (1860) =

Japanese assassination of a Tokugawa official

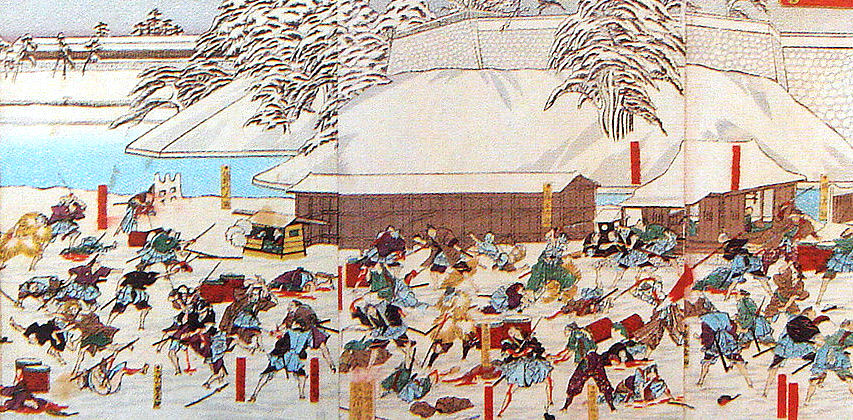
- Sakuradamon incident. Detail from print
- Native name: 桜田門外の変
- Date: March 24, 1860
- Location: Sakurada Gate, Edo Castle, present-day Tokyo, Japan; 35°40′40″N 139°45′10″E
- Type: Assassination
- Motive: Opposition to the signing of the 1858 Treaty of Amity and Commerce
- Target: Ii Naosuke
- Participants: Rōnin samurai
- Casualties: Ii Naosuke

The Sakuradamon Incident (桜田門外の変, Sakuradamon-gai no Hen; or 桜田門の変 Sakuradamon no Hen) was the assassination of Ii Naosuke, Chief Minister (Tairō) of the Tokugawa shogunate, on March 24, 1860, by rōnin samurai of the Mito and Satsuma Domains, outside the Sakurada Gate of Edo Castle.

== Context ==
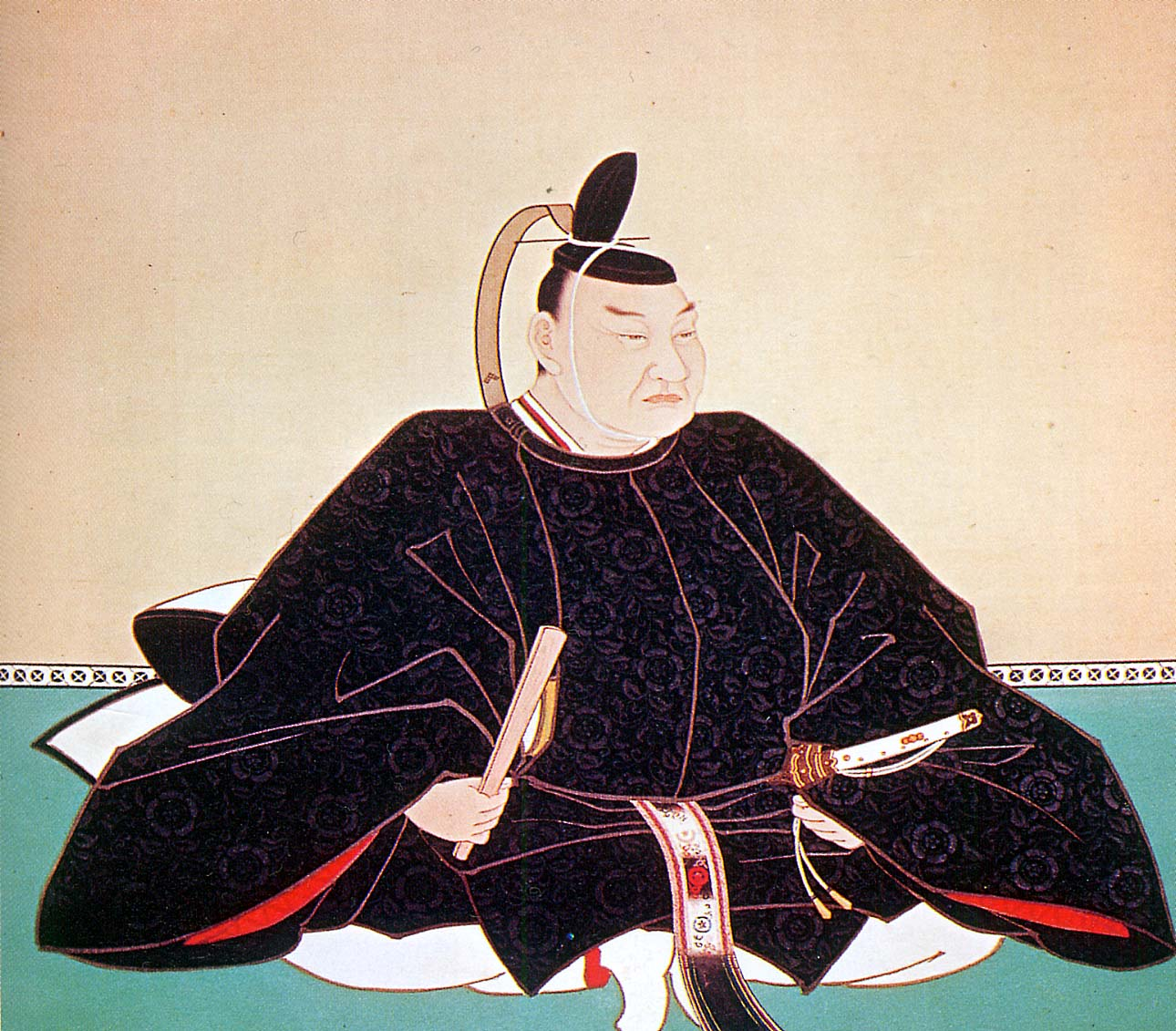
In 1860, Ii Naosuke was the most influential advisor to the shogunate.

Ii Naosuke, a leading figure of the Bakumatsu period and a proponent of the reopening of Japan after more than 200 years of seclusion, was widely criticized for signing on behalf of the Tokugawa Shogunate the 1858 Treaty of Amity and Commerce with the United States (negotiated by U.S. Consul to Japan Townsend Harris) and, soon afterwards, similar treaties with other Western countries. The Harris Treaty was signed by the Tokugawa Shogunate in defiance of Emperor Kōmei's instructions not to sign the treaty, thus branding the Shogunate as having betrayed the emperor and by extension, the country. From 1859, the ports of Nagasaki, Hakodate, and Yokohama became open to foreign traders as a consequence of the treaties and foreigners were granted extraterritoriality, among a number of trading stipulations.

Ii was also criticized for reinforcing the authority of the Tokugawa shogunate against regional daimyōs through the Ansei Purge. He also made strong enemies in the dispute for the succession of Shōgun Tokugawa Iesada, and because he forced retirement on his opponents, specifically the retainers of Mito, Hizen, Owari, Tosa, Satsuma, and Uwajima.

These policies generated strong sentiment against the shogunate, especially among proponents of the Mito school.

== Assassination ==
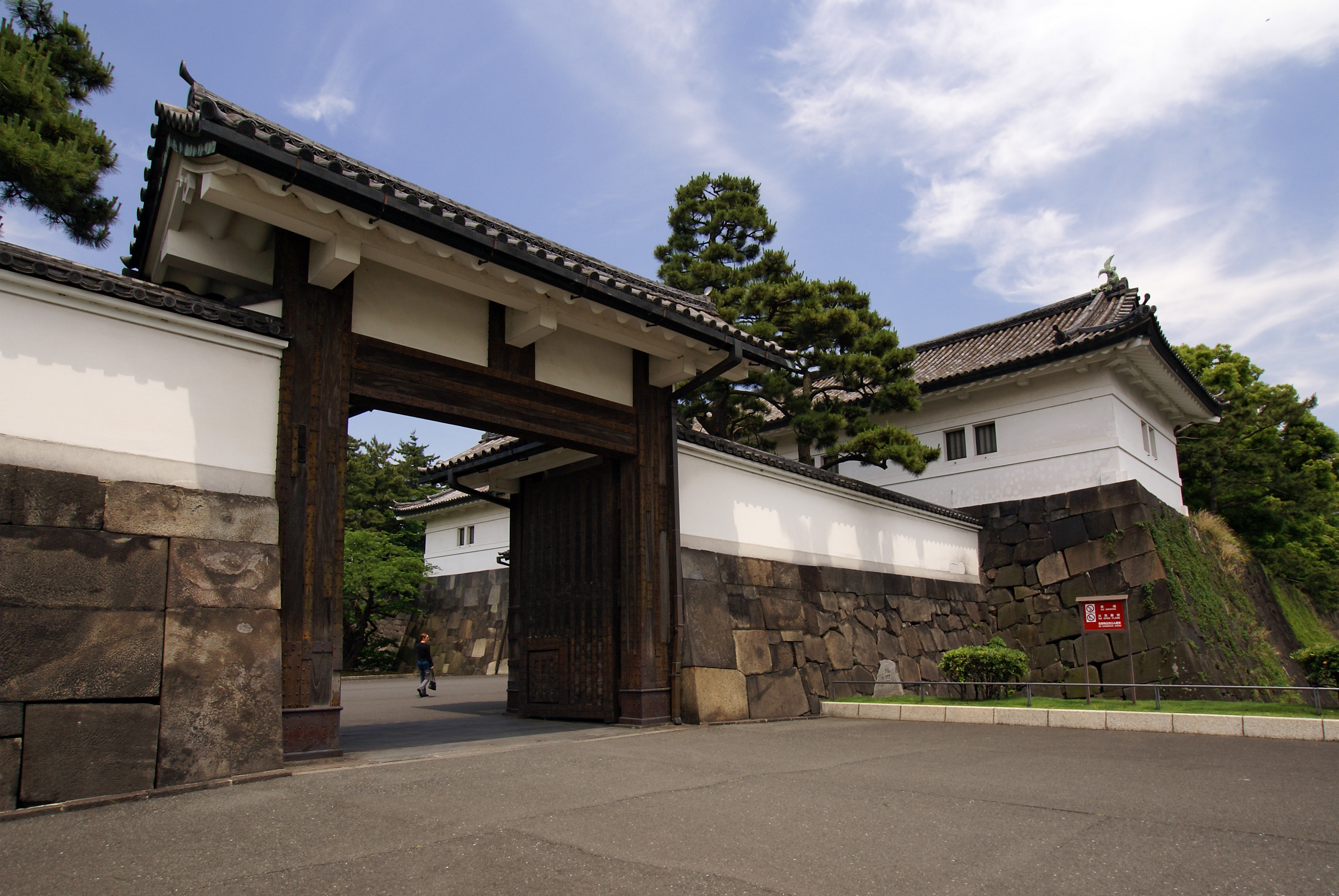
The Sakuradamon gate in 2007.

The assassination took place on March 24, 1860, on the day of the Double Third Festival where all daimyos stationed in Edo (modern Tokyo) were scheduled to enter Edo Castle for meetings. The assassins attacked Ii's entourage just outside the Castle, near the Sakuradamon (Sakurada Gate) when Ii was reaching the premises. Ii had been warned about his safety, and many encouraged him to retire from office, but he refused, replying that "My own safety is nothing when I see the danger threatening the future of the country".

Ii's entourage was composed of around 60 samurai guards and Ii's palanquin carriers. A total of 17 Mito rōnin ambushed Ii together with Arimura Jisaemon, the lone member of the group who was not from Mito since he was a samurai from Satsuma Domain. While an attack at the front drew the attention of the guards, a lone assassin fired one shot into the palanquin containing Ii, with a Japanese-made Colt 1851 Navy Revolver, which had been copied from the firearms that Commodore Matthew Perry had given the shogunate as gifts. Drawing the injured and likely paralyzed Ii out, Arimura decapitated Ii and then performed seppuku.

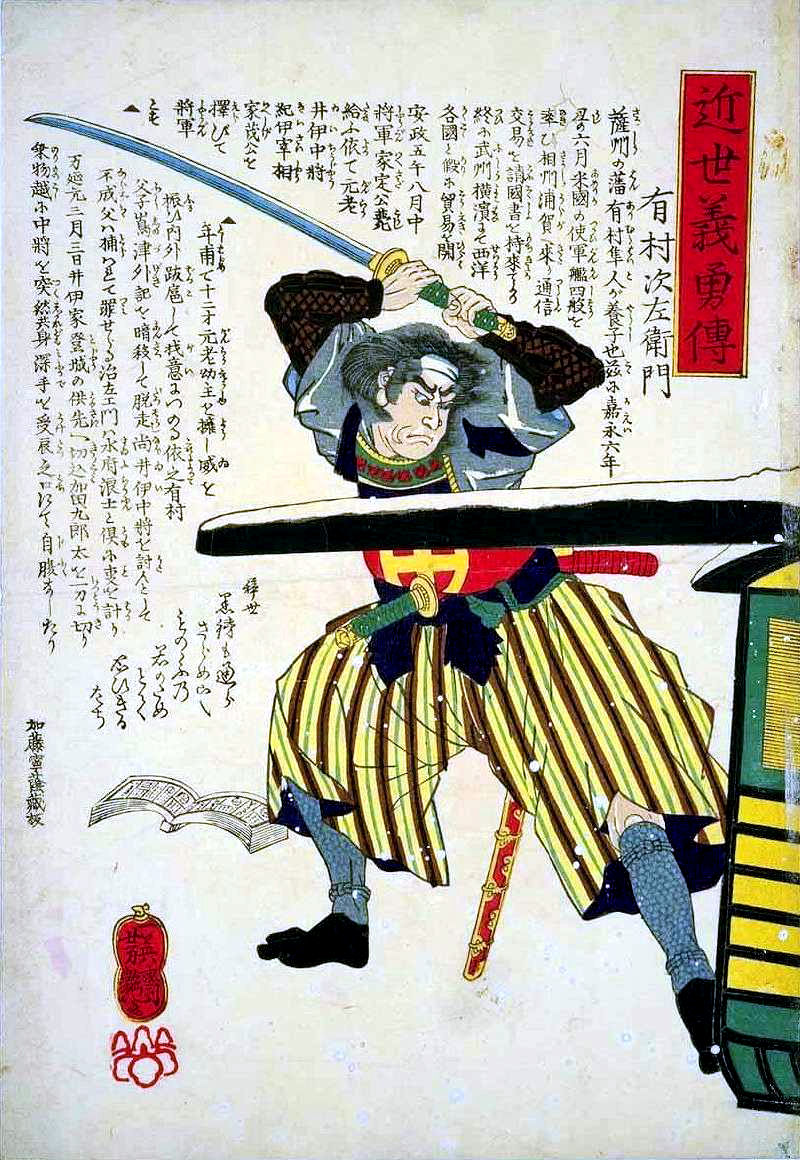
Arimura Jisaemon, on the point of committing the assassination. Woodblock print by Utagawa Kuniyoshi.

The conspirators carried a manifesto on themselves, outlining the reason for their act:

While fully aware of the necessity for some change in policy since the coming of the Americans at Uraga, it is entirely against the interest of the country and a stain on the national honour to open up commercial relations with foreigners, to admit foreigners into the Castle, to conclude treaties with them, to abolish the established practice of trampling on the picture of Christ, to allow foreigners to build places of worship for the evil religion, and to allow the three Foreign Ministers to reside in the land ... Therefore, we have consecrated ourselves to be the instruments of Heaven to punish this wicked man, and we have taken on ourselves the duty of ending a serious evil, by killing this atrocious autocrat.

— Manifesto of the Sakuradamon conspirators.

Accounts of the violent event were sent via ship across the Pacific to San Francisco and then sped by the Pony Express across the American West. On June 12, 1860, The New York Times reported that Japan's first diplomatic mission to the West received the news about what had happened in Edo. The assassination dealt a severe blow to the prestige of the shogunate such that officials refused to admit Naosuke's death for a month, claiming that he was merely injured and was recuperating. The minister's death was only made official in April when the office of Tairo was declared vacant.

== Fate and punishment of Ii Naosuke's entourage ==
Out of the 60 samurai guards defending Ii Naosuke, four died in combat and four died within days from fatal wounds. Those samurai who were killed in action were allowed to keep and pass on their hereditary samurai titles (thus privilege) to their heirs.

Survivors, however, all received various degrees of punishment for failing to protect the Chief Minister. Two years after the incident in 1862, investigation was completed and verdicts were reached to punish the surviving guards. The seriously wounded, such as Shugoro Kusakari, were exiled to the Sano, Shimotsuke Province and had their stipends reduced. The slightly wounded were ordered to commit seppuku, and all the unharmed were beheaded, with their samurai status revoked and attainded.

== Consequences ==
The popular upheaval against foreign encroachment and assassination of Ii forced the Bakufu to soften its stance, and to adopt a compromise policy of kōbu gattai ("Union of the Emperor and the Shogun") suggested by Satsuma Domain and Mito Domain, in which both parties vied for political supremacy in the years to follow. This soon amplified into the violent Sonnō Jōi ("Revere the Emperor, Expel the Barbarians") movement. The Sakuradamon Incident ushered in a decade of violence in Japan, reviving the culture of the warrior rule and warrior spirit. Prior to the event, the warrior class had been described as weak and incapable of fighting, having lost all sense of warrior mission amid Japan's move toward modernization.

For the following years until the fall of Bakufu in 1868, Edo, and more generally the streets of Japan, would remain notably hazardous for Bakufu officials (as displayed in events such as the attack on Andō Nobumasa) and foreigners alike (Richardson murder), as the Sonnō Jōi movement continued to expand. According to Sir Ernest Satow: "A bloody revenge was taken on the individual [Ii], but the hostility to the system only increased with time, and in the end brought about its complete ruin".

The conflict reached its resolution with the military defeat of the shogunate in the Boshin War, and the installation of the Meiji Restoration in 1868. Despite the defeat of the Bakufu, the new government adopted a policy of trade and diplomatic relations with the Western powers closer to that of Ii Naosuke than that of his assassins.

== See also ==
- Hikone Domain
- Mito Domain
- Mito Rebellion (Tengutō Rebellion)
- Tsuruga: The city which reconciled Mito and Hikone.
- Sakashita Gate Incident: January 15, 1862 Attempted assassination of Rōjū Andō Nobumasa by 6 samurai from Mito Domain.
- Samurai Assassin: 1965 film inspired by the incident.
