= Torii Tadamasa =

Japanese daimyō

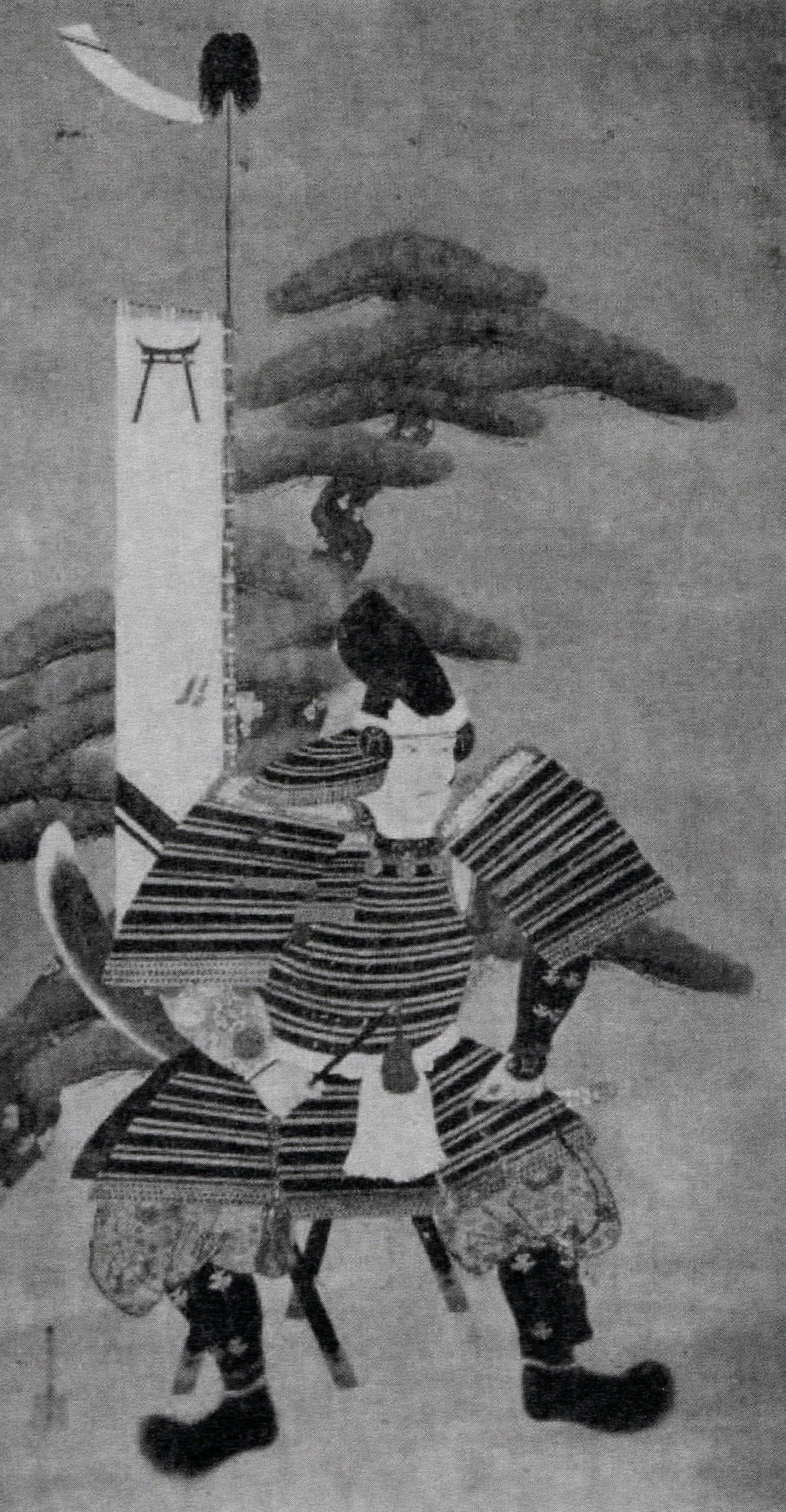

Torii Tadamasa (鳥居 忠政; 1567 – October 2, 1628) was a Japanese feudal lord of the Azuchi-Momoyama and early Edo periods, who served Tokugawa Ieyasu and played a role in controlling the military in the eastern provinces.

== History ==
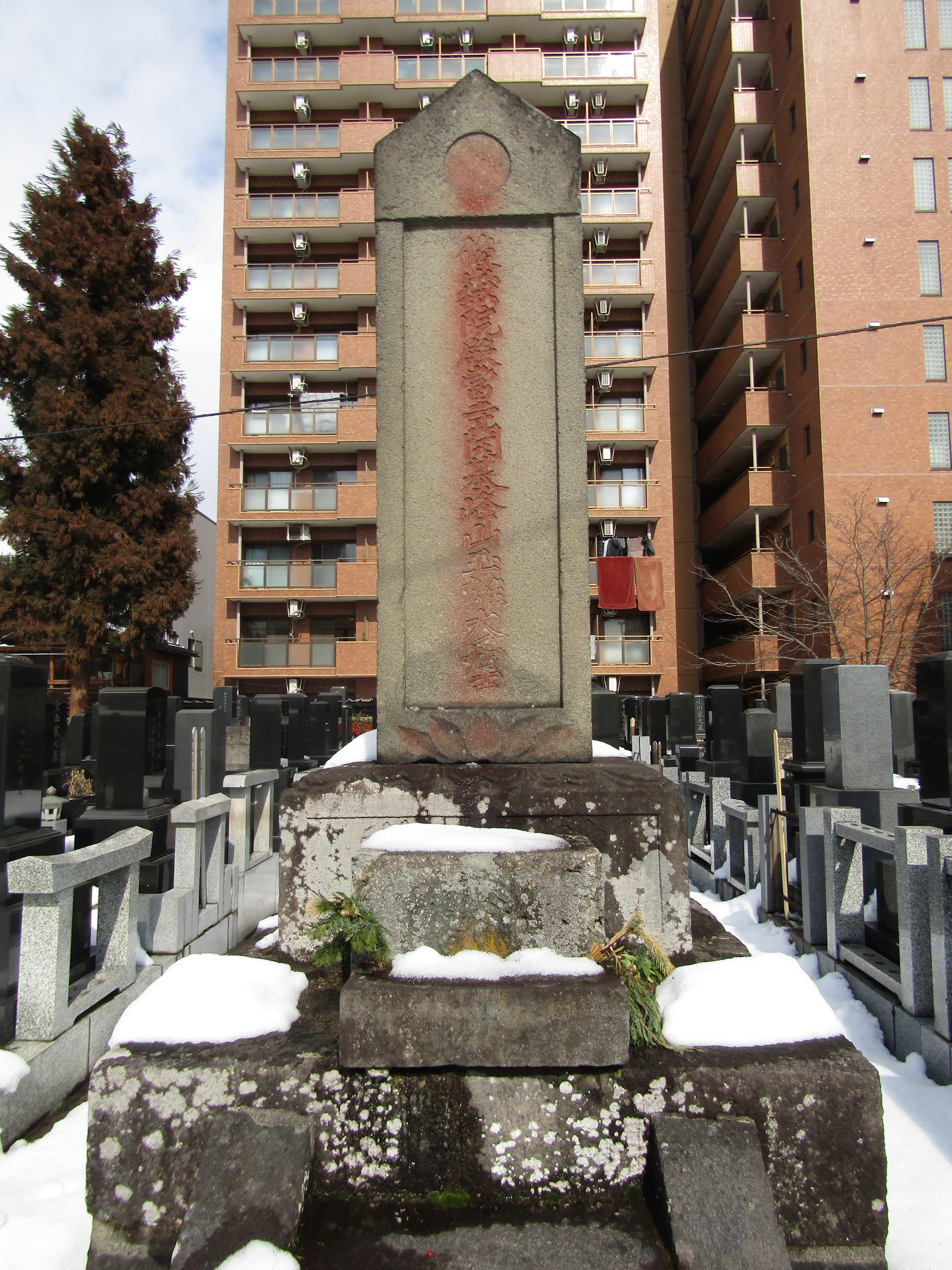
Grave of Torii Tadamasa

The second son of Ieyasu's chief vassal Torii Mototada, when his father died during the Siege of Fushimi Castle, Tadamasa inherited Yahagi Domain in Shimōsa Province, worth 40,000 koku. For distinguished service in the battle, he was awarded the Iwakitaira Domain in Japan's Mutsu Province, worth 100,000 to 120,000 koku.

In 1622, he was moved to the larger fief of Yamagata in Dewa Province, worth 220,000 koku. In 1626, the first actual land survey of the region was carried out in Yamagata; the survey became widely known as the "Sakyo Rope".

Preceded by Torii Mototada	Daimyō of Yasaku; 1600–1602	Succeeded by Miura Masatsugu
Preceded by none	Daimyō of Iwakitaira; 1602–1622	Succeeded by Naitō Masanaga
Preceded by Mogami Yoshitoshi	Daimyō of Yamagata; 1622–1628	Succeeded by Torii Tadatsune
