= Andō clan =

Japanese samurai kin group

Andō 安藤
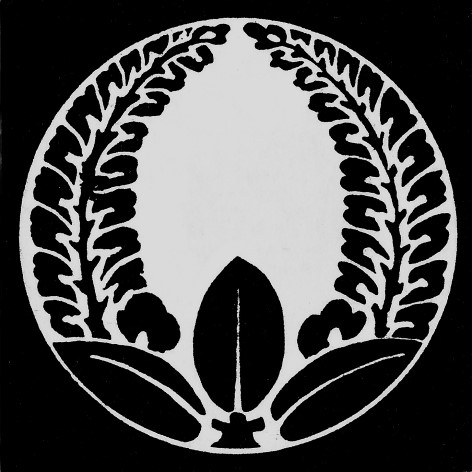
- Family crest of the Andō clan
- Home province: Mutsu
- Parent house: Abe clan of Ōshū
- Final ruler: Andō Naoyuki

The Andō clan (安藤氏, Andō-shi) is a Japanese samurai kin group.

== History ==
The clan claims descent from Abe no Hirafu and Abe no Nakamaro. During the Kamakura period, the clan served as the Presiding Governors of Ezo. The clan served the Tokugawa clan during Edo Period. Their first recorded family head, Andō Naotsugu was eldest son of Andō Haruyoshi and grandson of Andō Ieshige, retainer of Matsudaira Hirotada (father of Tokugawa Ieyasu).

== Head family (ruled Kii-Tanabe domain) ==
- Andō Naotsugu (1555–1635)
- Andō Naoharu (1607–1636)
- Andō Yoshikado (1636–1654)
- Andō Naokiyo (1633–1692)
- Andō Naona (1680–1708)
- Andō Nobutake (1688–1717)
- Andō Nobusada (1717–1725)
- Andō Katsuyoshi (1715–1730)
- Andō Tsuguyuki (1716–1765)
- Andō Hironaga (1747–1771)
- Andō Tsugunori (1749–1827)
- Andō Michinori (1760–1825)
- Andō Naotomo (1790–1809)
- Andō Michinori (1780–1823) (2nd)
- Andō Naoka (1786–1826)
- Andō Naohiro (1821–1858)
- Andō Naoyuki (1858–1908)
- Andō Naotada

== Branch Family ==
First head family was Andō Nobushige, younger brother of Andō Naotsugu, son of Andō Haruyoshi and grandson of Andō Ieshige

=== Head Family ===
1. Andō Shigenobu (1557–1621) of Takasaki Domain and Omigawa Domain
2. Andō Shigenaga (1600–1657) of Takasaki Domain
3. Andō Shigehiro (1640–1698) of Takasaki Domain and Bitchū-Matsuyama Domain
4. Andō Nobutomo (1671–1732) of Bitchū-Matsuyama Domain and Kanō Domain
5. Andō Nobutada (1717–1771) of Kanō Domain
6. Andō Nobunari (1743–1810) of Kanō Domain and Iwakitaira Domain
7. Andō Nobukiyo (1768–1812) of Iwakitaira Domain
8. Andō Nobuyoshi (1785–1844) of Iwakitaira Domain
9. Andō Nobuyori (1801–1847) of Iwakitaira Domain
10. Andō Nobumasa of Iwakitaira Domain
11. Andō Nobutami (1859–1863) of Iwakitaira Domain
12. Andō Nobutake (1849–1908) of Iwakitaira Domain
13. Andō Nobuuji
