= Kōbu gattai =

Xenophobic protectionist policy in Tokugawa Japan

Kōbu gattai (公武合体; Union of the Imperial Court and the Shogunate) was a policy in the Bakumatsu era of Japanese history aiming to strengthen Japan against the perceived "foreign threat" by obtaining a political coordination between the Tokugawa shogunate, certain major feudal domains and the Japanese Imperial Court.

== Overview ==
Following the Perry Expedition, of 1853, and particularly after the signing of the Harris Treaty with the US in 1858, the inability of a politically weak Tokugawa shogunate to reach a consensus on how to handle overseas demands that Japan end its national isolation policy and the signing of unequal treaties with foreign powers, led to members of the kuge aristocracy starting to meddle in national political policy by meeting in Kyoto directly with members of various feudal domains. In 1858, the shogunate under tairō Ii Naosuke attempted to end this direct daimyō–Imperial Court collusion with a harsh purge (the "Ansei Purge") of those who did not support its authority and foreign trade policies. while simultaneously promoting closer ties between the Shogunate and the Imperial Court. This took the form of a proposed political marriage between Shogun Tokugawa Iemochi and the sister of the Emperor, Princess Kazunomiya.

Following the murder of Ii Naosuke in 1860 and the attempted assassination of his successor, Andō Nobumasa, the idea of kōbu gattai faded into the background. It was strongly opposed by proponents of the Sonnō jōi movement, who sought to overthrow the shogunate and restore political power to the Emperor, as well as by major daimyō such as Shimazu Hisamitsu of Satsuma Domain and Matsudaira Shungaku of Fukui Domain who sought a compromise proposal whereby the Tokugawa clan would retain some measure of hegemony under a European-style parliamentary system. Despite this opposition, the marriage between Shogun Tokugawa Iemochi and Princess Kazunomiya took place in 1862. Tokugawa Iemochi died in 1866, by which time events had increasingly rendered the kōbu gattai concept obsolete. In 1868, the Boshin War and the Meiji restoration rendered kōbu gattai irrelevant.
