= Treaty of Amity and Commerce (United States–Japan) =

1858 US–Tokugawa shogunate agreement

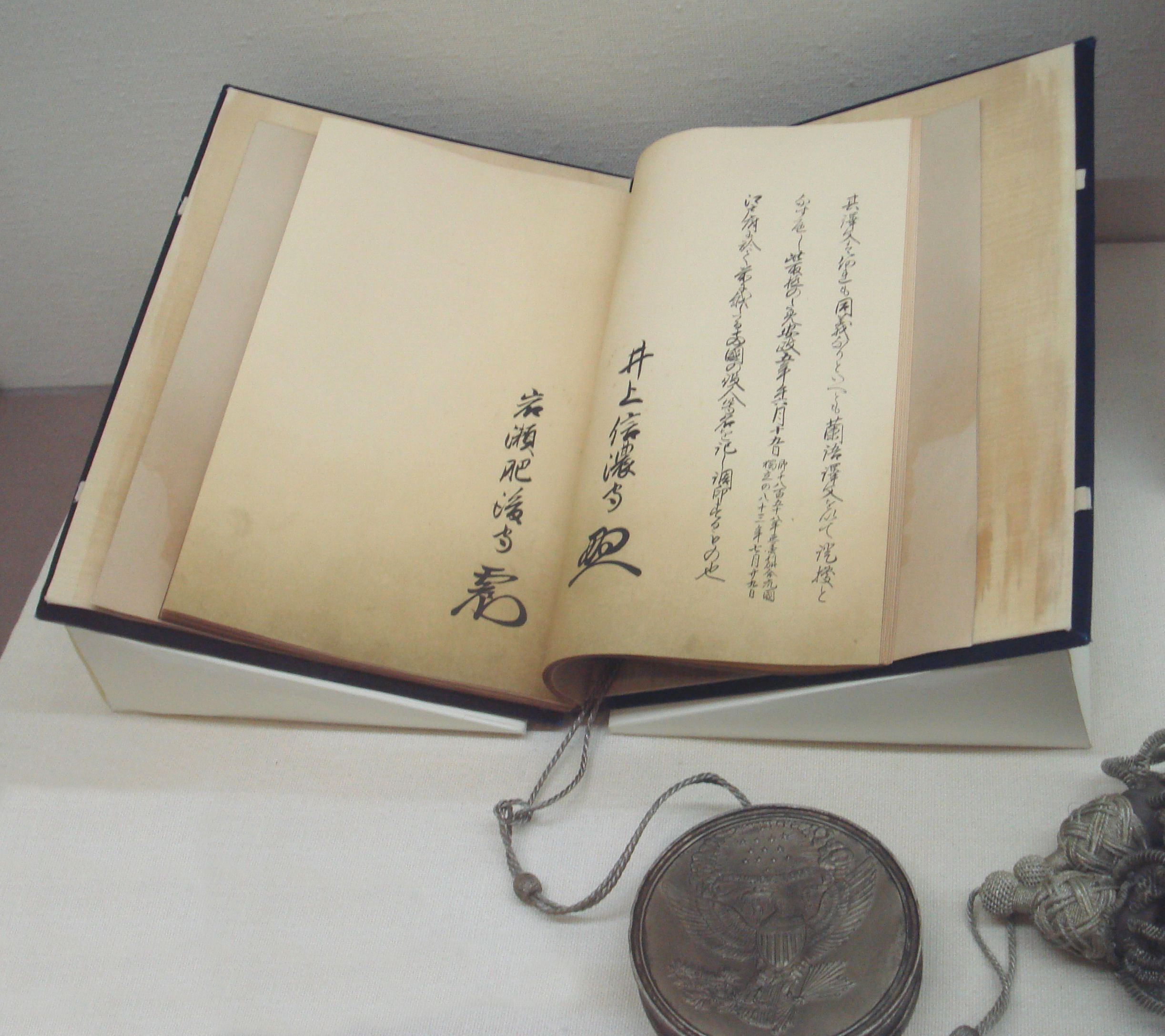
Treaty of Amity and Commerce between Japan and the United States, or "Harris Treaty", 29 July 1858. Diplomatic Record Office of the Ministry of Foreign Affairs (Japan)

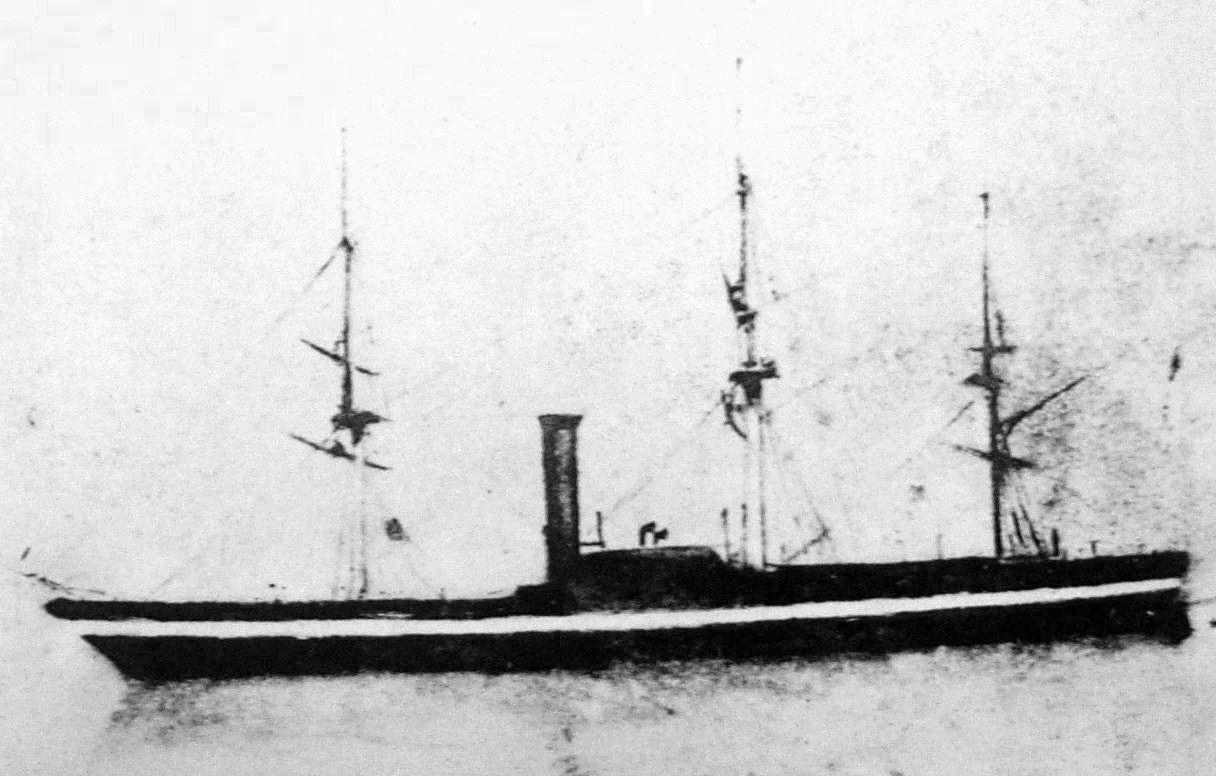
USS Powhatan (1850)

The Treaty of Amity and Commerce between Japan and the United States (日米修好通商条約, Nichibei Shūkō Tsūshō Jōyaku), also called the Harris Treaty was a treaty signed between the United States and Tokugawa Shogunate, which opened the ports of Kanagawa and four other Japanese cities to trade and granted extraterritoriality to foreigners, among a number of trading stipulations. It was signed on the deck of the USS Powhatan in Edo (now Tokyo) Bay on July 29, 1858.

== Timeline ==
- July 29, 1858: Treaty and Regulations are signed by the United States and Japan
- December 15, 1858: Senate reviews the treaty and consents to ratification
- March 19, 1859: Ratified by Japan
- July 4, 1859: Entered into force
- April 12, 1860: Ratified by the President of the United States
- May 22–23, 1860: Ratifications exchanged at Washington and proclaimed by the President
- June 25, 1866: Amended through convention
- July 25, 1878: Modified by convention
- July 17, 1899: Superseded by the treaty of November 22, 1894.

== The Treaty ==
The treaty followed the 1854 Convention of Kanagawa, which granted coaling rights for American merchant ships and allowed for a US Consul in Shimoda. Although Commodore Matthew Perry secured fuel for US ships and protection for US sailors, he left the important matter of trading rights to Townsend Harris, another US envoy who negotiated with the Tokugawa shogunate; the treaty is therefore often referred to as the "Harris Treaty". It took two years to break down Japanese resistance, but with the realization that demands for similar privileges would soon follow from other Western powers, the Tokugawa government eventually capitulated.

Among the most important points were:

- exchange of diplomatic agent
- in addition to the existing ports of Shimoda and Hakodate, the ports of Kanagawa and Nagasaki to be open to foreign trade effective 4 July 1859 and thereafter Niigata, and Hyōgo opened on 1 January 1860 and 1 January 1863 respectively
- in all the treaty ports listed, United States citizens may permanently reside, have the right to lease ground and purchase the buildings thereon, and may erect dwellings and warehouses
- a system of extraterritoriality that provided for the subjugation of foreign residents to the laws of their own consular courts instead of the Japanese legal system
- fixed low import-export duties, subject to international control
- right of freedom of religious expression and church construction to serve the needs of United States nationals within the confines of the designated foreign settlements at the treaty ports

The agreement served as a model for similar treaties signed by Japan with other foreign countries in the ensuing weeks. These Unequal Treaties curtailed Japanese sovereignty for the first time in its history; more importantly, it revealed Japan's growing weakness. The recovery of national status and strength became an overarching priority for the Japanese, with the treaty's domestic consequences being the end of Bakufu (Shōgun) control and the establishment of a new imperial government.

== American interests in Japan ==
Perry's expedition to Japan was theoretically linked to the notion of manifest destiny, in which American settlers had a "God-given" right to spread across North America. The role of Japan in particular was that of a base of commerce between China and the United States. According to US Secretary of State Daniel Webster, God had placed coal for steam ships and other trading vessels "in the depths of the Japanese islands for the benefit of the human family." The idea of "Manifest Destiny" as an imperialistic measure outside of North America was not introduced as a significant idea until the Republican bid for office in 1892, thereby suggesting, in practicality, a mere economic interest in Japan, as it held coal reserves in key locations for Pacific trade.

== Extension of the "Perry Crisis" ==
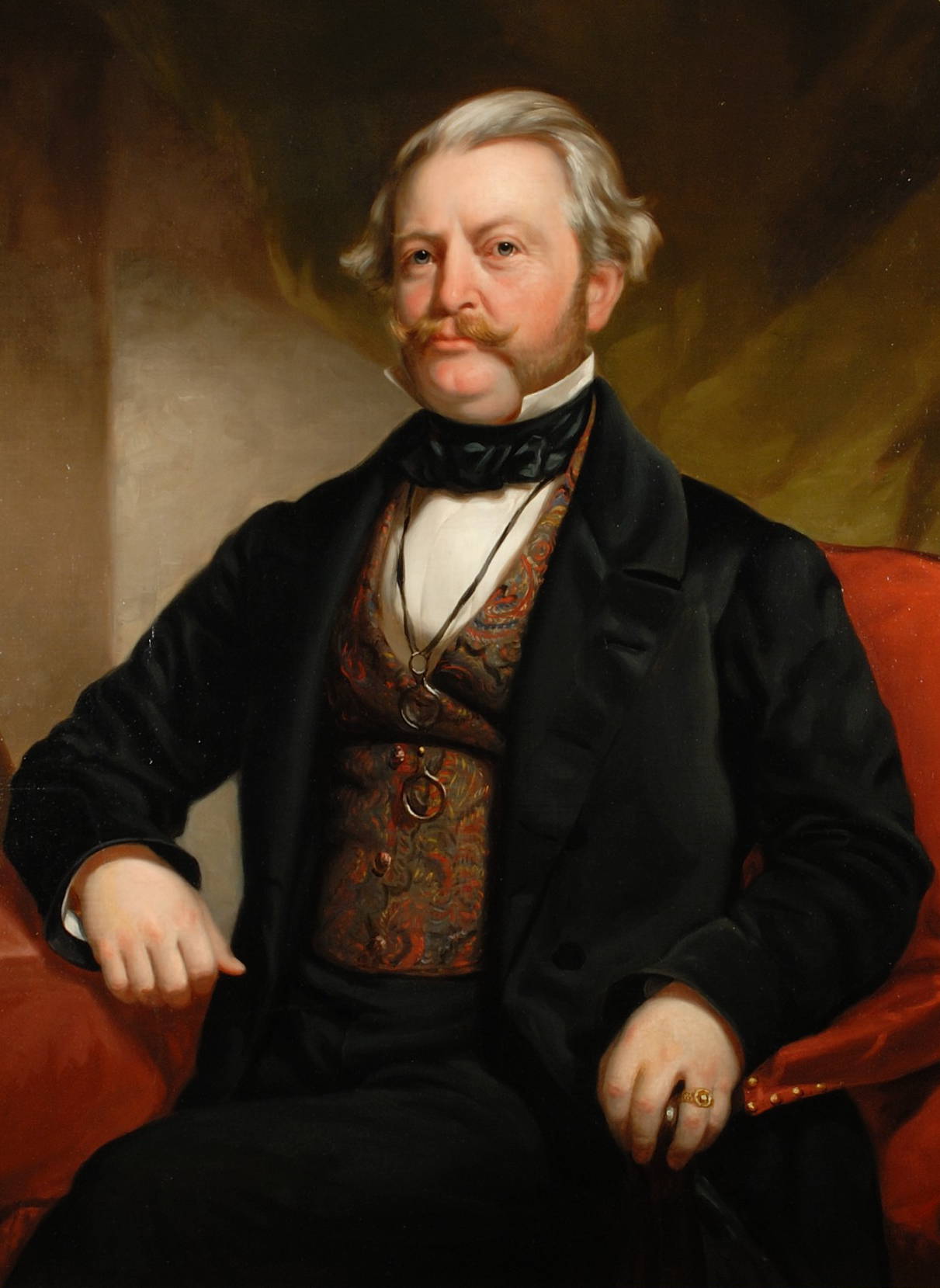
Townsend Harris negotiated the "Treaty of Amity and Commerce" (painted in 1855 by James Bogle).

The Convention of Kanagawa mediated by Commodore Perry was a primary step to a rather forced extension of American influence in Japan. However, most problems that the Tokugawa Shogunate faced came from a division within the country between those who favored opening to the West immediately (kaikoku) and advocates of joi ("expel the barbarian") who favored a preservation of Japanese culture and influence until Japan could face the military threat posed by the West. Most Japanese were familiar with the humiliating Chinese defeat in the First Opium War, but they were divided on how and when they would inevitably open their ports. Both camps did agree that trade should be handled by Japanese going overseas instead of foreigners coming into Japan and violating the country's seclusion laws. Many of those Tokugawan officials who agreed to the Treaty of Kanagawa did so in an effort to avoid war with the United States, whom they knew possessed a far superior military than anything found in Japan. The result was a deepening domestic crisis; after 1858, the Shogunate was trapped between the demands of the United States and its powerful domestic enemies.

However, Townsend Harris' terms were much more demanding than Perry's. Harris claimed that the laws of Japan were "very peculiar" and it would be unfair for foreigners to live under such rule. Article III of the treaty gave Americans the right to trade and reside in Yedo (Tokyo) and Osaka without influence from the Japanese government; the treaty also allowed for consular jurisdiction in those cities opened to American trade, the free export of Japanese gold and silver, and a conventional tariff. The entrance of foreigners to the port of Edo, the shogunal capital, and the placement of an official from a foreign government in proximity to the Emperor was threatening, even to those who supported opening to the West publicly. These demands in particular demonstrated the United States' planned role for Japan; there was to be freedom of trade, allowance for an influx of Americans, (but no expectations of Japanese coming to the United States), no interest in military concerns, and religious toleration of Japanese tradition. It was merely a link in a chain of commerce that would connect North America to China.

Harris' emphasis (and threat) of the inevitable defeat of the Japanese, who still proved reluctant to sign the treaty, by European powers was enough to convince many of the kaikoku members of the Tokugawa Shogunate to agree to the terms of the United States, no matter how unfavorable they were. The memory of China's overwhelming defeat was too recent to be ignored.

== Additional Treaties ==
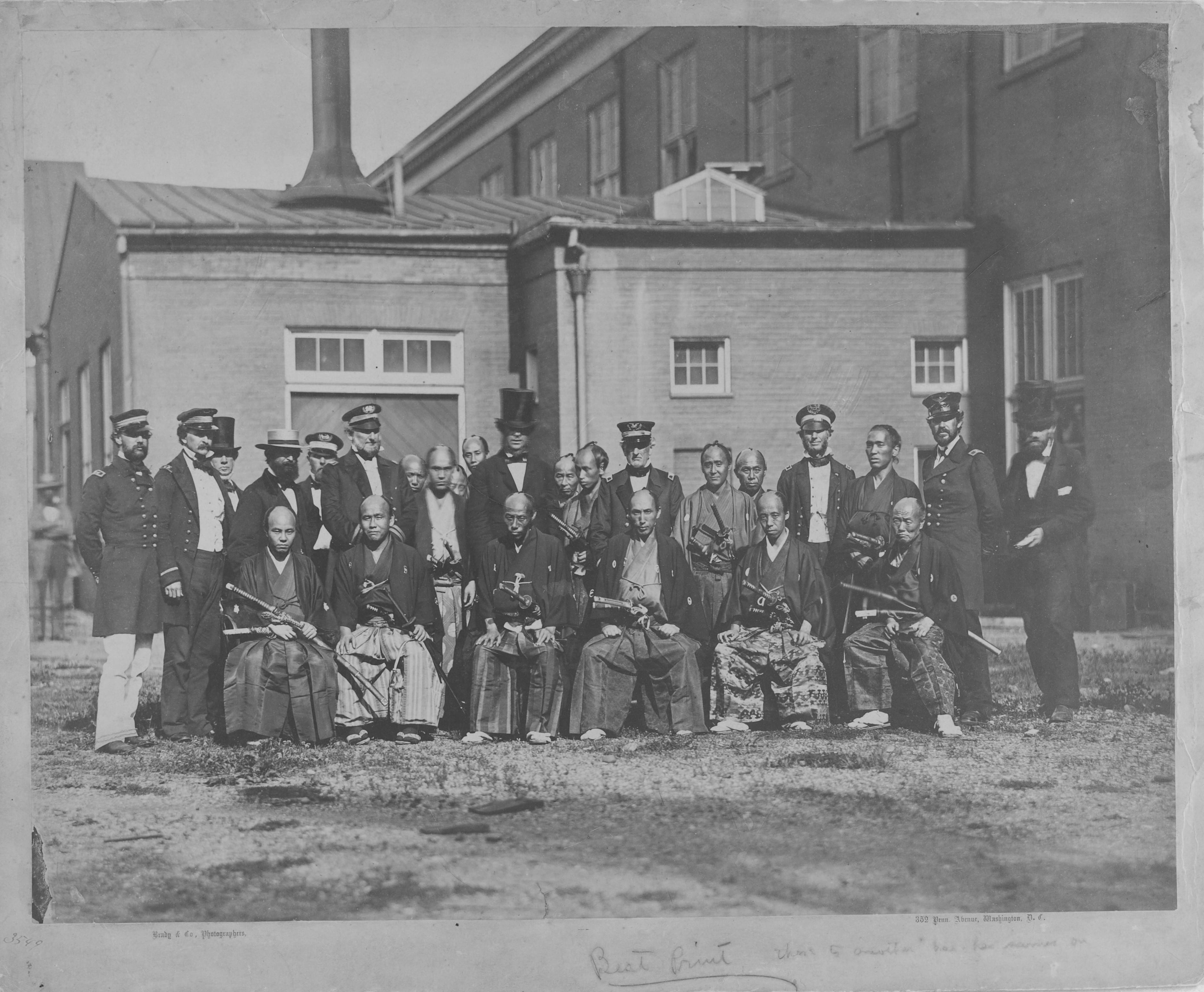
The 1860 Japanese mission to the U.S., photographed by Mathew Brady.

After reluctantly accepting the Harris Treaty, Japan quickly signed similar treaties, called the Ansei Treaties, with Russia, France, Britain, and the Netherlands. This process was hastened by the outcome of the Arrow War in 1858 in which the Chinese were once again soundly defeated by a European expeditionary force. Harris also suggested that Japan sign "honorable treaties" before the European powers would sail to Japan and coerce the signing of "unequal treaties". However, the content of the treaties signed between Japan and the United States did not differ in their most essential points from unequal treaties signed between China and Western nations.

== Ratification ==
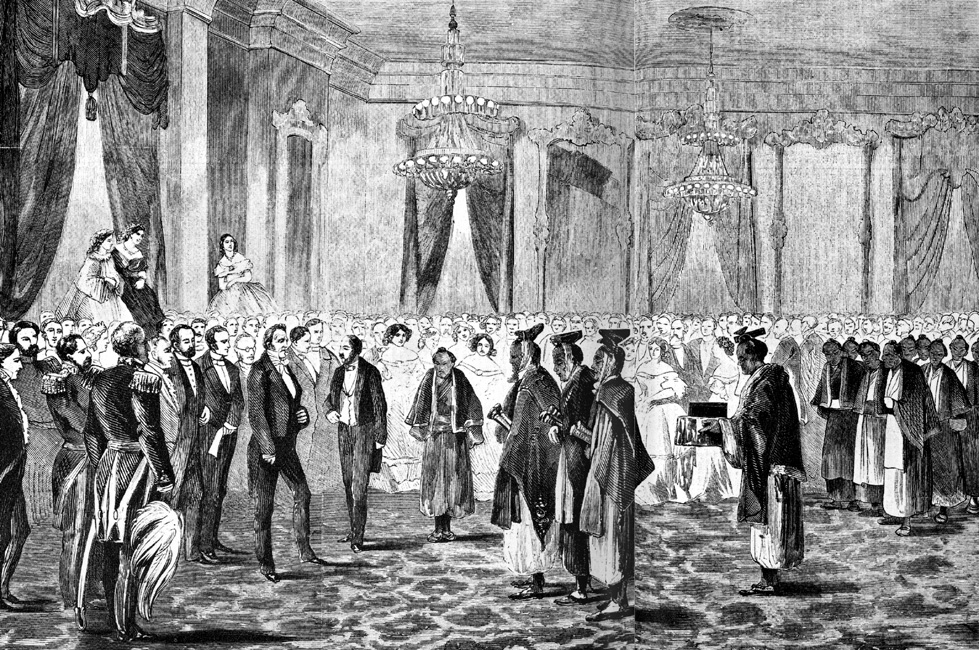
President James Buchanan welcomes the Japanese delegation at a White House gala celebrating the signing of the Treaty of Amity and Commerce.

The Treaty was ratified through the visit of the first Japanese Embassy to the United States in 1860. The new relationship with the United States has been cited as a factor in the assassination of Ii Naosuke. The Treaty was later superseded on July 17, 1899, by the Treaty of November 22, 1894, which is about the establishment of tariff duties with respect to Japan.

== Effects ==
According to a 2017 study, the treaties reducing trade barriers between Japan and Western powers caused the GDP to increase in Japan by 7 percent in the immediate period.

== See also ==
- Japan–United States relations
- History of Japanese foreign relations
- Hotta Masayoshi
- Convention of Kanagawa
- Gaikoku bugyō
- Sakoku
- Sakuradamon Incident
- Treaty ports

== Bibliography ==
- Anderson, David L. "Matthew C. Perry." American National Biography Vol. 17. New York: Oxford 1999, pp. 367–369.
- Auslin, Michael R. (2004). Negotiating with Imperialism: The Unequal Treaties and the Culture of Japanese Diplomacy. Cambridge: Harvard University Press. ISBN 978-0-674-01521-0; OCLC 56493769
- Griffis, William Elliott. Townsend Harris: First American Envoy in Japan. Cambridge, Massachusetts: Cambridge University Press, 1895.
- Heine, William. With Perry to Japan. Honolulu, Hawaii: University of Hawaii Press, 1990.
- LaFeber, Walter. The Clash. New York, New York: Norton & Co., 1997.
- McMaster, John. "Alcock and Harris, Foreign Diplomacy in Bakumatsu Japan". Monunmenta Nipponica, Vol. 22, No. 3–4 (1967), pp. 305–367.
- Miyauchi, D. Y. "Yokoi Shonan's Response to the Foreign Intervention in Late Tokugawa Japan, 1853–1862". Modern Asian Studies. Vol. 4, No. 3 (1970) pp. 269–290.
- Murase, Shinya. "The Most-Favored-Nation Treatment in Japan's Treaty Practice During the Period 1854–1905", The American Journal of International Law, Vol. 70, No. 2 (April, 1976), pp. 273–297.
- Totman, Conrad. "From Sakoku to Kaikoku, The Transformation of Foreign-Policy Attitudes, 1853–1868." Monumenta Nipponica. Vol. 35, No. 1 (1980), pp. 1–19.
- Totman, Conrad. The Collapse of the Tokugawa Bakufu 1862–1868. Honolulu, Hawaii: University Press of Hawaii, 1980.
- Schroeder, John H. Matthew Calbraith Perry: Antebellum Sailor and Diplomat. Annapolis, Maryland: Naval Institute Press, 2001.
