= Ii Naosuke =

Feudal lord and statesman in Tokugawa Japan (1814–1860)

Senior Fourth Rank, Upper Grade Ii Naosuke
- 井伊 直弼
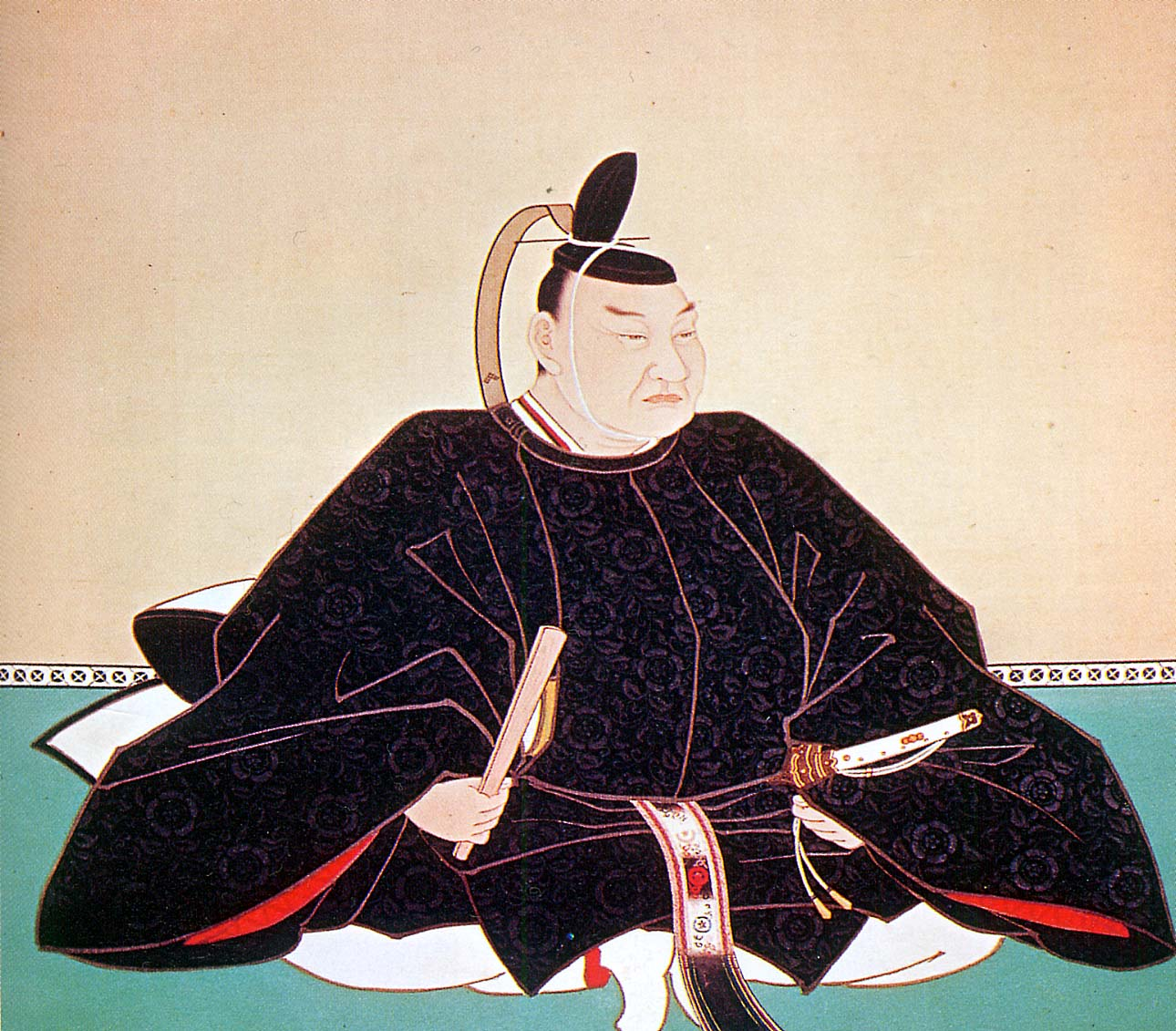

Lord of Hikone
- In office April 23, 1858 – March 24, 1860
- Preceded by: Ii Naoaki
- Succeeded by: Ii Naonori

Personal details
- Born: November 29, 1814 Edo, Japan
- Died: March 24, 1860 (aged 45) Edo, Japan

Ii Naosuke (井伊 直弼; November 29, 1814 – March 24, 1860) (Note: Ii with two "i"s) was a daimyō (feudal lord) of Hikone (1850–1860) and also Tairō of the Tokugawa shogunate, Japan, a position he held from April 23, 1858, until his assassination in the Sakuradamon Incident on March 24, 1860. He is most famous for signing the Harris Treaty with the United States, granting access to ports for trade to American merchants and seamen and extraterritoriality to American citizens. He was also an enthusiastic and accomplished practitioner of the Japanese tea ceremony, in the Sekishūryū style, and his writings include at least two works on the tea ceremony.

Under Ii Naosuke's guidance, the Tokugawa shogunate navigated past a particularly difficult conflict over the succession to the ailing and childless Tokugawa Iesada. Ii Naosuke managed to coerce the Tokugawa shogunate to the last brief resurgence of its power and position in Japanese society before the start of the Meiji period. Ii was assassinated in the Sakuradamon incident by a group of 17 Mito and 1 Satsuma samurai on March 24, 1860.

== Early life ==
Ii Naosuke was born on November 29, 1814, as the 14th son of Ii Naonaka, the daimyō of Hikone by his concubine. The Ii clan is a prestigious lineage with Naomasa, one of the Four Heavenly Kings of the Tokugawa, as its revitalizing founder. However, since Naosuke was the 14th son, he was not in line for a prominent position and was sent early in life to a Buddhist temple, where he lived on a small stipend from his family. Fortunately for Ii, even though he was sent to the monastery, his 13 elder brothers were either adopted into other families who needed an heir, or died before they succeeded their father. Accordingly, when his father died in 1850, Ii was called back from the monastery and became the daimyō of Hikone, a fudai domain, and took the family name of Ii. As the daimyō of Hikone, Ii was one of the daimyōs who were eligible for a position in the bakufu, the council of the shōgun's advisors. His childhood name was Tetsunosuke (鉄之介).

Ii became involved in national politics, rapidly rising to lead a coalition of daimyōs. In 1853 Ii put forward a proposal concerning the Japanese negotiations with U.S. Commodore Matthew C. Perry during Perry's mission to open Japan to the outside world. Realizing that Japan was faced with immediate military danger Ii argued that Japan should use their relationship with the Dutch to allow them to buy enough time to develop armed forces, which could resist invasion. Ii recommended that only the port of Nagasaki be opened for trade with foreigners Ii, like Hotta Masayoshi, refused to remain silent while shogunal advisor Abe Masahiro appeased the anti-foreign party. Ii led the fudai daimyōs in their effort to bring about the downfall of Abe Masahiro and replace him with Hotta Masayoshi. This alienated many reformist daimyōs, leading them to strengthen their association with the Imperial court.

== Family ==
- Father: Ii Naonaka (1766–1831)
- Mother: Otomi no Kata (1785–1819)
- Foster father: Ii Naoaki (1794–1850)
- Wife: Masako (1834–1885)
- Concubines:
  - Senda Shizue
  - Nishimura Sato
- Children:
  - Ii Naonori by Nishimura Sato
  - daughter
  - Son
  - Chiyoko (1846–1927) married Matsudaira Yoritoshi
  - Ii Naotomo (1849–1887) by Masako
  - Ii Naoyasu (1851–1935) by Nishimura Sato
  - daughter
  - son
  - Manchiyo
  - daughter
  - son
  - Michiyo
  - daughter
  - Ii Naoyuki (1858–1927) by Masako
  - Tokiko married Aoyama Yukiyoshi

== Tairō ==
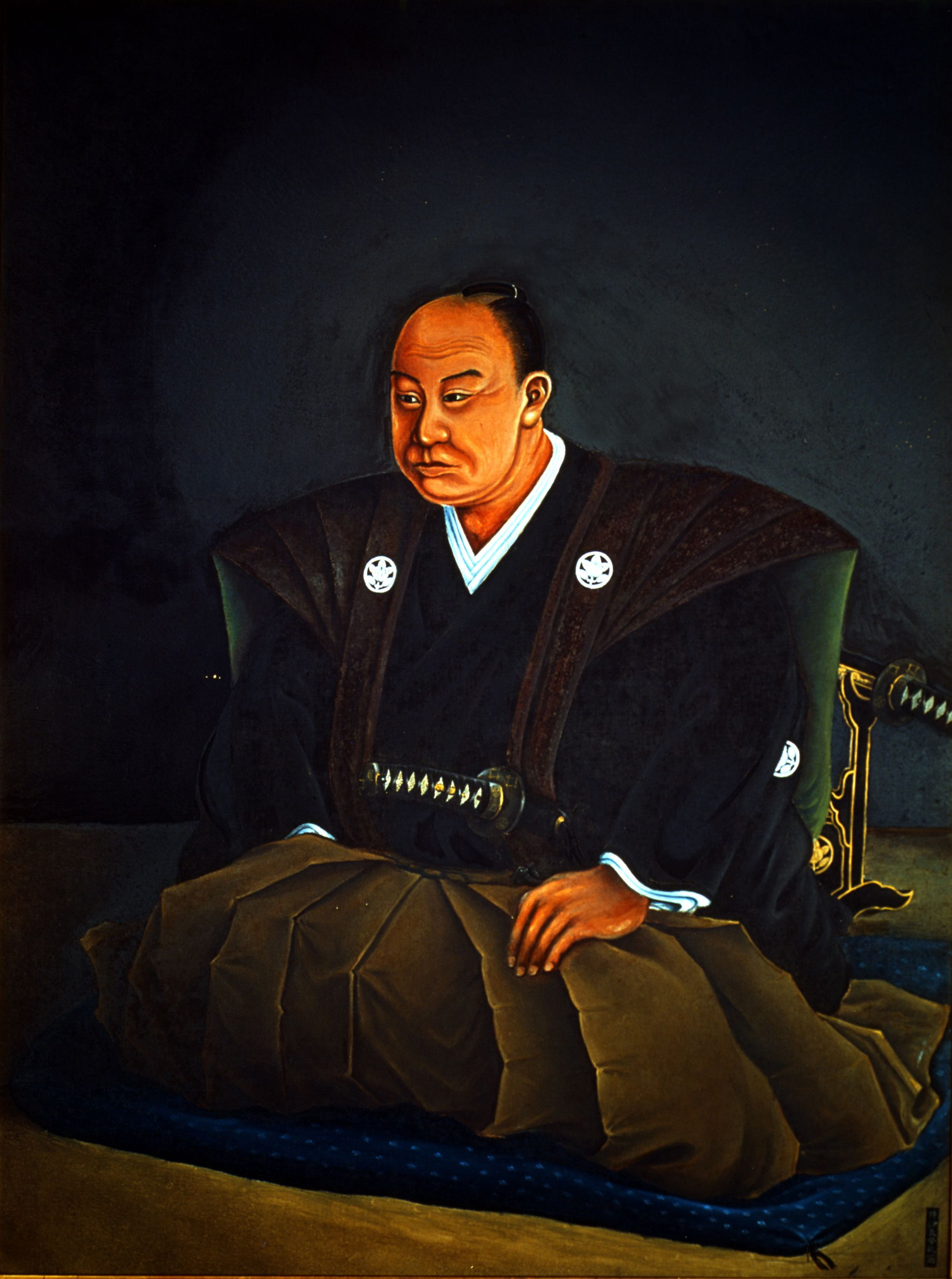
Portrait of Ii Naosuke, painted by his third son Ii Naoyasu. Echigo Province Yoita Domain 10th lord) Gotokuji (Setagaya-ku, Tokyo). Setagaya-ku designated tangible cultural property (historical material)

In 1858 after Hotta Masayoshi's disastrous attempt to obtain the emperor's approval for the Harris treaty the Tokugawa shōgun Tokugawa Iesada chose Ii Naosuke to be the Tairō (Great Elder); a decision influenced by the Kii Party. The position of Tairō, a post traditionally held by members of the Ii family, was rarely filled; in fact there had only been three Tairō between 1700 and Ii Naosuke's rise to power 158 years later. Ii's promotion to the post of Tairō annoyed many of the shinpan daimyōs (daimyōs related to the shōgun, they were unable to be members of the bakufu, but in the event of the shōgun dying heirless the next shōgun would be chosen from one of the shinpan families) including Tokugawa Nariaki. As the Tairō Ii Naosuke had both prestige and power second only to the shōgun; Ii also enjoyed the full backing of the fudai daimyōs. An intelligent and capable politician Ii Naosuke was determined to restore the power of the bakufu in Japanese policy making, both in a domestic and a foreign role.

Ii Naosuke regarded the Harris treaty, which Hotta Masayoshi had negotiated with the American envoy Townsend Harris as in Japan's best interests. In accordance with the protocol he asked the three house lords of the gosankyō for their views in writing. However Ii faced a problem in the form of an obstructionist policy from members of the Hitotsubashi faction led by Hitotsubashi Keiki's father Tokugawa Nariaki.

Ii was unwilling to sign the Harris treaty without approval from Emperor Kōmei in Kyoto. However the daimyōs of the Hitotsubashi faction were preventing him from presenting the treaty to the emperor by withholding their approval. At this time Harris started putting pressure on the shogunal officials to sign the treaty. Ii decided not to risk aggravating the Americans and on July 29, 1858, encouraged by the full backing of the bakufu officials, Ii ordered the Harris treaty to be signed. Soon after this Ii negotiated a number of similar unequal treaties with the Dutch, the Russians, the British and the French. Bakufu critics considered the treaties signed by Ii Naosuke to have seriously compromised Japan's sovereignty, and recovery of this power became the basis of a large part of the policies formed during the Meiji period.

Due to the frail health of the shōgun Tokugawa Iesada, the members of the Hitotsubashi faction wanted to force Ii to support Hitotsubashi Keiki as the heir to the ailing shōgun. Hitotsubashi Keiki was the reformist candidate, supported by the reformist faction, headed by his father Tokugawa Nariaki; his supporters pointed to his experience and skill in handling policy decisions. Ii was aware that Japan needed strong leadership, but unlike the reformist daimyōs, Ii was not prepared to accept strong leadership from outside the traditional forms of government. The bakufu, led by Ii, wanted the 12-year-old daimyō of Kii, Tokugawa Yoshitomi, to ascend to the position of shōgun. The bakufu supported such a young candidate because they felt that it would be easier for them to influence and control a young and inexperienced shōgun.

To end meddling in bakufu affairs, shortly after he signed the Harris treaty Ii settled the matter of the shogunal succession by claiming that the shogunal succession was a matter for the Tokugawa house alone and neither the shinpan daimyōs nor the Emperor had the right to interfere. As head councilor of the Tokugawa house Ii was now free to influence the decision in favor of whichever candidate he preferred without any interference. In this way Ii was able to ignore the daimyōs who supported Hitotsubashi Keiki, the reformist candidate for the office of shōgun and crowned the fudai daimyō's candidate, Tokugawa Yoshitomi who changed his name to Tokugawa Iemochi, as the 14th Tokugawa shōgun.

Ii's decision made him very unpopular with Imperial loyalists, especially with the Mito samurai. Towards the end of 1858 the reformists went to the emperor with the hopes of restraining Ii. In response to the attempt by Tokugawa Nariaki and his supporters to denounce him in the emperor's court Ii had a shogunal decree passed which allowed him to conduct the Ansei Purge. During the rest of 1858 and into 1859 Naosuke purged over 100 officials from the bakufu, the imperial court and the lands of various daimyōs. Eight of the officials who were purged were executed; the remainder were forced into retirement. During the Ansei purge Ii Naosuke was able to force Hitotsubashi Keiki's supporters to retire and place Hitotsubashi and his family under house arrest. Ii Naosuke was also able to remove officials who had expressed unhappiness with his handling of the Harris treaty and the shogunal succession from public life.

== Kōbu gattai and the Kazunomiya marriage ==
In early 1859 Ii Naosuke's agent in the Imperial Court, Nagano Shuzen, approached him with the idea of kōbu gattai. Kōbu gattai was a policy binding Kyoto and Edo closer together to shore up the failing shogunate with the prestige of the imperial court. This policy was to be carried out by means of a marriage between the shōgun and the Emperor's younger sister, Princess Kazunomiya. Naosuke broached the topic to the Imperial court through his Envoy Manabe Akibuke. Manabe was tasked with gauging the measure of acceptability for the proposed marriage between Shogun Iemochi and Princess Kazunomiya. Prominent court official Konoe Tadahiro responded favorably to the proposal, insinuating a marriage between the shogun and Princess Kazunomiya was possible if her present engagement failed. However, in March 1859 Konoe was forced to retire from the court by Naosuke's Ansei purge, and the idea of kōbu gattai faded into the background until 1861, after the death of Ii Naosuke. In 1861 due to the further deteriorating status of the shogunate the marriage between Tokugawa Iemochi and Princess Kazunomiya finally took place, though their marriage was cut short by Iemochi's death in 1866.

== Death and consequences ==
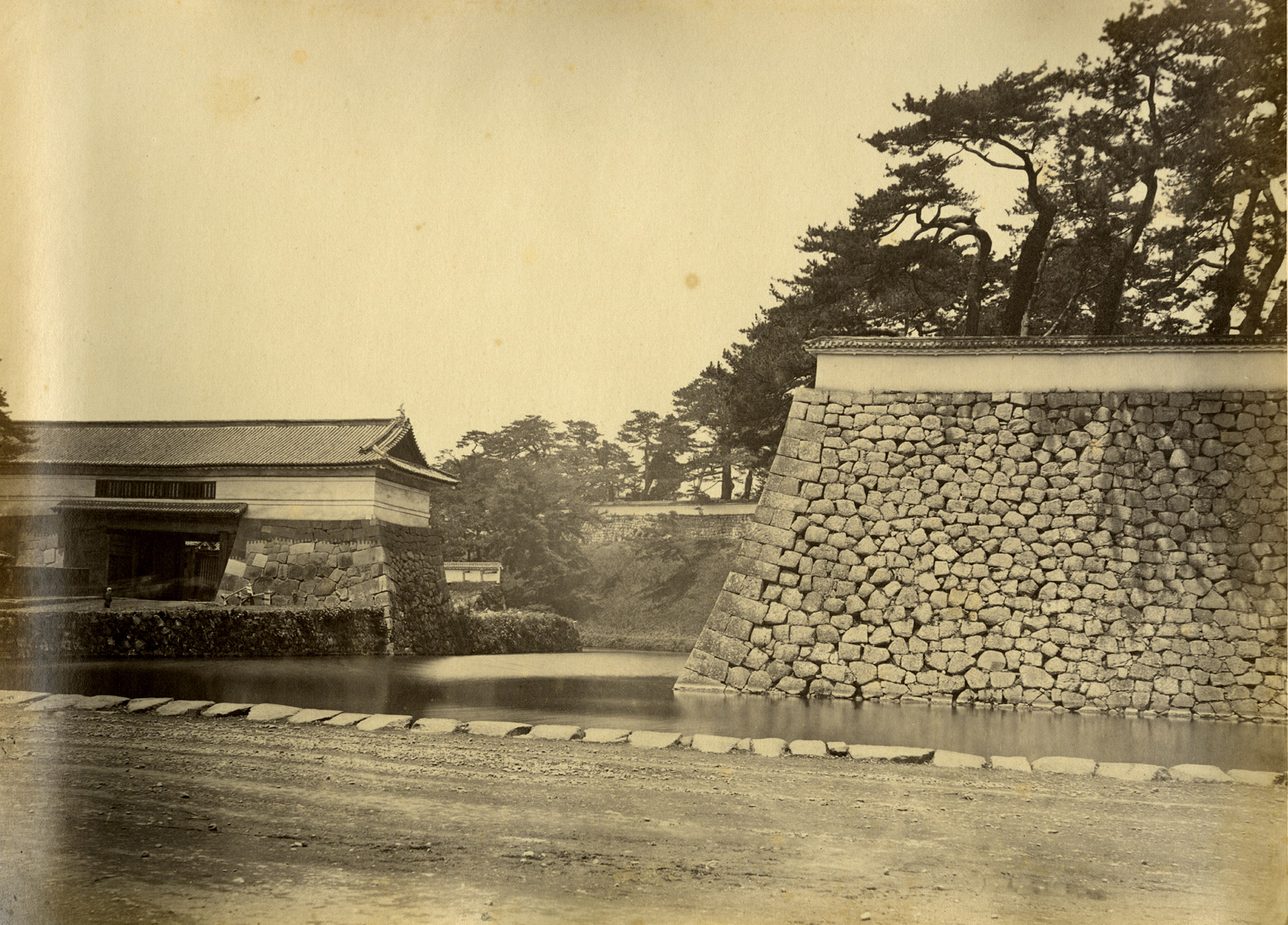
Edo Castle's Sakurada Gate (Sakurada-mon) – photographed by Felice Beato, 1863–1870

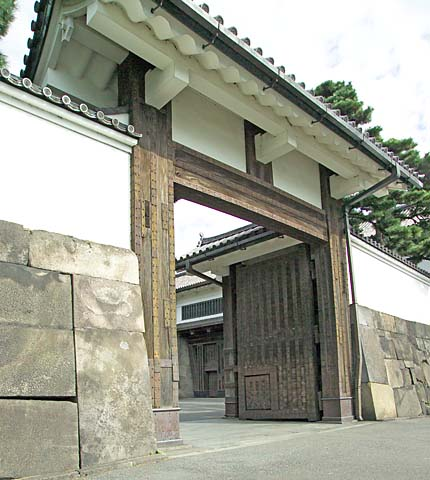
Edo Castle's Sakurada Gate (Sakurada-mon) – the location chosen by Ii Naosuke's assassins for their attack in Ansei 7 (March 1860)

Although Ii's Ansei purge was very effective in silencing the officials and his high ranking opponents, it did not have the same effect on lower-ranking samurai. Ii Naosuke's 20-month dictatorial reign as tairō came to an abrupt end in the third month of Ansei 7 (March 24, 1860).

In the Sakuradamon incident, Ii was attacked by a band of 17 young samurai loyalists from the Mito Province and cut down just in front of one of the gates of the shōgun's Edo castle entering to meet with the shōgun. The assassination of Ii Naosuke, who was seen as the symbol of the bakufu's power and authority, was construed as crushing any hopes for the resurrection of the shogunate's power. His assassins additionally left a note accusing him of building heretical Buddhist temples in Japan; this in fact referred to his allowing Christianity to return to the region, building on earlier Japanese heresiological discourse.

The death of Tairō Ii Naosuke started a wave of loyalist terrorism across Japan, the poet Tsunoda Tadayuki even wrote a poem praising Ii's assassins. Soon attempts were being made on the lives of other members of the bakufu and their informants. The wave of popular dissent also turned against officials with a connection to Ii Naosuke, no matter how distant it was. Shimada Sakon, retainer of the Kujō, (one of the Sekke families; the 5 regent houses, and among the most powerful in the court), Imperial regent, was killed by dissidents for supporting the Harris treaty and helping Ii's confidant, Nagano Shuzen, expose members of the court who were targeted during the Ansei purge.

The shōgun and the Bakufu were astounded and taken completely off-guard by the death of Ii Naosuke. They didn't even announce his death until several months after the assassination took place. Instead, during this time the shōgun and the bakufu first pretended that Ii was still alive and rendering service to the shōgun. Then they faked an illness and had him render his resignation to the shōgun before announcing his death. In this way Ii continued to serve the shōgun, even after death. Ii's assassins were later granted a general amnesty by the bakufu, a precedent later used by Yamagata Aritomo, a key member of the Meiji restoration and a main architect of the military and political foundations of early modern Japan and Japanese militarism, to show that any action can be forgiven if it is performed for the betterment of the emperor.

Accounts of the dramatic event were sent via ship across the Pacific to San Francisco and then sped by Pony Express across the American West. On June 12, The New York Times reported that Japan's first diplomatic mission to the West received the news about what had happened in Edo.

== Legacy ==
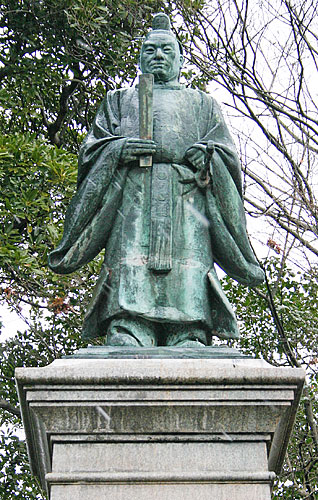
Statue of Ii Naosuke at the grounds of Hikone Castle

After his death, Ii Naosuke was quickly both vilified and defended. Even his enemies would admit that, along with Tokugawa Nariaki, Ii was one of the most important political figures of the late Edo period of Japanese history. Due to the often-tyrannical means Ii used to maintain his power, he was the subject of extremely negative press and was portrayed as a villain in much of the literature from his time, for example in the poems of Tsunada Tadayuki. Historians such as Miyauchi and Beasley consider that Ii was nonetheless a patriot who carried out all of his acts in the belief that they were for the good of Japan and the Emperor. They base this theory upon Ii's 1853 proposal concerning the Japanese negotiations with Commodore Perry, where Ii realized that Japan could not stand up to the Western powers and therefore suggested a policy of placation while the Japanese built up their armed forces (which was the policy chosen by the Meiji government). Ii's successors could not overturn his policy decisions, and his attitude towards the foreigners became the cornerstone of Japanese policy well into the Meiji period.

After Ii Naosuke's death, the Ii family was disgraced for many years; recently, however, Ii's actions have been looked at in a more favorable light and Ii Naosuke has taken his place as one of the most important political figures of Japanese history. On October 7, 2009, Ii Naotake, a family descendant of Naosuke, attended a memorial ceremony with the people of Fukui in reconciliation over the execution of Hashimoto Sanai in the Ansei Purge.

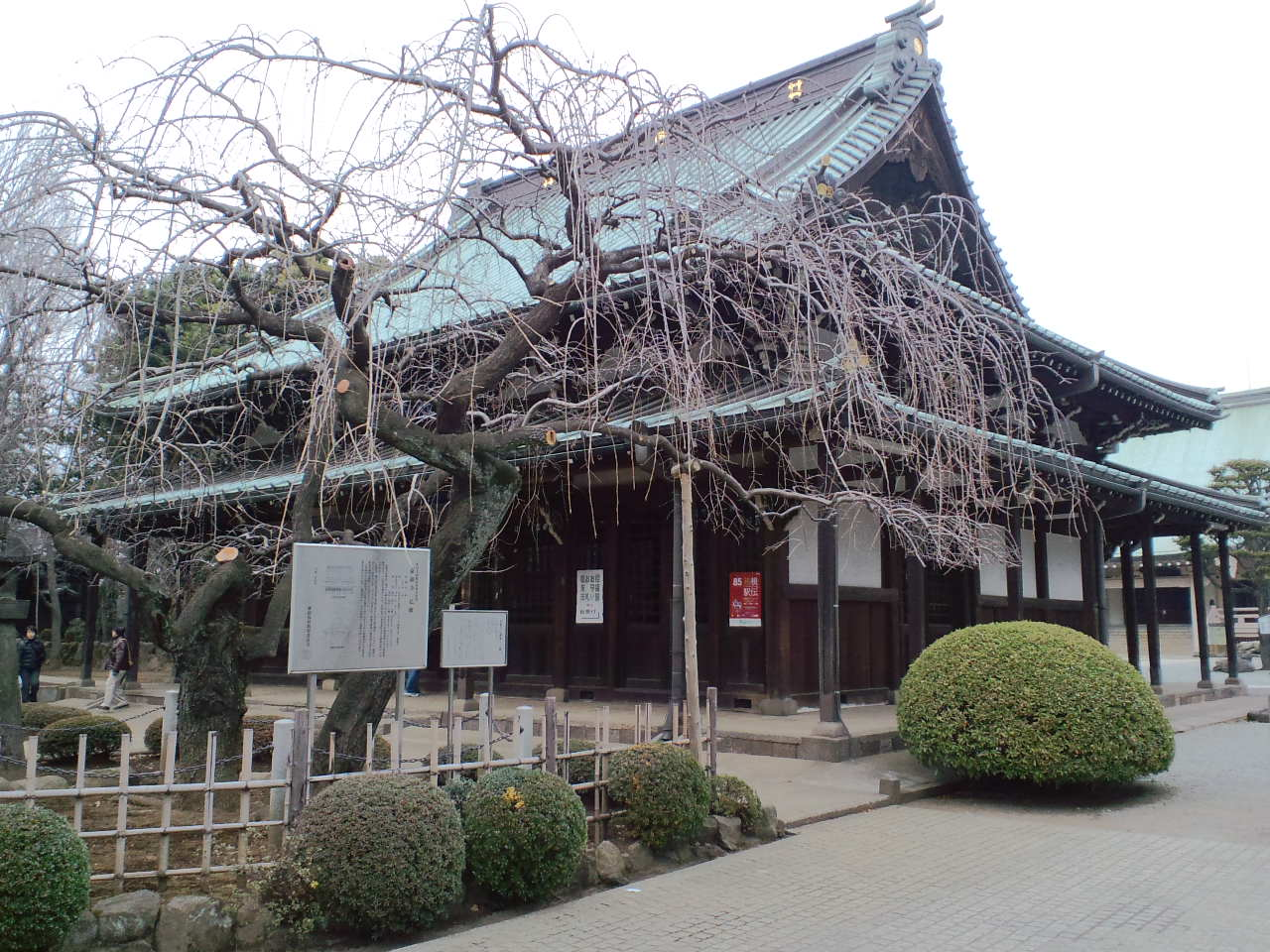
Gōtoku-ji, burial place

Ii is buried in the temple of Gōtoku-ji, in Setagaya, Tokyo.

== Notes ==
Preceded by Ii Naoaki	15th Lord of Hikone (Ii); 1846–1860	Succeeded by Ii Naonori
Preceded by Ii Naoaki	12th Tairō of the Tokugawa Shogunate; 1858–1860	Succeeded by Sakai Tadashige
