= Harima Chūbu Kyūryō Prefectural Natural Park =

Natural park of Hyogo prefecture, Japan

- 播磨中部丘陵県立自然公園
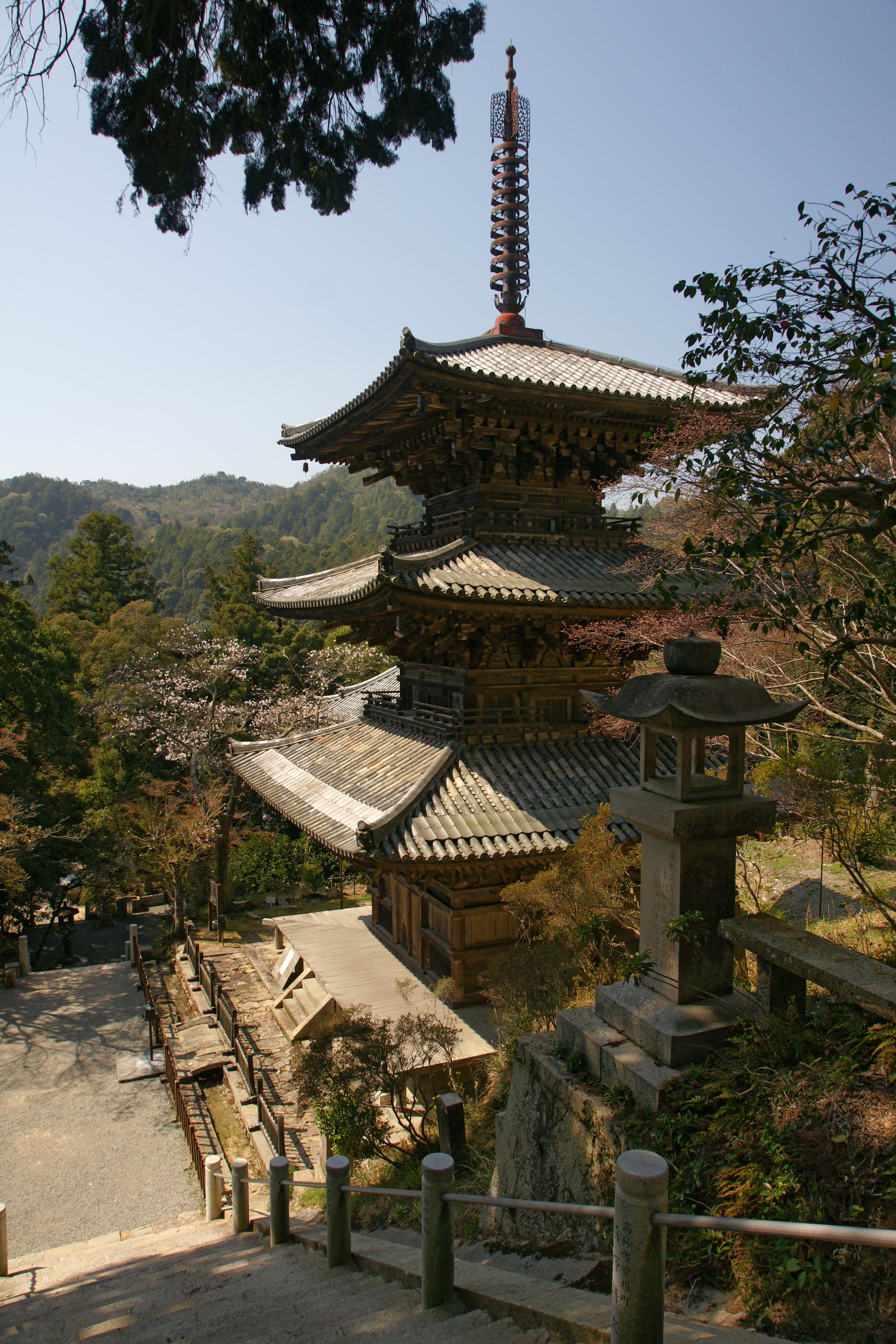
- Ichijō-ji

- Location within Hyōgo Prefecture Location within Japan
- Location: Hyōgo Prefecture, Japan
- Coordinates: 34.84028°N 134.89647°E
- Area: 58.95 km^{2} (22.76 sq mi)
- Established: 30 March 1961

Harima Chūbu Kyūryō Prefectural Natural Park (播磨中部丘陵県立自然公園, Harima Chūbu Kyūryō kenritsu shizen kōen) is a Prefectural Natural Park in southern Hyōgo Prefecture, Japan. Established in 1961, the park spans the municipalities of Himeji, Kakogawa, Kasai, and Ono.

== See also ==
- National Parks of Japan
