= Sakakibara =

Sakakibara (Japanese: 榊原) is a Japanese surname. Notable people with the surname include:

- Sakakibara Kenkichi (榊原 鍵吉, 1830–1894), a Japanese samurai and martial artist
- Nobuyuki Sakakibara, a Japanese businessman and mixed martial arts promoter
- Seito Sakakibara, alias of the perpetrator of the Kobe child murders
- Yui Sakakibara, a Japanese voice actress
- Yoshiko Sakakibara (born 1956), a Japanese voice actress
- Ikue Sakakibara (born 1959), a Japanese singer
- Sakakibara Yasumasa (榊原 康政, 1548–1606), a Japanese daimyō
- Saya Sakakibara (born 1999), a Japanese Australian cyclist

== Fictional characters ==
- Shiho Sakakibara, a Japanese manga/anime character in Oh My Goddess!
- Kōichi Sakakibara, a Japanese manga/anime character in Another
- Kōichi Sakakibara, a Japanese tokusatsu character in Kamen Rider Ryuki Special: 13 Riders

== See also ==
- Sakakibara clan, a samurai family in Edo-period Japan
- Sakakibara-Onsenguchi Station
