= Honda Tadatoki =

Japanese daimyo

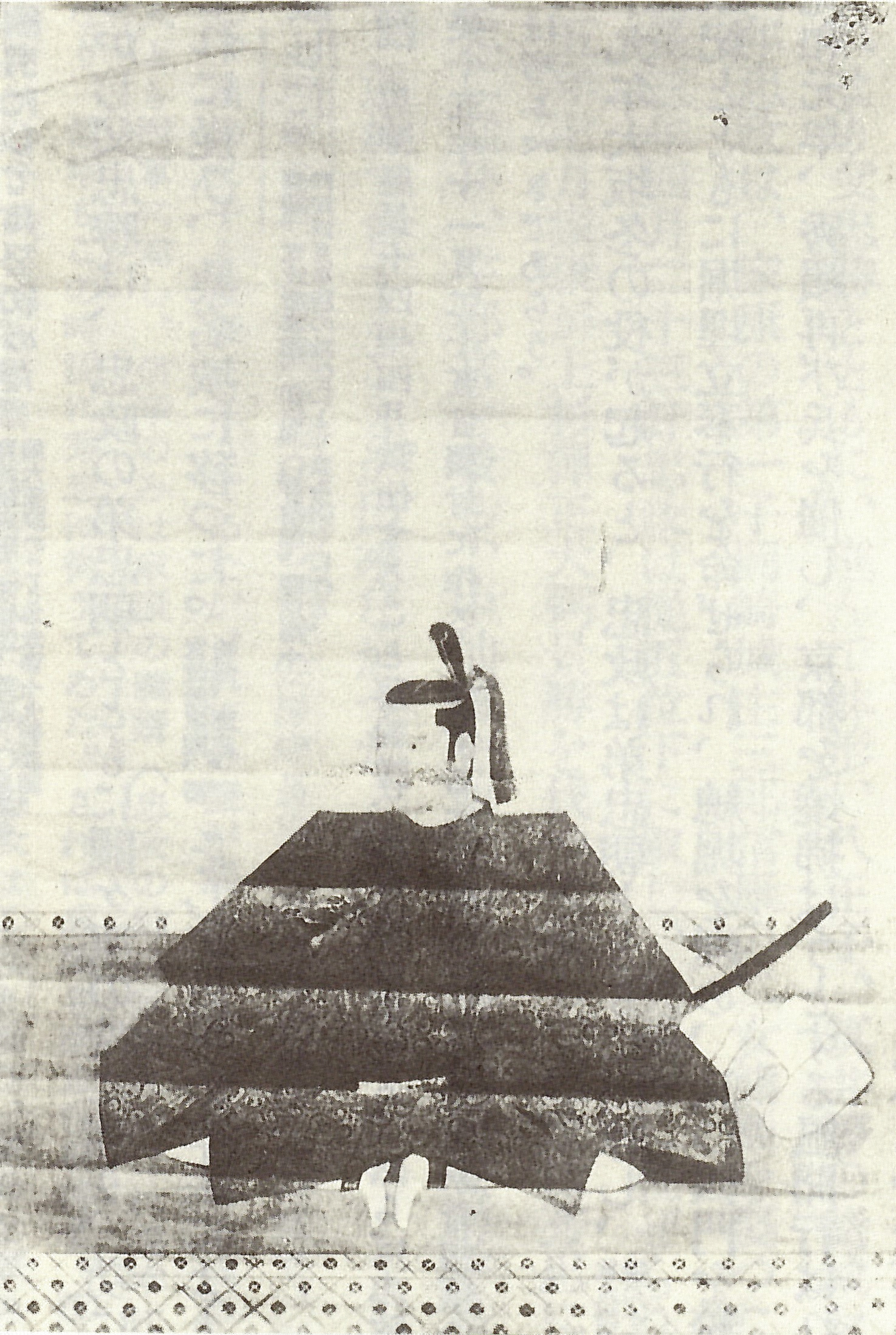

1st Lord of Himeji-Shinden
- In office 1617–1626
- Preceded by: none
- Succeeded by: Honda Masatomo

Personal details
- Born: May 11, 1596
- Died: June 30, 1626 (aged 30)
- Spouse: Senhime

Honda Tadatoki (本多 忠刻; May 11, 1596 – June 30, 1626) was a Japanese daimyō of the early Edo period.

Tadatoki was born as the eldest son of Honda Tadamasa. His mother Kumahime was a granddaughter of Tokugawa Ieyasu and Oda Nobunaga.

In 1616, Tadatoki married Senhime, another granddaughter of Ieyasu, and who had been married to Toyotomi Hideyori before Hideyori's death the Siege of Osaka. As a dowry of his new bride, Tadatoki received 100,000 koku.

Tadatoki also sponsored the swordsman Miyamoto Musashi for a time. Musashi taught swordsmanship to Tadatoki's retainers; Musashi's adopted son Mikinosuke served Tadatoki as a page.

Tadatoki died of tuberculosis in 1626. Miyamoto Mikinosuke committed junshi soon afterward, choosing to follow his lord in death

== Family ==
- Father: Honda Tadamasa (1575–1631)
- Mother: Kumahime
- Wife: Senhime (1597–1666)
- Children:
  - Katsuhime (b. 1618), married Ikeda Mitsumasa
  - Kochiyo (1619–1621)

Preceded by none	1st Lord of Himeji-Shinden; 1617–1626	Succeeded by Honda Masatomo
