= Niki Mitsunaga =

Samurai lord

Niki Mitsunaga 仁木満長
- Born: Unknown
- Died: Unknown, after 1396
- Occupation: samurai lord
- Father: Niki Yoshinaga

Niki Mitsunaga (仁木 満長) was a Japanese samurai lord of the late Nanboku-chō and early Muromachi period. He was the Governor of Ise Province (1390-1396).

== Life ==
Niki Mitsunaga was born as the son of Governor of Ise Province Niki Yoshinaga of the Nitsuki clan (also known as Niki clan). After Yoshinaga's elder brother Niki Yoriaki became a steward of the Ashikaga shogunate, aided by his political power, the Nitsukis simultaneously served as governors of nine provinces in the early Nanboku-chō period. However, after 1372, when Tajima Province was taken over by the Yamana clan, the Nitsukis lost all their provinces.

In 1390, Mitsunaga was appointed as Governor of Ise Province after the Toki clan was deposed by Ashikaga Yoshimitsu due to the Mino Rebellion.

However, in July 1396, his illegitimate elder brother Niki Yoshikazu took the position over, forcing Mitsunaga to leave the political scene. Shortly after this, he was reported to have become a fugitive and gone missing in Ise Province and his fate remains unknown. This shift in power was a conspiracy plotted by Yoshikazu's close retainer, Yūki Mitsufuji. Enraged by this, the Shugo Daimyo approached Yoshikazu and had Mitsufuji exiled.

== Genealogy ==
The Nitsuki clan descended from Emperor Seiwa (850-881) through the Seiwa Genji, the most successful and powerful line of the Minamoto clan, via the Ashikaga clan.

Although Mitsunaga's descendants did not become Governors, they survived as what became known as the Ise Nitsuki family.
