= Yūki Mitsufuji =

Yūki Mitsufuji 結城満藤
- Born: Unknown; Tango Province, Japan
- Died: Unknown, after 1403
- Other names: Yūki Jyūrō; Kageyu Saemon no Jō
- Occupation: samurai lord

Yūki Mitsufuji (結城 満藤) was a Japanese samurai lord of the Muromachi period. He served as Governor of Yamashiro Province (1394-1403) and Governor of Echigo Province under the Ashikaga shogunate.

== Life ==
Yūki Mitsufuji was born in Tango Province. His family descended from the Furuyama clan. He was also known as Yūki Jyūrō and Kageyu Saemon no Jō. Mitsufuji became a retainer of shogun Ashikaga Yoshimitsu and began his service under the Ashikaga shogunate.

In 1394, he was appointed as Governor of Yamashiro Province. As a governor, he acted self‐indulgently and violently while abusing Yoshimitsu's favor, and was repulsed by other daimyo. He is seen as the Governor of Yamashiro Province until 1403.

In July 1396, Mitsufuji, a close retainer of Niki Yoshikazu, plotted a conspiracy against Governor of Ise Province Niki Mitsunaga. Mitsufuji helped Yoshikazu, who was the illegitimate elder brother of Mitsunaga, take over the position of Governor of Ise Province. This forced Mitsunaga to leave the political scene, who was later reported to have gone missing in Ise Province. Enraged by this, the Shugo Daimyo approached Yoshikazu and had Mitsufuji exiled. His life after this remains unknown.

== See also ==
- Niki Mitsunaga
- Ashikaga Yoshimitsu
