= Nitsuki clan =

Japanese Daimyos family (Niki clan)

Nitsuki 仁木
- Mon: Ashikaga-Futatsu-Hikiryō
- Home province: Mikawa Province
- Parent house: Ashikaga clan
- Titles: Shugo Daimyo
- Founder: Nitsuki Sanekuni
- Founding year: 13th century
- Cadet branches: Sakakibara clan

The Nitsuki clan (仁木氏, Nitsuki-shi) was a Japanese family of Daimyos descending from the Seiwa Genji lineage of the Minamoto clan. The clan is also known as the Niki clan.

A branch of the powerful Ashikaga clan, the clan were active as Shugo Daimyo during the Nanboku-chō and Muromachi periods. During the Ōnin War (1467–77), the clan split into Tamba, Ise and Iga branches and gradually declined. In the Edo period, some branches of the Nitsuki clan, such as the Sakakibara clan, served the Tokugawa shogunate.

== Origin ==
The clan descends from Emperor Seiwa (850–881) through the Seiwa Genji, the most successful and powerful line of the Minamoto clan. Furthermore, they descended from the Ashikaga branch of the Seiwa Genji, a prominent samurai clan that would later establish the Ashikaga shogunate. During the Kamakura period, Ashikaga Yoshiyasu's great-grandson, Sanekuni, lived in Nitsuki, Nukata, Mikawa Province (present-day Nikki-chō, Okazaki, Aichi Prefecture), and became known as Nitsuki Tarō, thus establishing the Nitsuki clan.

== History ==
=== Nanboku-chō period ===
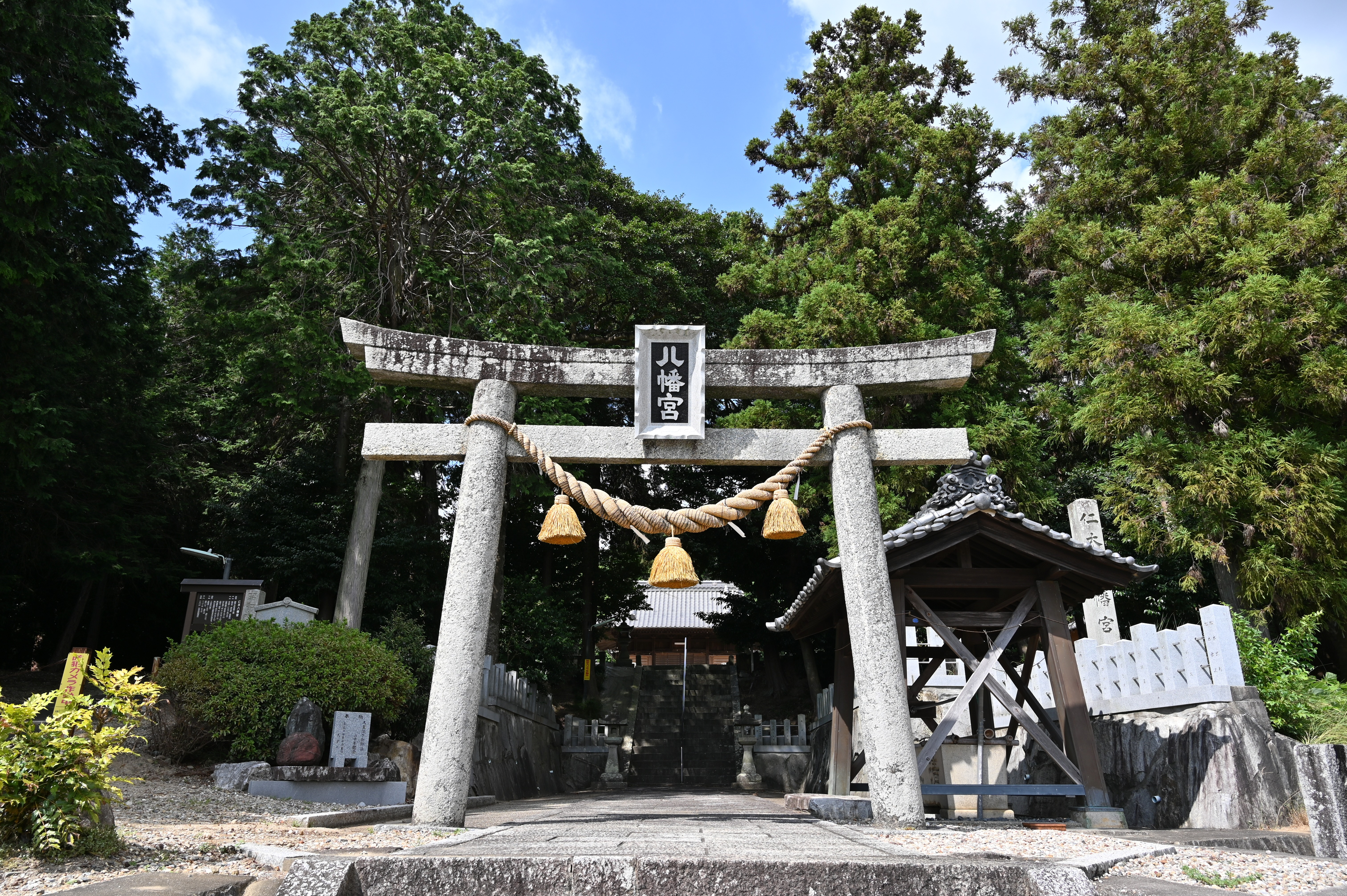
Nikki Hachimangu Shrine in Nikki-chō, Okazaki, Aichi

During the Nanboku-chō period, the brothers Nitsuki Yoriaki and Yoshinaga, who were sixth generation descendants of Sanekuni, provided military service to shogun Ashikaga Takauji. In 1351, Yoriaki became a steward to Takauji and held the office until Takauji's death in 1358. Aided by Yoriaki's political power, the Nitsukis simultaneously served as governors of nine provinces in the early Nanboku-chō period: Yoriaki became the Governor of Tamba and Musashi Provinces, and Yoshinaga became the Governor of Totomi, Ise, Iga, and Mikawa Provinces. However, after 1372, when Tajima Province was taken over by the Yamana clan, the Nitsukis lost all their provinces.

=== Muromachi period ===
In the Muromachi period, Nitsuki Mitsunaga was the Governor of Ise Province, and Nitsuki Yoshikazu was the Governor of Izumi, under Ashikaga Yoshimitsu. In 1360, Nitsuki Yoshinaga confronted Hosokawa Kiyouji and Hatakeyama Kunikiyo, but eventually retreated to Ise Province and later returned to the shogunate. Yoshinaga's descendants became the Governors of Ise and Iga Provinces, but the clan was divided during the Ōnin War (1467–77).

The clan was divided into three branches: Tamba, Ise, and Iga. While Tamba Nitsuki and Ise Nitsuki held their residences in the capital Kyoto, Iga Nitsuki always lived in their native Iga Province. As the names suggest, it is presumed that Tamba Nitsuki was based in Sogabe, Tamba Province, and Ise Nitsuki held the territory of Yada Uebayashi, Tamba Province in addition to Ise Province. It is said that Iga Nitsuki held hereditary succession of the position of Governor of Iga Province and retained their influence in Kitani (Ahai and Yamada) in Iga Province.

Since Iga Nitsuki does not appear in the Nitsuki genealogy, it is unknown which lineage the branch belongs to. Kōji Yoshii and Noriaki Inamoto have speculated that Iga Nitsuki may belong to the lineages of Yoriaki, Yorinatsu, and Yoshinori from their official names (kandona). Kenji Imaoka has speculated that the branch may belong to Yoshinaga's family from the clan name Dobashi.

=== Ōnin War ===
During the Ōnin War, Tamba Nitsuki Narinaga fought for the eastern army, and Ise Nitsuki Norimasa fought for the western army. In addition, Iga Nitsuki was accompanying Ashikaga Yoshimi during his return in 1468. In 1477, Iga Nitsuki attacked Yamashiro Province, and fought Hatakeyama Yoshinari of the western army at Kizu Castle. Furthermore, in 1473, Iga Nitsuki can be seen in Fuchikawa no Ki safeguarding Ichijō Kaneyoshi, who is traveling to Mino Province. Following the clan's division during the war, the clan gradually declined.

=== Edo period ===
Later, the clan was indigenous to Mimasaka Province (present-day Okayama Prefecture). In the Edo period, some branches of the Nitsuki clan later became retainers to the Tokugawa shogunate as well as retainers to the Mōri clan.

== See also ==
- Sakakibara clan
- Iga Ueno Castle
