= Sakakibara clan =

Edo period Japanese samurai clan

Sakakibara clan 榊原
- Mon: Sakakibara-Genji-Guruma / Navagraha
- Home province: Ise Province
- Parent house: Minamoto clan
- Titles: Viscount; Daimyo
- Founder: Sakakibara Toshinaga
- Final ruler: Sakakibara Masataka
- Current head: Sakakibara Masaharu
- Founding year: early Muromachi period
- Dissolution: still extant
- Ruled until: 1871 (Abolition of the han system)

The Sakakibara clan (Japanese: 榊原氏, Hepburn: Sakakibara-shi) was a Japanese samurai clan who rose to prominence during the Edo period under the Tokugawa shogunate. Before the Meiji Restoration, the clan served as daimyō of Takada Domain in Echigo Province. The Sakakibara were one of the four families who enjoyed the privilege of providing a regent during the minority of a Shōgun. Under the Meiji government's kazoku peerage system, the head of the clan held the title of viscount (shishaku).

== Origins ==
The Sakakibara claimed descent from the Seiwa Genji via the Nitsuki clan, who ruled two districts of Iga Province from the early Muromachi period. The 9th generation descendant of Nitsuki Yoshinaga relocated to Sakakibara village in Ise Province (part of the present-day city of Tsu, Mie) and his son, Toshinaga was the first to take the name of "Sakakibara".

The Sakakibara initially served the Kitabatake clan, but later transferred their fealty to the Oda clan, and in 1584 were considered retainers of Oda Nobukane, brother of Oda Nobunaga. Around the same time, a branch of the clan settled in Mikawa Province and entered into the service of Tokugawa Ieyasu. The clan history is sketchy about this period, and there is some indication that the Sakakibara in Mikawa may have been the main branch of the clan.

Sakakibara Yasumasa (1548–1606) rose to prominence as a general under Tokugawa Ieyasu. Along with Sakai Tadatsugu, Ii Naomasa and Honda Tadakatsu, he was known as one of the "four heavenly kings of the Tokugawa" (Tokugawa shi-tennō), and was also styled with the sobriquet of "sixteen heavenly generals of the Tokugawa" (Tokugawa ju-roku shinsho). After the Battle of Sekigahara, he was granted the special honour of changing his name to use one of Ieyasu's name characters – Yasu. and was awarded the han (fief) of Tatebayashi Domain (100,000 koku) in Kōzuke Province.

== Fudai daimyō ==
Over its history, the Sakakibara clan was relocated several times by the shogunate.

- 1643-1649: Shirakawa Domain (140,000 koku) in Mutsu Province.
- 1649-1667: Himeji Domain (150,000 koku) in Harima Province.
- 1667-1704: Murakami Domain (150,000 koku) in Echigo Province
- 1704-1741: Himeji Domain (150,000 koku) in Harima Province
- 1741-1871: Takada Domain (150,000 koku) in Echigo Province

In a last move, the clan narrowly escaped attainder by the shogunate. Sakakibara Masamine, the 3rd Sakakibara daimyō of Himeji Domain, angered Shōgun Tokugawa Yoshimune by flaunting sumptuary edicts, and purchasing the freedom of Takao Daiyu, a famed courtesan from a Yoshiwara brothel for a tremendous sum of money. Yoshimune further punished Masamine by ordering the transfer of the clan from Himeji to Takada, which, although it had the same nominal kokudaka, was remote and cold and had a portion of lands spread over a number of exclaves in Mutsu Province. His son, Sakakibara Masazumi died at age 10 without ever having been formally received by the Shōgun. This placed the clan in a crisis, as this would now allow the clan to maintain the succession through a posthumous adoption. Therefore, it was decided to keep Mazazumi's death a secret and replace him with his younger brother, who was later named Sakakibara Masanaga.

During the Boshin War, after some uncertainty, the clan sided with the imperial armies and the clan fought against the Ōuetsu Reppan Dōmei and in the Aizu War. Following the Meiji restoration, the final daimyō of Takeda Domain (and the 16th hereditary chieftain of the Sakakibara clan), Sakakibara Masataka was enabled with the title of viscount (shishaku) under the kazoku peerage system.

On his death the title passed to his adopted son, Sakakibara Masakazu (榊原政和; 1868-1927) followed by Sakakibara Masaharu (榊原政春 b.1911), who was a graduated of the law school of Tokyo Imperial University, member of the upper house of the Diet of Japan and who was married to a daughter of Duke Tokugawa Yoshihisa, the son of former Shōgun Tokugawa Yoshinobu. Masaharu was followed by Sakakibara Masaharu (榊原政信) as 17th hereditary chieftain of the Sakakibara clan.

== See also ==
- Sakakibara Kenkichi, 1830–, kendo instructor to Shōgun Tokugawa Iemochi
