= Ichijō-ji =

Buddhist temple in Kasai, Hyōgo prefecture, Japan

- 一乗寺
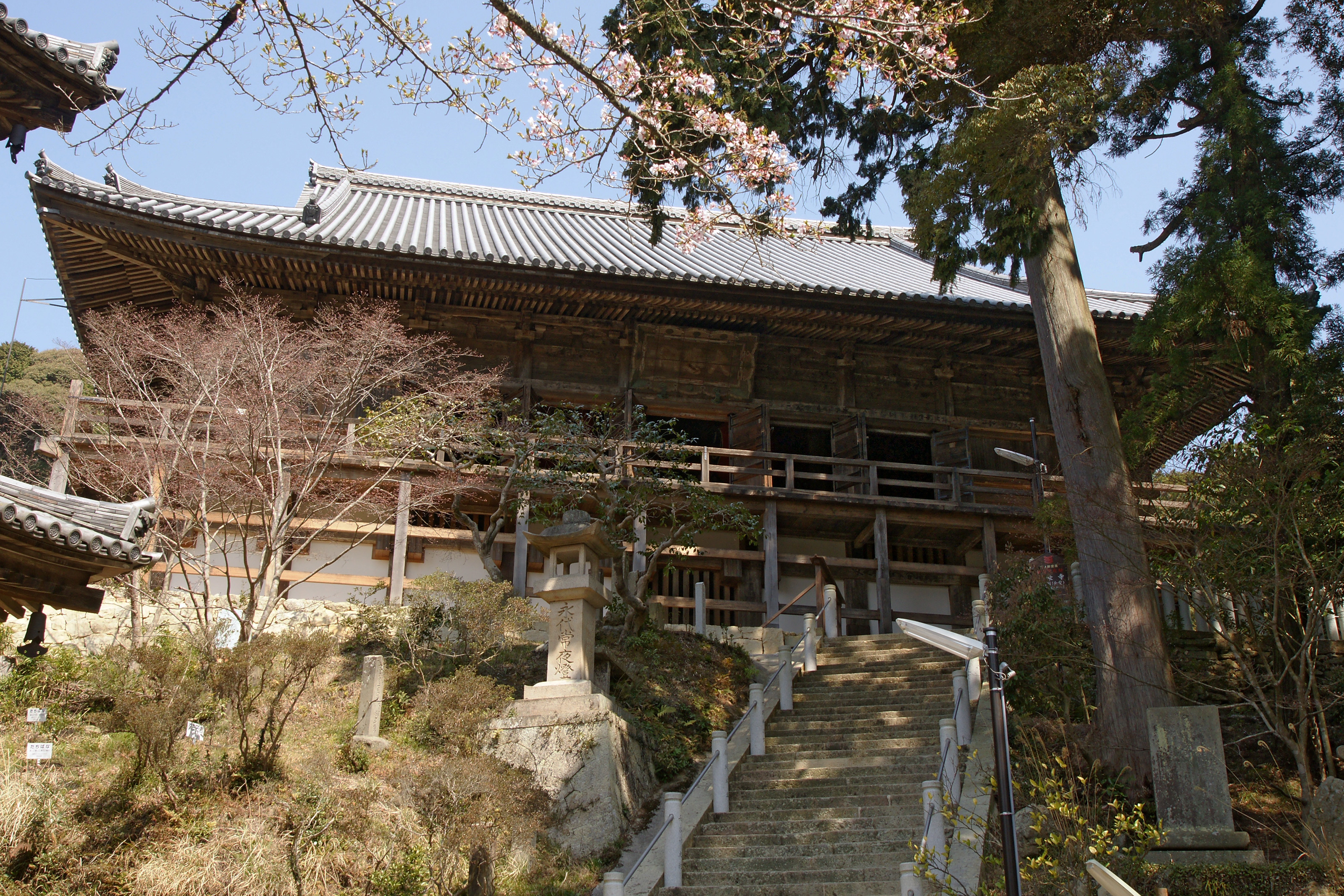
- Ichijō-ji Hondo

- Location within Hyōgo Prefecture Location within Japan

Religion
- Affiliation: Buddhist
- Deity: Shō-Kannon
- Rite: Tendai
- Status: functional

Location
- Location: 821-17 Sakamoto-cho, Kasai-shi, Hyōgo-ken 675-2222
- Interactive map of Ichijō-ji
- Coordinates: 34°51′33.51″N 134°49′8.49″E

Architecture
- Founder: c.Hōdō
- Completed: c.650
- National Treasure National Important Cultural Property National Place of Scenic Beauty

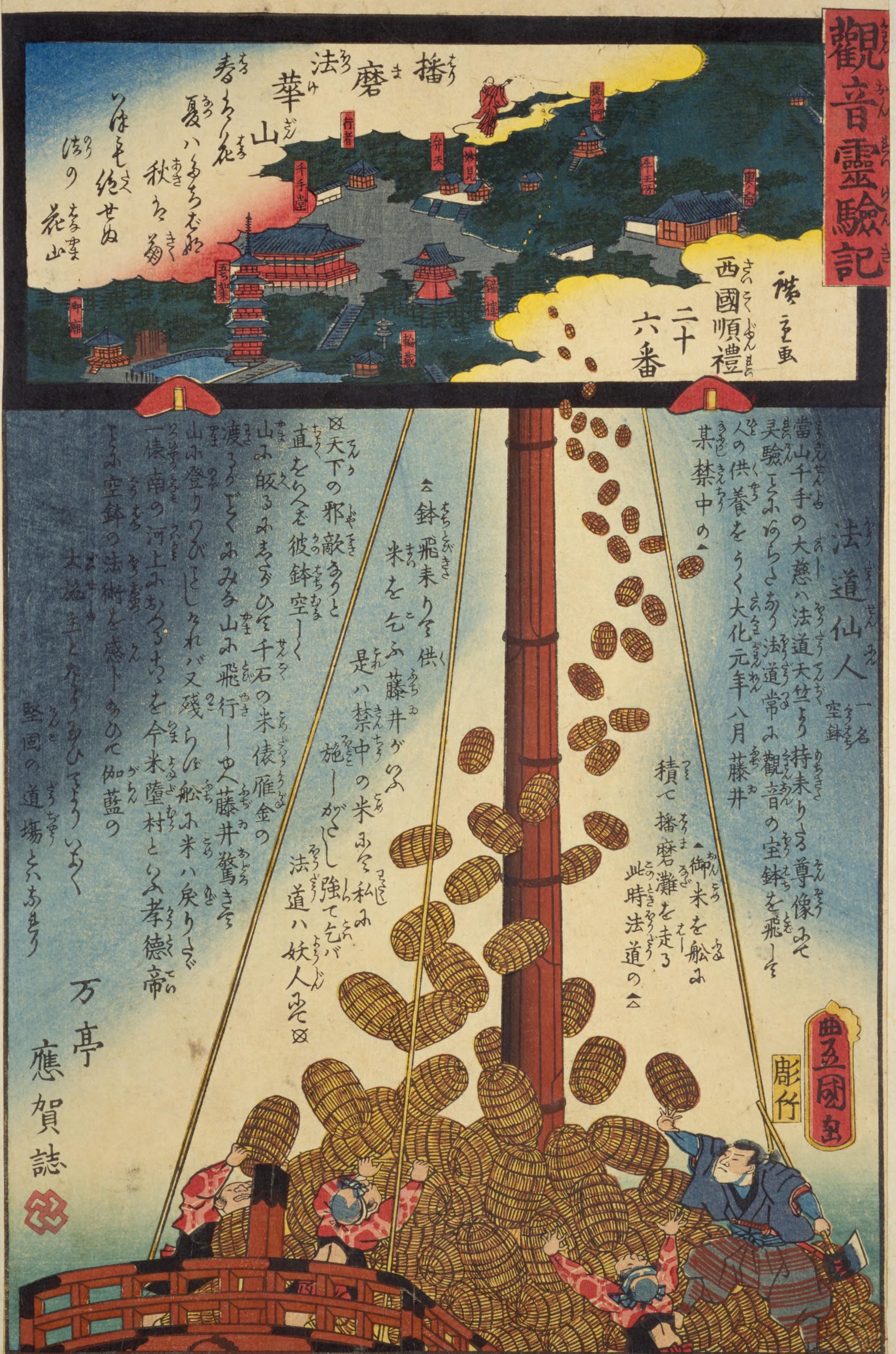
from the picture album "Kannon Reigen ki"

Ichijō-ji (一乗寺) is a Buddhist temple located in the Sakamoto neighborhood of the city of Kasai, Hyōgo Prefecture Japan. It belongs to the Tendai sect of Japanese Buddhism and its honzon is a statue of Shō-Kannon Bosatsu. Its three-story pagoda, a National Treasure, is a representative example of Japanese architecture from the late Heian period and one of Japan's oldest existing pagodas. The temple grounds are famous for its cherry blossoms in spring and autumn foliage in autumn. The temple's full name is Hokke-san Ichijō-ji (法華山 一乗寺) . The temple is the 26th stop on the Saigoku Kannon Pilgrimage route.

== Overview ==
The founding of this temple is uncertain. According to accounts such as the Kamakura period "Genkō Shakusho," the monk Hōdō flew to Japan on a purple cloud from India via Sui or Tang dynasty China and the Korean kingdom of Baekje. He discovered a sacred mountain in the shape of an eight-petaled lotus flower in Kamo County, Harima Province (present-day Kasai, Hyōgo). Upon landing there, he named it "Mount Hokke," referring to the sacred mountain of the Lotus Sutra. Hōdō was known as the "Empty Bowl Sennin" (Empty Bowl Sage) because he used his supernatural powers to send bowls flying and receive offerings such as rice. His reputation spread to Asuka-kyō, and in the first year of the Hakuchi era (650), at the request of Emperor Kotoku, he was commissioned by him to build Ichijō-ji. Temples with legends claiming to have been founded by the hermit Hōdō are concentrated in eastern Hyōgo Prefecture, and the possibility exists that there was a real person from India who inspired this legend and became a central figure in the local faith. However, there is no historical documentary evidence to support this theory.

Ichijō-ji does have six gilt-bronze Buddha statues dating back to the 7th and 8th centuries (three of which are designated Important Cultural Properties (ICP), and the presence of ruins of abandoned temples and stone Buddha statues dating back to the Nara period in the vicinity confirms that this region was a place where Buddhist culture flourished from an early period. It is believed that Ichijō-ji was originally located on Mount Kasamatsu, slightly north of its current location. At the foot of Mount Kasamatsu is a Nara-period stone Buddha triad known as the Furubokke Stone Buddha (ICP), with "Furubokke" likely referring to the former site of Ichijō-ji. The existing three-story pagoda at Ichijō-ji was built in 1171 at the end of the Heian period. It is believed that the temple complex was established at its current location by that year, but the exact date of relocation is unknown. According to the entry for July 23, 1285, in the autobiography "Kanshin Gakusei-ki" by Eison, the founder of Shingon Ritsu, beginning around 1283, Mount Hokke began requesting Eison's visit, with several senior officials making seven visits to Saidai-ji in Yamato Province, the headquarters of the Shingon Ritsu sect. Therefore, in the winter of 1284, Eison held a council of monks and decided to visit Mount Hokke, promising to visit in the spring of 1285. However, Eison was requested by both the Kamakura shogunate and the Imperial Court to take up the important Buddhist position of head priest of Shitennō-ji. He could not refuse the imperial order and ended up working at Shitennō-ji in the spring of 1285, but visited the temple for several days en route to his new post.

The temple suffered several fires, including one in 1523, in which the entire temple complex, with the exception of the pagoda, burned down due to civil wars of the Sengoku period. Akamatsu Yoshitsuke, warlord of Harima Province, rebuilt many of the buildings in 1562, but the complex was again destroyed by fire in 1628, and once more only the three-storied pagoda survived. The main hall was rebuilt in 1628 with a donation from Honda Tadamasa, the daimyō of Himeji Domain. The Shōrō (bell tower), which has also survived, was completed the next year.

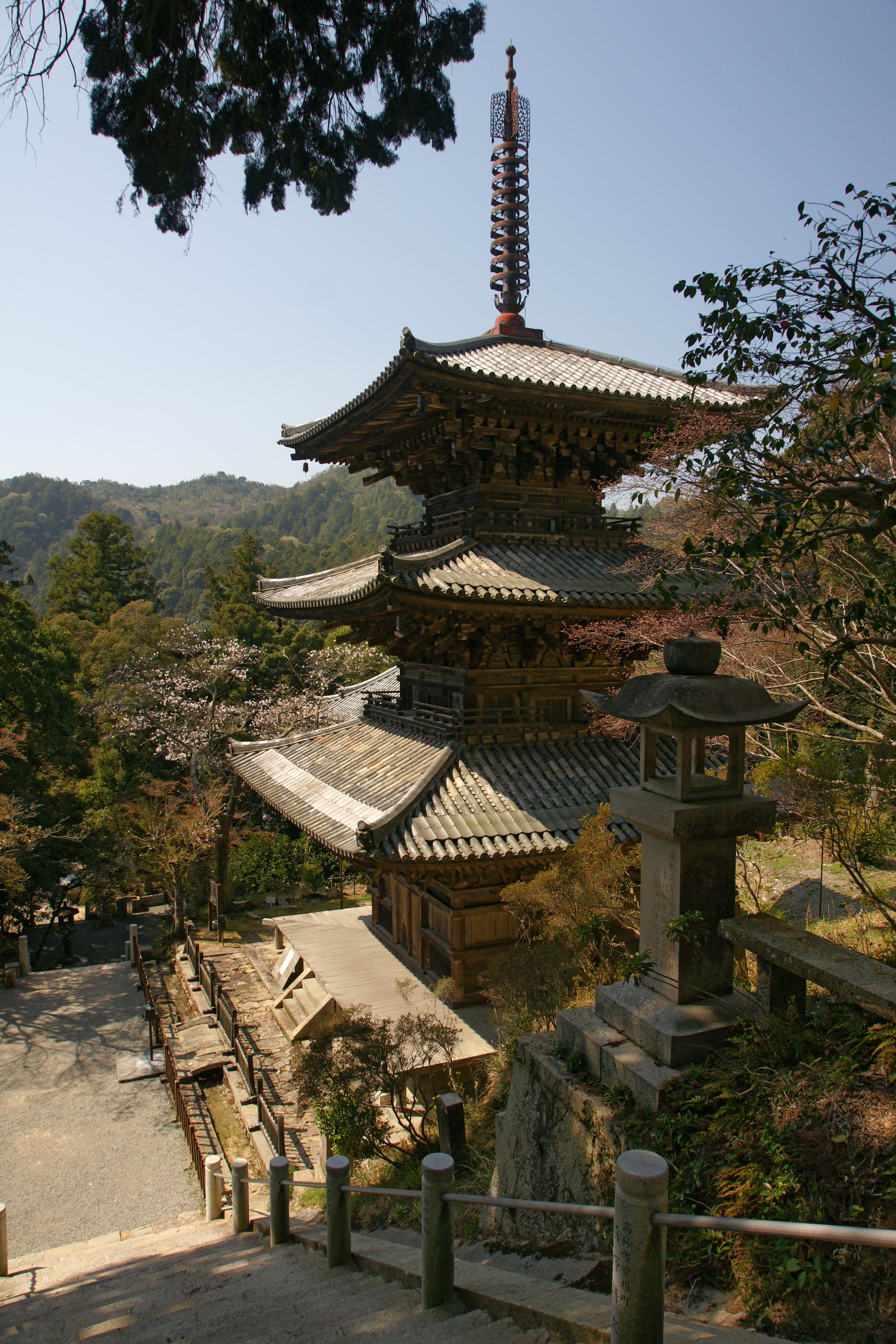
Three-story pagoda (NT)

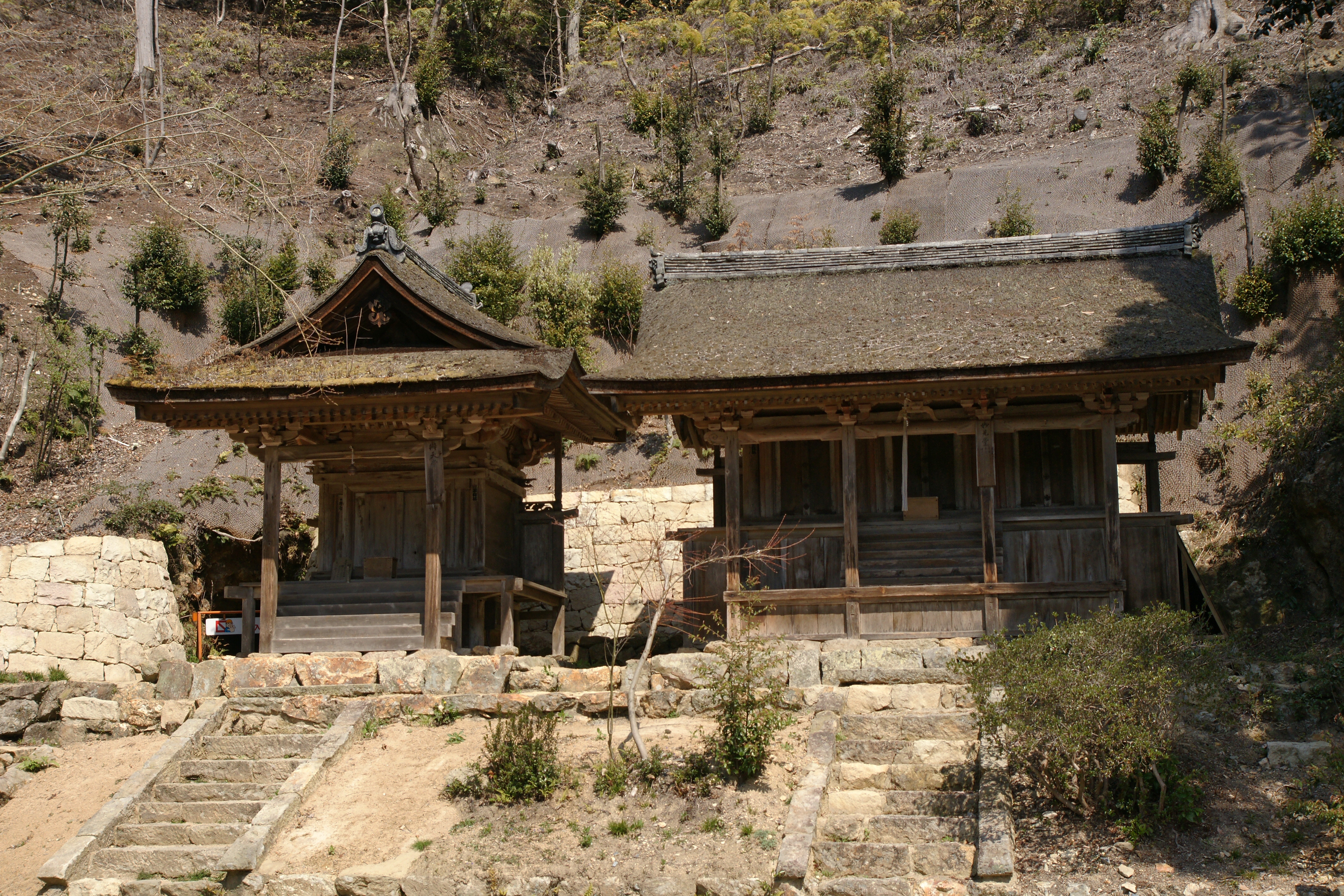
Benten-dō and Myōmi-dō (both ICPs)

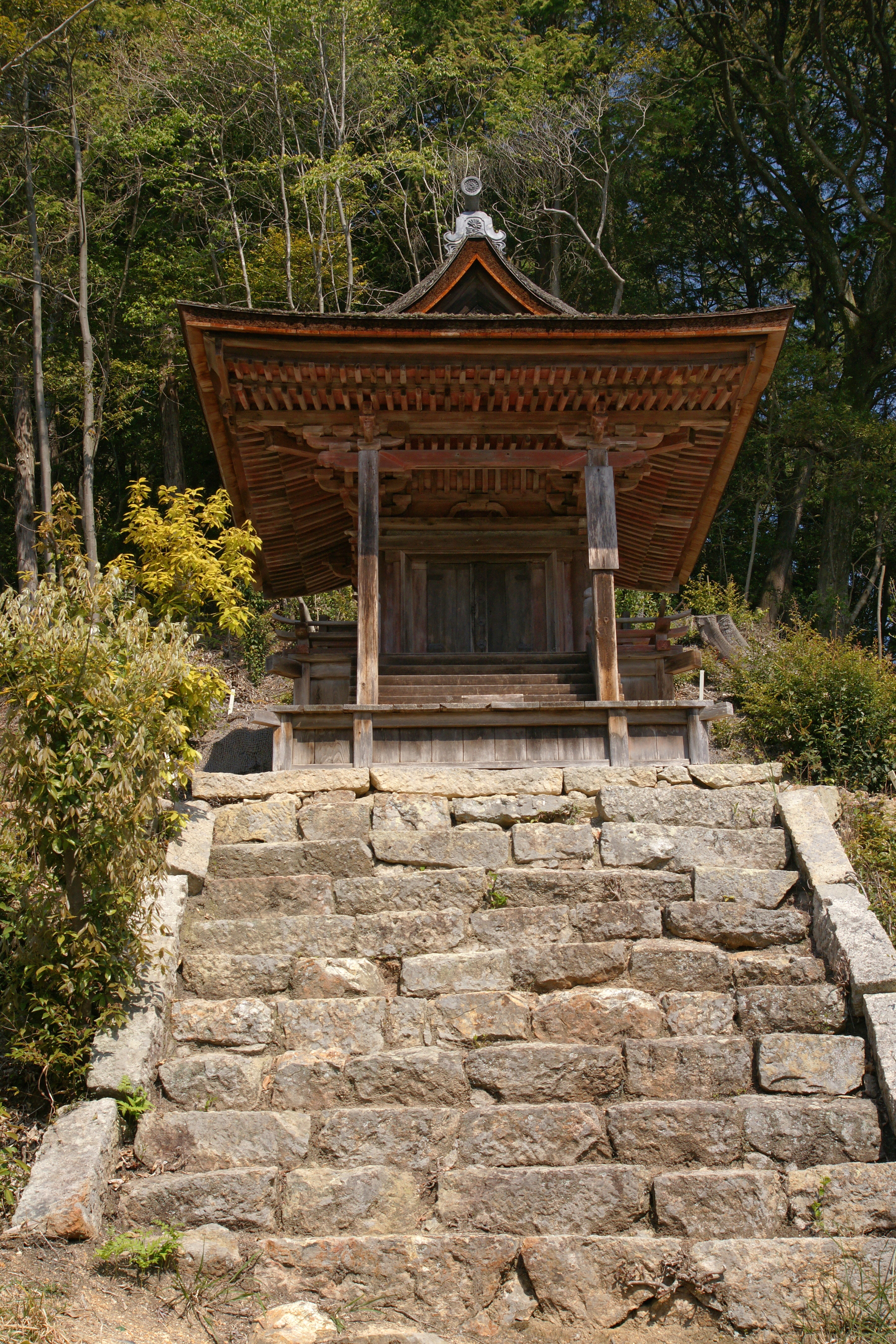
Gōhō-dō (ICP)

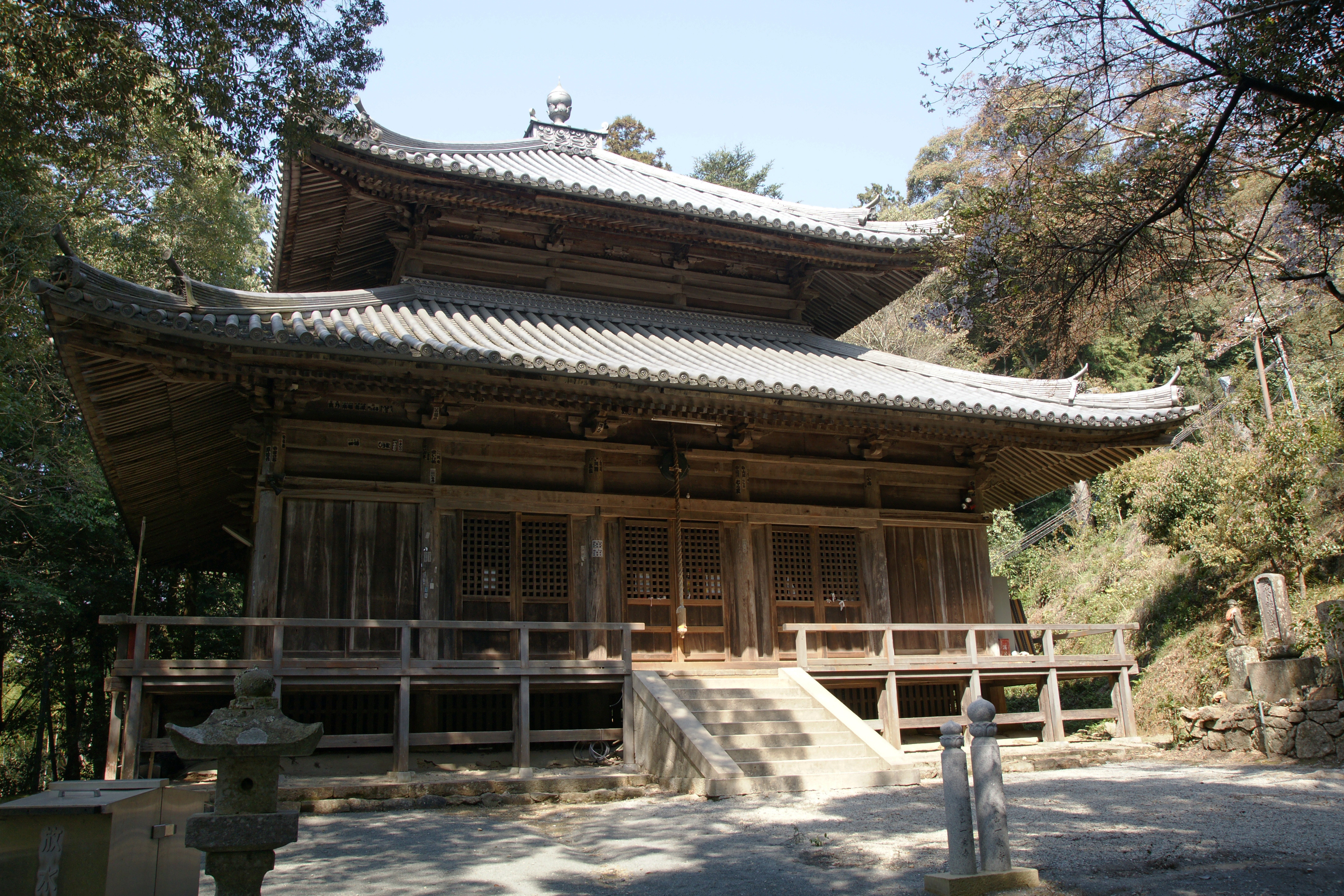
Jōdō-dō

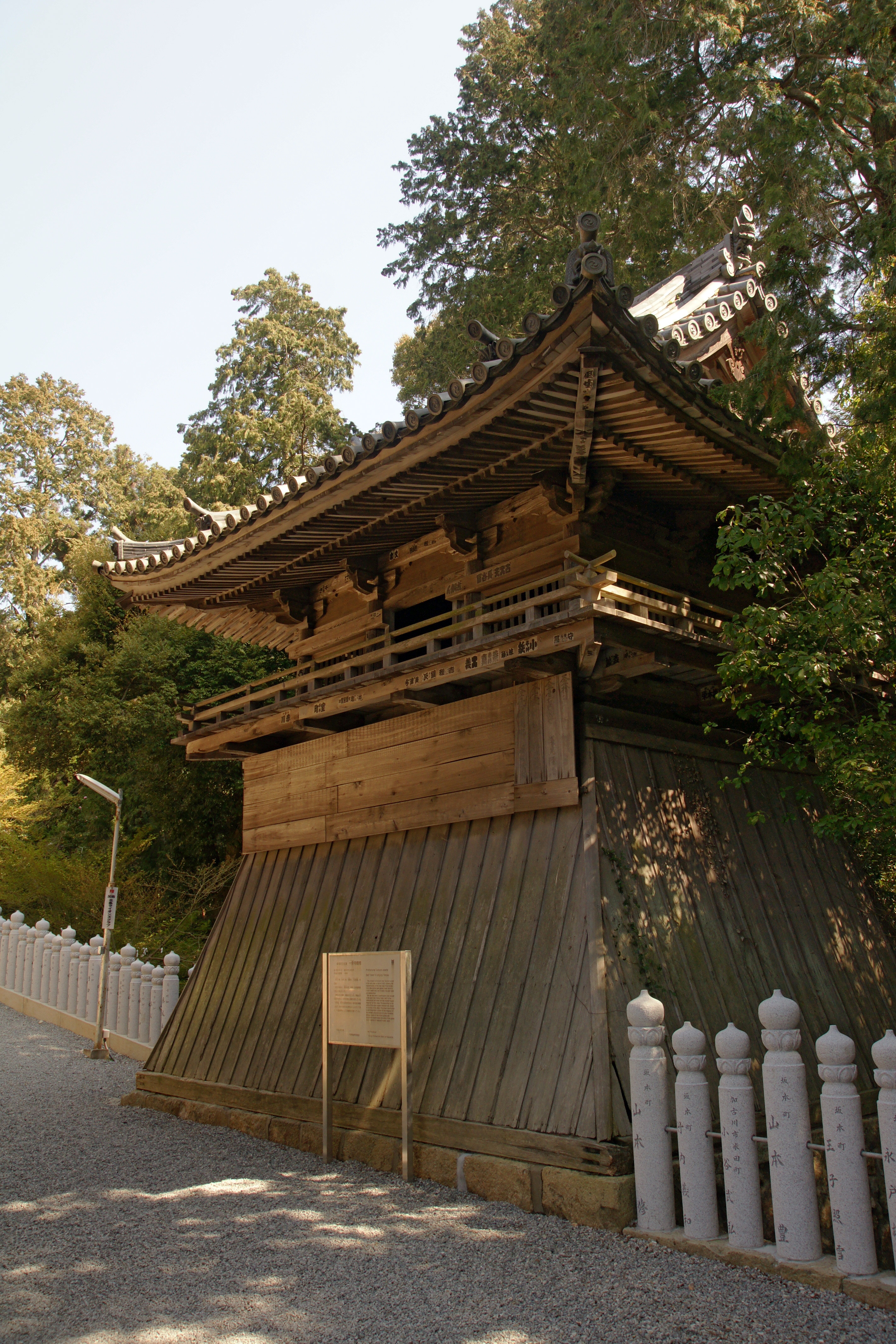
Shōrō

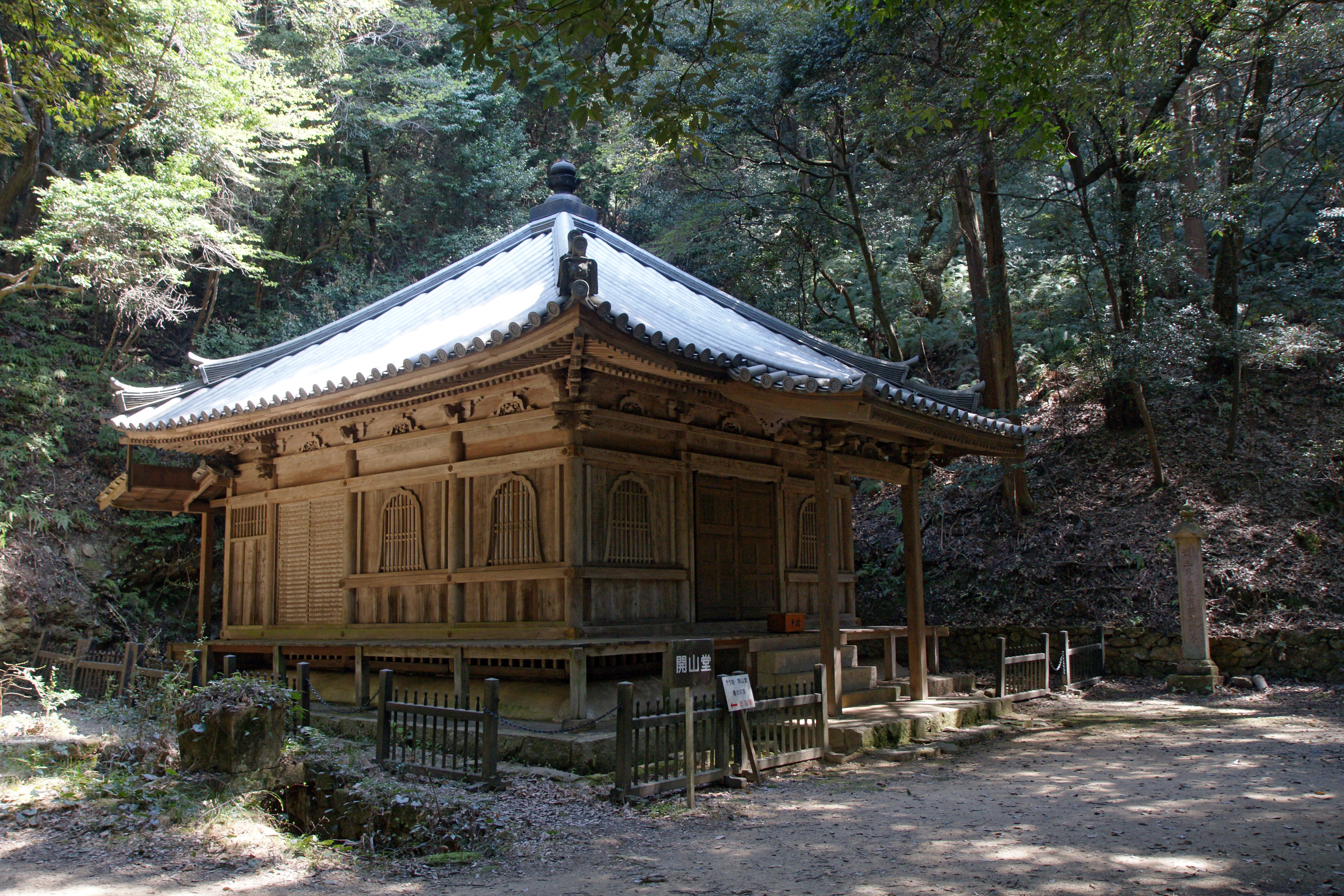
Kaisan-dō

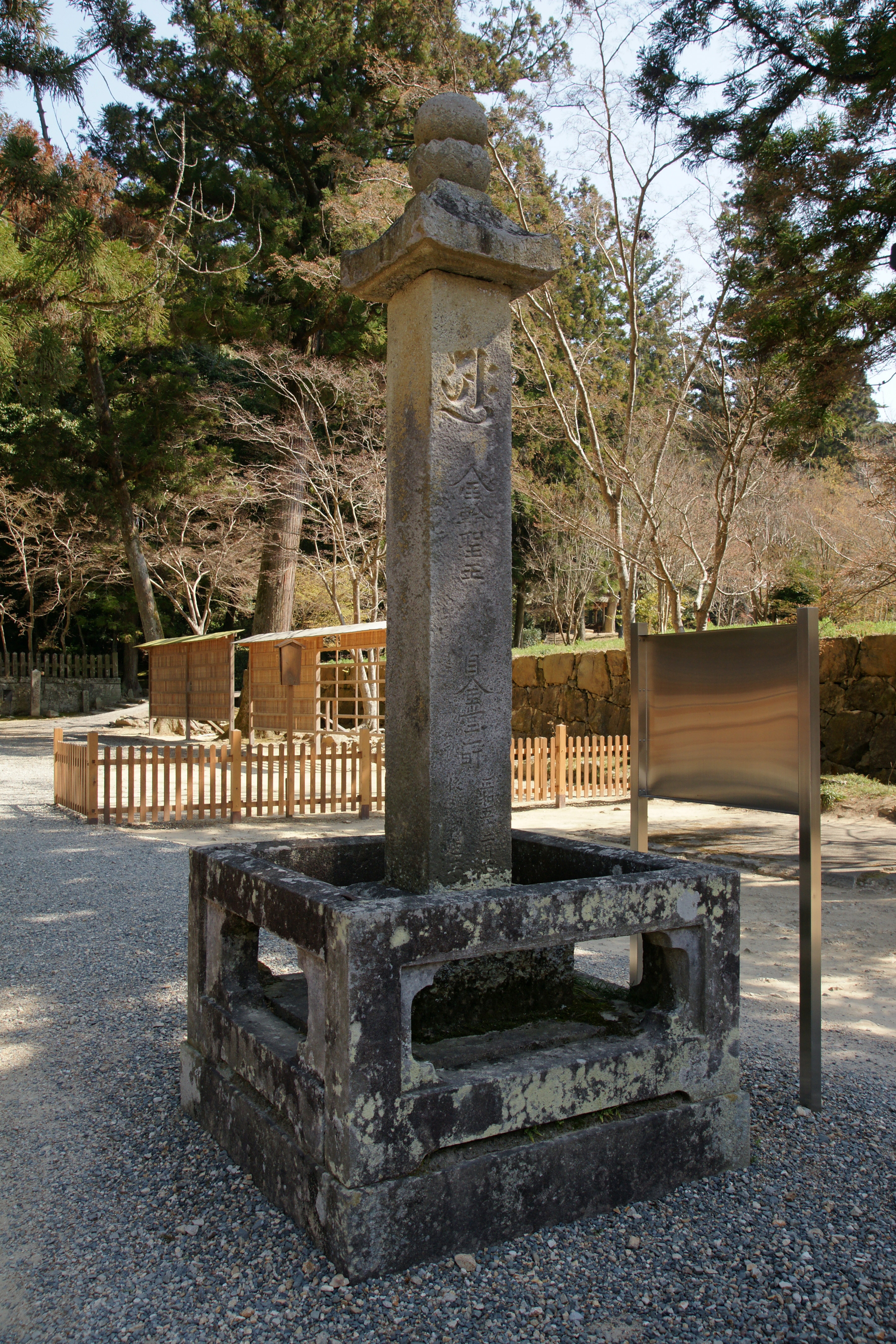
Stone Kasatōba (Hyōgo Prefectural Tangible Cultural Property)

== Cultural Properties ==
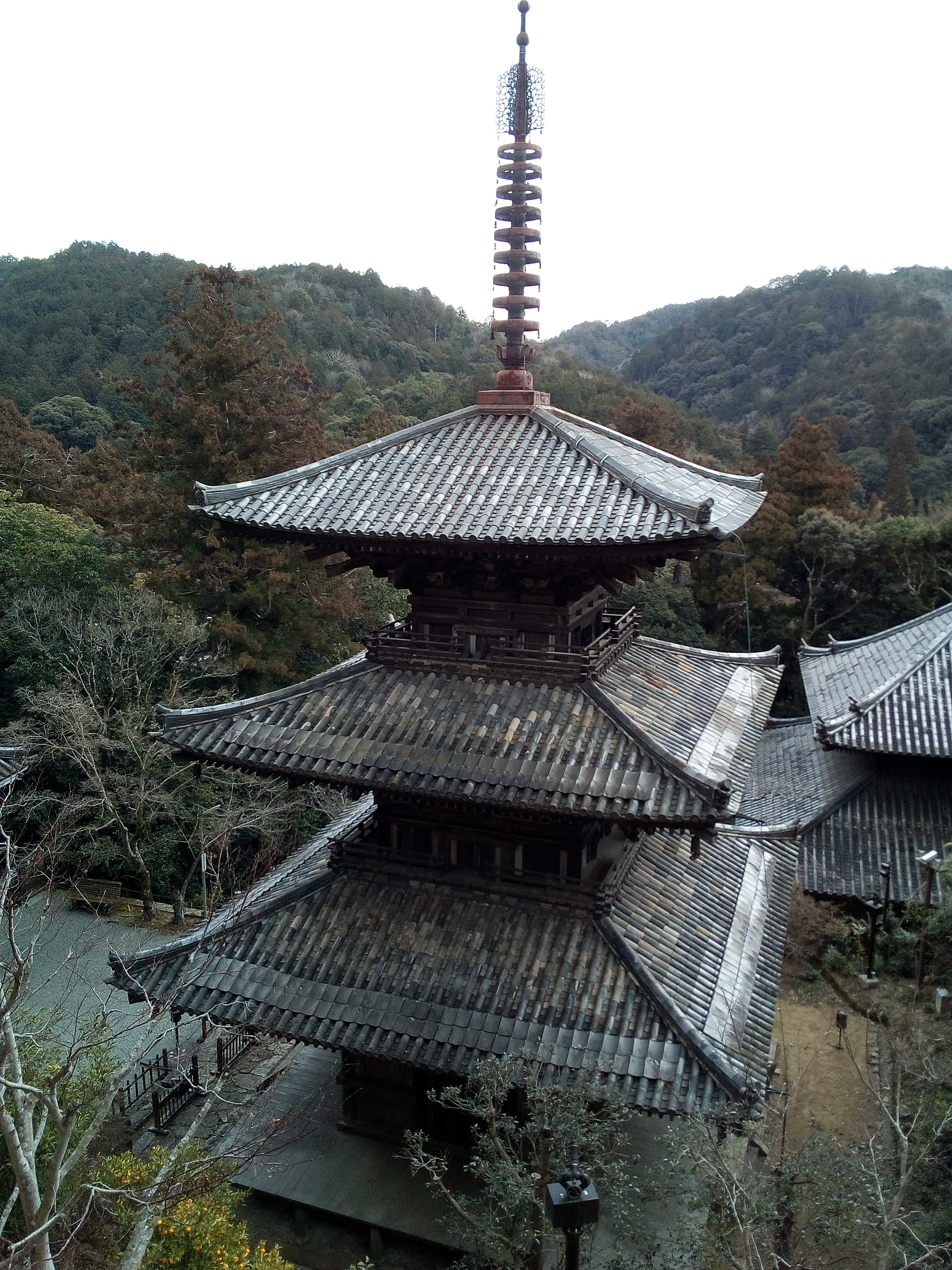
Three-storied pagoda (view from the Kondō)

=== National Treasure ===
- Three-story Pagoda (三重塔, Sanjūnotō), late-Heian period (1171); The original pagoda was destroyed during the conflicts leading to the Genpei War, and rebuilt soon after using donations collected by wandering kanjin priests, as imperial patronage of Ichijō-ji had ended with the rise of the military ruling class. It is the wayō (和様) of Japanese architecture, which was developed during the Heian period, mainly by the esoteric sects Tendai and Shingon, and coined in the Kamakura period to distinguish it from the newer zenshūyō and daibutsuyō styles of architecture. The pagoda is 3x3 ken, and has a hongawarabuki roof, composed of flat broad concave tiles and semi-cylindrical convex tiles covering the seams of the former. Inside the pagoda there is a central pole standing up to the third floor, symbolic of Mount Sumeru, the center of the universe in the Buddhist cosmology. The spire at the top of third floor continues the pole.
- Colored silk portrait of Prince Shotoku and Tendai High Priest (絹本著色聖徳太子及び天台高僧像）), Heian period (1171); set of ten.

=== National Important Cultural Properties ===
- Kondō (Hondō) (金堂（大悲閣、本堂）), Edo period (1628); The original building was destroyed by fire in 1523 and then again in 1628. The present main hall was rebuilt by order of Honda Tadamasa in 1628. The pine and cypress timber used for its construction were brought from Kyushu and Shikoku. It is a 9x8 ken single-storied building in the irimoya and kake-zukuri style, with hongawarabuki roof, and a typical example of main hall buildings from the early Edo period. It is the largest main hall on the Kansai Kannon Pilgrimage. A typhoon damaged the building in 1999. During the subsequent survey of the structure other problems were discovered, including damage due to white ants and rotting in the structural beams. The Kondō was carefully dismantled and restored between 1999 and 2007, preserving as much of the original materials as possible. The main hall was finally reopened in 2007.
- Gohō-dō (護法堂), late-Kamakura period (1275–1332);
- Myōmi-dō (妙見堂), late-Muromachi period (1467–1572);
- Benten-dō (弁天堂), mid-Muromachi period (1393–1466); This small 1x1 ken building employs the kasuga-zukuri style of architecture.
- Stone Gorintō (弁天堂), Kamakura period (1321);
- Colored Silk Painting of standing Amida Nyorai (絹本著色阿弥陀如来像), Kamakura period;
- Colored Silk Painting of Five Wisdom Kings (絹本著色阿弥陀如来像), Kamakura period;
- Bronze standing statue of a Bosatsu (銅造観音菩薩立像), Asuka period;
- Bronze standing statue of a Bosatsu (銅造観音菩薩立像), Asuka period; set of 2
- Wooden statue of standing Hōdō Sennin (木造法道仙人立像（開山堂安置）), Kamakura period (1286);
- Wooden statue of seated priest (木造僧形坐像), Heian period ( repaired 1192);

=== Hyōgo Prefecture Designated Tangible Cultural Properties ===
- Shōrō (鐘楼), Edo period (1629)
- Stone Hōtō Pagoda (石造宝塔), Edo period (1629), set of 2 <"Bunka14"/>
- Stone Kasatō Pagoda (石造笠塔婆), Kamakura period <"Bunka14"/>
- Roof tiles from Three-story Pagoda (三重塔古瓦), Heian period <"Bunka14"/>

=== Hyōgo Prefecture Registered Tangible Cultural Properties ===
- Kaisan-dō (開山堂), Edo period (1671)

=== Kasai City Designated Tangible Cultural Properties ===
- Stone Nine-story Pagoda (石造九重塔), Nanboku-cho period;

== See also ==
- List of National Treasures of Japan (temples)
- List of National Treasures of Japan (paintings)
