= Honda Tadamasa =

Japanese daimyō

- 本多 忠政
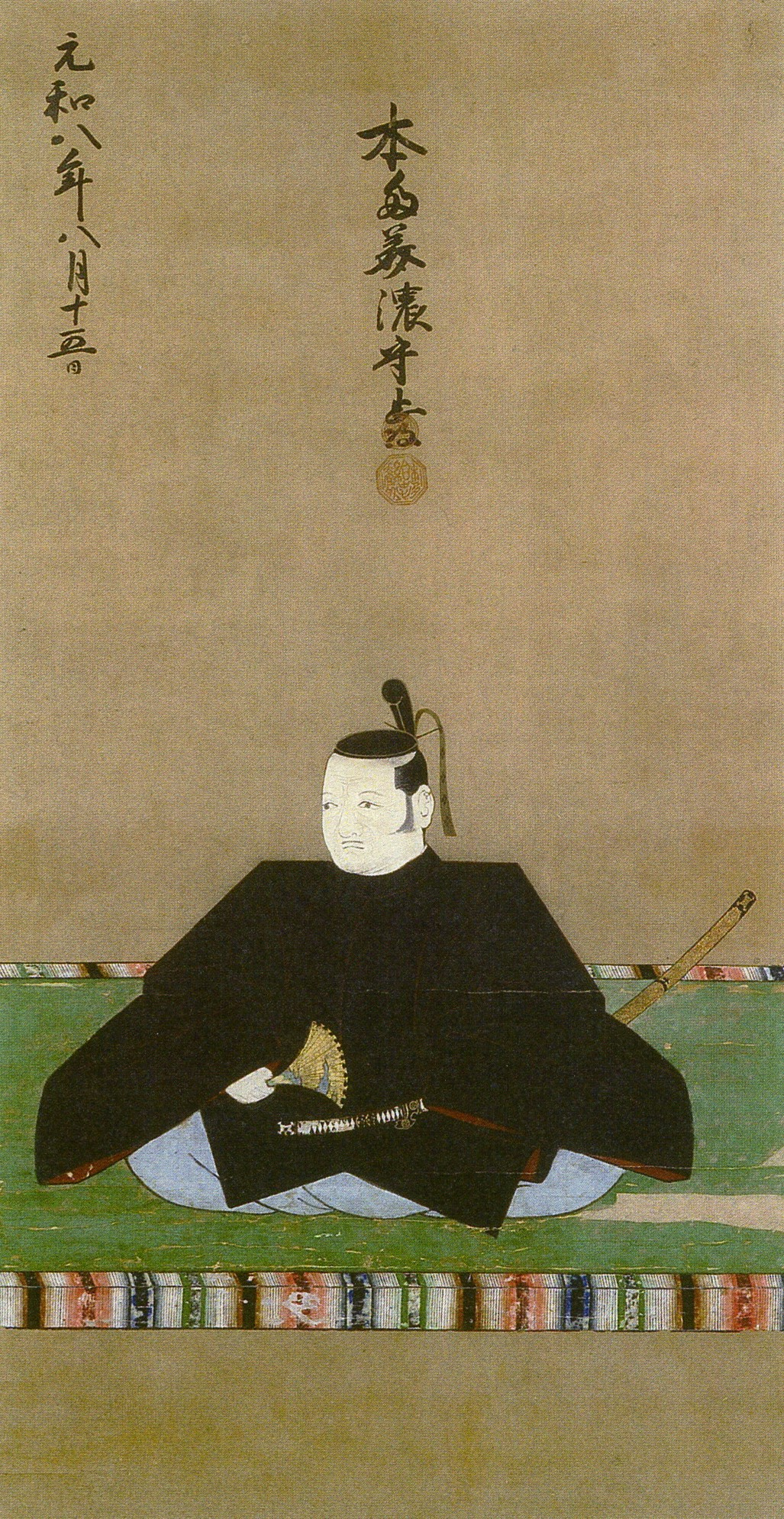

Daimyō of Kuwana
- In office 1609–1617
- Preceded by: Honda Tadakatsu
- Succeeded by: Matsudaira Sadakatsu

Lord of Himeji
- In office 1617–1631
- Preceded by: Ikeda Mitsumasa
- Succeeded by: Honda Masatomo

Personal details
- Born: 1575 Mikawa Province, Japan
- Died: September 6, 1631 (aged 55–56) Edo, Japan
- Spouse: Matsudaira Kumahime
- Parents: Honda Tadakatsu (father); Achiwa Goemon Gentetsu's daughter (mother)

Honda Tadamasa (本多 忠政; 1575 – September 6, 1631) was a Japanese daimyō of the early Edo period, who ruled the Kuwana Domain and then the Himeji Domain. He was the son of Honda Tadakatsu.

Tadamasa's first battle was during the Siege of Odawara, in 1590; he also fought at the Battle of Sekigahara in 1600. After his father's retirement in 1609, he succeeded to the Honda family headship, becoming the second generation lord of the Kuwana Domain. Several years later, he took part in the Siege of Osaka, and received the Himeji Domain, with 150,000 koku of revenues, as a reward.

Tadamasa's wife was Kumahime, the daughter of Tokugawa Ieyasu's eldest son Matsudaira Nobuyasu. Their eldest son, Honda Tadatoki (the husband of Tokugawa Hidetada's daughter Senhime), was in line to inherit the Himeji Domain. However, as Tadatoki died in 1626, at age 31, the domain went to his younger brother, Honda Masatomo.

In 1617–1618, Tadamasa and his family inherited Himeji Castle, and he added several buildings to the castle complex, including a special tower for his daughter-in-law, Princess Sen. In 1628–1629 he rebuilt some of the building at Ichijō-ji that had been destroyed by fire, including the main hall.

== Notes ==
Preceded by Honda Tadakatsu	Daimyō of Kuwana; 1609–1617	Succeeded by Matsudaira Sadakatsu
Preceded by Ikeda Mitsumasa	Daimyō of Himeji; 1617–1631	Succeeded by Honda Masatomo
