= Himeji Domain =

Japanese feudal domain located in Harima Province

Himeji Domain 姫路藩
- under Tokugawa shogunate Japan
- 1600–1871
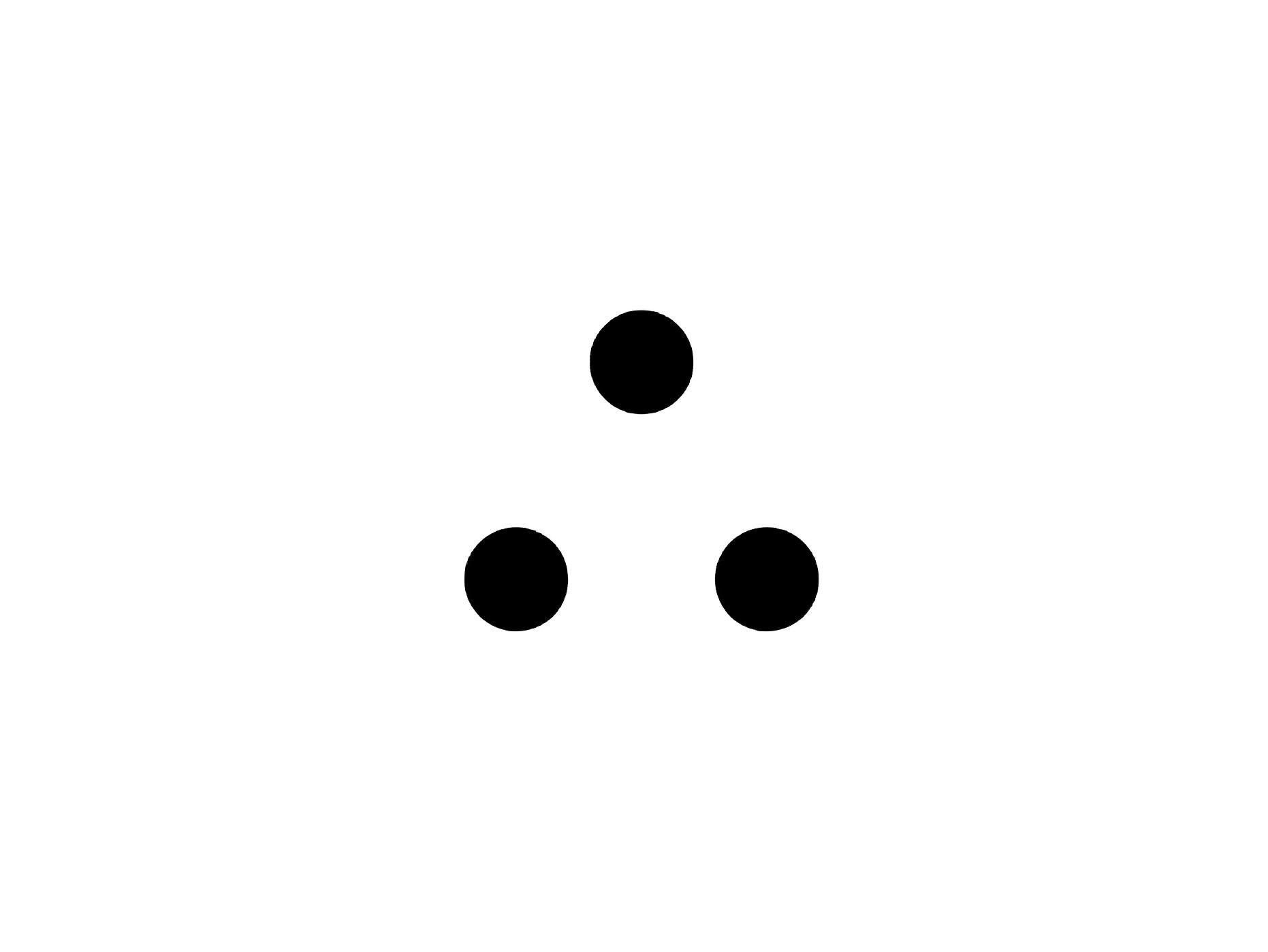
- Military flag
- Capital: Himeji Castle
- Area
  - Coordinates: 34°50′21.76″N 134°41′38.75″E
  - Type: Daimyō
- Historical era: Edo period
  - Established: 1600
  - Disestablished: 1871
- Today part of: part of Hyogo Prefecture

Location of Himeji Castle
Himeji Domain (Japan)

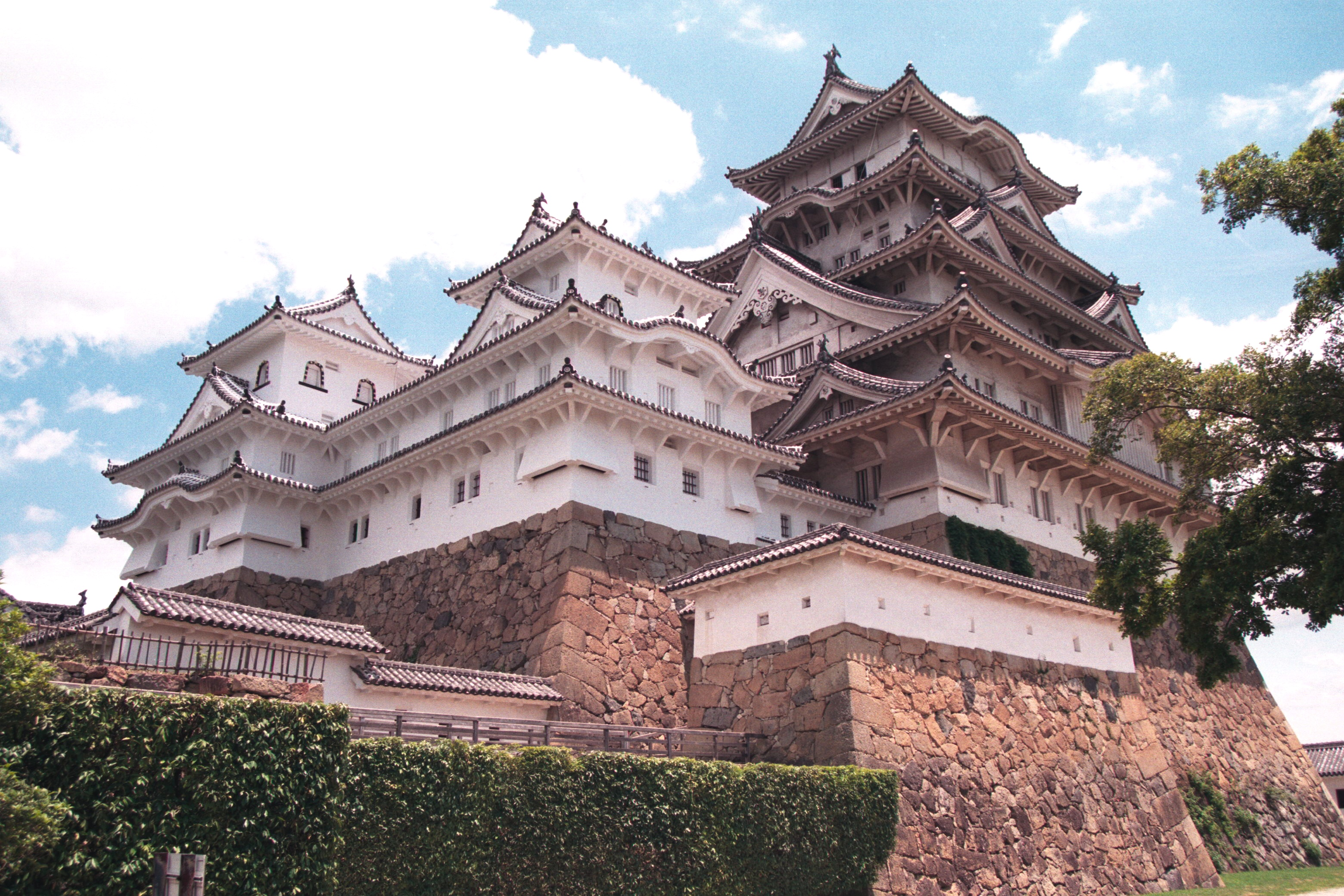
Himeji Castle

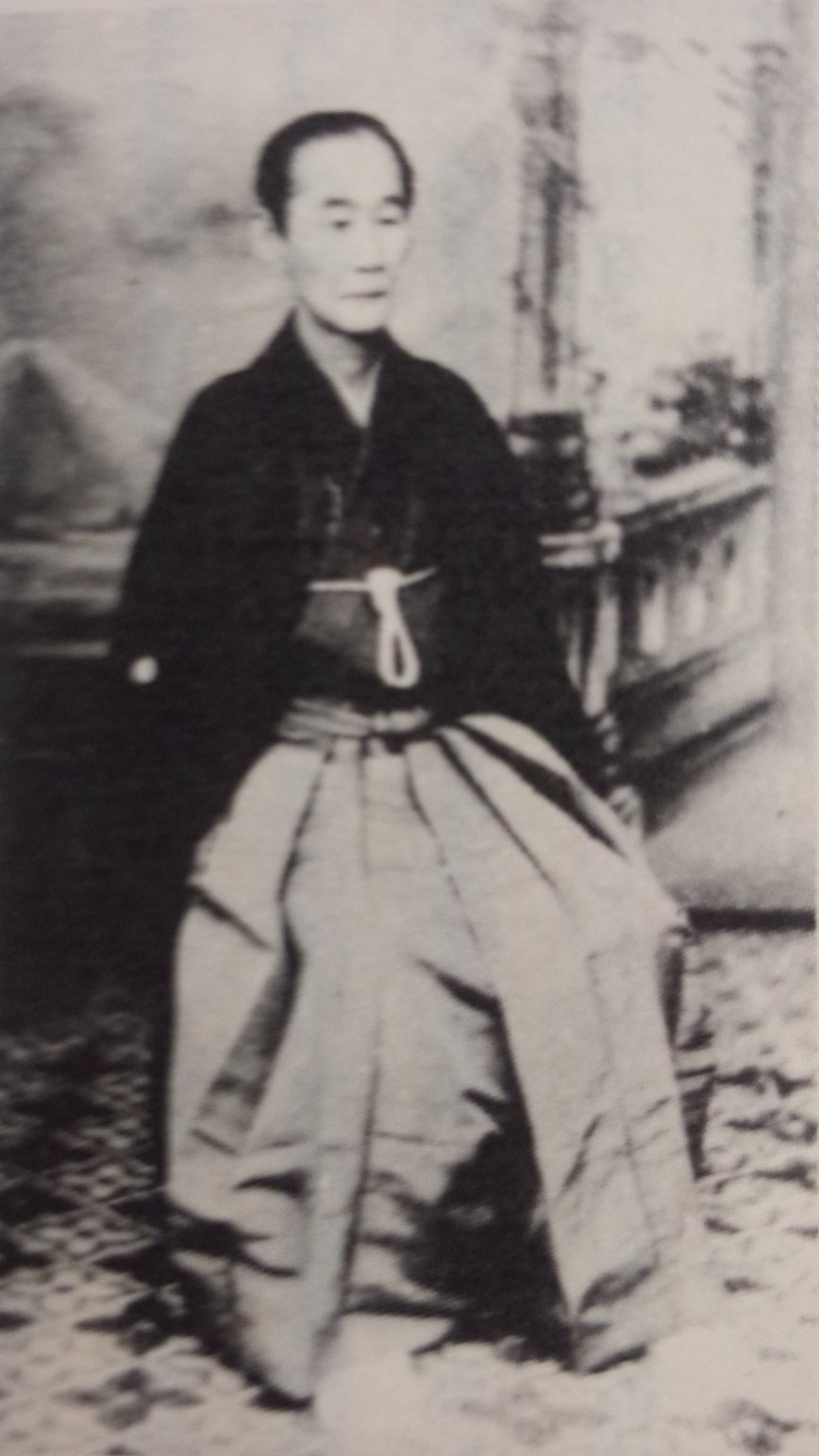
Sakai Tadatoshi

Himeji Domain (姫路藩, Himeji-han) was a feudal domain under the Tokugawa shogunate of Edo period Japan, located in Harima Province in what is now the southern portion of modern-day Hyōgo Prefecture. It was centered around Himeji Castle, which is located in what is now the city of Himeji, Hyōgo.

== History ==
During the Muromachi period, the area around Himeji was part of the vast holdings of the Akamatsu clan, the shugo of Harima Province; however, by the Sengoku period, the greatly weakened Akamatsu were defeated by the forces of Oda Nobunaga under his general Hashiba Hideyoshi and the early Himeji Castle was surrendered by Kuroda Yoshitaka. After Hideyoshi succeeded Oda Nobunaga, he assigned the castle to his son Kinoshita Iesada with an estate of 25,000 koku. After the Battle of Sekigahara, Tokugawa Ieyasu relocated Kinoshita to Bitchu Province in 1600 and assigned Himeji to his general and son-in-law Ikeda Terumasa. Ikeda Terumasa was formerly lord of Yoshida Domain in Mikawa Province with a kokudaka of 150,000 koku, but the transfer to Himeji more than tripled his rank to 520,000 koku. In addition, his son Ikeda Tadatsugu was awarded the 280,000 koku Okayama Domain, his third son Ikeda Tadao was given the 60,000 koku Ikuni Domain in Awaji Province and a brother, Ikeda Nagayoshi was given the 60,000 koku Tottori Domain. This gave the Ikeda clan a total kokudaka of over one million koku and funded a massive reconstruction project to rebuild Himeji Castle. He was succeeded by his eldest son, Ikeda Toshitaka, whose mother was Ikeda Terumasa's first wife and who was therefore not a lineal descendant of Tokugawa Ieyasu. Toshitaka died at a young age in 1617, and as Toshitaka's son, Mitsumasa was still in his minority, the Tokugawa shogunate transferred the Ikeda clan to Tottori Domain, as such a strategic stronghold controlling the San'yōdō highway, which connected the Kinai region with western Japan could not be entrusted to a minor.

The vast holdings of the Ikeda clan were divided among several fudai daimyō. Himeji Castle, with 150,000 koku, was assigned to Honda Tadamasa. His son Honda Tadatoki (husband to Senhime) was given 100,000 koku separate from his father, and the 50,000 koku Tatsuno Domain was created for his nephew Honda Masakatsu. In 1639, the Honda were transferred to Yamato Kōriyama Domain, and over the next century the domain was ruled by a succession of fudai or Shinpan daimyō : The Okudaira, Echizen-Matsudaira, Sakakibara, until 1749 when the domain was assigned to the Sakai clan. Sakai Tadazumi was daimyō of Maebashi Domain and served as a rōjū in the administration of the shogunate. Maebashi was subject to frequent flooding and the Sakai clan's finances had collapsed due to the costs of maintaining the castle along with expenses pertaining to the office of rōjū and Sakai Sadazumi's prolific spending. He used his influence to secure a transfer from Maebashi to Himeji, which had the same kokudaka, but which he thought would be far more productive. However, a drought occurred in the previous year, and in the summer of the transfer two typhoons caused floods and heat damage. Rumors of tax increases to pay for the transfer resulted in a large-sale peasant revolt. The Sakai survived this crisis and ruled Himeji to the end of the Meiji period.

In the Bakumatsu period, the domain was a major supporter of the shogunate. Sakai Tadatoshi was a rōjū and at the start of the Boshin War was in the retinue of Shogun Tokugawa Yoshinobu at Osaka Castle. During the Battle of Toba-Fushimi, he fled Osaka by ship back to Edo with the shogun, and the Meiji government declared Himeji to be an "enemy of the throne". His vassals surrendered Himeji Castle to imperial forces without a fight, and after the capture of Edo by imperial forces a few months later, he resigned his position and went to live with a cadet branch of the clan which ruled Isesaki Domain in Kōzuke Province.

In 1871, with the abolition of the han system, Himeji Domain became Himeji Prefecture, and was incorporated into Hyōgo prefecture via Shikama Prefecture. The Sakai family became a count in the kazoku peerage system in 1884.

== Holdings at the end of the Edo period ==
As with most domains in the han system, Himeji Domain consisted of several discontinuous territories calculated to provide the assigned kokudaka, based on periodic cadastral surveys and projected agricultural yields.

- Harima Province
  - 95 villages in Kako District
  - 111 villages in Innami District
  - 22 villages in Katō District
  - 9 villages in Kasai District
  - 64 villages in Jintō District
  - 39 villages in Jinsai District
  - 70 villages in Shikitō District
  - 1 village in Ittō District
  - 1 village in Issai District

== List of daimyō ==
#	Name	Tenure	Courtesy title	Court Rank	kokudaka
Ikeda clan, 1616-1617 (Tozama)
1	Ikeda Terumasa (池田輝政)	1600 - 1613	Ukon e no shōshō (右近衛少将)	Senior 4th Rank, Lower Grade ( 正四位下)	520,000 koku
2	Ikeda Toshitaka (池田利隆)	1613 - 1616	Musashi-no-kami (武蔵守); Jijū (侍従)	Junior 4th Rank, Lower Grade (従四位下)	520,000 koku
3	Ikeda Mitsumasa (池田光政)	1616 - 1617	Ukon e no shōshō (右近衛少将)	Junior 4th Rank, Lower Grade (従四位下)	520,000 koku
Honda clan, 1617-1639 (Fudai)
1	Honda Tadamasa (本多忠政)	1617 - 1631	Mino-no-kami (美濃守); Jijū (侍従)	Junior 4th Rank, Lower Grade (従四位下)	150,000 koku
2	Matsudaira Tadatomo (本多政朝)	1631 - 1638	Kai-no-kami (甲斐守); Jijū (侍従)	Junior 4th Rank, Lower Grade (従四位下)	150,000 koku
3	Honda Masakatsu (本多政勝)	1638 - 1639	Naiki (内記); Jijū (侍従)	Junior 4th Rank, Lower Grade (従四位下)	150,000 koku
Okudaira-Matsudaira clan, 1639-1648 (Fudai)
1	Matsudaira Tadaaki (松平忠明)	1639 - 1644	Shimosa-no-kami (下総守); Jijū (侍従)	Junior 4th Rank, Lower Grade (従四位下)	150,000 koku
2	Matsudaira Tadahiro (松平忠弘)	1644 - 1648	Shimosa-no-kami (下総守); Jijū (侍従)	Junior 4th Rank, Lower Grade (従四位下)	150,000 koku
Echizen-Matsudaira clan, 1648-1649 (Shinpan)
1	Matsudaira Naomoto (松平直基)	1648 - 1648	Yamato-no-kami (大和守)	Junior 4th Rank, Lower Grade (従四位下)	150,000 koku
2	Matsudaira Naonori (松平直矩)	1648 - 1649	Yamato-no-kami (大和守)	Junior 4th Rank, Lower Grade (従四位下)	150,000 koku
Sakakibara clan, 1649-1667 (Fudai)
1	Sakakibara Tadatsugu (榊原忠次)	1649 - 1665	Shikubu-no-taiyu (式部大輔)	Junior 4th Rank, Lower Grade (従四位下)	150,000 koku
2	Sakakibara Masafusa (榊原政房)	1665 - 1667	Shikubu-no-taifu (式部大輔)	Junior 4th Rank, Lower Grade (従四位下)	150,000 koku
3	Sakakibara Masamichi (榊原政倫)	-none-	-none-	150,000 koku	
Echizen-Matsudaira clan, 1667-1682 (Shinpan)
1	Matsudaira Naonori (松平直矩)	1667 - 1682	Yamato-no-kami (大和守)	Junior 4th Rank, Lower Grade (従四位下)	150,000 koku
Honda clan, 1681-1704 (Fudai)
1	Honda Tadakuni (本多忠国)	1681 - 1704	Nakatsukasa-no-taifu (中務大輔)	Junior 4th Rank, Lower Grade (従四位下)	150,000 koku
2	Honda Tadataka (本多忠孝)	1704 - 1704	-none-	-none-	150,000 koku
Sakakibara clan, 1704-1741 (Fudai)
1	Sakakibara Masakuni (榊原政邦)	1704 - 1726	Shikubu-no-taiyu (式部大輔)	Junior 4th Rank, Lower Grade (従四位下)	150,000 koku
2	Sakakibara Masasuke (榊原政祐)	1726 - 1732	Shikubu-no-taiyu (式部大輔); Jijū (侍従)	Junior 4th Rank, Lower Grade (従四位下)	150,000 koku
3	Sakakibara Masamine (榊原政岑)	1732 - 1741	Shikubu-no-taiyu (式部大輔)	Junior 4th Rank, Lower Grade (従四位下)	150,000 koku
4	Sakakibara Masazumi (榊原政純)	1741 - 1741	-none-	-none-	150,000 koku
Echizen-Matsudaira clan, 1741-1749 (Shinpan)
1	Matsudaira Akinori (松平明矩)	1741 - 1748	Yamato-no-kami (大和守); Jijū (侍従)	Junior 4th Rank, Lower Grade (従四位下)	150,000 koku
2	Matsudaira Tomonori (松平朝)	1748 - 1749	Yamato-no-kami (大和守); Jijū (侍従)	Junior 4th Rank, Lower Grade (従四位下)	150,000 koku
Sakai clan, 1749-1871 (Fudai)
1	Sakai Tadazumi (酒井忠恭)	1749 - 1772	Sakon e-no-shōshō (左近衛少将); Jijū (侍従)	Junior 4th Rank, Lower Grade (従四位下)	150,000 koku
2	Sakai Tadazane (酒井忠以)	1772 - 1790	Uta-no-kami (雅楽頭); Jijū (侍従)	Junior 4th Rank, Lower Grade (従四位下)	150,000 koku
3	Sakai Tadahiro (酒井忠道)	1790 - 1814	Kazoe-no-kami (主計頭); Jijū (侍従)	Junior 4th Rank, Lower Grade (従四位下)	150,000 koku
4	Sakai Tadamitsu (酒井忠実)	1814 - 1835	Uta-no-kami (雅楽頭); Jijū (侍従)	Junior 4th Rank, Lower Grade (従四位下)	150,000 koku
5	Sakai Tadanori (酒井忠学)	1835 - 1844	Uta-no-kami (雅楽頭); Jijū (侍従)	Junior 4th Rank, Lower Grade (従四位下)	150,000 koku
6	Sakai Tadatomi (酒井忠宝)	1844 - 1853	Uta-no-kami (雅楽頭); Jijū (侍従)	Junior 4th Rank, Lower Grade (従四位下)	150,000 koku
7	Sakai Tadateru (酒井忠顕)	1853 - 1860	Uta-no-kami (雅楽頭); Jijū (侍従)	Junior 4th Rank, Lower Grade (従四位下)	150,000 koku
8	Sakai Tadashige (酒井忠績)	1860 - 1867	Uta-no-kami (雅楽頭); Jijū (侍従)	Junior 4th Rank, Lower Grade (従四位下)	150,000 koku
9	Sakai Tadatoshi (酒井忠惇)	1867 - 1868	Uta-no-kami (雅楽頭); Jijū (侍従)	Junior 3rd Rank, (従三位)	150,000 koku
10	Sakai Tadakuni (酒井忠邦)	1868 - 1871	Uta-no-kami (雅楽頭); Jijū (侍従)	Junior 3rd Rank, (従三位)	150,000 koku

== See also ==
- List of Han
- Abolition of the han system
