= Castle town =

Settlement built adjacent to or surrounding a castle

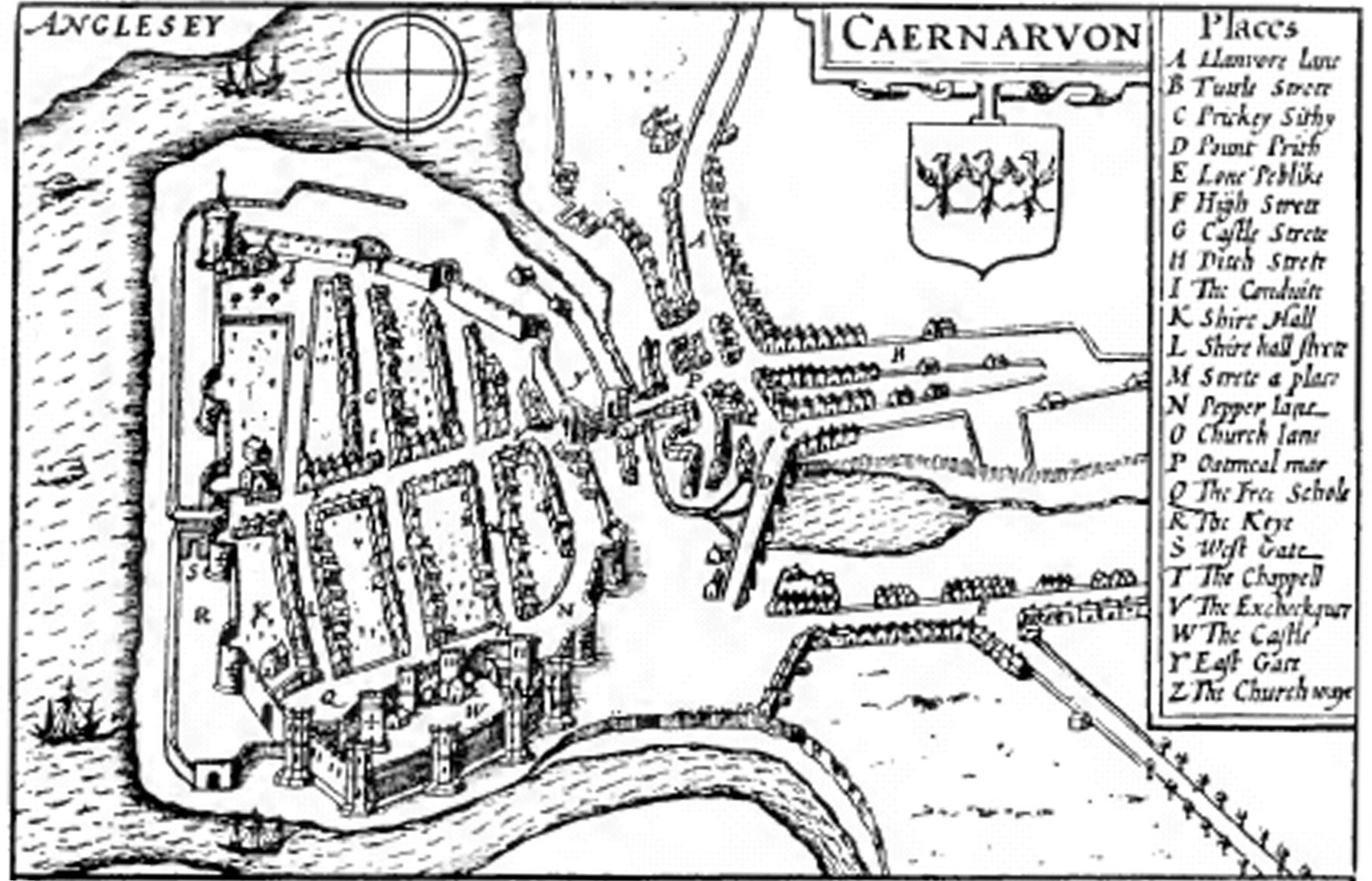
Map of Caernarfon in 1610 by John Speed, a classic example of a castle town

A castle town is a settlement built adjacent to or surrounding a castle. Castle towns were common in Medieval Europe. Castle towns were sometimes made by the people who made the castle. Some examples include small towns like Alnwick and Arundel, which are still dominated by their castles. In Western Europe, and England particularly, it is common for cities and towns that were not castle towns to instead have been organized around cathedrals.

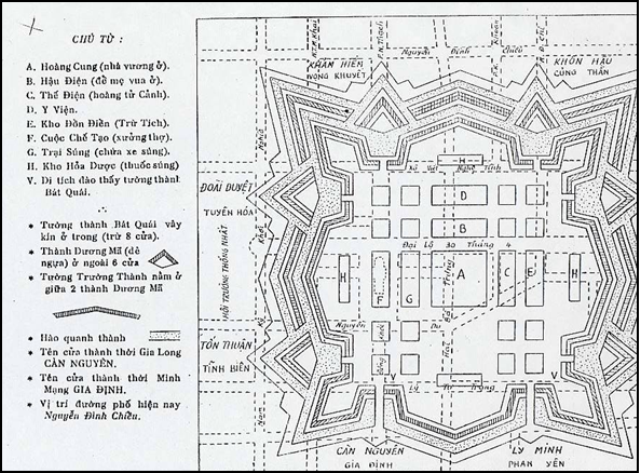
Map of the Citadel of Saigon (Bagua citadel) before 1835.

Towns organized around Japanese castles are called jōkamachi (城下町). Castles are typically built near towns to gain and equip supplies.

== See also ==
- Castles and Town Walls of King Edward in Gwynedd
- Jōkamachi
- Urban castle
