= Urban castle =

Castle located within medieval town

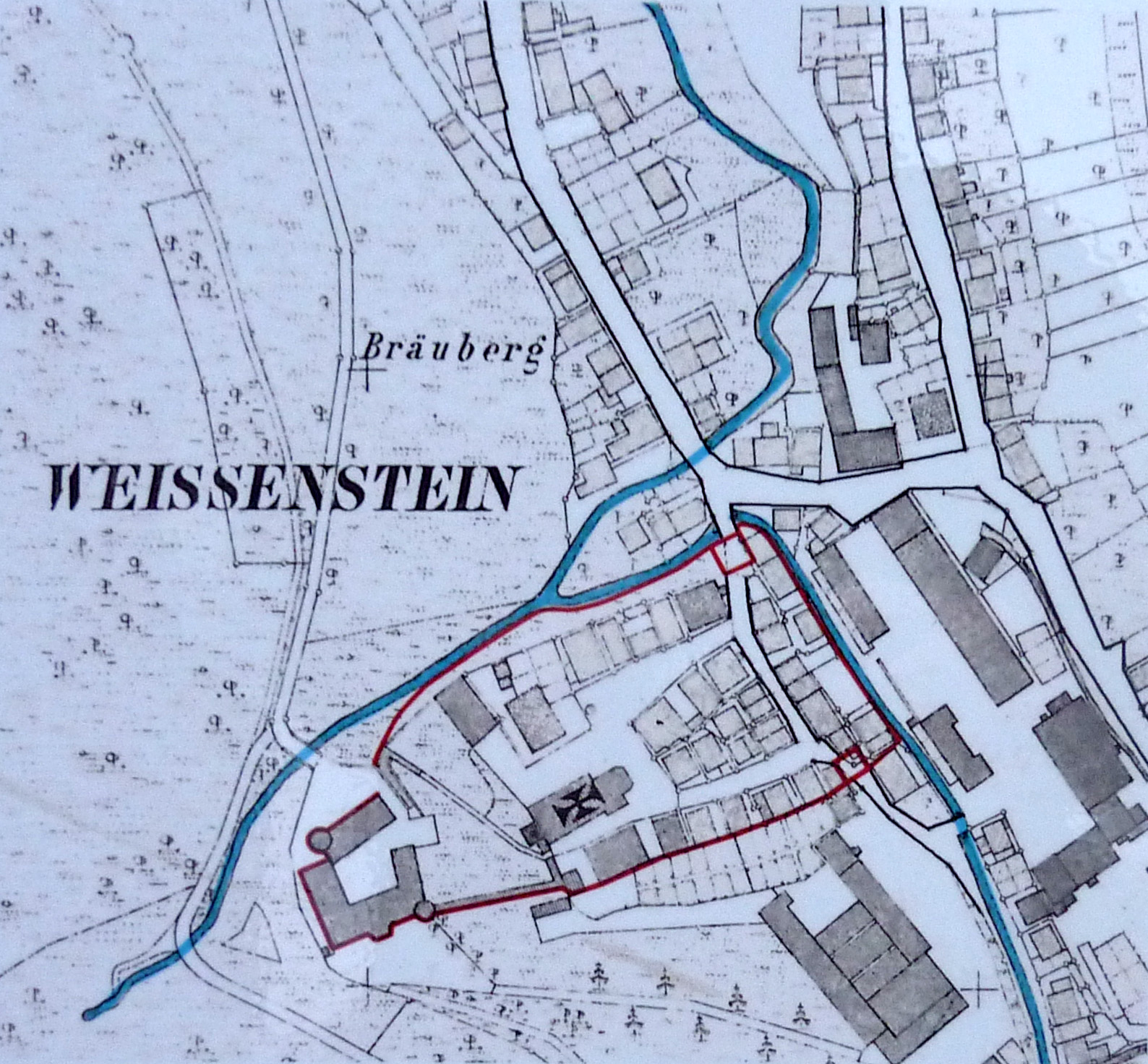
Example of an urban castle: the old fortification of Weißenstein with the castle in the west

An urban castle (German: Stadtburg) is a castle that is located within a medieval town or city or is integrated into its fortifications.

In most cases, the town or city grew up around or alongside the castle (for example in Halle, Brunswick and Prague), or the castle was built in order to reinforce the defences within or as part of the line of fortification ringing the settlement as, for example, at Erfurt.

== Definitions ==
Creighton draws a distinction between the 'urban castle', where the castle is built in or onto an existing town, and the 'castle borough', "where a primary castle attracts a secondary borough or the two are planned together," although he acknowledges that the division between the two is not always clear-cut.

== Instrument of sovereign power ==
The urban castle was also used as an instrument of power, for example by William the Conqueror in Norman England, or by territorial lords in the Holy Roman Empire when towns in the late Middle Ages were increasingly striving for their independence. In such cases the urban castle was integrated into a strategically favourable point in the city wall so that the lord could enter the castle from the fields outside unhindered by the citizens and, through another gateway in the castle walls facing the city, could leave the castle and enter the city.

== Examples ==
=== Austria ===
- Krems in Lower Austria, has the Gozzoburg, a high mediaeval urban castle.

=== Czech Republic ===
- Prague Castle in Prague

=== Germany ===
There are examples of urban castles in:

- Andernach in Rhineland-Palatinate where the Electoral Cologne Stadtburg (designed as a water castle) as an instrument of power
- Erfurt with its Petersberg Citadel, which is integrated into the defensive system of the old fortified city
- Esslingen am Neckar: the original outposts on the Schönenberg were gradually incorporated into the town fortifications through the construction of branching walls (Schenkelmauern). Due to the geological situation there, the cost was very high.
- Feuchtwangen in Bavaria still has, in the remains of its town walls, a picturesque link to the site of Little Ottingen Castle (Öttingischen Schlösschen), a former water castle, which juts out from the otherwise circular town wall. Later a small hunting lodge was built on the site
- Friedberg in Hesse has an imperial castle
- Horn-Bad Meinberg in North Rhine-Westphalia has Horn Castle, a castle built into the town's defences
- Nuremberg: the double castle is incorporated into the city wall
- Schlitz in Hesse, one of the best-known examples of urban castles in Germany with four castles.
- Warburg has Wartberch Castle.
- Weißenstein with the old castle of Schloss Weißenstein

=== Ethiopia ===
- Emperor Fasilides' Castle (part of the Fasil Ghebbi complex) in Gondar

=== Finland ===
- Turku Castle in Finland

=== Hungary ===
- Buda Castle in Budapest
- Sárospatak Castle in Sárospatak

=== Poland ===
- Wawel Castle in Kraków (part of the Wawel fortified complex of the Kraków Old Town)

=== Romania ===
- Brașov Old Town Fortress, Brașov

=== Slovakia ===
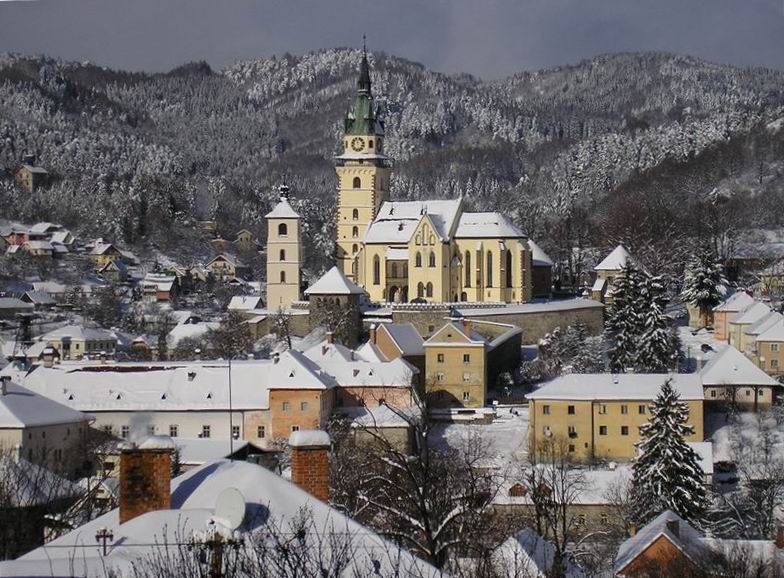
Kremnica with Kremnica Castle, an urban castle (German: Stadtburg) which is situated in the background.

- Bratislava Castle in Bratislava (fortified site history preceding adjacent city)
- Trenčín Castle in Trenčín
- Nitra Castle in Nitra (parallel evolution of the castle and the city since the early Middle Ages)
- Old Castle (Starý zámok) in Banská Štiavnica (secondary Old Town development, late Middle Ages)
- New Castle (Nový zámok) in Banská Štiavnica (secondary Old Town development, Renaissance)
- Kremnica Castle in Kremnica (secondary Old Town development, late Middle Ages)
- Podolínec Castle in Podolínec
- Kežmarok Castle in Kežmarok

=== Ukraine ===
- Uzhhorod Castle in Uzhhorod

=== United Kingdom ===
The Tower of London has been called "the most complete of urban castles", and an "archetypally oppressive castle." Other examples include:

- Baile Hill, York
- Banbury Castle
- Baynard's Castle
- Bristol Castle
- Castle Acre
- Caernarvon Castle
- Conway Castle
- Flint Castle
- Mountfichet Castle
- Oxford Castle
- Rhuddlan Castle

== Gallery ==
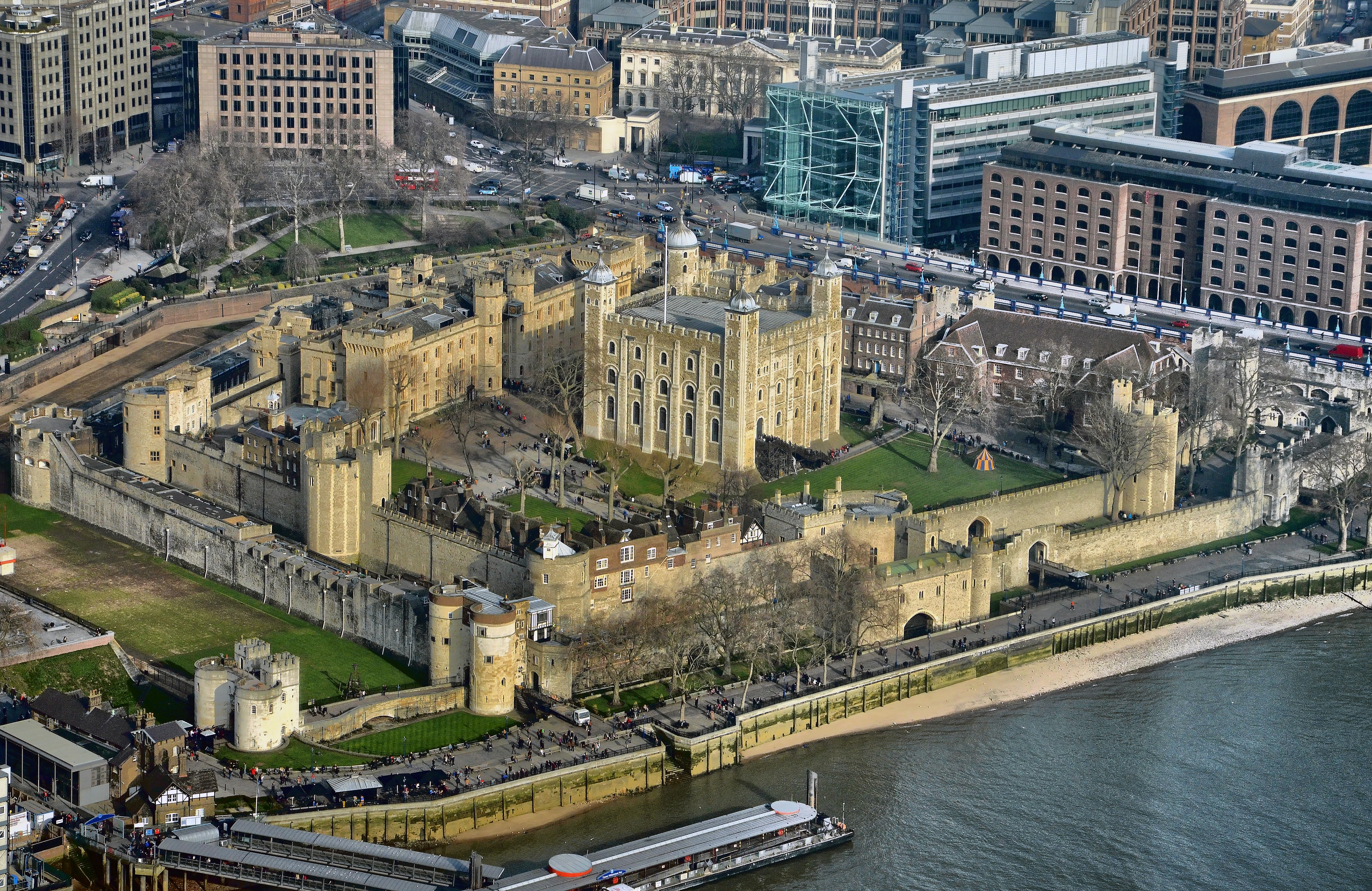
London, United Kingdom

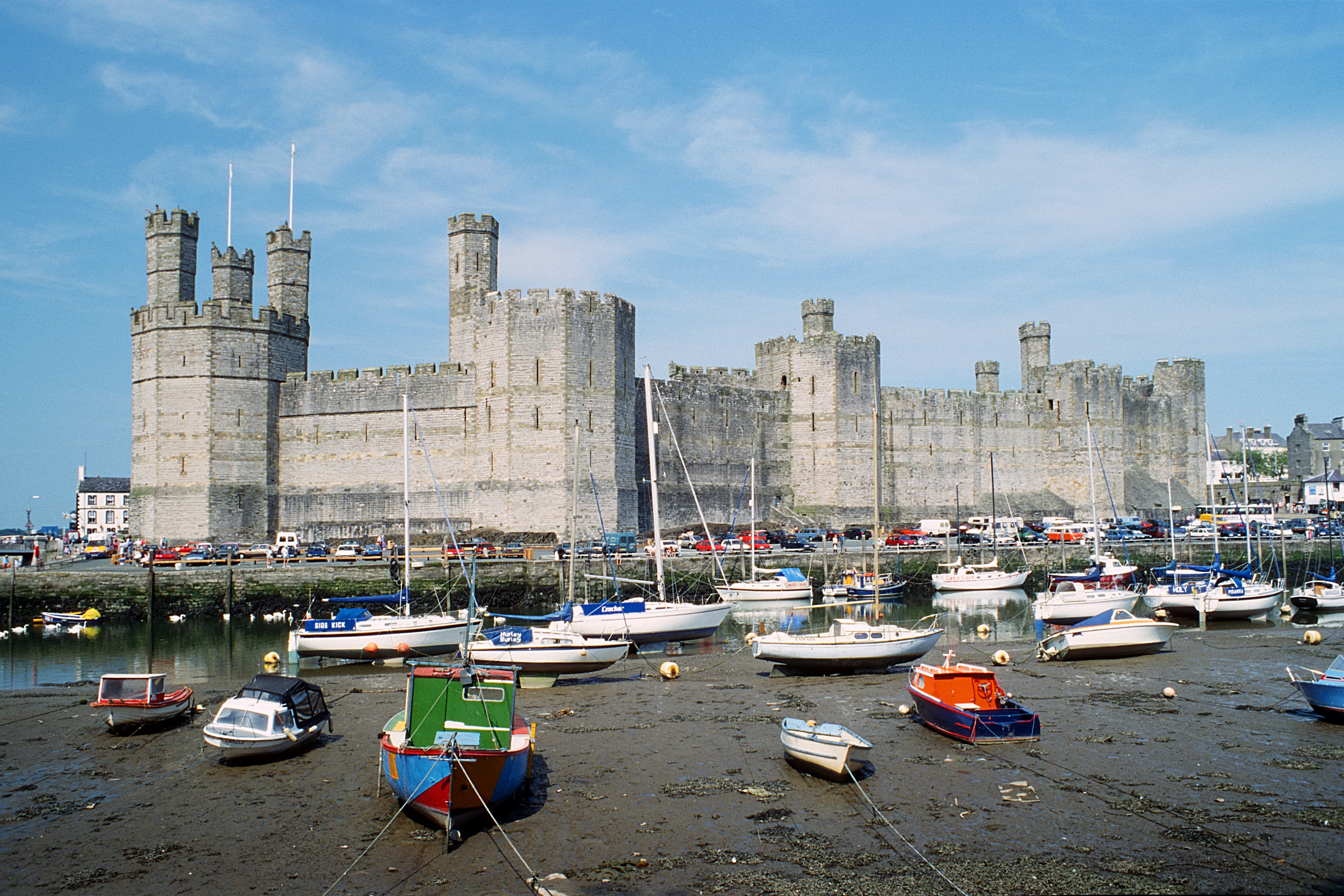
Caernarfon, United Kingdom

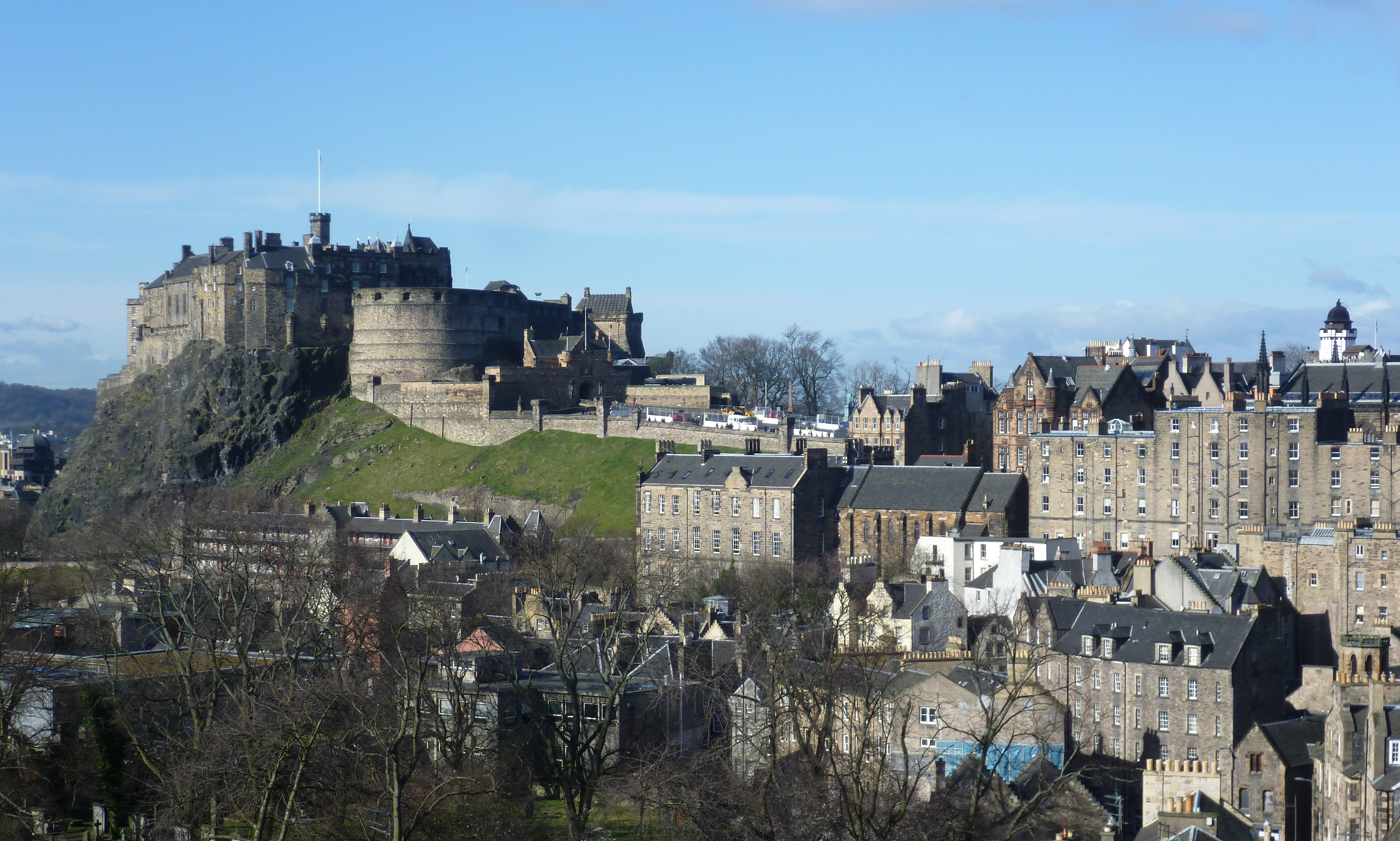
Edinburgh, United Kingdom

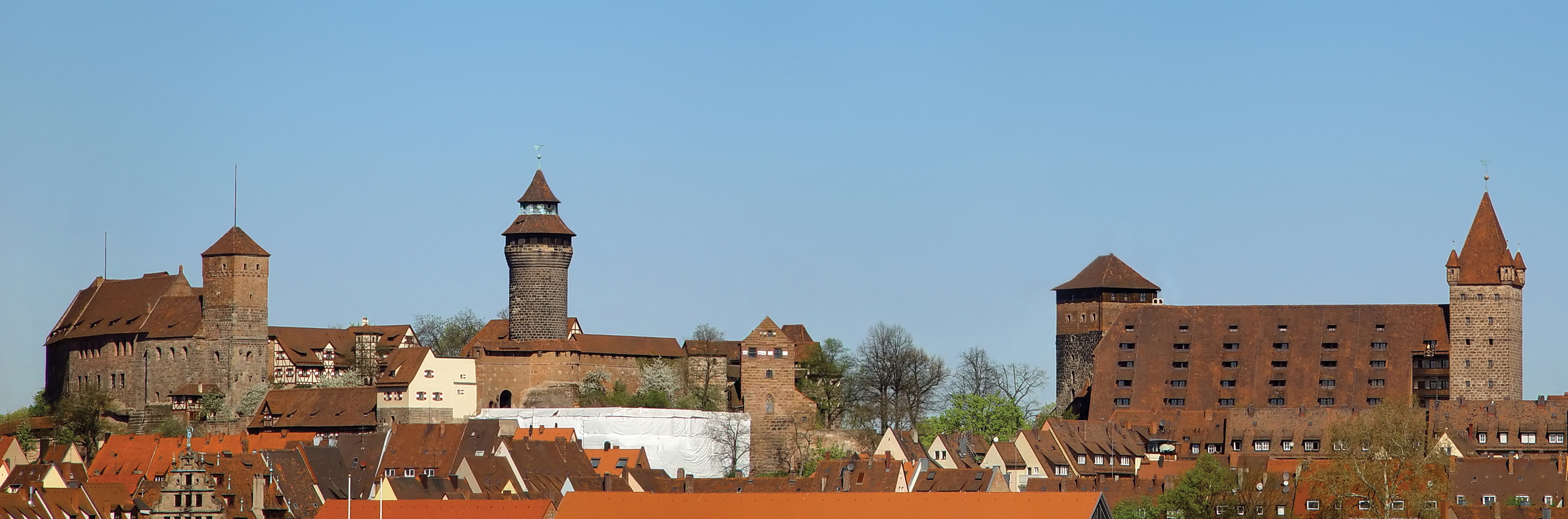
Nuremberg, Germany

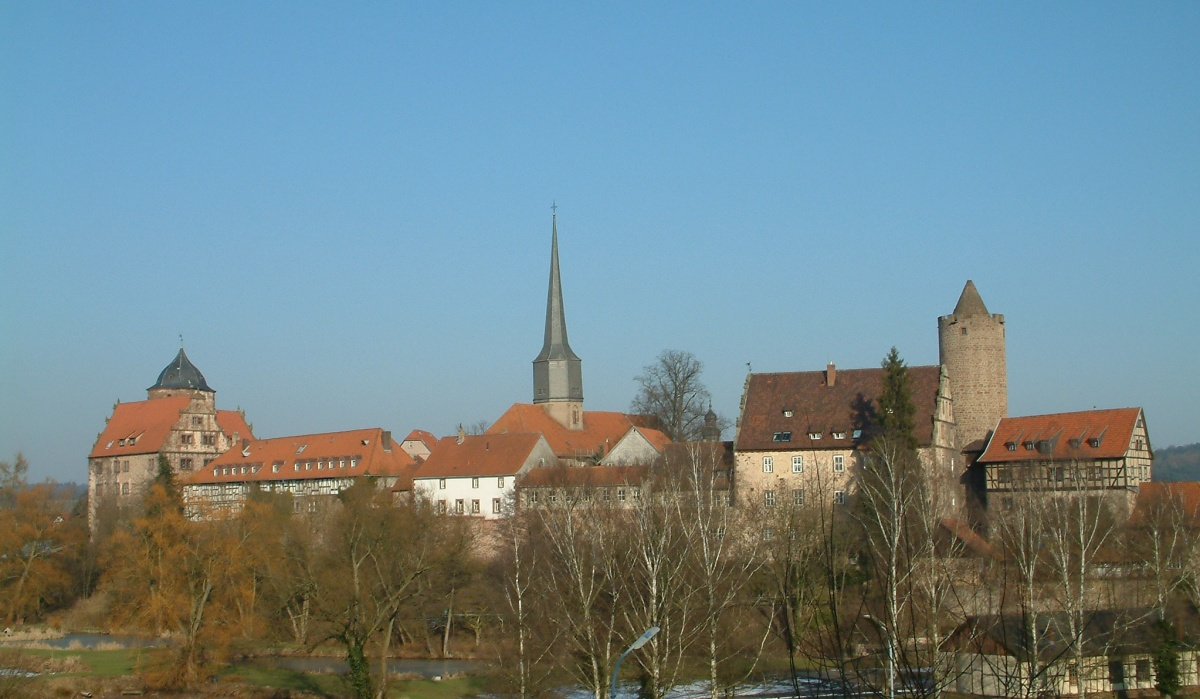
Schlitz, Germany

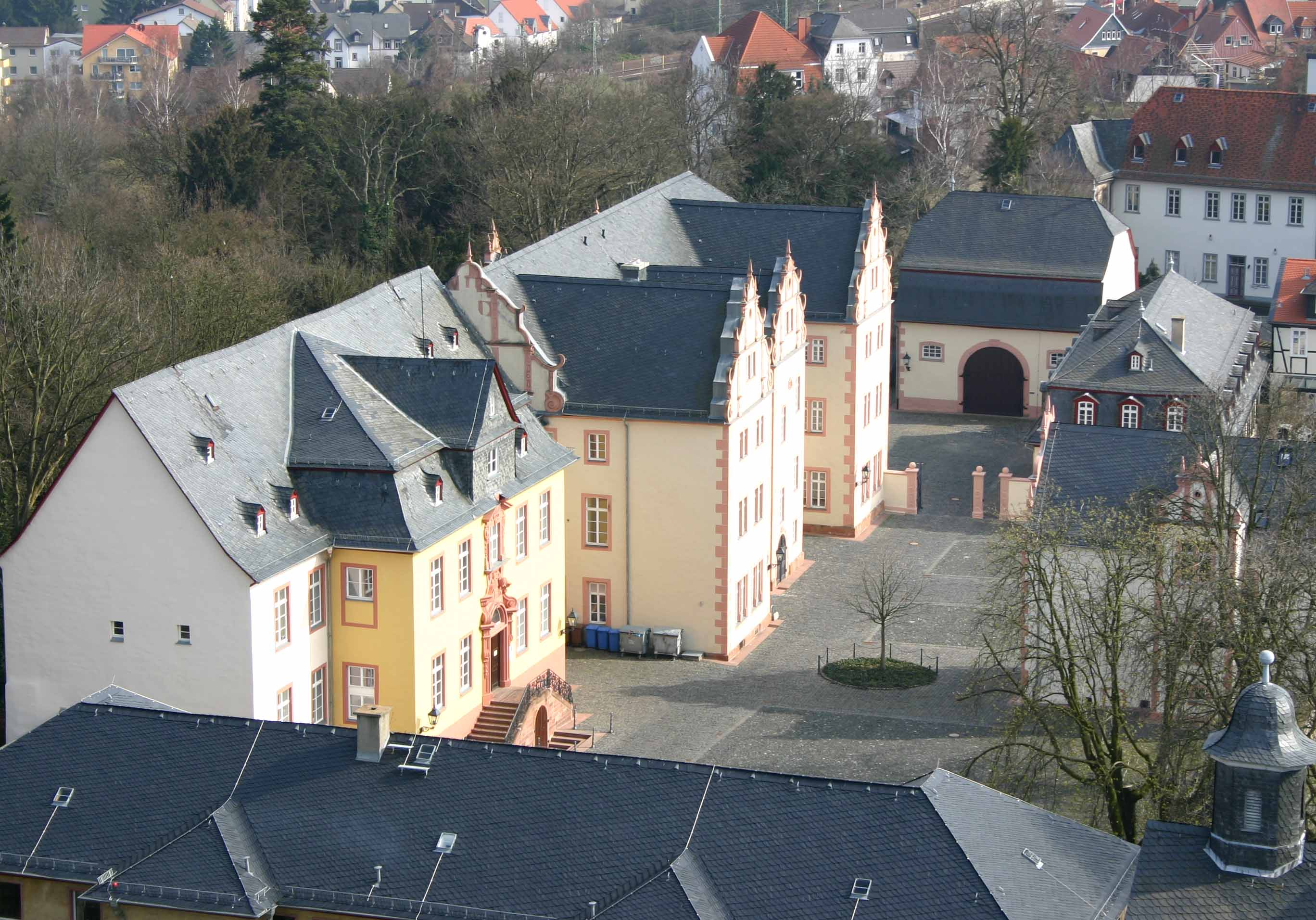
Friedberg, Germany

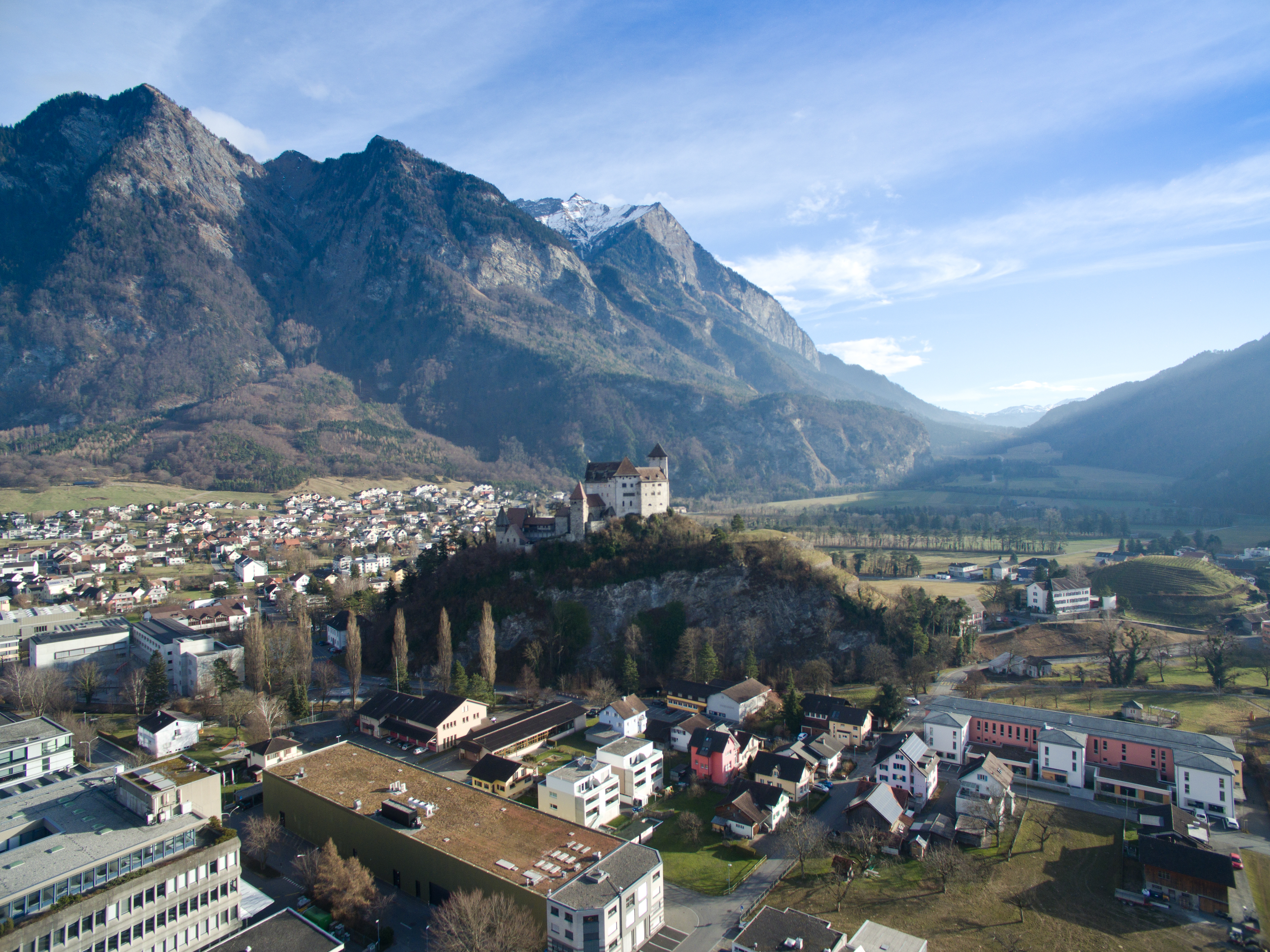
Balzers, Liechtenstein

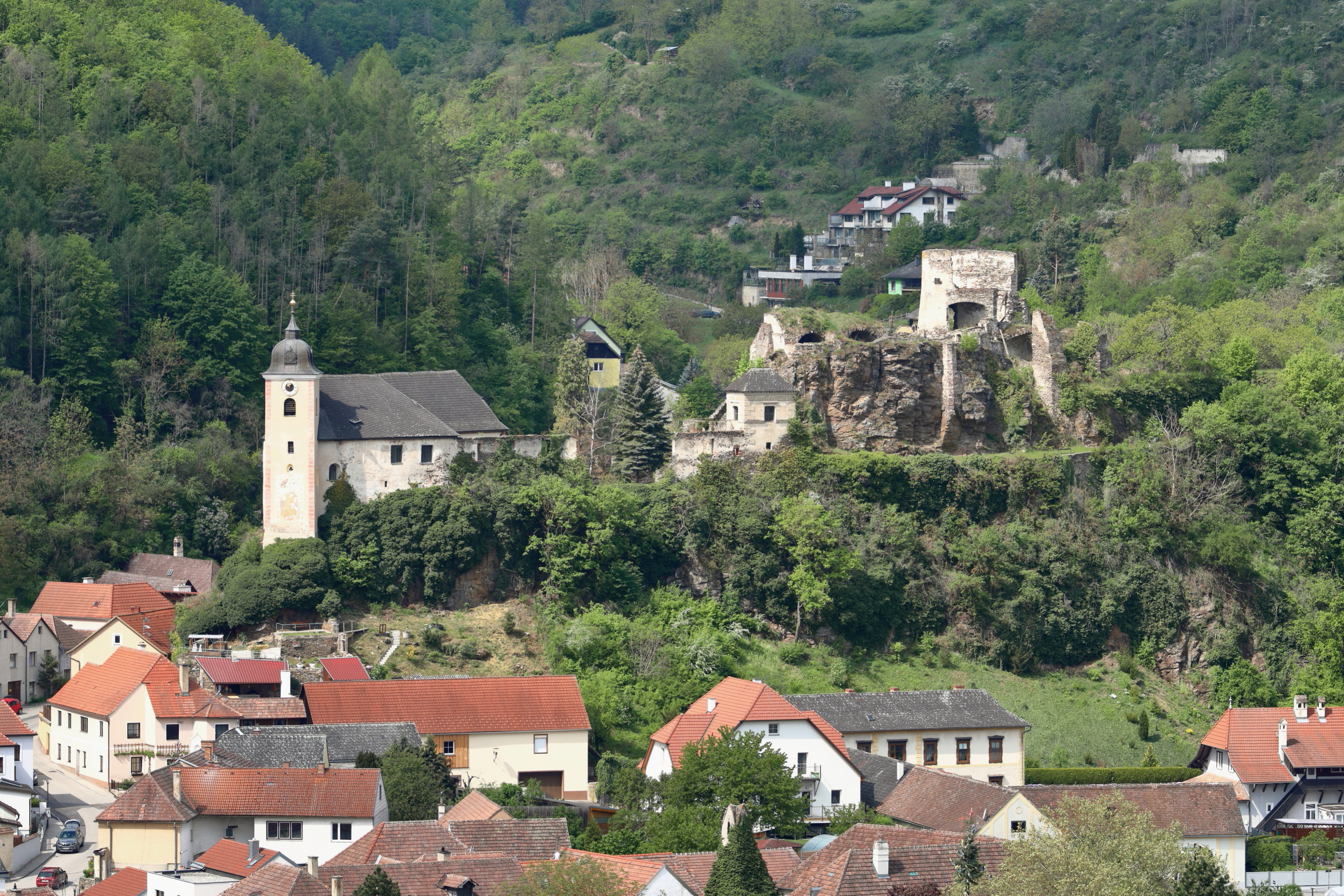
Krems an der Donau, Austria

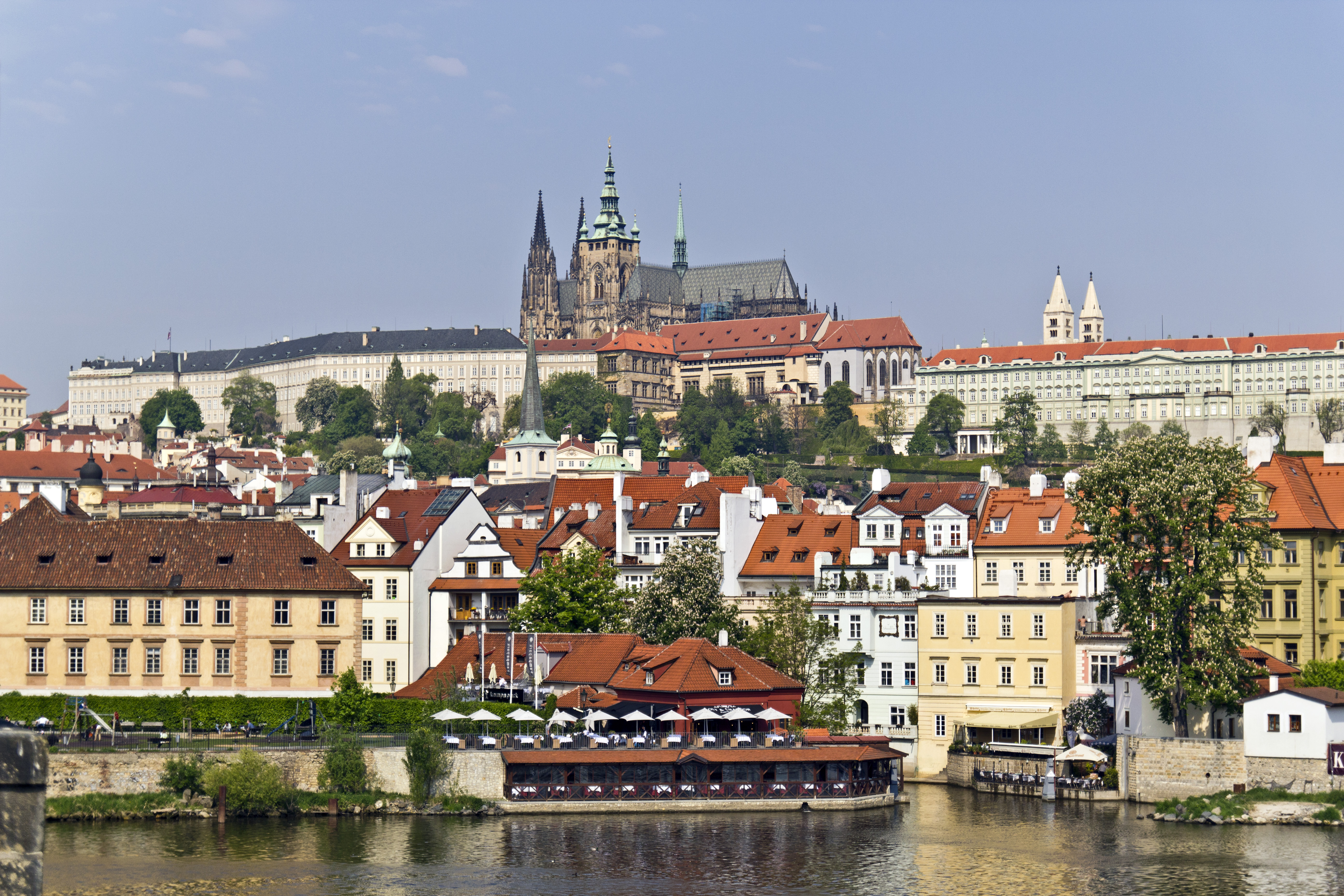
Prague, Czech Republic

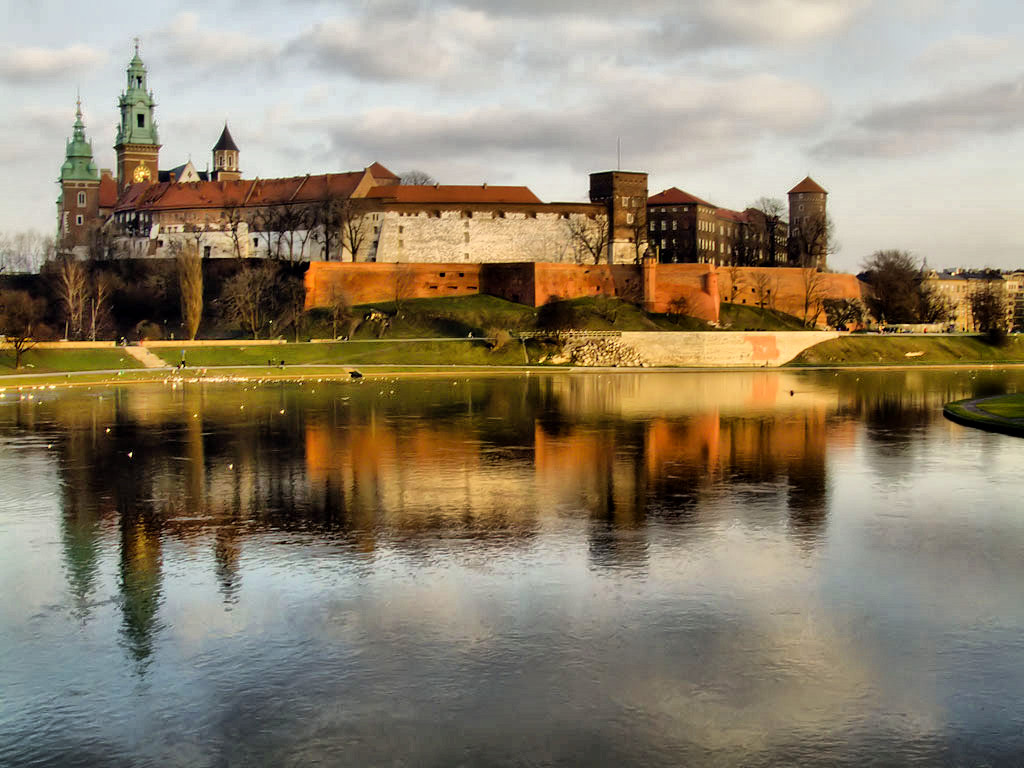
Kraków, Poland

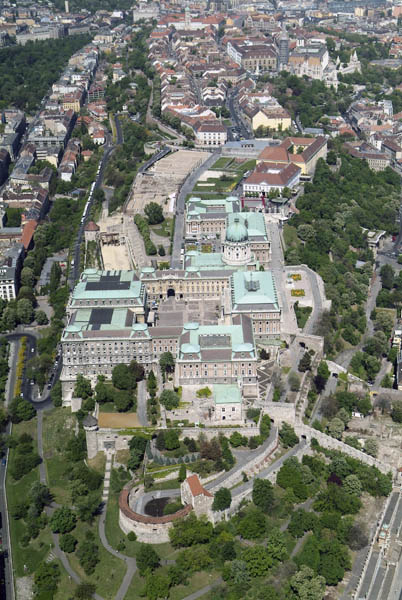
Budapest, Hungary

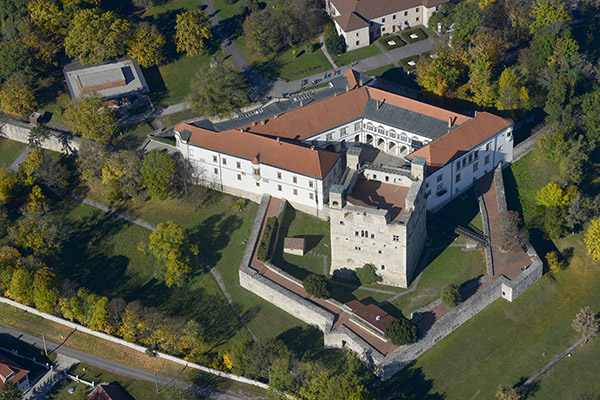
Sárospatak, Hungary

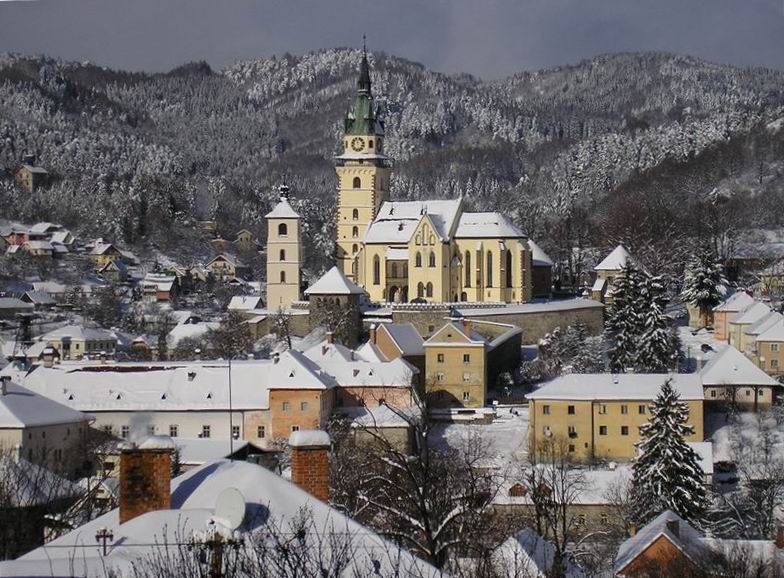
Kremnica, Slovakia

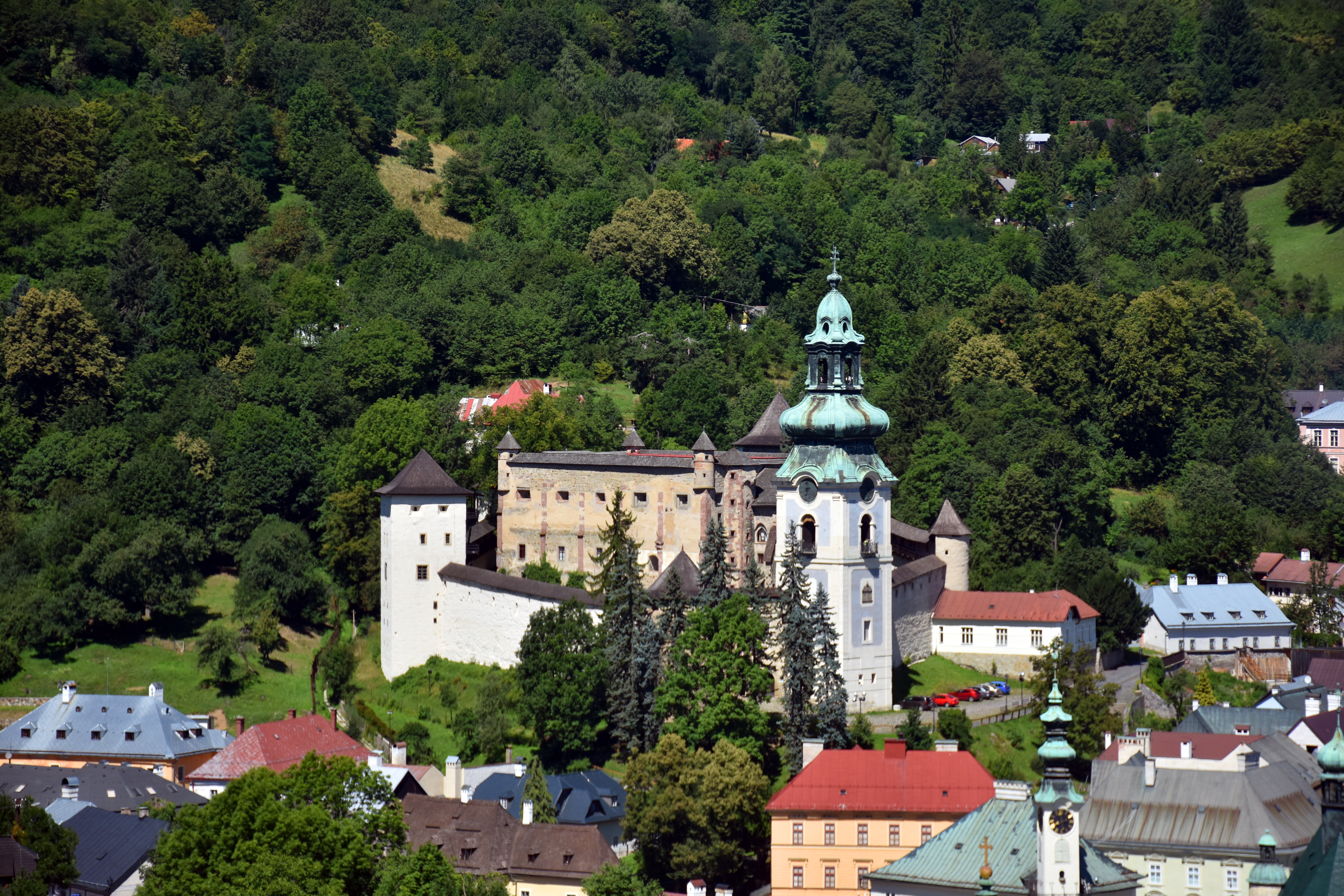
Starý zámok, Banská Štiavnica, Slovakia

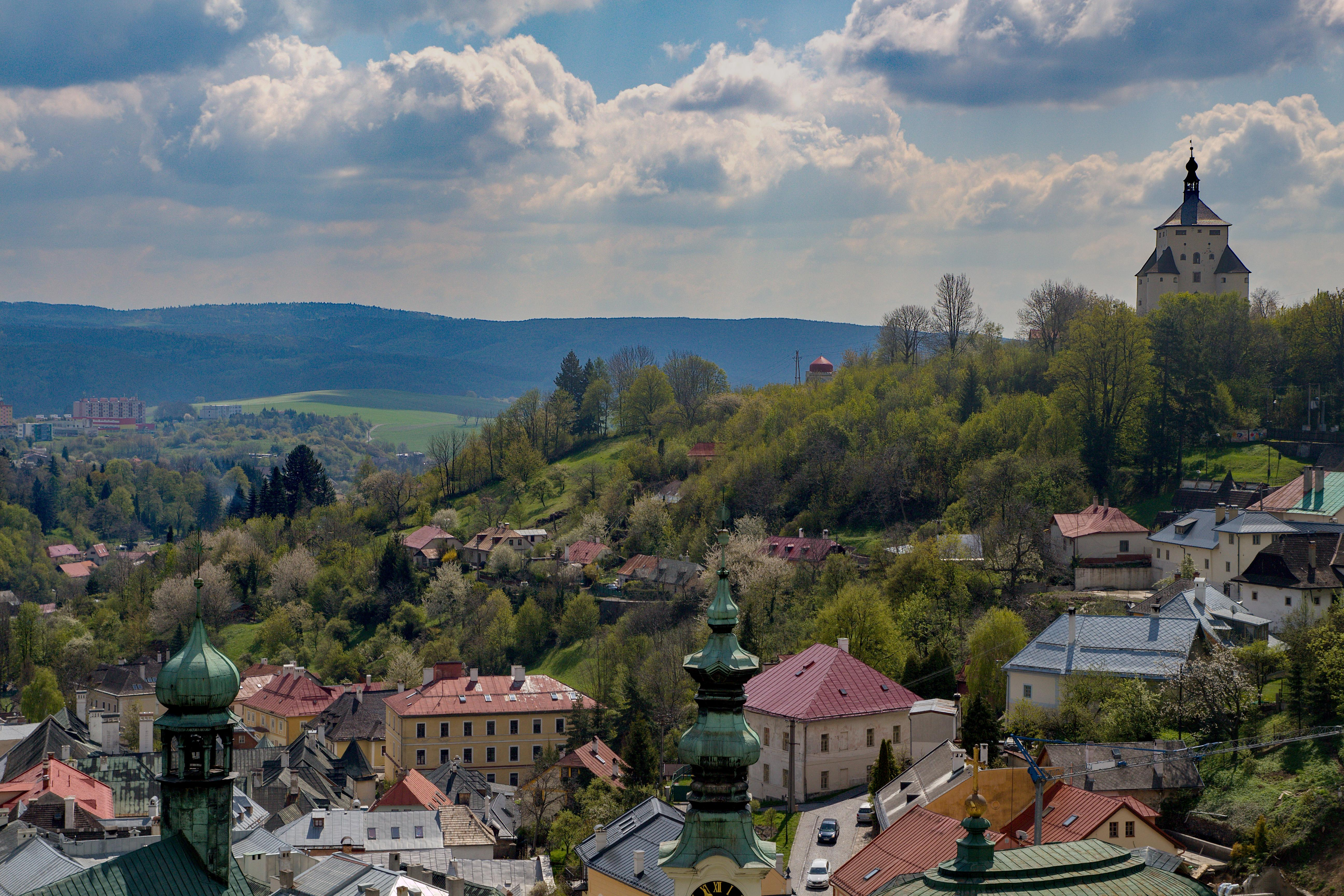
Nový zámok, Banská Štiavnica, Slovakia

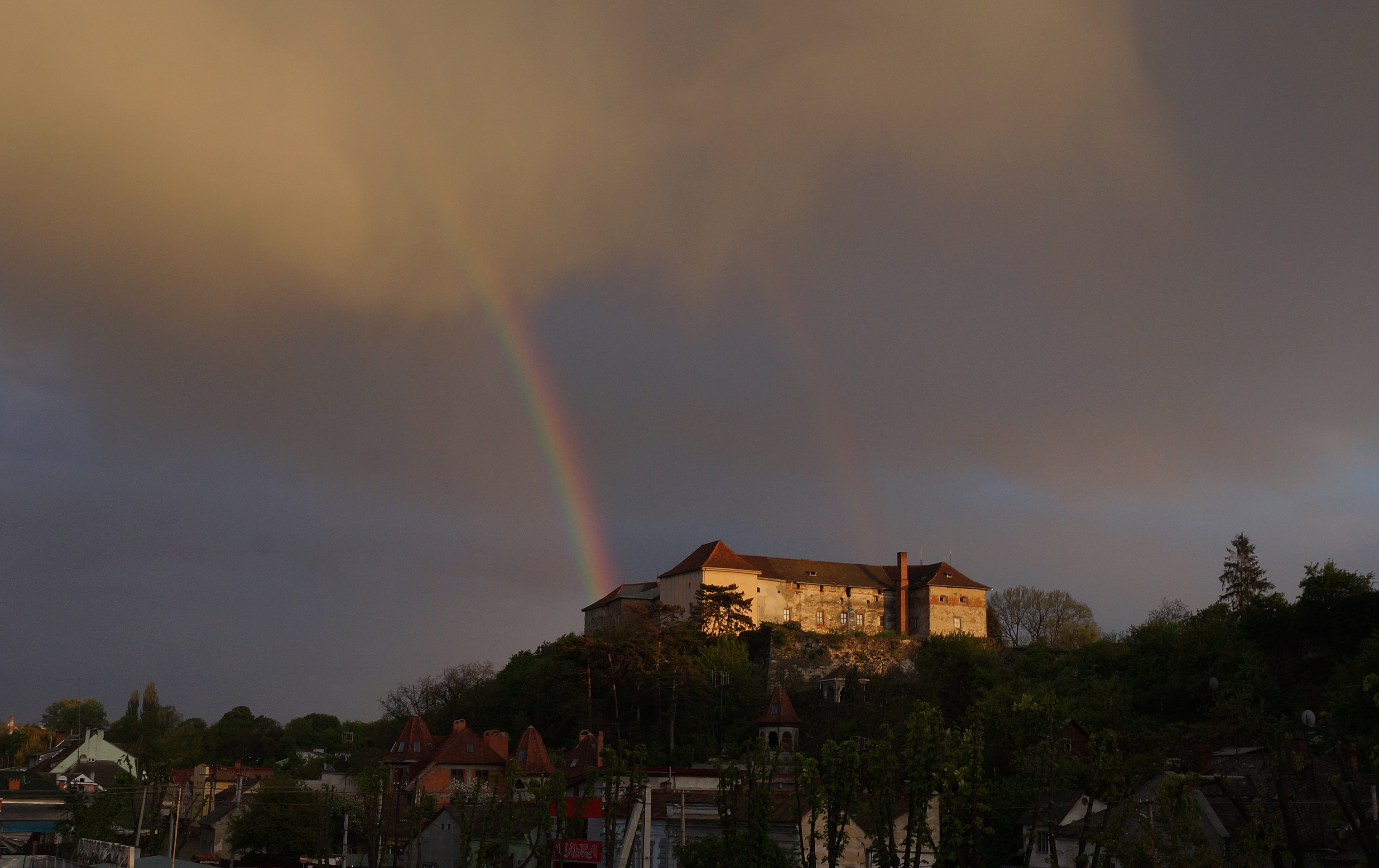
Uzhorod, Ukraine

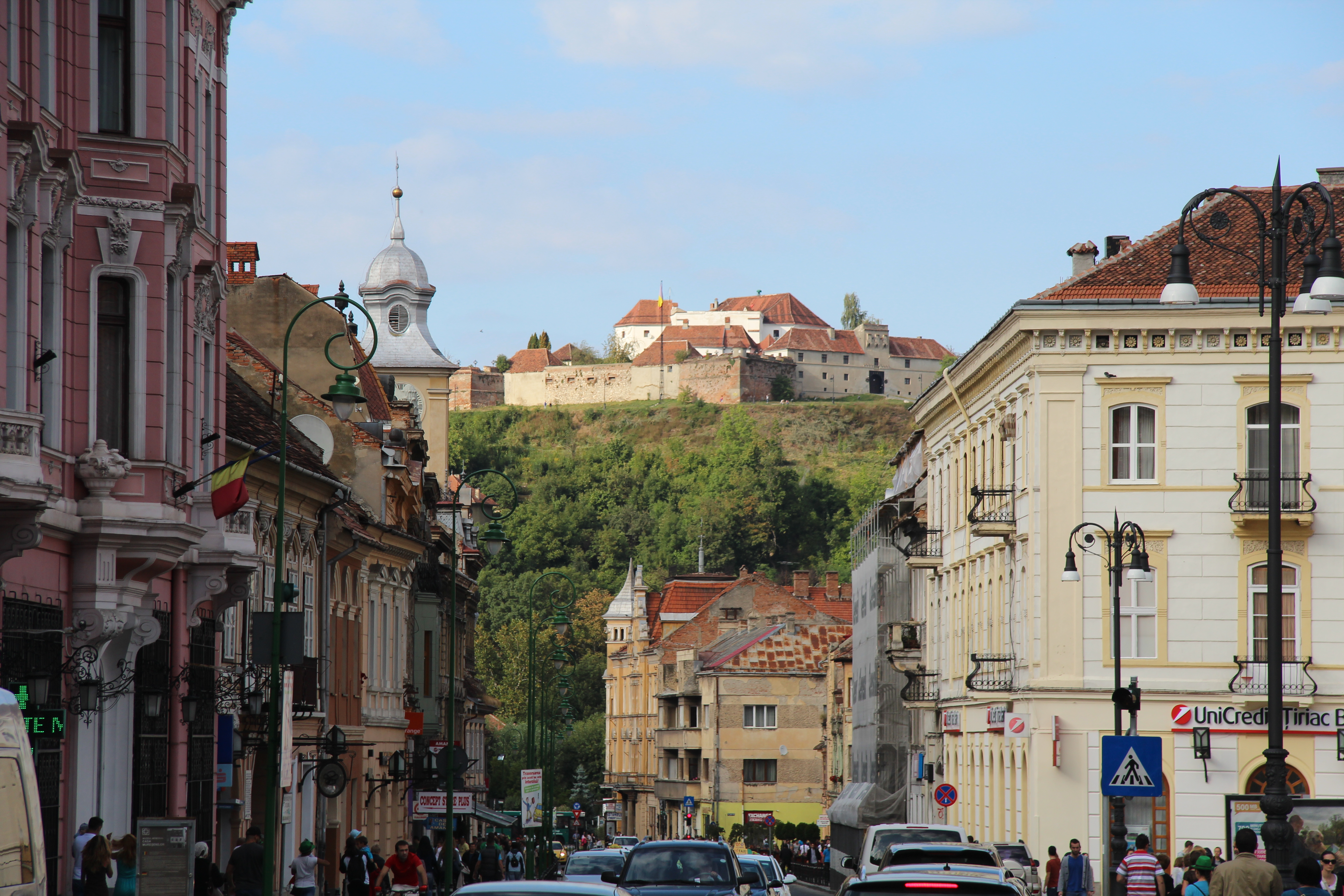
Brașov, Romania

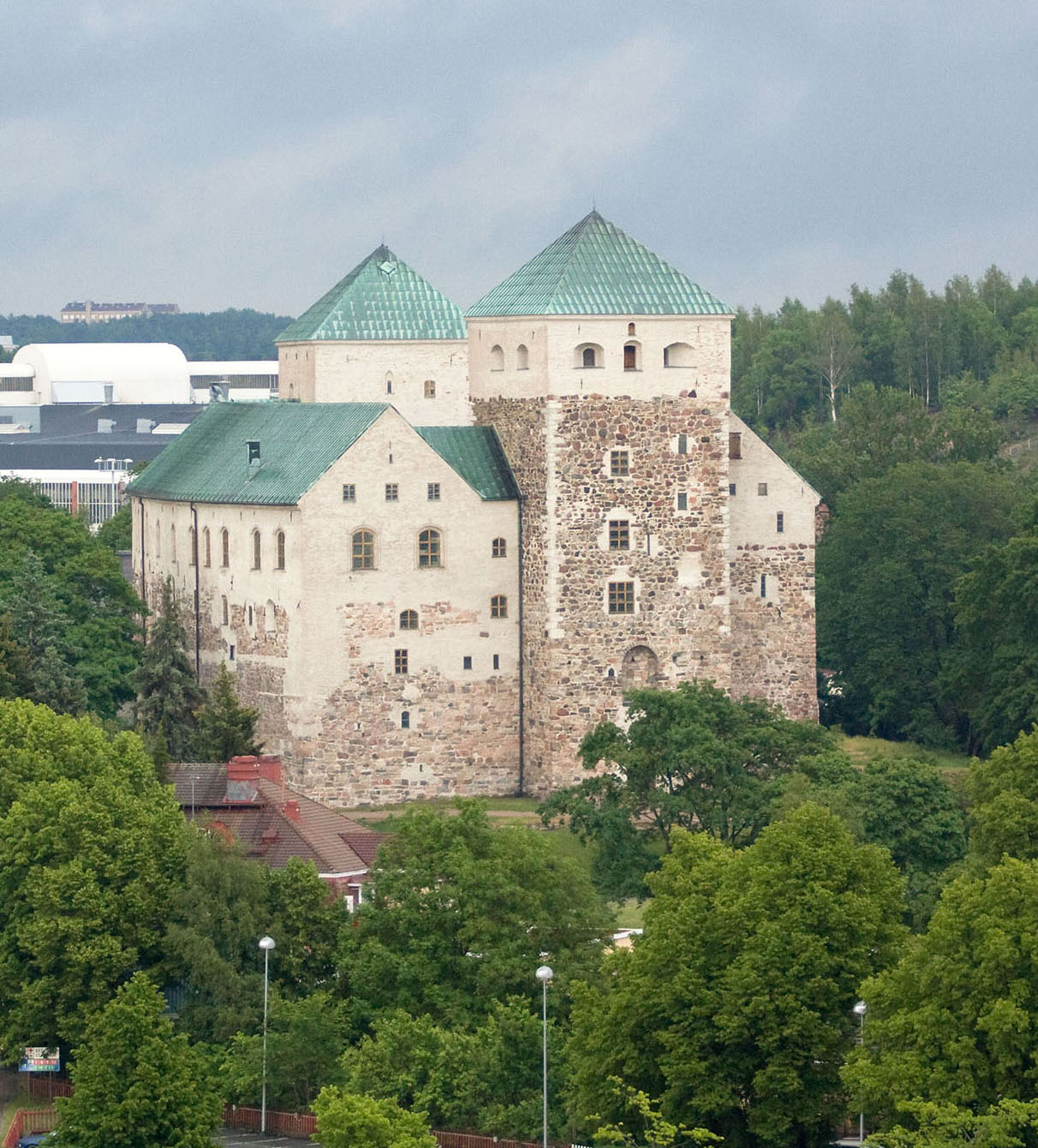
Turku, Finland

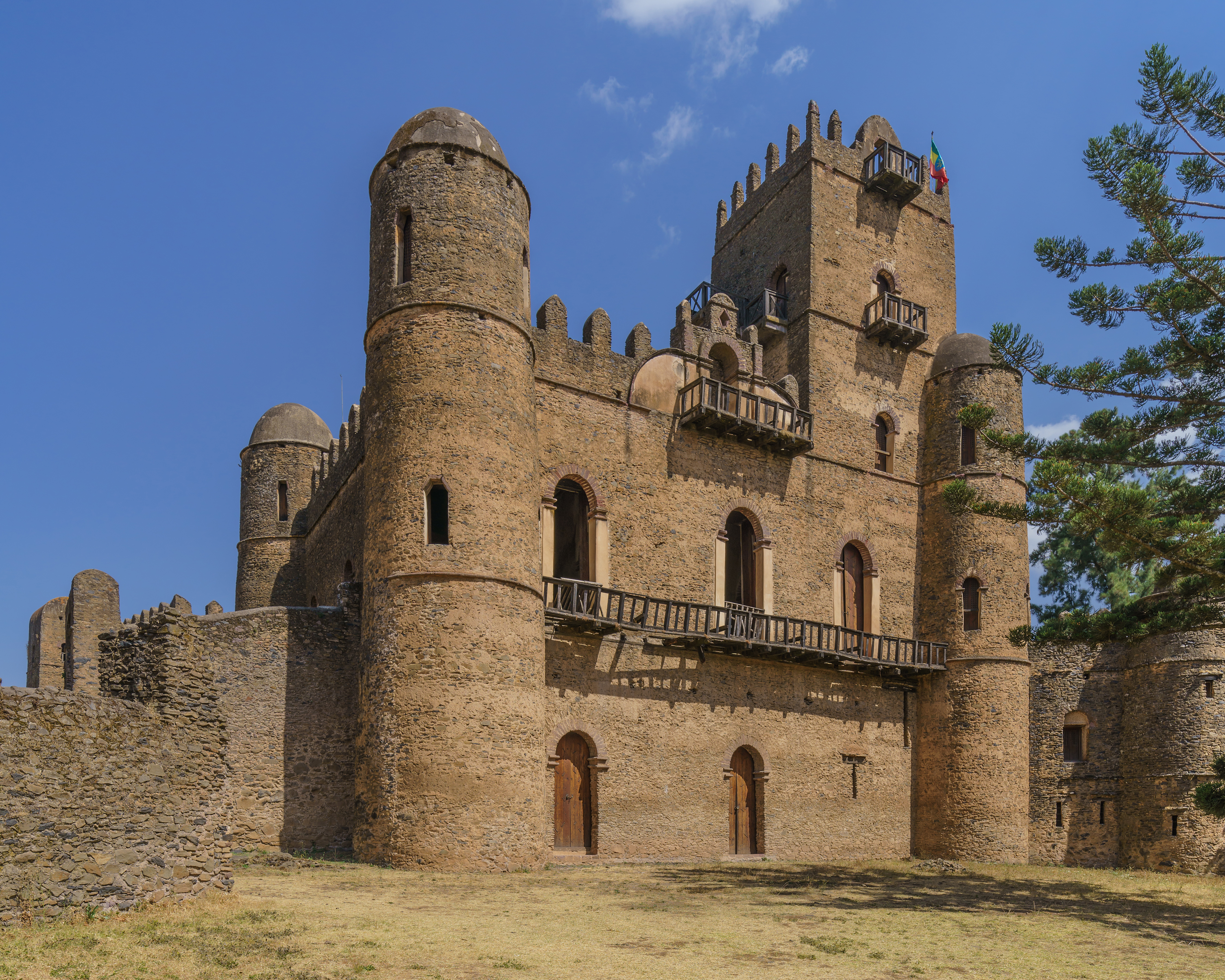
Gondar, Ethiopia
