= Dōjima Rice Exchange =

Center of Japan's rice brokers during the Edo period located in Osaka, Japan

Coordinates: 34.6952°N 135.49867°E

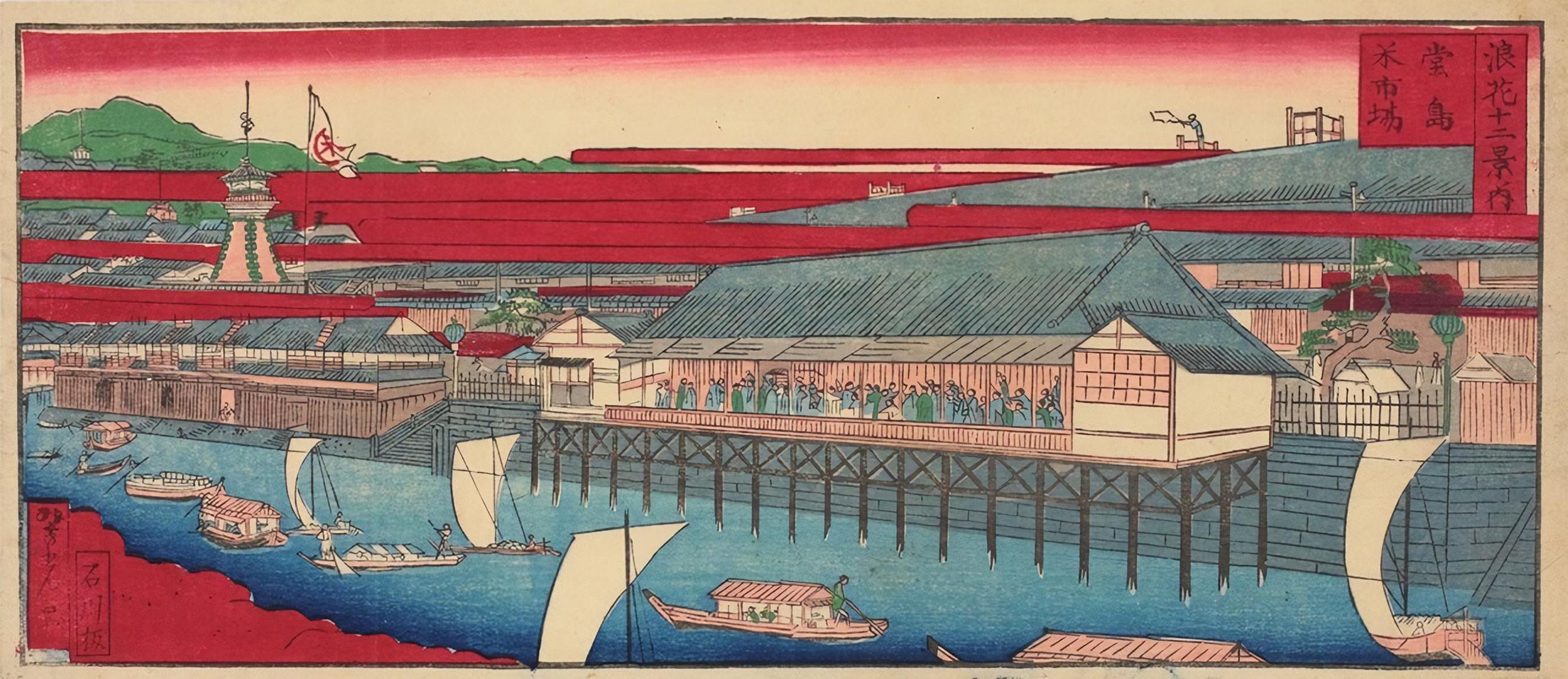
Dōjima Rice Exchange ukiyo-e by Yoshimitsu Sasaki

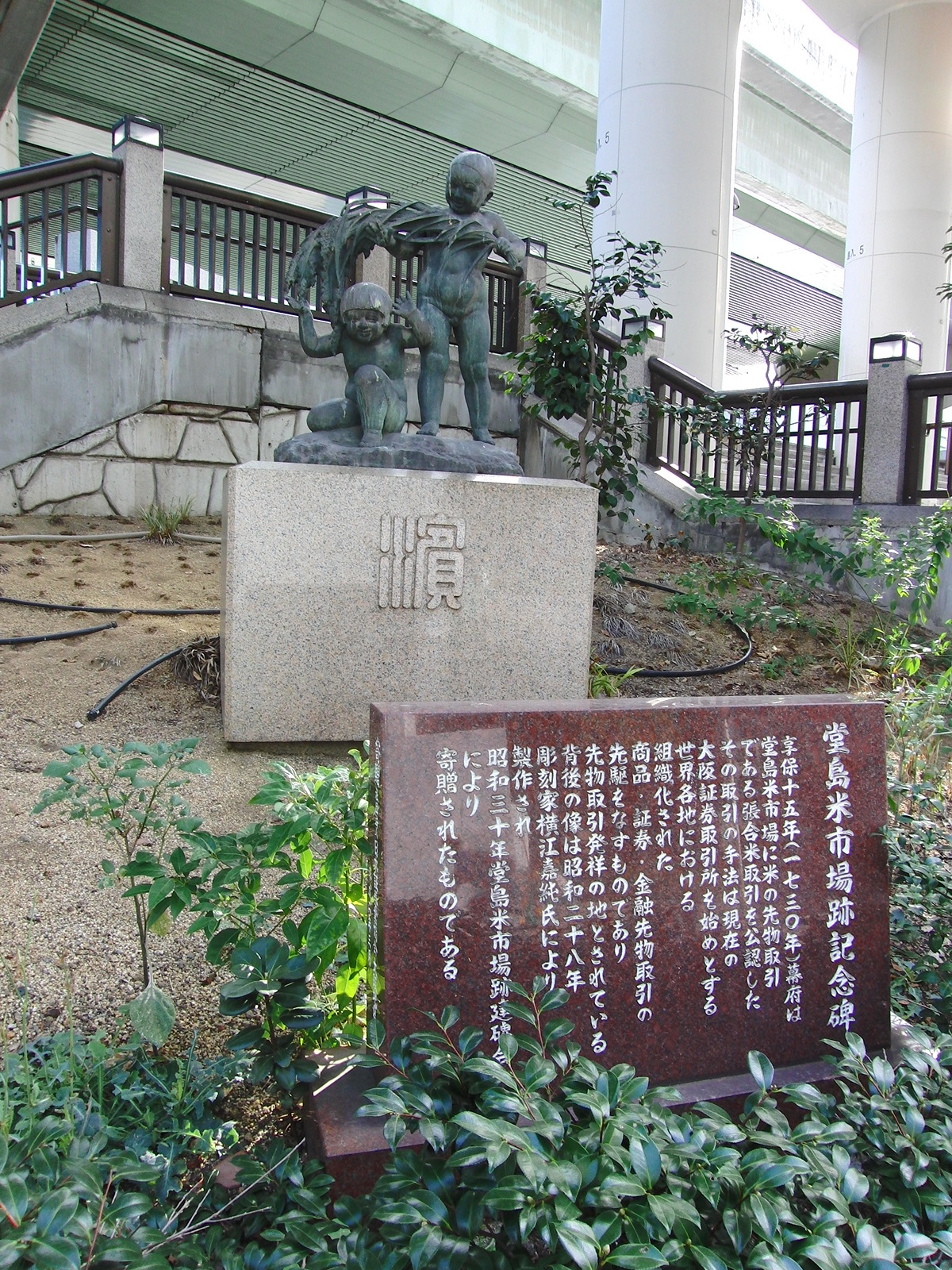
The Dōjima Rice Exchange Monument

The Dōjima Rice Exchange (堂島米市場, Dōjima kome ichiba, 堂島米会所, Dōjima kome kaisho), located in Osaka, was the center of Japan's system of rice brokers, which developed independently and privately in the Edo period and would be seen as the forerunner to a modern banking system. It was first established in 1697, officially sanctioned, sponsored and organized by the shogunate in 1773, reorganized in 1868, and dissolved entirely in 1939, being absorbed into the Government Rice Agency (日本米穀株式会社)(cf.ja:食糧管理制度).

The Japanese economy grew rapidly throughout the 17th century, culminating in the period known as Genroku (1688–1704) during which merchants prospered like never before. It was at this time that rice brokers and moneychangers (両替商, ryōgaeshō) gathered their shops and warehouses in the Dōjima area; the Rice Exchange can be said to have been established in 1697, the year it received a license from the shogunate. Since members of the samurai class, including daimyō (feudal lords) were paid in rice, not cash, the rice brokers and moneychangers played a crucial, and incredibly profitable, role in the emerging early modern economy of Japan. Over the course of the Edo period, the entire economy would not only shift from rice to coin, but would also see the introduction and spread of paper money initiated and facilitated by the men of Dōjima. The year 1710 marks the beginning of this development, which also brought with it the emergence of the concept of trading in futures (延べ米nobemai). The Osaka merchants, like the Kyoto rice brokers three hundred years before, developed an increasingly monopolistic grasp on the rice trade, determining prices not only within Osaka, but in the entire Kinai (Home Provinces) area, and indirectly having a great effect on prices in Edo.

These economic developments among the rice merchants were intricately connected to parallel developments in other trades, and the formation of a number of networks of different types of guilds including kabunakama, rakuichi and rakuza, which developed out of the older guild types known as tonya and za.

In the first years of the 1730s, as the result of poor harvests and trade issues, the exchange rate of rice into coin plummeted. Samurai, whose income was in rice, panicked over the exchange rate into coin, and meanwhile speculators and various conspiracies within the brokers' community played games with the system, keeping vast stores of rice in the warehouses, which ensured low prices. A series of riots against the speculators, and against the conspiratorial, manipulative system as a whole, erupted in 1733; starvation was widespread, and meanwhile, speculators were acting to "corner" the market and to control prices. This was the first of a number of riots, called uchikowashi (打壊し), which would grow in frequency and size over the next century or so. The shogunate set a price floor in 1735, forcing merchants in Edo to sell for no less than one ryō per 1.4 koku, and in Osaka no less than 42 momme per koku. A 10 momme fine was charged to anyone found to have paid less. Over the next fifteen years or so, until roughly 1750, the shogunate stepped in on a number of occasions to attempt to stabilize or control the economy. Though in 1730 the government budget as a whole was in balance (expenditures = revenue), interventions by the shogun over the ensuing years inadvertently led to economic collapse. Tokugawa Yoshimune made so many attempts at reforms and controls that he came to be known as Kome Kubō or Kome Shōgun (the Rice Shogun). At the same time, attempts were made at monetary policy, which largely resulted in solving the problems of the rice economy, while bringing debasement of the currency.

The shogunate re-established the Rice Exchange in 1773, under governmental sponsorship, regulation, and organization; the shogunate also established its own rice storehouse at this time. The direct impetus for this was a series of riots, as a result of famines, earlier that year. In general, however, by this point, the government realized the extreme economic power of the Rice Exchange in supporting the entire national economy, determining exchange rates, and even creating paper money. An incredible proportion of the nation's monetary transactions were handled through the private, independent, merchants of Dōjima, who stored rice for most of the daimyō, exchanging it for paper money. Dōjima held what were in essence "bank accounts" for a great number of samurai and daimyō, managing deposits, withdrawals, loans, and tax payments. Though the shogunate ultimately had little sense of modern economic theory, and thus would make some serious errors in their monetary and financial policy over the course of the following century or so, they nevertheless recognized the need for governmental control of such policies; exchange rates, monetary standards and the like had to be set by the government, and not left in the hands of an increasingly wealthy and powerful merchant class which was intended to be at the bottom of the neo-Confucian mibunsei class system.

Reorganized in the Meiji period along with nearly every other element of the economy and polity, the Dōjima Rice Exchange was formally dissolved in 1939, when its function was overtaken and replaced by the Government Rice Agency.

== See also ==
- Komekitte - Edo period rice vouchers that were used as currency.
- Kura (storehouse) - Place where rice was stored.

== Bibliography ==
- Frederic, Louis. (2002). "Japan Encyclopedia." Cambridge, MA: Harvard University Press.
- Kaplan, Edward. The Cultures of East Asia: Political-Material Aspects. Chap. 16. 09 Nov 2006.
- Poitras, Geoffrey (2000). The Early History of Financial Economics, 1478–1776: From Commercial Arithmetic to Life Annuities and Joint Stocks. Aldershot, UK: Edward Elgar.
- Sansom, George Bailey. (1963). A History of Japan: 1615–1867. Stanford: Stanford University Press.
- Schaede, Ulrike (1989). "Forwards and Futures in Tokugawa-period Japan: A New Perspective on the Dojima Rice Market" in Journal of Banking and Finance, 13, pp. 487–513.
- West, Mark D. (2000). "Private Ordering at the World's First Futures Exchange"
