= Ginza (agency) =

Ginza (銀座) was the Tokugawa shogunate's officially sanctioned silver monopoly or silver guild (za) which was created in 1598.

Initially, the Tokugawa shogunate was interested in assuring a consistent value in minted silver coins; and this led to the perceived need for attending to the supply of silver.

This bakufu title identifies a regulatory agency with responsibility for supervising the minting of silver coins and for superintending all silver mines, silver mining and silver-extraction activities in Japan.

== See also ==
- Bugyō
- Kinzan-bugyō
- Kinza – Gold za (monopoly office or guild).
- Dōza – Copper za (monopoly office or guild).
- Shuza – Cinnabar za (monopoly office or guild)
