= Aikawa, Niigata =

Aikawa 相川町
- Former municipality
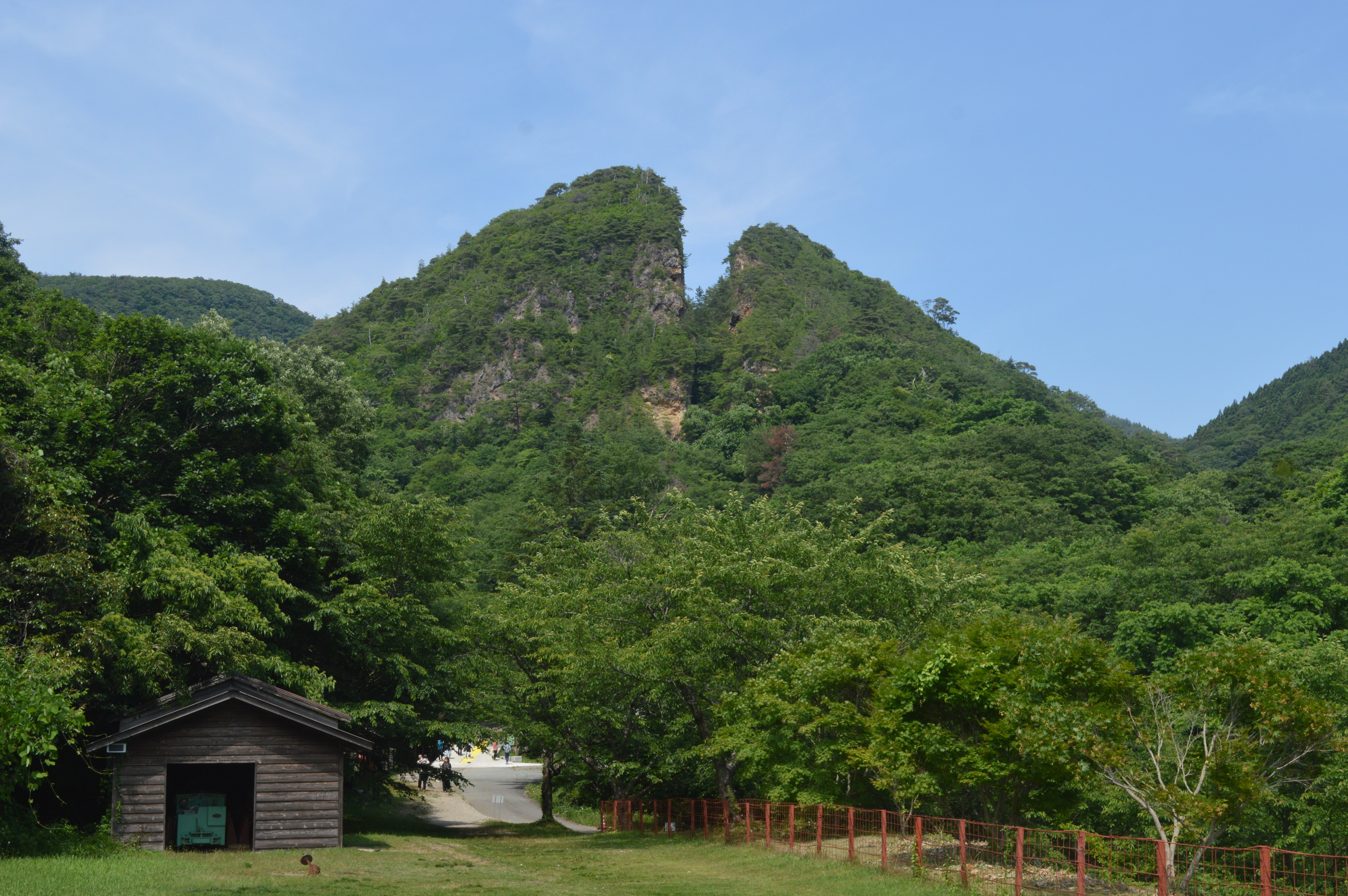
- Aikawa Gold and Silver Mine (Sado mine)

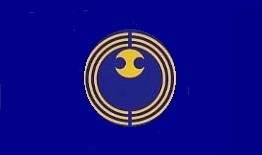
- Flag Seal

- Former location in Niigata Prefecture Former location in Japan
- Country: Japan
- Region: Hokuriku
- Prefecture: Niigata Prefecture
- District: Sado District
- Merged: March 1, 2004 (now part of Sado)

Area
  - Total: 192.3 km^{2} (74.2 sq mi)

Population (2000)
  - Total: 9,669
- Time zone: UTC+09:00 (JST)

10 subdivisions (former municipalities) in the Sado City. Aikawa is located on the northwest of the island.

Aikawa (相川町, Aikawa-machi) was a town located in Sado Island, Niigata Prefecture, Japan.

On March 1, 2004, Aikawa and the other 9 municipalities in the island were merged to create the city of Sado. Since then, Aikawa has been one of the 10 subdivisions of Sado City.

== Transportation ==
=== Bus ===
- Niigata Kotsu Sado

== Local attractions ==
- Aikawa Gold and Silver Mine (Sado mine)
  - Kitazawa Flotation Plant (ja:北沢浮遊選鉱場)
  - Aikawa Folk Museum
- Sado bugyōsho
- Senkakuwan Bay (ja:尖閣湾)
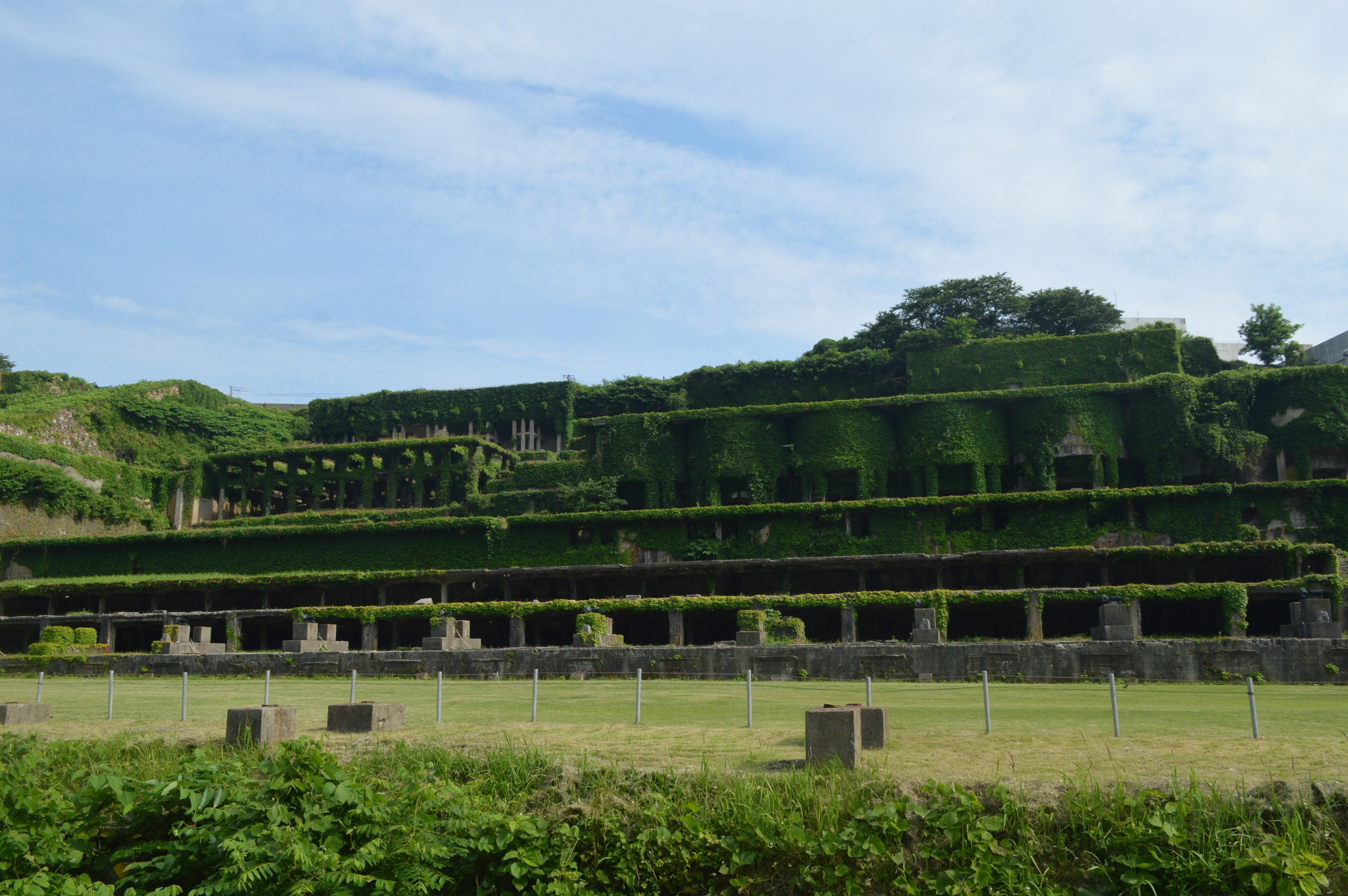
Kitazawa Flotation Plant)

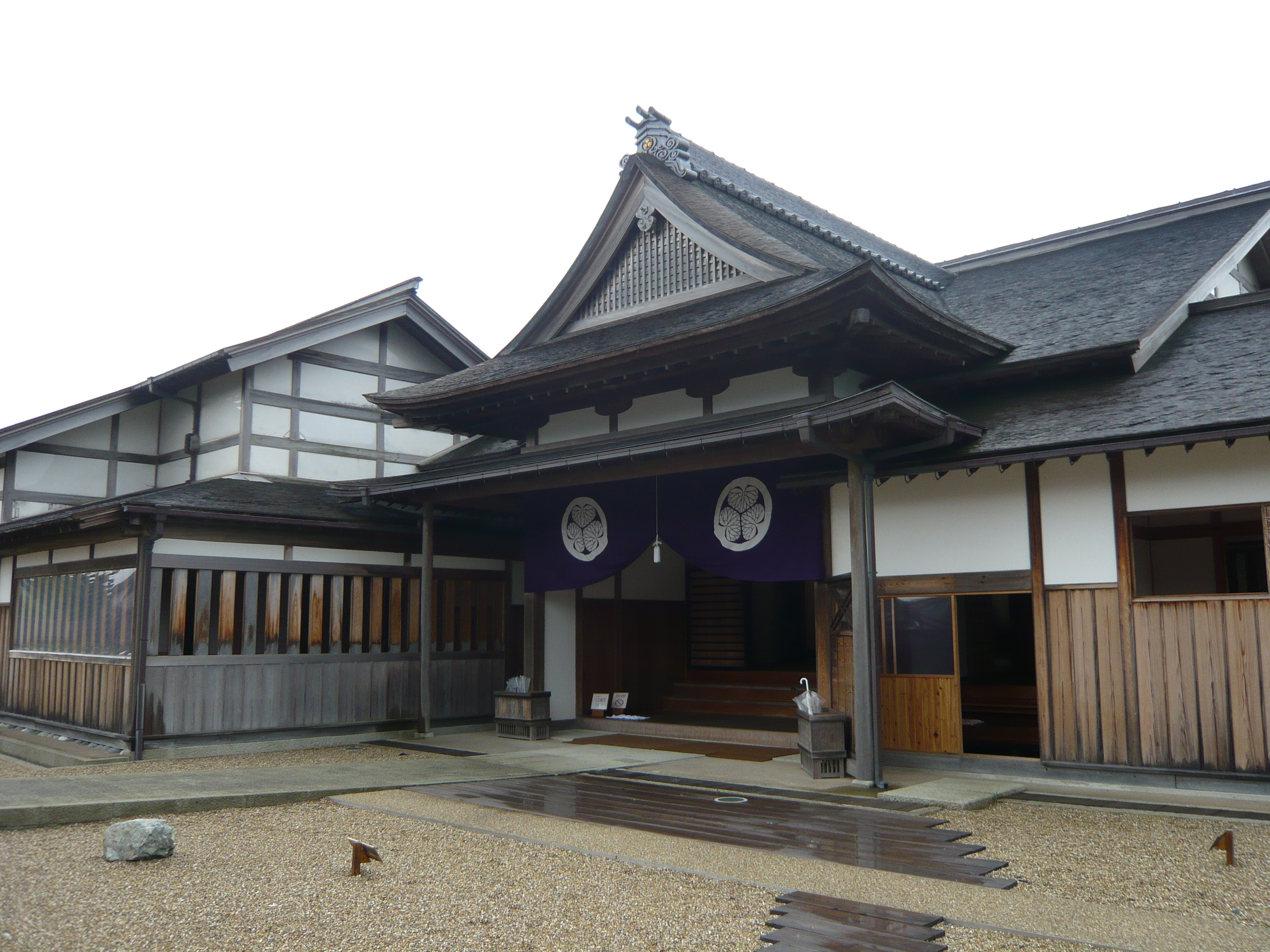
Reconstruction of the Sado bugyōsho

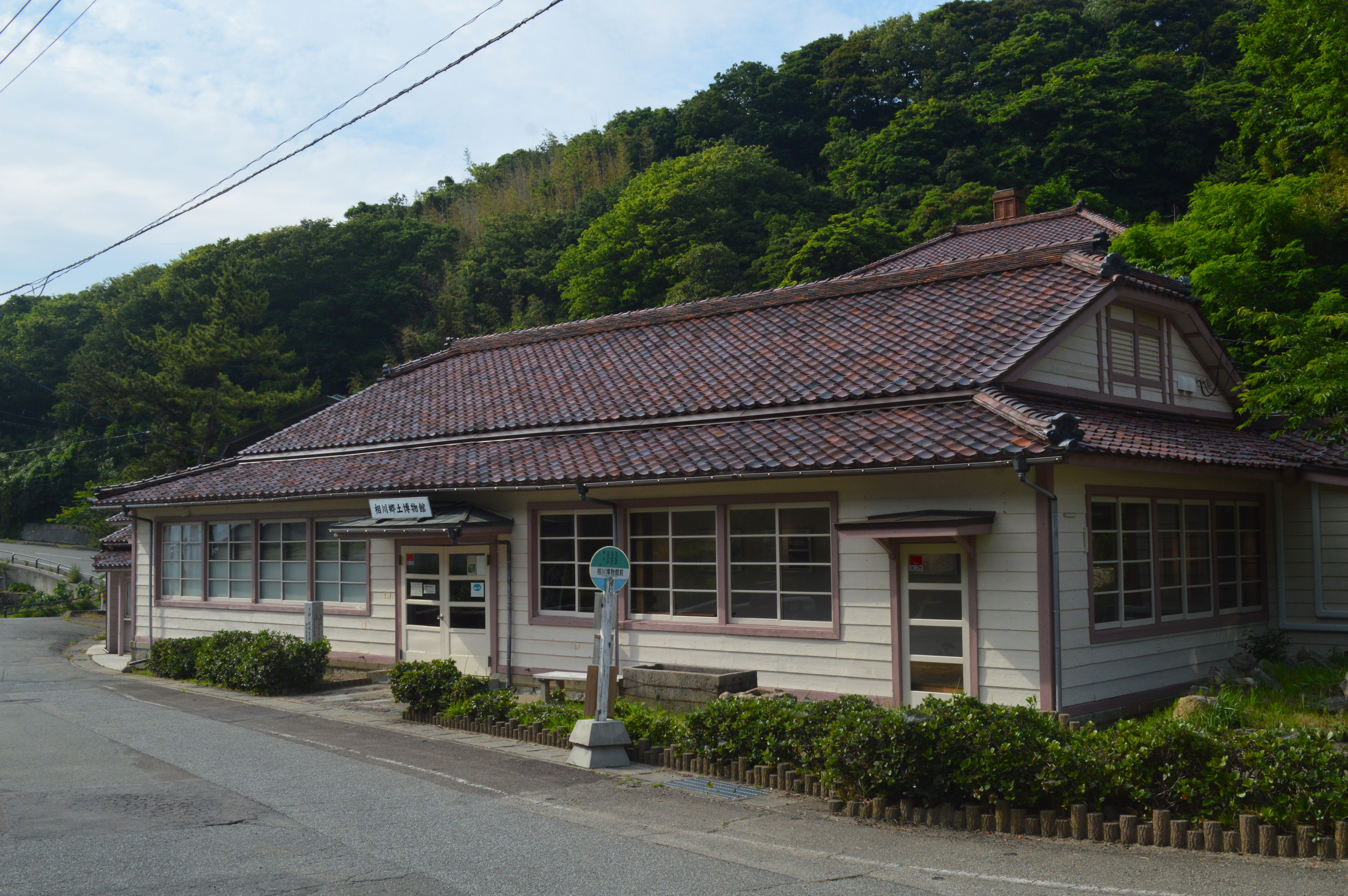
Aikawa Folk Museum

== See also ==
- Sado, Niigata
- Sado mine
- Sado bugyō
