= Sado mine =

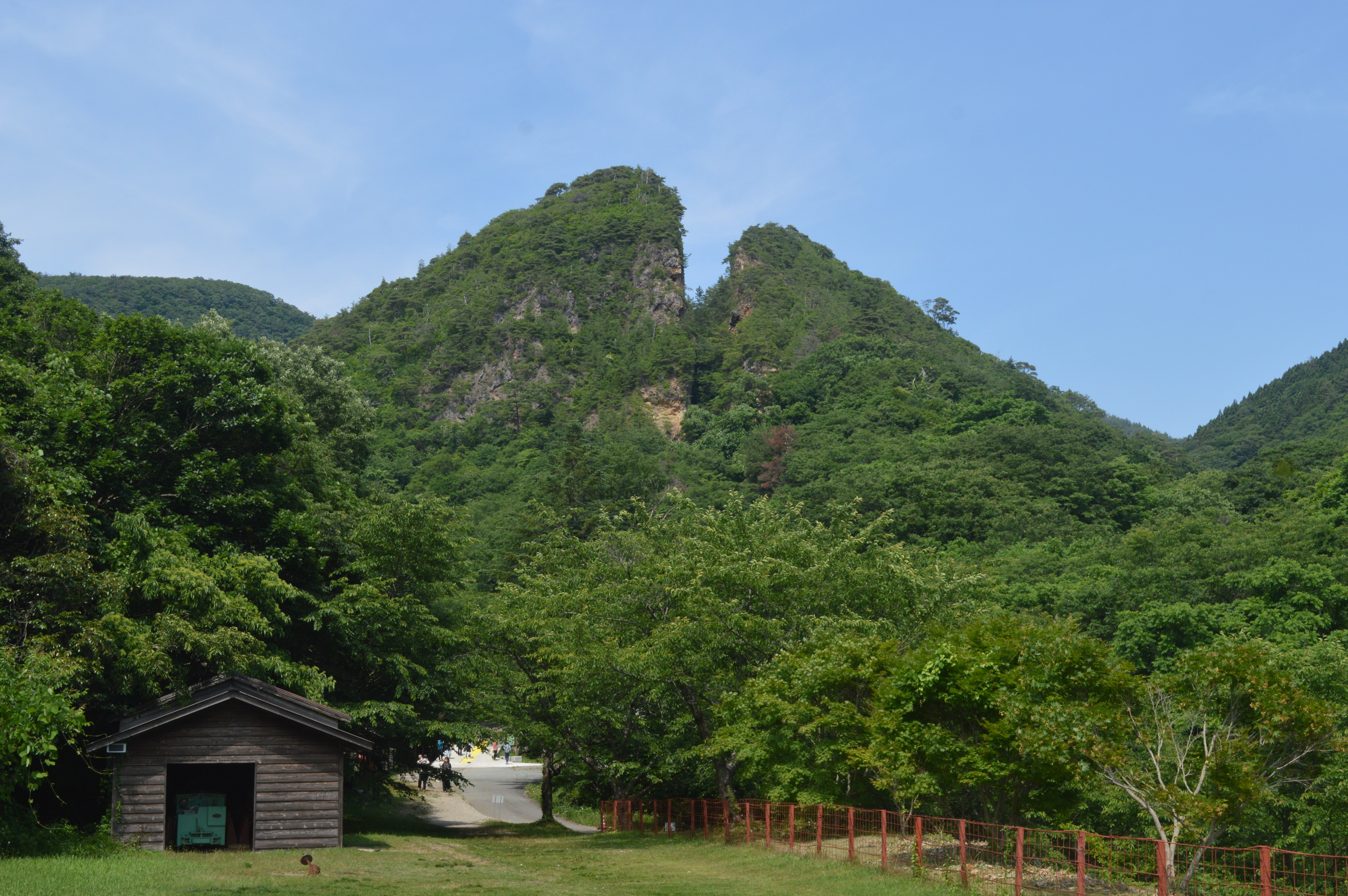
- Sado Mine (Aikawa Gold and Silver Mine)

- Location within Niigata Prefecture Location within Japan
- Interactive map of Sado mine
- Location: Niigata Prefecture, Japan; 38°2′29.83″N 138°15′21.17″E
- Products: Silver, gold
- Closed: 1989
- National Historic Site of Japan

UNESCO World Heritage Site
- Part of: Sado Island Gold Mines
- Criteria: Cultural: iv
- Reference: 1698
- Inscription: 2024 (46th Session)

Ruins of Kitazawa Flotation Plant in Aikawa

The Sado gold mine (佐渡金山, Sado Kinzan) is a generic term for gold and silver mines which were once located on the island of Sado in Niigata Prefecture, Japan. Among these mines, the Aikawa Gold and Silver Mine (相川金銀山, Aikawa kinginzan) was the largest and was in operation until the modern era.

According to Korean sources copper was extracted during WWII using from 1,000 to 2,000 forced Korean laborers, drafted under Japanese colonial rule of Korea. In 2015 Japan's Ambassador to UNESCO Kuni Sato acknowledged the forced labor history.

The Sado Gold and Silver Mine was inscribed on Japan's World Heritage Tentative List under the title "The Sado Complex of Heritage Mines, Primarily Gold Mines" in 2010. In 2024 they were listed as UNESCO World Heritage Sites. As part of this process, Japan installed an exhibit acknowledging poor work conditions, but critics allege there are no mentions of forced labor in the exhibit.

== History ==
=== Heian Period (794–1185) ===
The origins of mining on Sado are unknown; however, surface deposits of native gold and argentite in quartz substrate have been known since at least the Heian period. In the Heian period Konjaku Monogatarishū (Tales of Ancient and Modern Japan), there is an anecdote about a trip to Sado Province to mine for gold sand.

A chief iron sand miner in Noto Province said that there was no other place where gold could be extracted as well as on Sado Island. The governor of Noto heard this story and asked him if it was true. The chief demanded a small boat and some food, and crossed over to Sado. A month or so later, when the governor had almost forgotten about the story, the chief returned from Sado. When the governor met him, the chief presented him with gold sand wrapped in a piece of cloth. After that, the chief suddenly disappeared, and the governor asked around for him, but finally could not locate him. The people suspected that the chief had disappeared, perhaps thinking that he would be questioned about the whereabouts of the gold sand. It is said that the gold sand brought by the chief was worth as much as 1,000 ryō.

It seems that gold was known to be produced on Sado Island, at least in the form of gold sand, etc., by the late 11th century, when the Konjaku Monogatarishū is estimated to have been written. A similar anecdote is also found in the Uji Shūi Monogatari (Gleanings from Uji Dainagon Monogatari) written in the first half of the 13th century.

=== Sengoku Period (1467–1615) ===
During the Sengoku period, new local lords, such as the Sawane Honma clan and the Katagami Honma clan, rose to prominence in Sado, leading to frequent conflicts across the island. This upheaval was driven by the discovery of the Tsurushi Silver Mine in 1542 and the redevelopment of the Nishimikawa Gold Mine in 1593, both of which were controlled by these emerging powers. Toward the end of the Sengoku period, the island was divided by the ongoing struggle between the Kawarada Honma clan and the Hamochi Honma clan. However, Sado was pacified in 1589 by Uesugi Kagekatsu's military campaign and remained under Uesugi control until 1600. During this time, large-scale development of the gold and silver mines progressed, incorporating the latest techniques such as tunnel digging, introduced from Iwami Province, which later enabled the production of gold and silver at the Aikawa mines.

=== Edo Period (1603–1867) ===
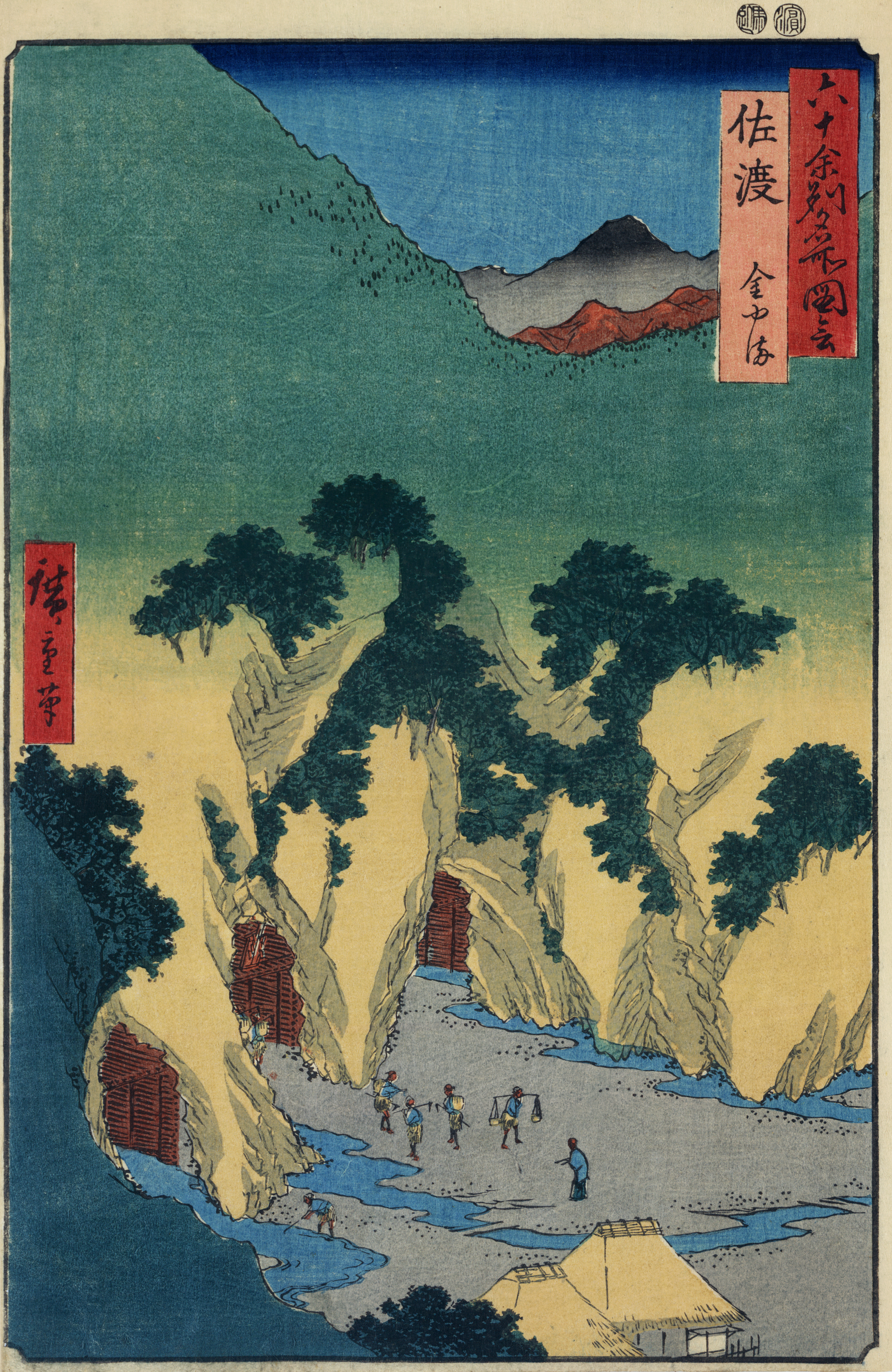
Hiroshige Utagawa, "Sado Gold Mine," 1853.

In 1601, Sado became the territory of Tokugawa Ieyasu. That same year, a gold vein was discovered in Kinpokusan, and throughout the Edo period, the mine became a crucial source of revenue for the Tokugawa shogunate, especially during the first half of the 17th century.

The peak of production during the Edo period was from the Genna to Kan'ei eras in the early Edo period, when it is estimated that more than 400 kg of gold was produced annually. Records indicate that 10,000 kan (37.5 tons) of silver was delivered to the shogunate each year. At the time, it was one of the largest gold mines in the world and one of Japan's leading silver producers, providing essential materials for the Keichō gold and silver coins minted by the Tokugawa shogunate. The Aikawa Mine was the core of the Sado Mines, directly managed by the shogunate, producing large quantities of gold and silver. The refined gold and ash-blown silver (灰吹銀, haifuki-gin) were paid to the shogunate, which were then managed by the Gold Mint (Kinza)and Silver Mint (Ginza) to be cast into currency. Additionally, large amounts of silver, particularly ash-blown silver from Sado, were exported to China and other countries in exchange for raw silk and other goods, earning the name "Seda silver."

However, by the later half of the Edo period, extraction was becoming increasingly difficult due to water ingression from natural springs and into the tunnels following veins of ore underneath the seabed. The shogunate supplemented the local workforce by bringing in convicted criminals and indigents from the streets of Edo. Conditions for these forced laborers was extremely harsh, as they were used for the most dangerous tasks and for the heavy labor involved in draining the mines, and a sentence to the Sado mines was a life sentence.

=== Modern history ===
From the early Meiji era, the Sado Mine became government-operated (initially under the Ministry of Public Works, then the Ministry of Agriculture and Commerce, the Ministry of Finance, and from 1889, the Imperial Household Agency's Imperial Property Bureau). To address the decline in production since the mid-Edo period, the Meiji government sent Western engineers to the mine in 1869 and began introducing modern Western technologies such as gunpowder mining, rock drills, and pumping machines. As a result, production began to increase again.

In 1877, a modern ore processing plant and Japan's first Western-style vertical shafts, including the Ōdate vertical shaft, were completed using Western techniques.

In 1885, the government aimed to further increase production to transition to a modern monetary system based on the gold standard. This involved the excavation of the Takatō (高任) shaft, the construction of the Kitazawa flotation plant (北沢浮遊選鉱場) using new German technology, and the improvement of Ōma Port. Additionally, to advance the domestic development of mining technology, a mining school was established in 1890, marking a significant milestone in Japanese mining education.

In 1896, the Sado Mine, which was a part of the imperial household's assets, was sold to Mitsubishi Goshi Kaisha (renamed Mitsubishi Mining Co., Ltd. in 1918, now Mitsubishi Materials) along with other mines such as the Ikuno Mine in Hyōgo Prefecture. Mitsubishi advanced the mechanization of the Sado Mine, including the electrification of power. As a result, by the late Meiji era, the annual gold production of the mine exceeded 400 kg, returning to the level of the early 17th century, which was the peak of production during the Edo period.

Production continued to increase thereafter, and particularly after the 1931 Mukden incident, which led to an expansion of warfare in China, the demand for gold as a means of settling payments for large quantities of military supplies grew. This led to an enhancement of gold production at the Sado Mine. By 1940, the mine achieved its highest historical production, producing approximately 1,500 kg of gold and about 25 tons of silver annually.

In February 1939, the Sado Mine first recruited workers on the Korean Peninsula to fill the shortage of Japanese laborers for the draft. At the time, the Korean Peninsula was part of Japan's territory. The recruiting area was mainly in South Chungcheong Province, and the recruitment was so popular that for every 20 people recruited per village, there were 40 applicants. It is believed that the drought in South Korea in 1938 was one of the reasons for the high number of applicants. However, most of them only applied because they longed for life on the Japanese mainland, and many of them fled as soon as they arrived in Shimonoseki or Osaka. Between February 1939 and the last recruitment in March 1945, a total of 1,200 Korean workers came to the Sado Mine (not including their accompanying families).

However, the actual number of Korean workers working at the Sado Mine was only about half of that number: as of the end of May 1943, the number of Korean workers who came to the Sado Mine was 1005, of which 10 died, 148 escaped, 6 were repatriated for public injuries, 30 for personal illness, 25 for bad conduct, 72 were furloughed, and 130 transferred out. The actual number of Korean workers was 584.

The average number of working days for a Korean worker at that time was about 28 days, and the average monthly income was 66.77 yen. There was also an incentive for full-time work. In the event of death, the company paid up to 300 yen. In addition, a school was set up by the company to provide Japanese language education for those who wanted to improve their Japanese.

However, since food, bedding, and work clothes were not free, Korean workers sometimes went on strike demanding better treatment, and the Sado Mining Works had a hard time improving their conditions.

In 1945, the Sado Mine did not perform well in copper mining and there was an excess of Korean workers. Therefore, in August of the same year, the Sado Mine dispatched 189 workers to Saitama Prefecture as the first group of volunteer workers and 219 workers to Fukushima Prefecture as the second group of volunteer workers, for a total of 408 workers.

On August 15, 1945, the Pacific War ended with Japan's defeat. As of August 15, 244 Koreans were working at the Sado Mine. Immediately after the defeat, Koreans who had been sent to the Sado Mine from Sado as the first and second "special volunteer corps" returned to the mine. The Fukushima group arrived on August 26, and the Saitama group on August 27 and 28, for a total of 319 workers. The original number of 408 Koreans dispatched was 408, but during this period, 89 Koreans were reported missing. These were those who escaped while in Saitama or Fukushima, or refused to return to Sado Island after August 15.

In addition, due to the defeat in the war, there was a succession of those who fled Sado and those who returned to the mines, and by the end of August, the number of Koreans at the Sado Mine reached 573. Seven new Koreans fled from the Sado Mine between August 15 and September 11, while 27 returned to the mines.

Mining operations had been reduced by a large scale by 1952. The final mining operations were stopped on March 31, 1989.

Overview
Name	Opening	Closing	location
Nishimikawa placer gold mine (西三川砂金山)	Heian period	1872	37°53′54″N 138°17′47″E
Tsurushi silver mine (鶴子銀山)	Sengoku period	1946	38°01′10″N 138°15′53″E
Niibo silver mine (新穂銀山)	Sengoku period	unknown	37°59′16″N 138°27′00″E
Aikawa gold and silver mine (相川金銀山)	Edo period	1989	38°02′30″N 138°15′22″E

== Current situation ==
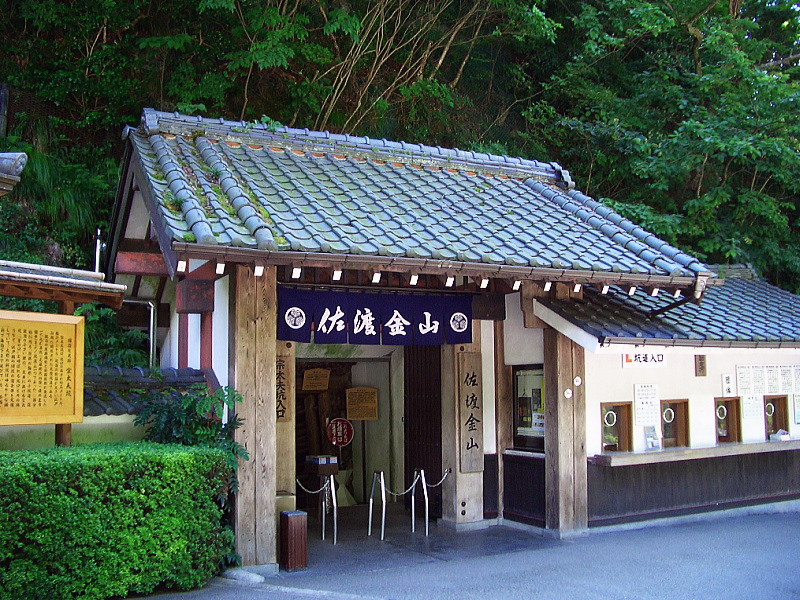
Entrance of tour course and museum

Since the closure of the mine, efforts have been made to turn some of the sites, particularly the Aikawa mine into tourist attraction and to preserve some of the buildings and facilities as part of Japan's industrial heritage. Of the estimated 400 kilometres (250 mi) of tunnels in the Aikawa Mine, about 300 metres (0.19 mi) have been opened to the public as a museum, with mannequins and explanatory dioramas to explain the history of the facility.

The Sado gold mine was designated a National Historic Site of Japan in 1994, with the area under protection expanded in 2017. In 2024, it was recognised as a World Heritage Site by UNESCO, with Japan agreeing to provide a "full explanation" of its history to overcome official protests from South Korea. Other sources noted that the compromise among the Japanese administration of Fumio Kishida and the South Korean Yoon Suk Yeol administration removed any direct reference to the usage of forced Korean labor, effectively distorting the history of the site for political gain.

On 24 November 2024 Japanese officials held a memorial ceremony at the Sado Island Gold Mines. They honoured workers who died on site, including Koreans, without acknowledging the forced labor. South Korean officials boycotted the memorial service.

== See also ==
- List of Historic Sites of Japan (Niigata)
- Aikawa, Niigata
- Hashima Island
