= Komekitte =

Edo-period apanese certificate of rice storage

Komekitte (米切手) aka: kuramaikitte (蔵米切手) refer to certificates of rice storage that were issued by clans in Japan during the Edo period.

== Background ==
During the Kanbun era (1661–1673) the only financial facilities open to various daimyo was a system known as Kakeya (かけや). This name derived from making a deposit of money known as Kakeku with certain financial houses. As almost all of the prominent merchants tried to act as kakeya to the daimyo, this system greatly benefited the ruling shogunate. The main function of a Kakeya was to act as an agent in the sale of his patron's rice and other products of the daimyo's fiefs. A method of sale was adopted by the Kakeya where rice was sent to storehouses (usually in Osaka), where bids were called by posting notices with a fixed date on the storehouse gates. When the Kakeya opened the tenders at the stores on the given date they posted the result of their decisions with the names of the successful bidders. The winning bidders upon seeing the notice then paid the kakeya earnest money (shiki-gin), their merchant's seal was affixed on the official books, and a receipt (gin-kittle) was given in return. Any given merchant was given up to ten days to hand in all of the remaining deposit money or else they defaulted and were barred from future bids.

== History ==
Komekitte date to at least 1654 when a market for them started to appear as merchants used them as cash. These were originally issued as coupons by storehouses as a way to promote trading, and entitled the bearer to their rice stores with a deposit of one-third of the desired value. The balance was then paid upon delivery of the rice which was to be within 30 days. Each Komekitte bore the name of the given storehouse and were issued in denominations of 10 Koku (1 koku equaled about 100 liters or 5 bushels), although these coupons expired quickly they were widely circulated. Any claims over rice represented in Komekitte were protected by the shogunate and enforced by law as it helped to reduce the transaction costs of trading large amounts of rice.

From 1812 to 1842, the daimyo of Sendai established a system of selling komekitte through an office in his "storehouse-compound". Other daimyo at the time from Higo, Chikuzen, Aki, and Kaga also had similar plans in place. This practice ended in 1842 with the abolition of guilds, and no public authorization was given again during the Tokugawa regime.

== See also ==
- Dōjima Rice Exchange
- Tokugawa Yoshimune
- Kura (storehouse)
- Dajōkansatsu
