= Shuza =

Shuza (朱座) was the Tokugawa shogunate's officially sanctioned cinnabar monopoly or cinnabar guild (za) which was created in 1609.

Initially, the Tokugawa shogunate was interested in assuring a consistent value in minted coins; and this led to the perceived need for attending to the supply of cinnabar.

This bakufu title identifies a regulatory agency with responsibility for supervising the handling and trading of cinnabar and for superintending all cinnabar mining and cinnabar-extraction activities in Japan.

== See also ==
- Bugyō
- Kinzan-bugyō
- Kinza – Gold za (monopoly office or guild).
- Ginza – Silver za (monopoly office or guild).
- Dōza – Copper za (monopoly office or guild)
