= Sado bugyō =

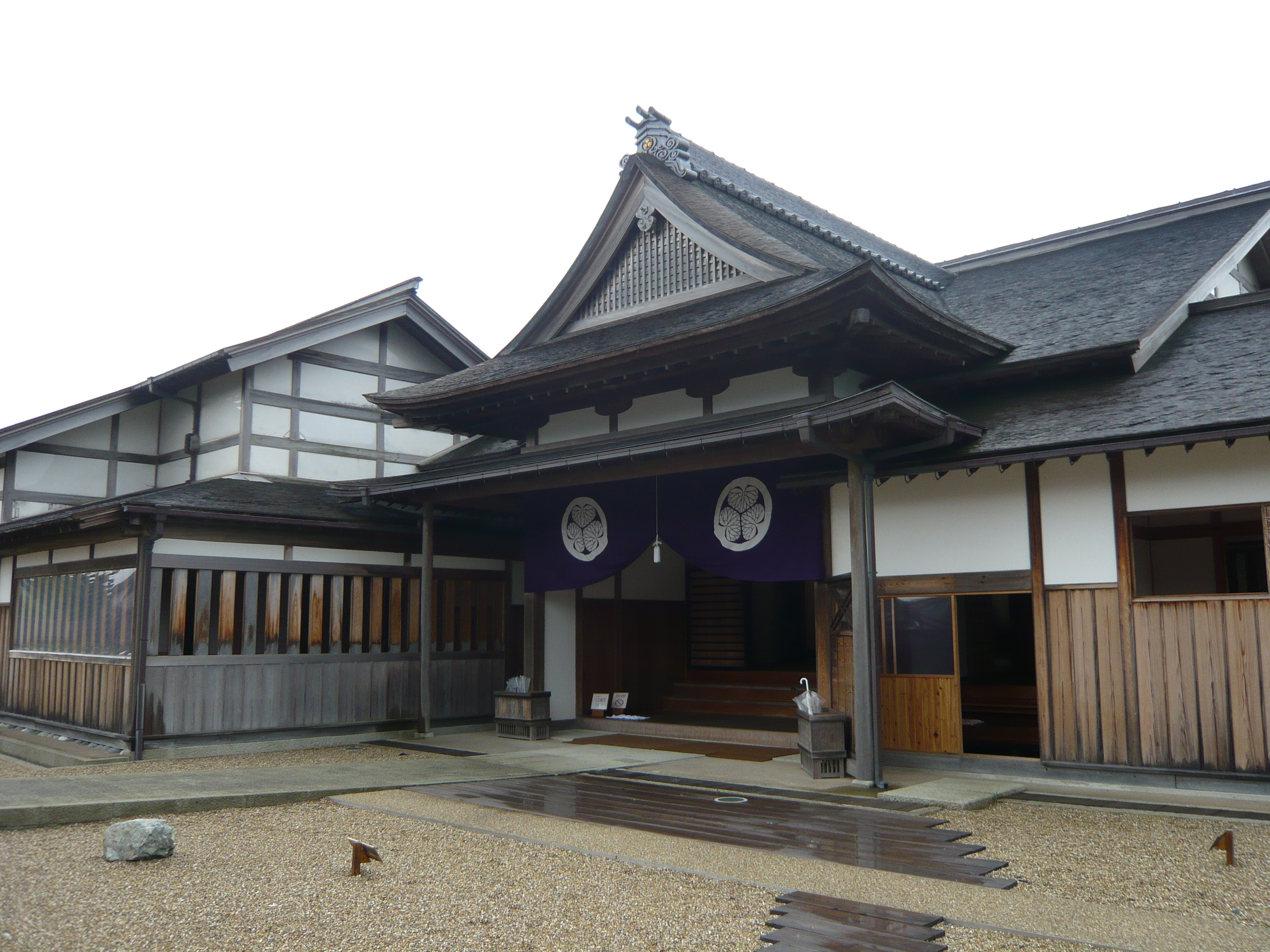
Reconstruction of the Sado bugyōsho

Sado bugyō (佐渡奉行) were officials of the Tokugawa shogunate responsible for administration of the mining operations at Sado.

Sado Island is the sixth largest in the Japanese archipelago. It is located in the Sea of Japan off the west coast of Echigo Province in northwest Honshu. For much of its pre-modern history, exiles were banished to the island. The island was noted for its deposits of gold and silver since at least the 12th century; however, intensive mining operations did not begin until the opening of the Aikawa Mine in 1601.

This same year, Sado was placed during the direct control of the Tokugawa shogunate, and in 1603 Ōkubo Nagayasu was appointed the first "commissioner". The title was officially Sado daikan until 1618, and bugyō afterwards. The post was occupied by hatamoto assisted by a staff of up to a hundred yoriki and dōshin constables.

The mines at Sado were worked vigorously; and were a major source of revenue for the early Tokugawa shogunate, producing approximately 100 tons of gold and silver from 1616 to 1627; however, by the 1730s the deposits were largely exhausted and production was less than a ton of silver until the mid-18th century. The post of Sado bugyō was abolished with the Meiji restoration.

== List of Sado bugyō ==
- 1603-1613 Ōkubo Nagayasu

== See also ==
- Bugyō
