= Ie (trading houses) =

Ie (家, lit. "house") were pre-modern Japanese trading houses and precursors to the modern zaibatsu and keiretsu. They first emerged in the mid-18th century, and shared many features with the Western concept of cottage industry. The ie operated on a system very similar to what economists today call the "Putting-Out system" or "workshop system." City-based merchants would provide rural producers with raw materials and equipment, and would then sell the final product in the cities.

This level of organization to production, with one trading house (in effect, one company) controlling production, transportation, and sales, was unprecedented in Japan, and can easily been seen as the forerunner to the factory system, economic and industrial modernization, and the rise of the zaibatsu (Japanese monopolies). One of the key differences, organizationally, however, between the ie and the zaibatsu which would come later is that the ie always focused on producing and selling only one or two types of goods; so-called "horizontal zaibatsu" would seek to deal in many unrelated types of goods. For example, today, Mitsubishi is both an automobile company and a bank.

Two of the ie, founded by merchants in the early 17th century, survive today as Mitsui and Sumitomo, both major modern Japanese corporations.

== History ==
In the late 18th and 19th centuries, as Japan's economy continued to develop and modernize in many ways, the ie adapted, changing and growing to meet the demands of the new economic situation. Many became banks, trading originally in rice (which was essentially currency; see koku) and later in paper and metal currency. In doing so, they began to replace the Osaka rice brokers; by 1868, the Osaka rice brokers, in many ways the first bankers in Japan, had disappeared. The next step in the development of the ie would come with the opening of Japan to foreign trade in the 1850s-60s. Many ie reorganized and came to be known as sōgō shōsha (総合商社), trading companies which focused on exchanging domestic goods for foreign goods, which they would then resell in Japan's major cities. By the beginning of the 20th century, the ie had disappeared. However, many were not eliminated, but rather transformed into modern sōgō shōsha, zaibatsu, and banks.
