= Dōza =

Dōza (銅座) was the Tokugawa shogunate's officially sanctioned copper monopoly or copper guild (za) which was created in 1636 and (1701–1712, 1738–1746, 1766–1768).

Initially, the Tokugawa shogunate was interested in assuring a consistent value in minted copper coins; and this led to the perceived need for attending to the supply of copper.

This bakufu title identifies a regulatory agency with responsibility for supervising the minting of copper coins and for superintending all copper mines, copper mining and copper-extraction activities in Japan.

== See also ==
- Bugyō
- Kinzan-bugyō
- Kinza – Gold za (monopoly office or guild).
- Ginza – Silver za (monopoly office or guild).
- Shuza – Cinnabar za (monopoly office or guild)
