= Sado Island =

Island off the coast of Niigata, Japan

Native name: 佐渡島
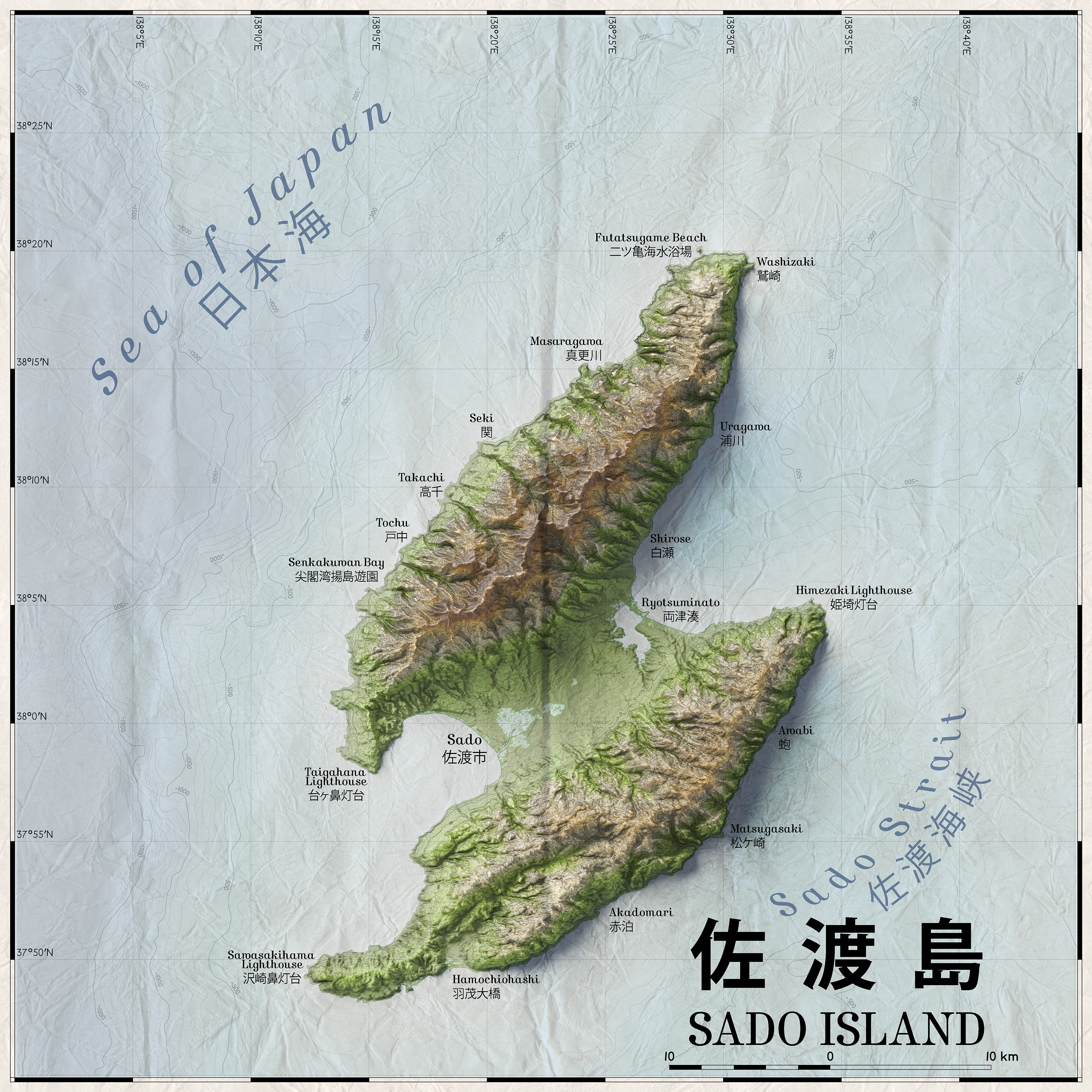
- Topographic map of Sado Island
- Interactive map of Sado Island

Geography
- Location: Japanese archipelago
- Coordinates: 38°04′03″N 138°23′51″E
- Area: 854.76 km^{2} (330.02 sq mi)
- Highest elevation: 1,172 m (3845 ft)
- Highest point: Mount Kinpoku

Administration
- Sado, Niigata, Japan

Sado Island (佐渡島, Sado(ga)shima; Japanese pronunciation: [sä̀.dó̞.ɡä́.ɕì.mä̀, -ŋä́-]) is an island located in the eastern part of the Sea of Japan, under the jurisdiction of Sado City, Niigata Prefecture, Japan, with a coastline of 262.7 kilometres (163.2 mi). In October 2017, Sado Island had a population of 55,212 people. Sado Island covers an area of 854.76 km^{2} (330.02 sq mi), and is the sixth largest island in Japan, excluding the disputed Southern Kurils. The shortest distance between Sado Island and Honshu is 32 km (20 mi). The highest peak on Sado Island is Mount Kinpoku, with an elevation of 1,172 m (3,845 ft).

Sado Island was the site of forced labor during World War II, when around 1,500 Koreans were conscripted and forced to work in the mines on the island. The Japanese government, some Japanese scholars, and a minority of international scholars oppose this claim.

== Geography ==
The shape of Sado Island resembles the kanji character for ‘work’ (工) in Japanese or the letter ‘S’. The topography of the island can be roughly divided into three parts, the Ōsado range in the north, the Kosado range in the south, and the Kakakura plain with flat terrain in between. The Ōsado range area is higher in altitude, and the highest peak of Sado Island, Mount Kinpoku (1,172 m (3,845 ft) above sea level), is also located in this area. The coastline on the north side of Mount Sado is steep, and is a famous tourist spot, among which the Senkaku Bay is the most famous. The Kosado range has a relatively flatter terrain with Satsuma orange and tea trees growing there. Its highest peak is Mount Ōjiyama, with an elevation of 646 m (2,119 ft). The Nakakura Plain is a large plain in Japan's outlying islands and is also the agricultural area of Sado Island. On the west side of the Kuninaka Plain is Mano Bay, and on the east side is Ryōtsu Bay. The Kokufugawa River (also reads Konogawa River) flows through the Kuninaka Plain, with a total length of 19 km (12 mi), and flows into Mano Bay. Its watershed area accounts for 20% of Sado Island. Lake Kamo, the largest lake in Niigata Prefecture, is located at the eastern end of the Kuninaka Plain. Lake Kamo was originally a freshwater lake, and later turned into a lagoon after an opening built to the Sea of Japan. Oyster breeding flourishes in the lake. Part of Sado Island belongs to the Sado-Yahiko-Yoneyama Quasi-National Park.

=== Gallery ===
Sado Island
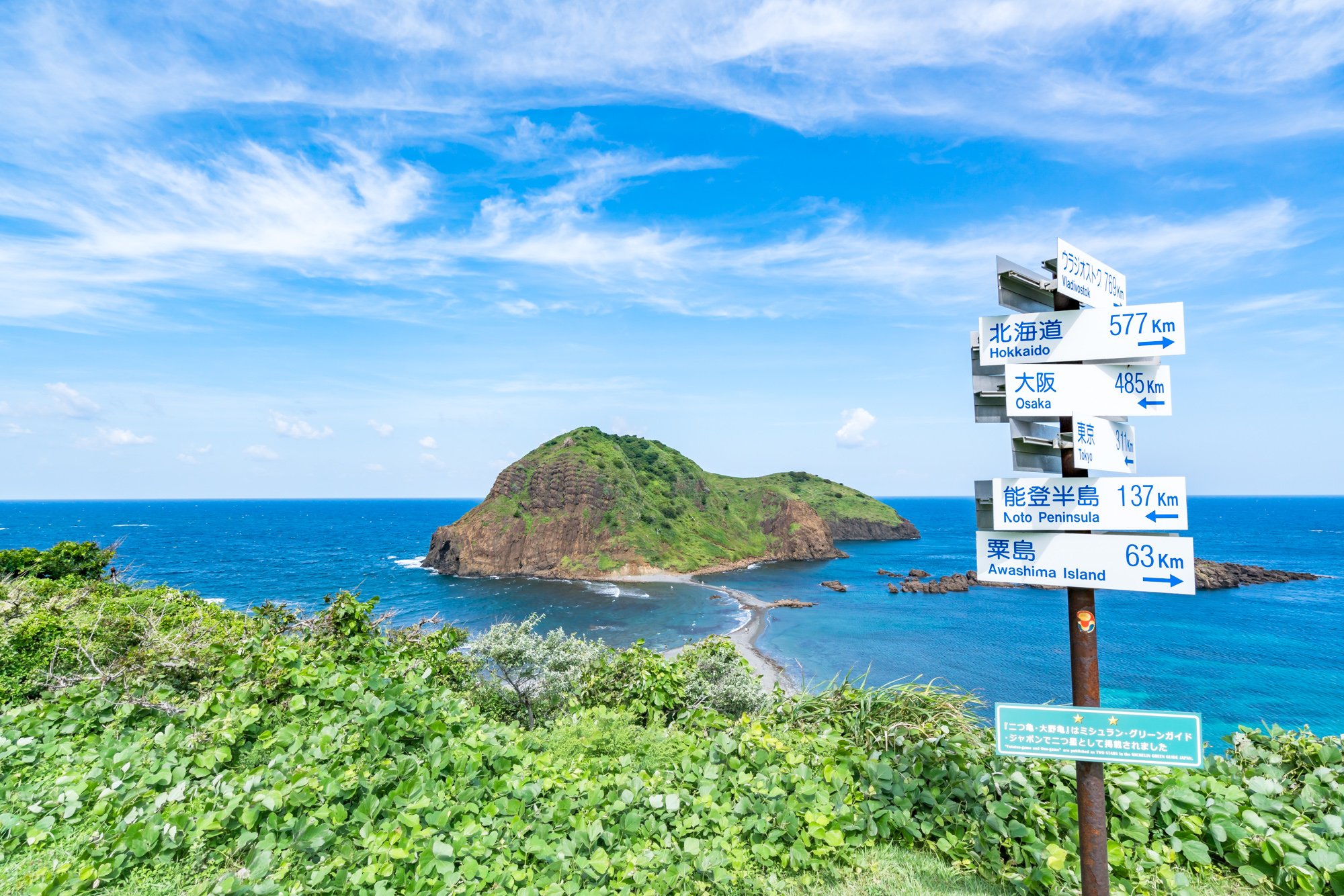
Futatsugame tombolo

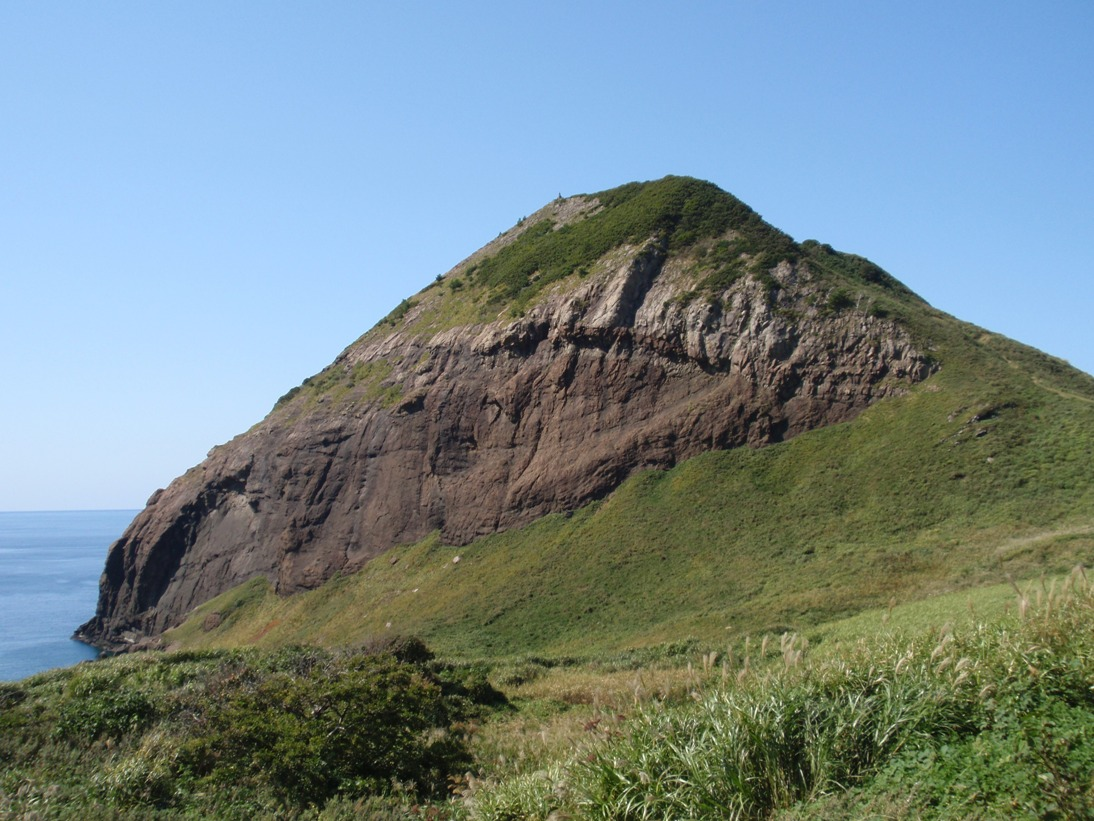
Onogame

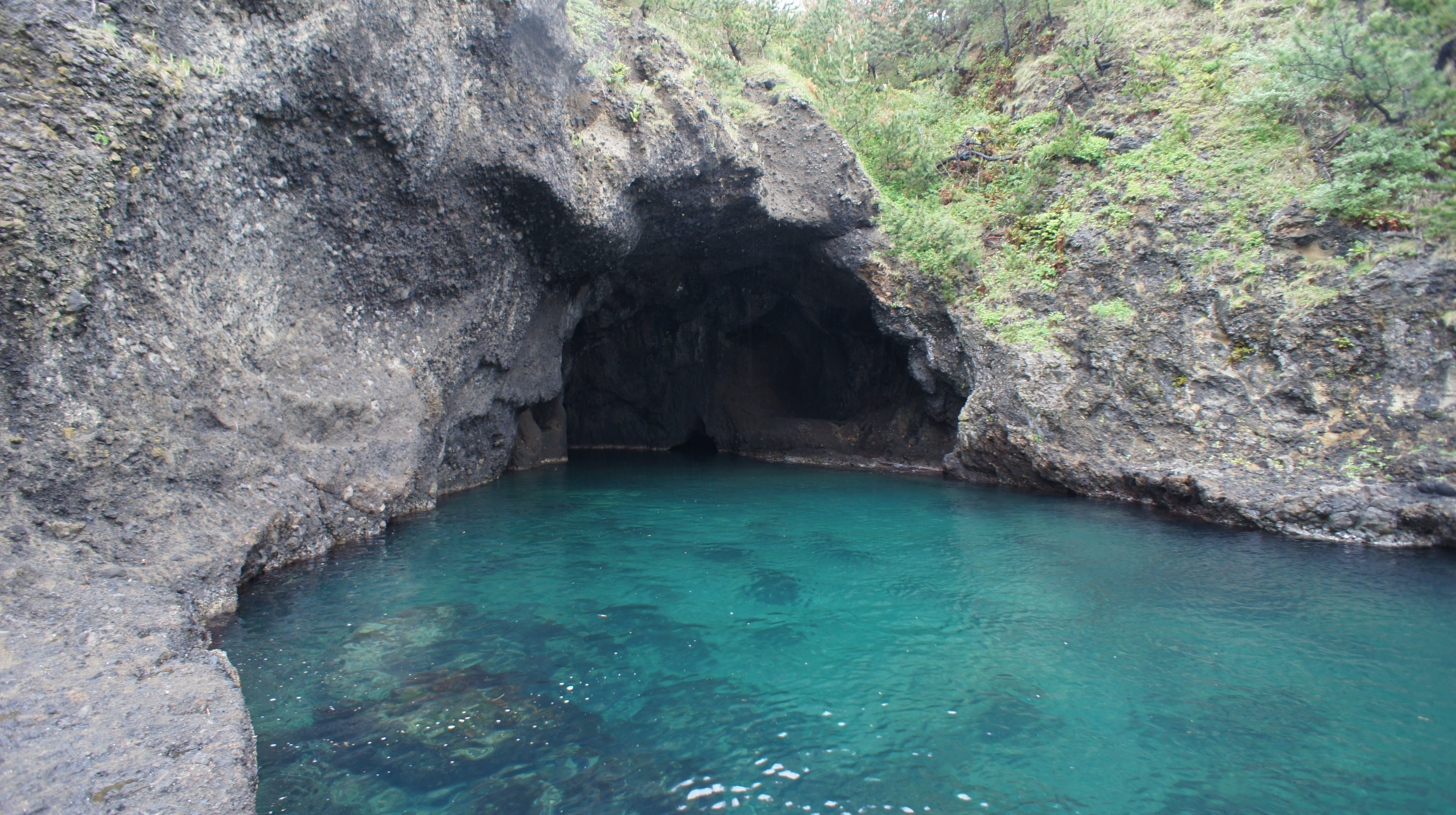
Kotoura Cave (Ryuodo Cave) in Ogi Coast

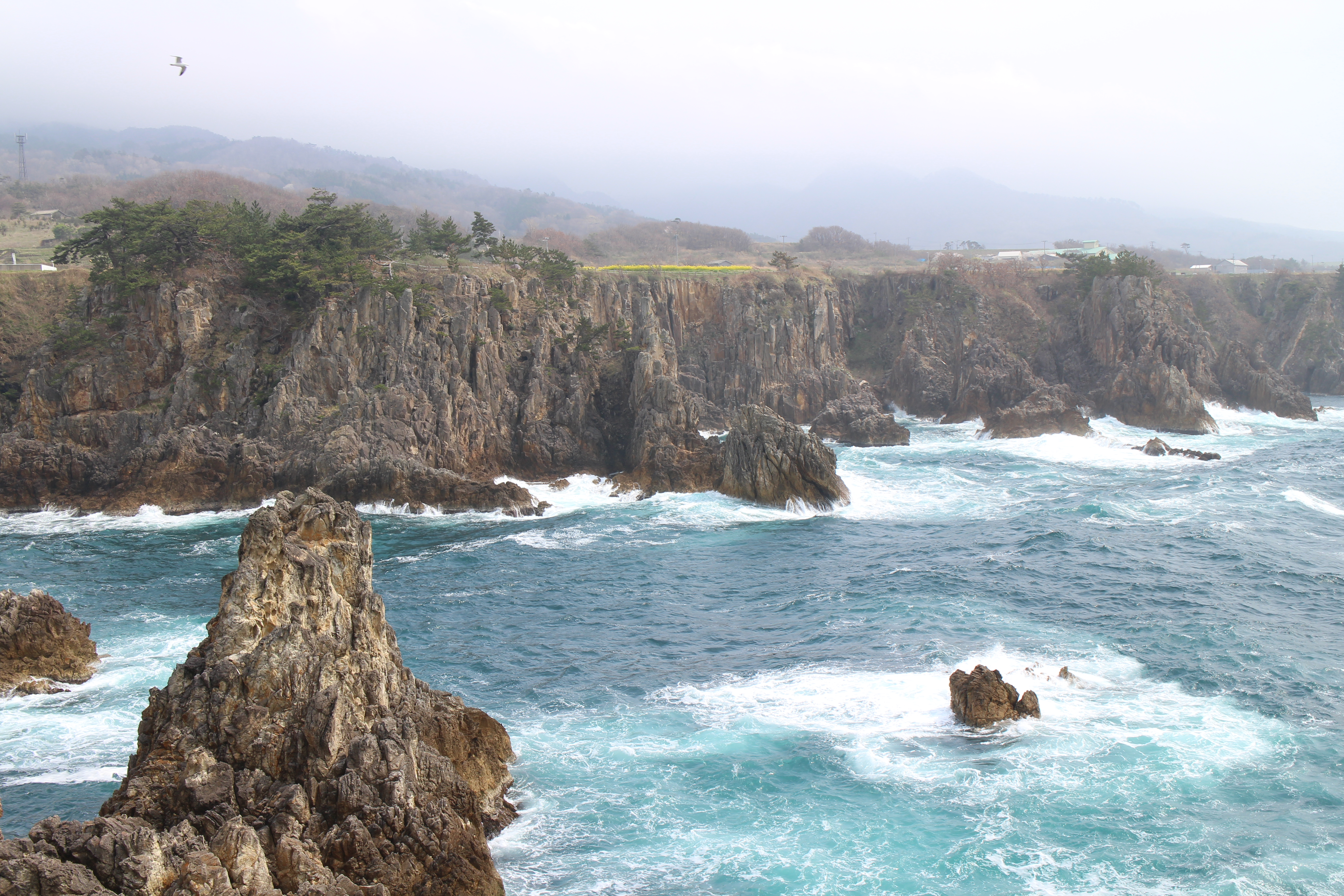
Senkaku Bay (Senkakuwan)

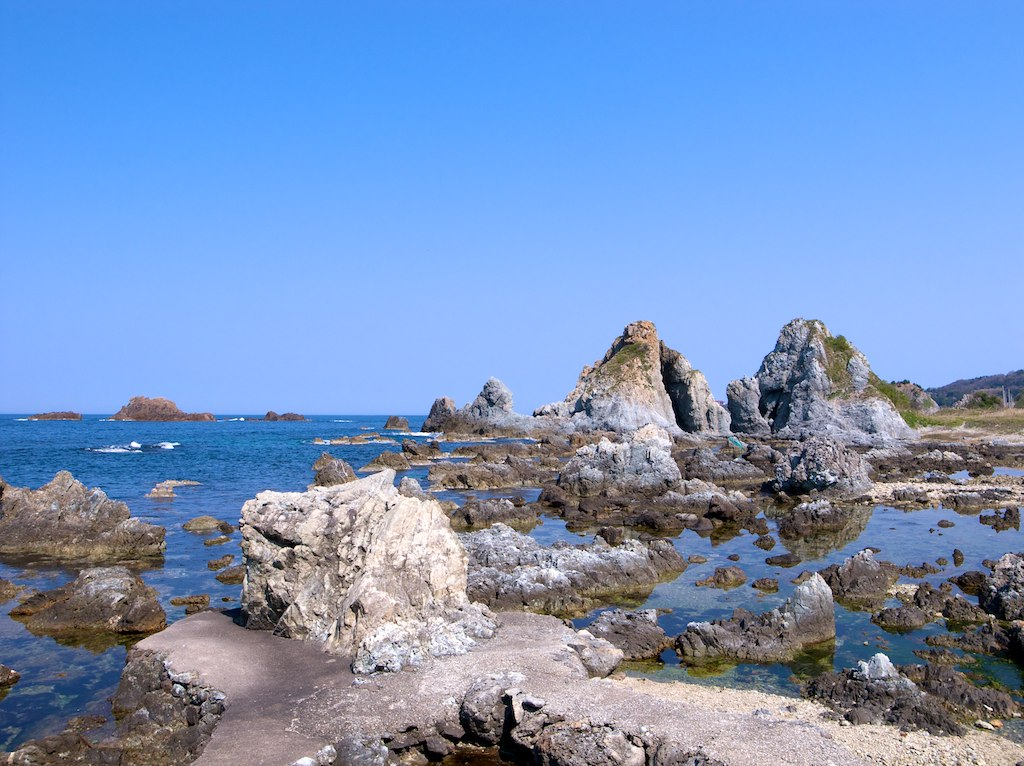
Nanaura Coast

=== Weather and climate ===
Influenced by the warm Tsushima Current that passes through the Sado waters, the winter in Sado Island is warmer than that in Niigata Prefecture and with less snow. In summer, due to the influence of ocean, the temperature difference between day and night is smaller than that of Niigata Prefecture, and is cooler than that of Niigata Prefecture. However, the Aikawa area on the northwestern side of the Ōsado range are affected by the monsoon blowing from the northwest and the temperature is higher. Precipitation on Sado Island is mainly concentrated in the end of the East Asian rainy season and early winter, and there is less precipitation than in Niigata Prefecture. When the low air pressure and typhoons pass through the Sea of Japan, Sado Island often suffers from Foehn wind, raising the temperature sharply. Located at the junction of the warm and cold current, Sado City enjoys diverse plants and rich aquatic resources.

Climate data for Aikawa, Sado, Niigata, 1991−2020 normals, extremes 1911−present
Month	Jan	Feb	Mar	Apr	May	Jun	Jul	Aug	Sep	Oct	Nov	Dec	Year
Record high °C (°F)	17.0 (62.6)	20.7 (69.3)	24.1 (75.4)	28.0 (82.4)	30.0 (86.0)	34.1 (93.4)	37.4 (99.3)	38.5 (101.3)	37.4 (99.3)	31.5 (88.7)	26.3 (79.3)	22.9 (73.2)	38.5 (101.3)
Mean maximum °C (°F)	12.4 (54.3)	13.7 (56.7)	17.6 (63.7)	23.3 (73.9)	26.8 (80.2)	28.6 (83.5)	32.8 (91.0)	34.2 (93.6)	31.8 (89.2)	26.1 (79.0)	21.0 (69.8)	15.7 (60.3)	35.0 (95.0)
Mean daily maximum °C (°F)	6.5 (43.7)	6.7 (44.1)	9.6 (49.3)	14.9 (58.8)	19.9 (67.8)	23.3 (73.9)	27.1 (80.8)	29.3 (84.7)	25.9 (78.6)	20.5 (68.9)	15.0 (59.0)	9.7 (49.5)	17.4 (63.3)
Daily mean °C (°F)	4.0 (39.2)	4.0 (39.2)	6.5 (43.7)	11.1 (52.0)	15.9 (60.6)	19.8 (67.6)	24.0 (75.2)	26.0 (78.8)	22.5 (72.5)	17.2 (63.0)	11.8 (53.2)	6.8 (44.2)	14.1 (57.4)
Mean daily minimum °C (°F)	1.3 (34.3)	1.0 (33.8)	2.9 (37.2)	7.2 (45.0)	12.0 (53.6)	16.6 (61.9)	21.3 (70.3)	22.9 (73.2)	19.2 (66.6)	13.6 (56.5)	8.2 (46.8)	3.8 (38.8)	10.8 (51.5)
Mean minimum °C (°F)	−2.3 (27.9)	−2.7 (27.1)	−1.3 (29.7)	1.9 (35.4)	6.4 (43.5)	11.9 (53.4)	17.1 (62.8)	18.7 (65.7)	14.3 (57.7)	8.3 (46.9)	3.0 (37.4)	−0.6 (30.9)	−3.1 (26.4)
Record low °C (°F)	−7.5 (18.5)	−7.4 (18.7)	−6.4 (20.5)	−2.1 (28.2)	2.5 (36.5)	7.6 (45.7)	12.1 (53.8)	14.6 (58.3)	9.5 (49.1)	4.4 (39.9)	−2.8 (27.0)	−6.6 (20.1)	−7.5 (18.5)
Average precipitation mm (inches)	131.1 (5.16)	91.6 (3.61)	96.6 (3.80)	94.5 (3.72)	97.3 (3.83)	122.5 (4.82)	207.3 (8.16)	137.5 (5.41)	139.9 (5.51)	133.1 (5.24)	154.8 (6.09)	175.7 (6.92)	1,581.9 (62.27)
Average snowfall cm (inches)	28 (11)	25 (9.8)	4 (1.6)	0 (0)	0 (0)	0 (0)	0 (0)	0 (0)	0 (0)	0 (0)	0 (0)	9 (3.5)	66 (25.9)
Average rainy days	19.7	15.3	14.0	10.3	9.7	9.0	10.9	8.7	10.4	12.3	16.6	20.9	157.8
Average snowy days	7.1	6.8	1.4	0	0	0	0	0	0	0	0	2.5	17.8
Average relative humidity (%)	69	68	66	67	72	78	81	77	73	69	68	69	71
Mean monthly sunshine hours	46.2	69.2	133.1	177.0	200.7	178.4	161.2	207.8	157.0	147.5	95.8	50.6	1,624.5
Source 1: JMA
Source 2: JMA

Climate data for Cape Hajikizaki (Note: Japanese: 弾崎), 38°19.8′N 138°30.7′E, 1991−2020 normals, extremes 1978−present
Month	Jan	Feb	Mar	Apr	May	Jun	Jul	Aug	Sep	Oct	Nov	Dec	Year
Record high °C (°F)	16.1 (61.0)	22.4 (72.3)	24.6 (76.3)	28.0 (82.4)	29.9 (85.8)	30.0 (86.0)	34.3 (93.7)	35.0 (95.0)	35.3 (95.5)	29.7 (85.5)	23.4 (74.1)	18.7 (65.7)	35.3 (95.5)
Mean daily maximum °C (°F)	5.4 (41.7)	5.8 (42.4)	9.1 (48.4)	14.2 (57.6)	19.0 (66.2)	22.4 (72.3)	26.2 (79.2)	28.2 (82.8)	24.8 (76.6)	19.5 (67.1)	14.0 (57.2)	8.5 (47.3)	16.4 (61.6)
Daily mean °C (°F)	3.1 (37.6)	3.1 (37.6)	5.7 (42.3)	10.4 (50.7)	15.1 (59.2)	19.0 (66.2)	23.1 (73.6)	25.0 (77.0)	21.8 (71.2)	16.5 (61.7)	11.0 (51.8)	5.9 (42.6)	13.3 (56.0)
Mean daily minimum °C (°F)	0.7 (33.3)	0.5 (32.9)	2.5 (36.5)	6.8 (44.2)	11.4 (52.5)	15.8 (60.4)	20.5 (68.9)	22.2 (72.0)	18.9 (66.0)	13.4 (56.1)	7.9 (46.2)	3.2 (37.8)	10.3 (50.6)
Record low °C (°F)	−6.3 (20.7)	−7.0 (19.4)	−3.3 (26.1)	−0.8 (30.6)	2.1 (35.8)	7.5 (45.5)	12.3 (54.1)	15.5 (59.9)	9.5 (49.1)	4.2 (39.6)	−0.6 (30.9)	−4.9 (23.2)	−7.0 (19.4)
Average precipitation mm (inches)	133.1 (5.24)	94.3 (3.71)	101.0 (3.98)	104.1 (4.10)	112.3 (4.42)	127.2 (5.01)	216.2 (8.51)	154.0 (6.06)	152.5 (6.00)	161.1 (6.34)	167.7 (6.60)	180.9 (7.12)	1,711.6 (67.39)
Average precipitation days (≥ 1.0 mm)	20.3	16.2	14.6	11.3	10.4	10.0	11.7	9.6	11.6	13.7	16.6	21.6	167.6
Mean monthly sunshine hours	46.1	77.7	149.8	200.1	218.7	189.0	171.9	215.7	159.9	149.2	92.0	51.0	1,723.5
Source: Japan Meteorological Agency

Climate data for Ryōtsu (1991−2020 normals, extremes 1978−present)
Month	Jan	Feb	Mar	Apr	May	Jun	Jul	Aug	Sep	Oct	Nov	Dec	Year
Record high °C (°F)	14.2 (57.6)	19.9 (67.8)	20.5 (68.9)	26.9 (80.4)	29.0 (84.2)	30.7 (87.3)	37.7 (99.9)	38.8 (101.8)	38.2 (100.8)	29.5 (85.1)	23.9 (75.0)	19.0 (66.2)	38.8 (101.8)
Mean daily maximum °C (°F)	5.8 (42.4)	6.2 (43.2)	9.5 (49.1)	14.7 (58.5)	19.7 (67.5)	23.4 (74.1)	27.4 (81.3)	29.6 (85.3)	26.2 (79.2)	20.6 (69.1)	14.6 (58.3)	8.8 (47.8)	17.2 (63.0)
Daily mean °C (°F)	3.0 (37.4)	3.1 (37.6)	5.9 (42.6)	10.8 (51.4)	15.8 (60.4)	20.0 (68.0)	24.2 (75.6)	26.1 (79.0)	22.5 (72.5)	16.8 (62.2)	11.0 (51.8)	5.7 (42.3)	13.7 (56.7)
Mean daily minimum °C (°F)	0.2 (32.4)	0.0 (32.0)	2.2 (36.0)	6.9 (44.4)	12.2 (54.0)	17.0 (62.6)	21.5 (70.7)	23.0 (73.4)	19.2 (66.6)	13.1 (55.6)	7.3 (45.1)	2.5 (36.5)	10.4 (50.8)
Record low °C (°F)	−6.9 (19.6)	−7.1 (19.2)	−4.5 (23.9)	−1.0 (30.2)	3.6 (38.5)	10.4 (50.7)	13.8 (56.8)	16.4 (61.5)	10.8 (51.4)	3.7 (38.7)	−0.8 (30.6)	−4.6 (23.7)	−7.1 (19.2)
Average precipitation mm (inches)	164.3 (6.47)	118.7 (4.67)	109.1 (4.30)	104.6 (4.12)	107.3 (4.22)	138.9 (5.47)	233.2 (9.18)	142.7 (5.62)	136.7 (5.38)	139.2 (5.48)	155.2 (6.11)	210.0 (8.27)	1,758.5 (69.23)
Average precipitation days (≥ 1.0 mm)	23.0	18.1	15.7	11.7	9.7	9.3	11.4	9.1	11.4	12.9	16.9	22.7	171.9
Mean monthly sunshine hours	52.9	79.1	140.7	190.9	216.5	185.1	177.9	219.5	159.9	150.9	99.3	56.9	1,735.7
Source: Japan Meteorological Agency

Climate data for Hamo (1991−2020 normals, extremes 1978−present)
Month	Jan	Feb	Mar	Apr	May	Jun	Jul	Aug	Sep	Oct	Nov	Dec	Year
Record high °C (°F)	15.2 (59.4)	20.0 (68.0)	21.6 (70.9)	28.4 (83.1)	30.6 (87.1)	34.4 (93.9)	37.6 (99.7)	38.2 (100.8)	36.2 (97.2)	31.7 (89.1)	24.1 (75.4)	19.6 (67.3)	38.2 (100.8)
Mean daily maximum °C (°F)	6.0 (42.8)	6.4 (43.5)	9.8 (49.6)	15.6 (60.1)	21.0 (69.8)	24.5 (76.1)	28.0 (82.4)	30.2 (86.4)	26.4 (79.5)	20.7 (69.3)	14.8 (58.6)	9.1 (48.4)	17.7 (63.9)
Daily mean °C (°F)	3.1 (37.6)	3.0 (37.4)	5.6 (42.1)	10.6 (51.1)	15.7 (60.3)	19.9 (67.8)	23.9 (75.0)	25.6 (78.1)	21.7 (71.1)	16.0 (60.8)	10.5 (50.9)	5.7 (42.3)	13.4 (56.2)
Mean daily minimum °C (°F)	0.2 (32.4)	−0.2 (31.6)	1.4 (34.5)	5.8 (42.4)	11.0 (51.8)	15.9 (60.6)	20.6 (69.1)	21.9 (71.4)	18.0 (64.4)	11.9 (53.4)	6.6 (43.9)	2.5 (36.5)	9.6 (49.3)
Record low °C (°F)	−7.5 (18.5)	−7.4 (18.7)	−4.9 (23.2)	−2.9 (26.8)	2.2 (36.0)	7.8 (46.0)	12.2 (54.0)	14.2 (57.6)	9.1 (48.4)	2.4 (36.3)	0.2 (32.4)	−3.9 (25.0)	−7.5 (18.5)
Average precipitation mm (inches)	164.0 (6.46)	109.5 (4.31)	107.2 (4.22)	98.7 (3.89)	98.0 (3.86)	129.6 (5.10)	210.9 (8.30)	143.8 (5.66)	142.7 (5.62)	138.2 (5.44)	173.0 (6.81)	206.3 (8.12)	1,721.7 (67.78)
Average precipitation days (≥ 1.0 mm)	22.8	17.7	16.1	11.6	10.3	9.6	12.2	9.5	11.5	13.6	17.5	22.4	174.8
Mean monthly sunshine hours	56.8	80.6	143.3	185.4	205.4	172.8	164.1	202.8	148.7	146.5	103.7	57.8	1,667.8
Source: Japan Meteorological Agency

== Flora and fauna ==
Because it is located at the junction of warm and cold currents, it is extremely rich in vegetation, making it an extremely rare vegetation area on the island where plants unique to both Hokkaido and Okinawa coexist. It is also blessed with a variety of marine products, such as dolphinfish, bonito, and bigfin squid that appear in warm currents, and yellowtail that appears in cold currents.

Due to the hundreds of thousands of years that have passed since it was isolated from Honshu island, endemic species such as the Sado hare, Sado mole, and Sado shrew can be seen. Although they are now extinct, there was a population of wild boars that was genetically separated from the population of Honshu for hundreds of thousands of years. The Japanese weasel is said to have been re-introduced after becoming locally extinct.

== History ==
Sado Island was originally connected to Honshu, but it separated from Honshu around 16 million years ago due to changes in the topography due to tectonic deformation and volcanic activity, and around 2 million years ago, the ground began to collapse due to compressive kinetic energy in the ocean floor. It is thought that the area rose to its current shape, with the Osado Mountains and Kosado Hills sandwiching the Kuninaka Plain. Uplift continues to this day due to tectonic movements such as earthquakes.

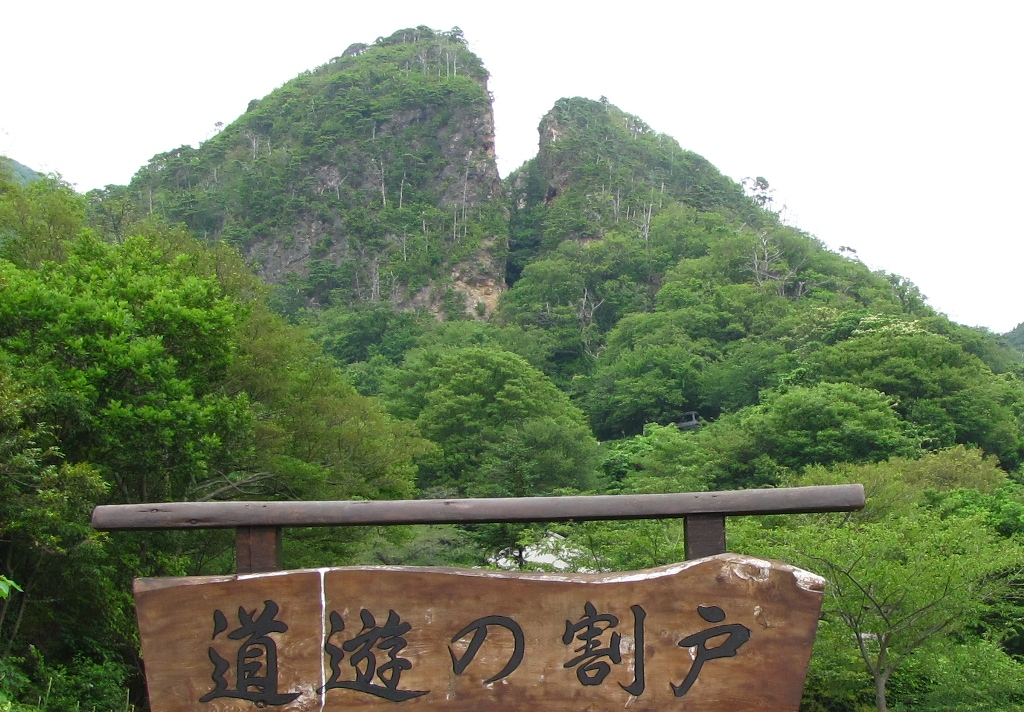
Sado gold mine

With a long history, Sado Island has been inhabited by humans for 10,000 years. Thousands of ruins discovered in the Kanai area included stoneware and hunting equipment from the late Yayoi period. There are also records of Sado in the Kojiki and Nihongi. After the Taika Reform, the central government established the Sado Province on the island, and the local population began to emigrate to Sado Island. At the same time, Sado Island has also become the place where losers of political conflicts or dissidents were exiled. Emperor Juntoku, Nichiren and other people had been exiled to Sado. After the Kamakura period, the Honma clan was appointed as the Shugodai. After 1589 ( Tenshō 17), Uesugi Kagekatsu invaded Sado Island, after which Sado Island was dominated by the Uesugi clan.

In 1601, miners discovered veins of gold and silver in the Aikawa Tsuruko Ginzan, which became the Sado Mine. In 1603 (Keichō 8), Tokugawa Ieyasu classified Sado Island as a territory of the Bakufu immediately after his victory at the Battle of Sekigahara. Sado Mine developed into the largest goldmine in Japan. Its output reached 41 tons by the Bakumatsu period in the mid-19th century, and it played an important role in the financing of the Shogunate. After the middle of the Edo period, the quantity began to decrease, but output rose to the highest level ever, at 400 kg a year, thanks to the introduction of advanced excavation technology during the Meiji era in the late 19th century. Sado Gold Mine closed in 1989. In nearly 400 years of mining history, it produced 78 tons of gold and 2,300 tons of silver.

After the abolition of the han system, the Japanese government established Sado Prefecture on Sado Island, but later renamed it Aikawa Prefecture. In 1876, Aikawa Prefecture was incorporated into Niigata Prefecture. In 2004, ten cities, towns and villages on Sado Island were merged to form Sado City.

=== Forced labor ===
Sado Island was the site of forced labor during World War II, when around 1,500 Koreans were conscripted and forced to work in the mines on the island. The Japanese government, some Japanese scholars, and a minority of international scholars oppose this claim. Koreans are even mentioned in an exhibit in one of the mines, but there is no implication that they were forced to work there.

In 2022, this became the subject of a diplomatic conflict between South Korea and Japan. Japan had previously added Hashima Island, another island where forced labor occurred (which Japan denies), to the UNESCO World Heritage Site list. However, the nomination was only approved because South Korea and Japan had reached a deal where Japan would acknowledge forced labor in its exhibits. Japan, under the guidance of Japanese politician Kōko Katō and Prime Minister Fumio Kishida, went back on its word and created a museum denying that forced labor occurred on Hashima. All other 21 nations of the UNESCO committee agreed that Japan had failed to reach its side of the agreement, but Japan ignored requests to correct the museum. It subsequently filed to have Sado Island added to the list as well, which sparked international and domestic criticism. This request was initially denied due to concerns over how the island's history would be presented. Japan refiled the request on 28 January 2023, with the goal of being added to the list by 2024.

Various sources expressed skepticism on whether the bid would be successful. However, on 27 July 2024, the UNESCO committee unanimously decided to register the Sado Island Gold Mines as a cultural heritage site. The bid gained the support of South Korea following bilateral negotiations between the two countries. The Japanese government established an exhibit about the harsh working conditions, and promised to hold an annual memorial. Additionally, a representative for the Japanese government told the committee that Japan would make efforts to "comprehensively address the whole history of the Sado Island Gold Mines" in consultation with South Korea. The listing has been described as an improvement in Japan-South Korea relations, although it has been met with criticism in South Korea. South Korean President Yoon Suk Yeol's friendlier position to Japan has been analyzed in the context of the approval.

== Population ==
In 1960, Sado Island had a population of 113,296. Due to the inconvenience of living on the outlying islands and lack of jobs, Sado Island has experienced a long-term population decline. In October 2017, the population of Sado Island was 55,212. The total fertility rate of Sado Island is about 1.9, which is much higher than the average of Japan and Niigata Prefecture. However, the continuous outflow of population results in the persistent decrease of population.

== Culture ==
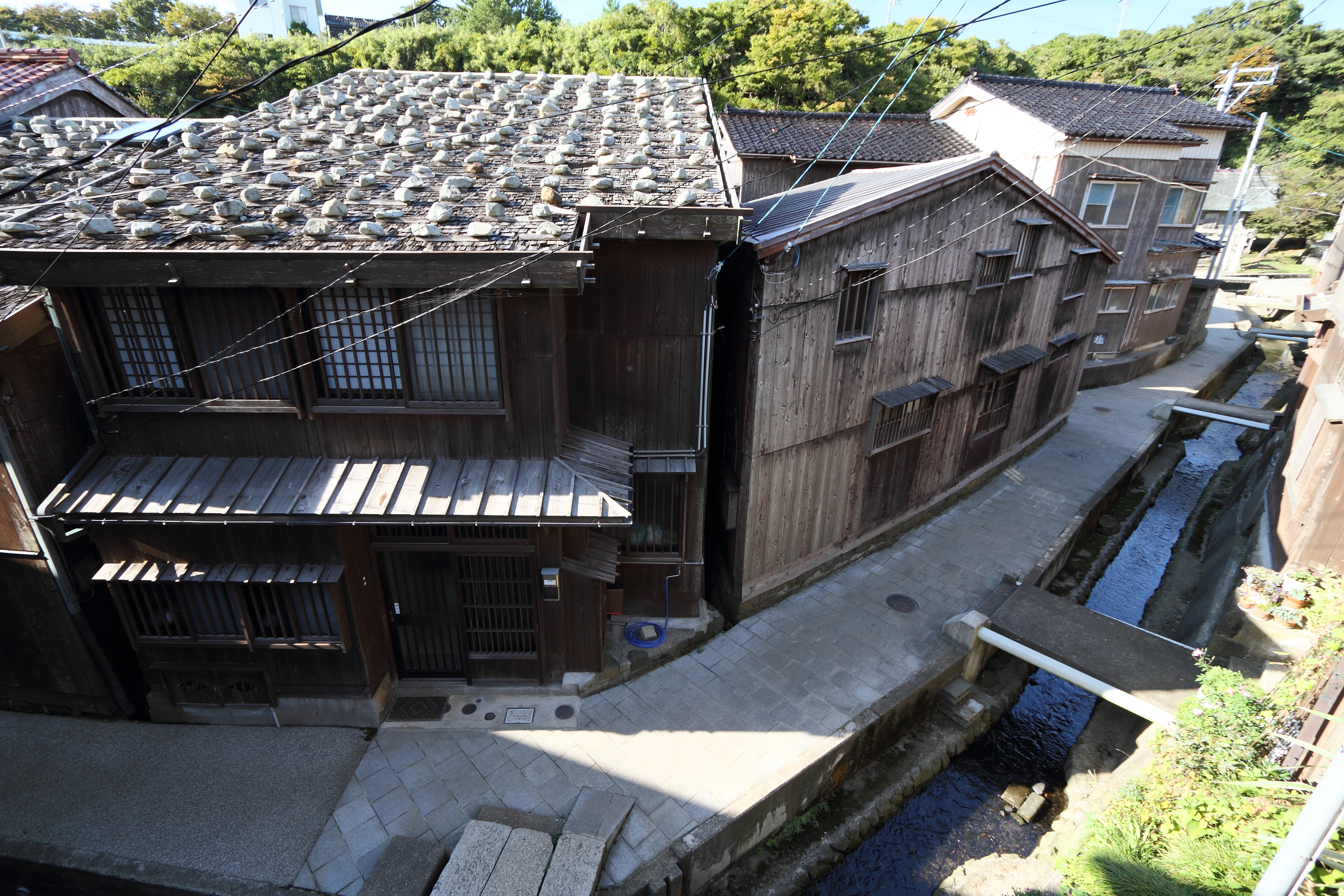
Shukunegi village, base on the Nishimawari naval route

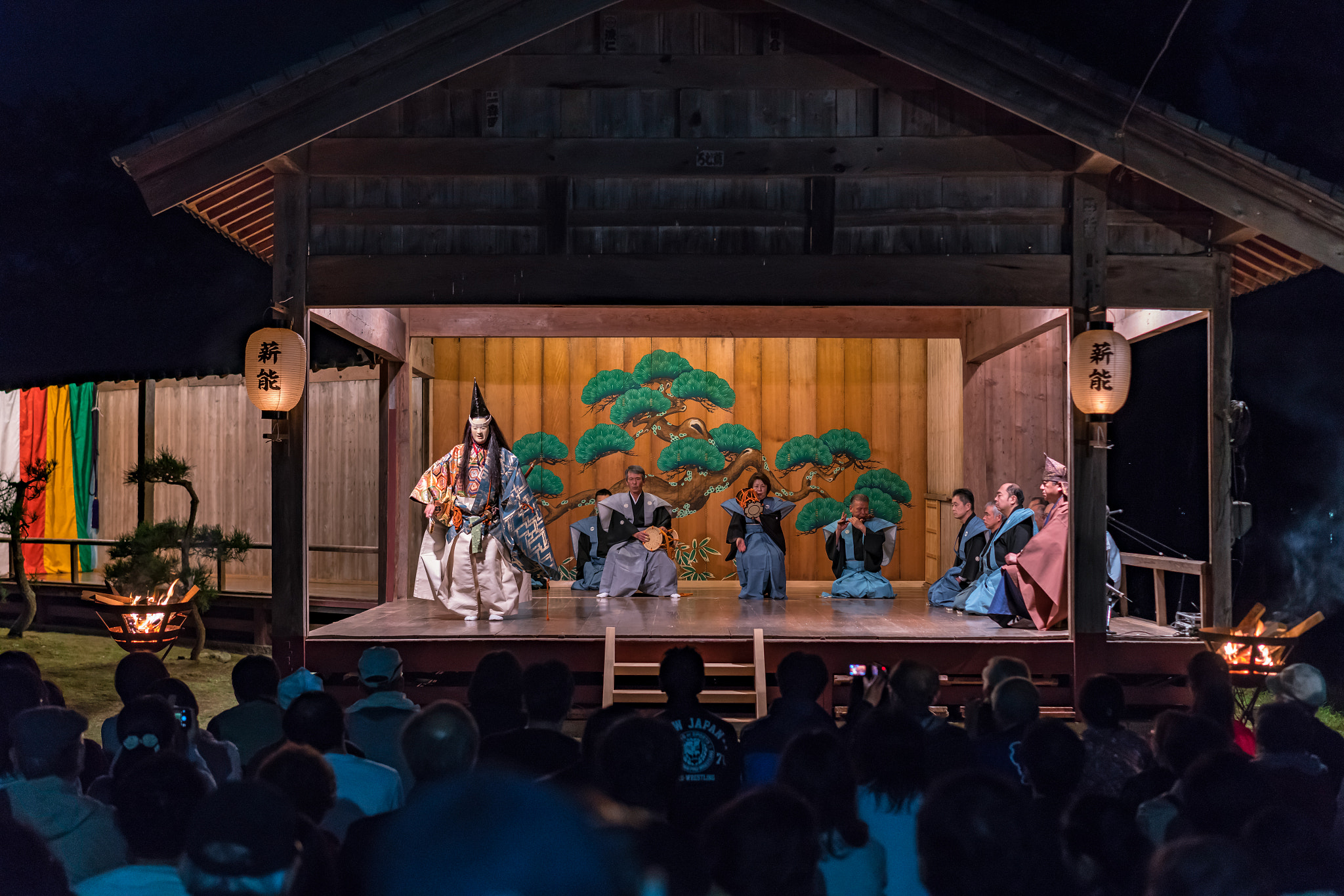
Noh theater in the island

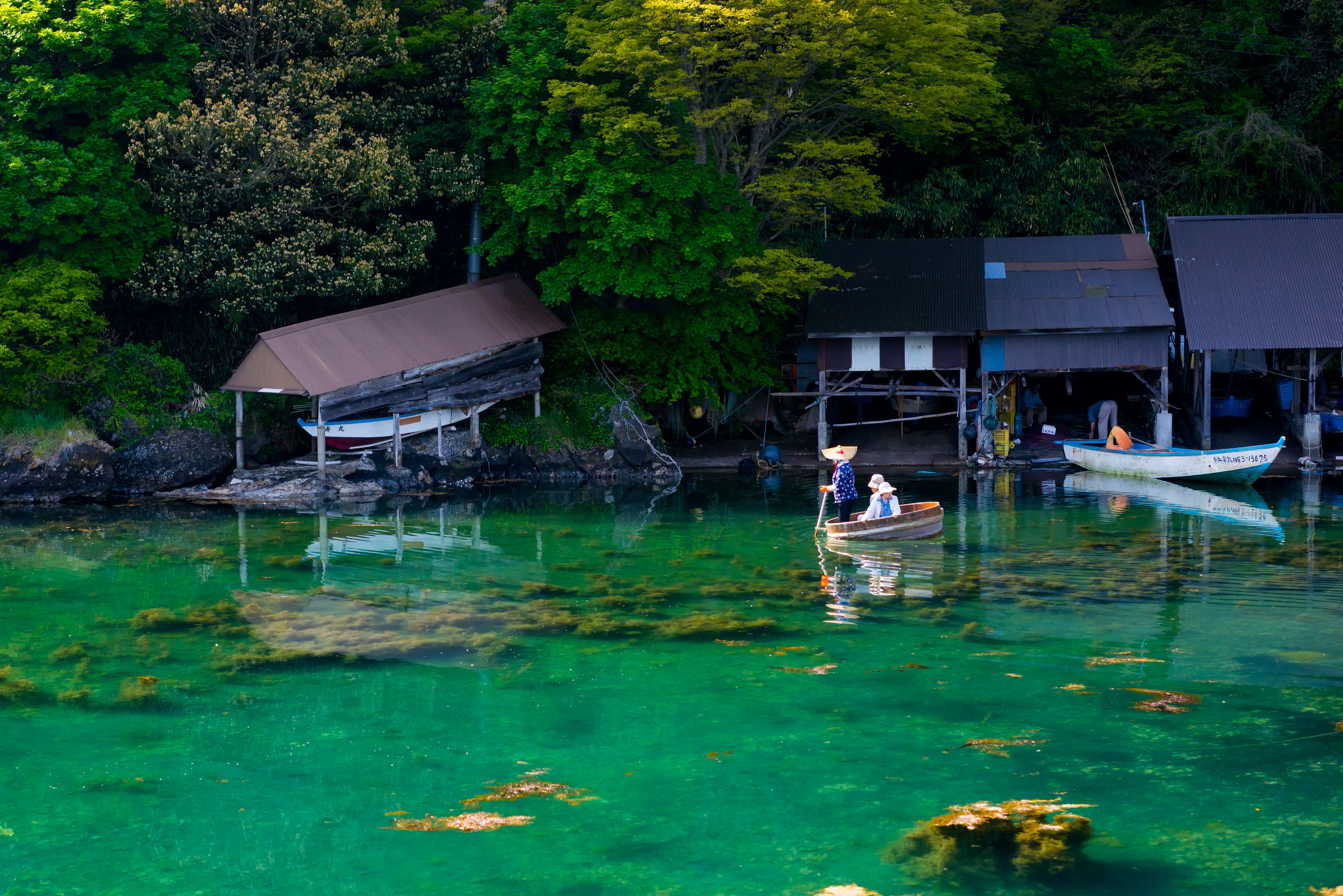
Taraibune boat in Ogi

Since Sado Island is an important trading base on the Nishimawari naval route from the coast of the Japan Sea to Osaka, the culture is strongly influenced by West Japanese culture like Kinki and Hokuriku. Intellectuals and politicians exiled from Kyoto to Sado brought the traditional performance culture of Kyoto, which caused the traditional art of Sado Island to began to thrive. The Noh Master Zeami Motokiyo was exiled to Sado, resulting in the particular development of Noh culture in Sado. In the Edo period, there were more than 200 Noh stages. Sado still has more than 30 Noh stages - ranking first in Japan in the number of Noh stages per capita. There are also local performing arts such as ‘Ghost Taiko’ on Sado Island.

Sado is also home to the Kodō taiko drumming troupe. Kodō are credited with popularizing modern taiko drumming both in Japan and worldwide. Kodō Village is based in the Ogi subdivision.

The round coracle-like Tarai-bune boats were once common in different parts of Japan, but are now only found on Sado.

== See also ==
- Sado, Niigata (municipality)
