= Kinza =

Kinza (金座) was the Tokugawa shogunate's officially sanctioned gold monopoly or gold guild (za) which was created in 1595. Initially, the Tokugawa shogunate was interested in assuring a consistent value in minted gold coins; and this led to the perceived need for attending to the supply of gold.

This bakufu title identifies a regulatory agency with responsibility for supervising the minting of gold coins and for superintending all gold mines, gold mining and gold-extraction activities in Japan.

== See also ==
- Bugyō
- Kinzan-bugyō
- Ginza – Silver za (monopoly office or guild).
- Dōza – Copper za (monopoly office or guild).
- Shuza – Cinnabar za (monopoly office or guild)
