= Ton'ya =

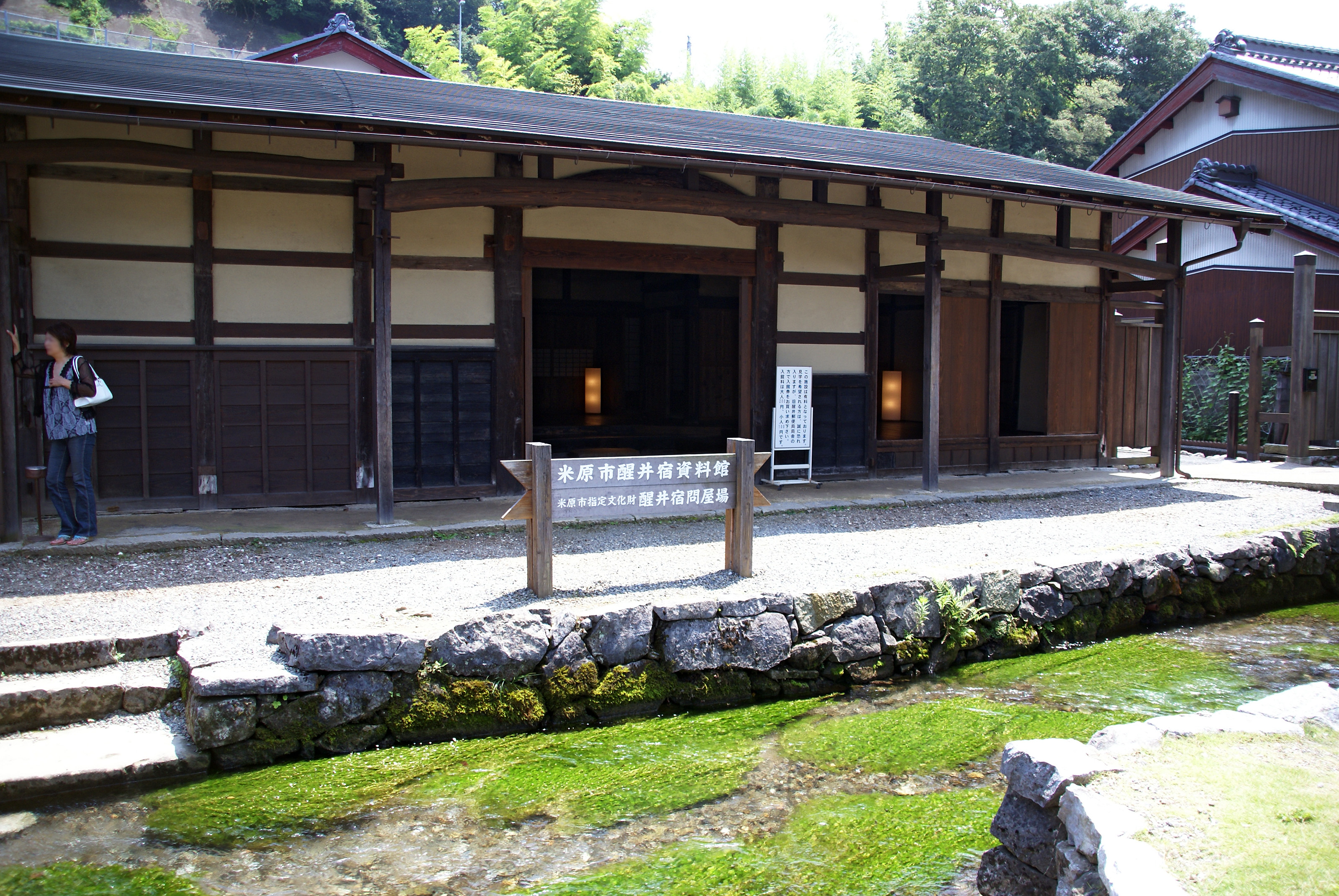
A tonya in Japan which today functions as a museum

Ton'ya (問屋), called toiya outside of Edo, were trade brokers in Japan, primarily wholesalers, warehouse managers, and shipment managers; the term applies equally to the traders themselves and to their shops or warehouses. First appearing as early as the 12th century, ton'ya came to serve a crucial role in the economy of the Edo period (1603–1867).

== History ==
The earliest record of a toi-otoko (問男) may be one from 1175, in which a number of Court officials hire an outside boatsman to transport them down the Yodo River. As he was not a servant or agent of the Court, or any manor, but rather a man hired out privately, this represents the emergence of the sorts of private enterprises which would come to dominate the economy centuries later.

The ton'ya of the Edo period were little different, essentially acting as independent agents for specific elements of the domestic trade; most often they were shippers, but many were local handlers, middlemen, or warehousers. They would be hired by a firm (a merchant, a shop, etc.) which operated out of one of the big cities to manage or handle the firm's goods in some other portion of the country. Wholesale freight shippers operating out of Osaka, transporting goods to Edo, numbered at least 24 in 1700, and a great many "guilds" existed specializing in the handling of individual types of goods, such as cotton, sugar, or paper. In addition, there were groups such as the Satsuma Tonya and the Matsumae clan Tonya, who specialized in the handling and transportation of goods within two of Japan's four great "gates" to the outside world; Matsumae, in Hokkaidō, governed the trade with the Ainu and Imperial Russia, while Satsuma, in Kyūshū, controlled trade with the Ryūkyū Kingdom and, through them, trade with Qing China.

Between the ton'ya and the numerous other types of groups in Osaka and Edo, including kabunakama, rakuza, and rice brokers, Japan's primary urban commercial centers were extremely organized and powerful by the middle of the Edo period. Most of these groups would dissolve or evolve into something else entirely by the end of the Edo period, but they served an important role in facilitating the emergence of fully nationwide trade in early modern Japan.

== See also ==
- Honjin
- Hatago
- Chaya
