= Honma clan =

Japanese clan

Honma 本間
- Family crest of the Honma clan
- Home province: Sado
- Parent house: Yokoyama clan (allegedly)
- Founding year: 12th century
- Ruled until: 1589, defeat by Uesugi Kagekatsu
- Cadet branches: Hamochi-Homma; Kawarada-Homma; Sakata-Homma

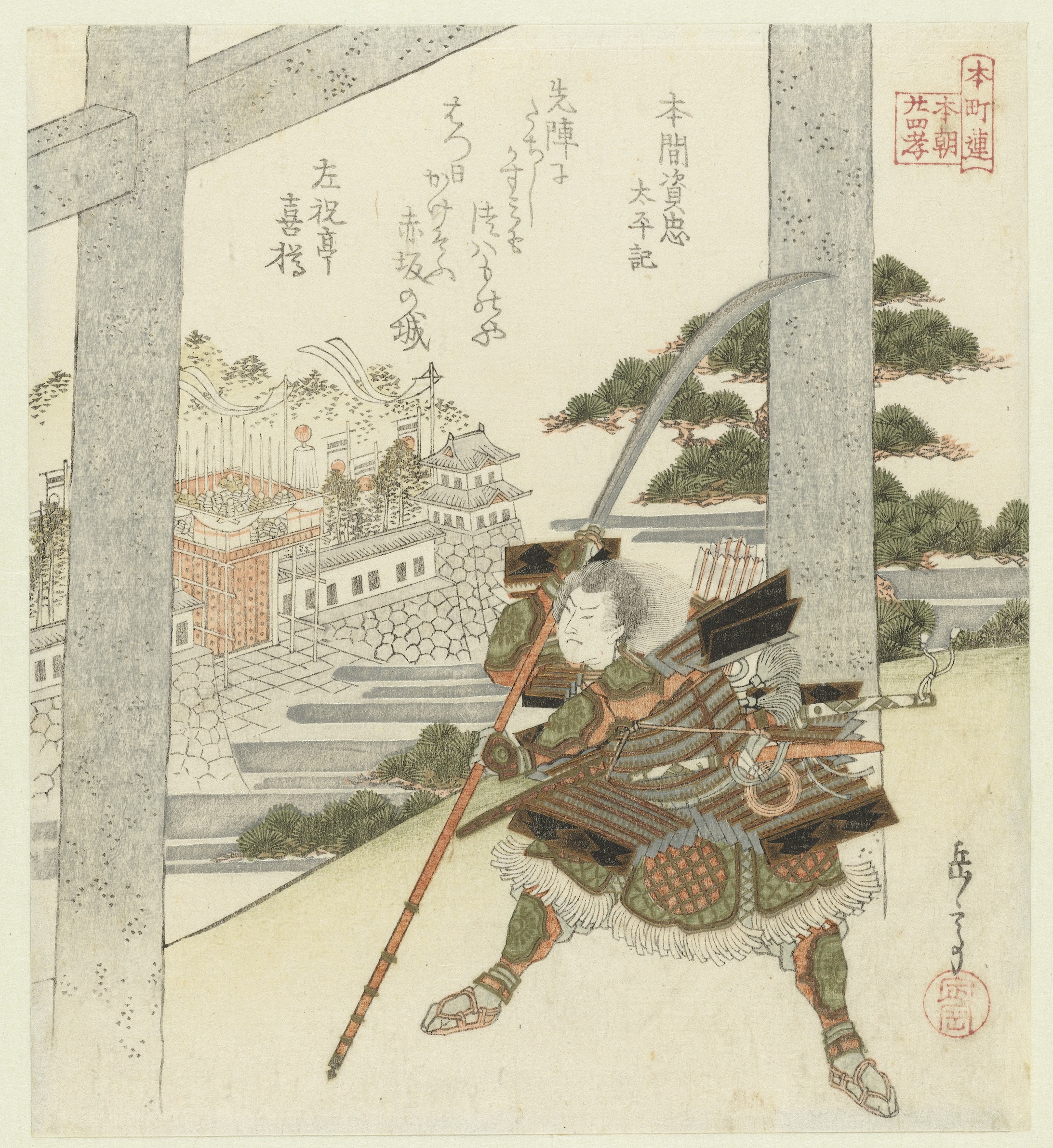
Homma Suketada, a young warrior who died in the Genkō War (1333). He was featured in Vol. 6 of the historical epic Taiheiki (太平記).

Honma (本間) is a Japanese clan.

Honma Yoshihisa was appointed shugodai of Sado in 1185. The clan established its rule from Sawata. The clan gave birth to two new branches, the Hamochi-Honma and the Kawaharada-Honma. Those two branches eventually prevailed over the head clan and opposed each other. Uesugi Kenshin, ruler of the Echigo Province at the time, settled the ongoing conflicts between Hamochi-Honma and Kawaharada-Honma. His death sparked a new rows of hostilities between the two branches, but Uesugi Kagekatsu invaded Sado in 1589, putting an end to the ruling of the clan.
