= Sado Province =

Former province of Japan

Map of Japanese provinces (1868) with Sado Province highlighted

Sado Province (佐渡国, Sado no Kuni; Japanese pronunciation: [sä́.dò̞ (nò̞ kɯ̈̀.ɲ̟ì)]) was a province of Japan until 1871; since then, it has been a part of Niigata Prefecture. It was sometimes called Sashū (佐州) or Toshū (渡州). It lies on the eponymous Sado Island, off the coast of Niigata Prefecture (or in the past, Echigo Province).

Sado was famous for the silver and gold mined on the island. In the Kamakura Period, the province was granted to the Honma clan from Honshū, and they continued to dominate Sado until 1589, when Uesugi Kagekatsu of Echigo Province took over the island. The Tokugawa shōguns later made Sado a personal fief after Sekigahara, and assumed direct control of its mines.

Since 2004 Sado city has comprised the entire island.

== Historical districts ==
- Niigata Prefecture
  - Hamochi District (羽茂郡) - merged with Kamo and Sawata Districts to become Sado District (佐渡郡) on April 1, 1896
  - Kamo District (賀茂郡) - merged with Hamochi and Sawata Districts to become Sado District on April 1, 1896
  - Sawata District (雑太郡) - merged with Hamochi and Kamo Districts to become Sado District on April 1, 1896
