= Rice broker =

Forerunners to bankers in feudal Japan

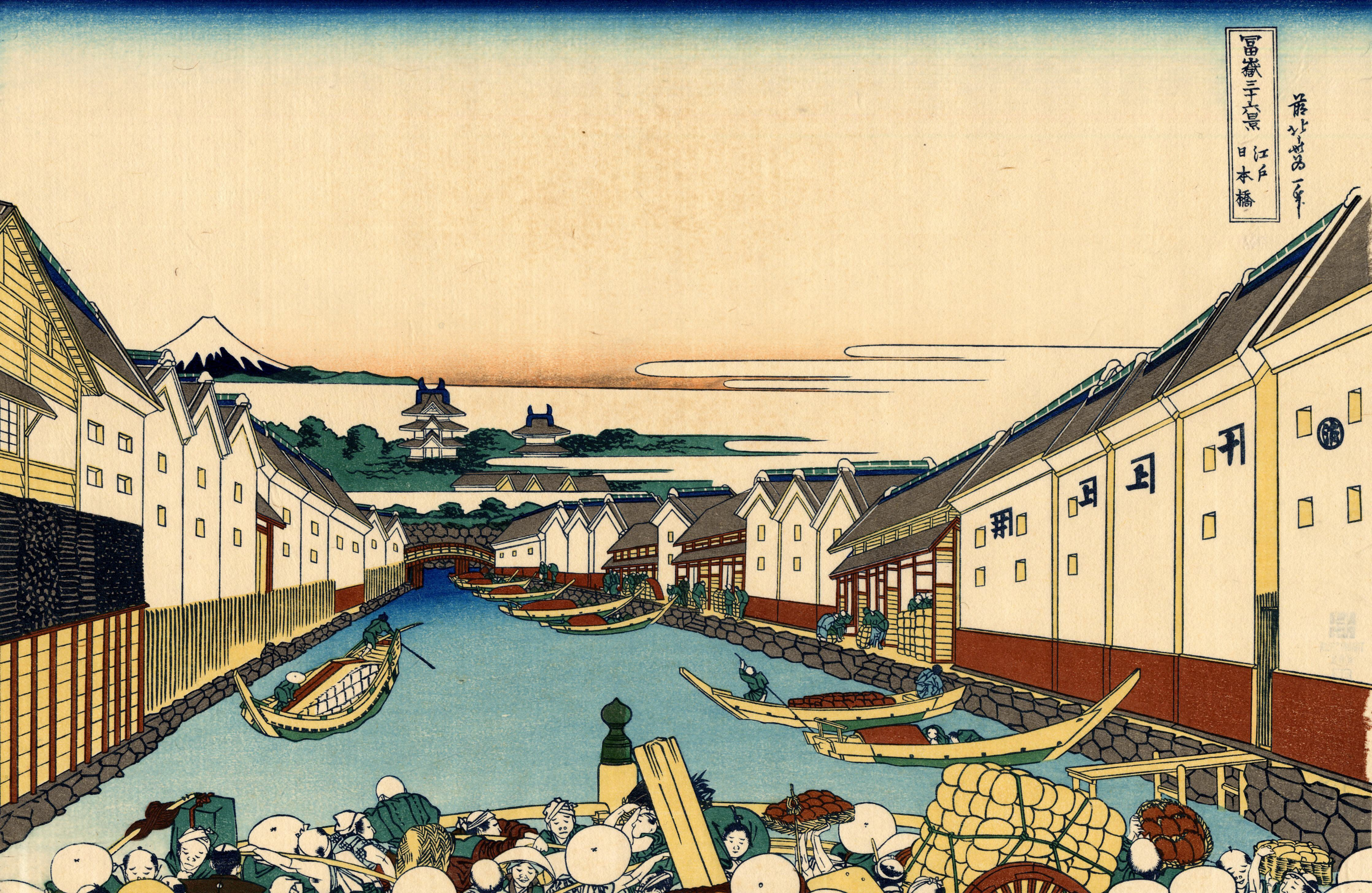
Nihonbashi bridge in Edo, Rice brokers." 36 Views of Mount Fuji " Hokusai.

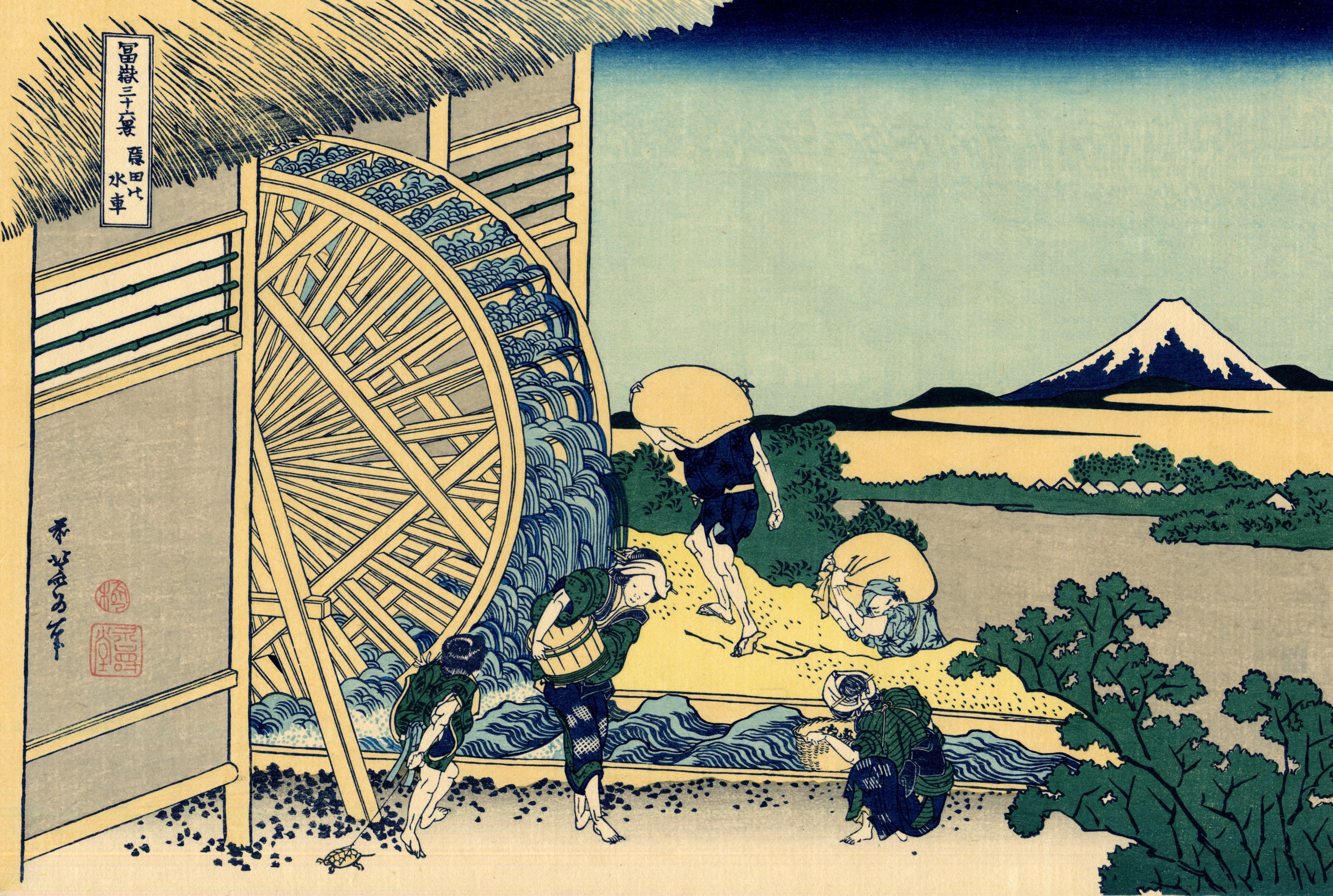
Rice polishing by water mill in early modern Japan. " 36 Views of Mount Fuji " Hokusai.

Rice brokers, which rose to power and significance in Osaka and Edo in the Edo period (1603-1867) of Japanese history, were the forerunners to Japan's banking system. The concept originally arose in Kyoto several hundred years earlier; the early rice brokers of Kyoto, however, operated somewhat differently, and were ultimately not nearly as powerful or economically influential as the later Osaka system would be.

Daimyōs (feudal lords) received most of their income in the form of rice. Merchants in Osaka and Edo thus began to organize storehouses where they would store a daimyō's rice in exchange for a fee, trading it for either coin or a form of receipt; essentially a precursor to paper money. Many if not all of these rice brokers also made loans, and would become quite wealthy and powerful. As the Edo period wore on, daimyōs grew poorer and began taking out more loans, increasing the social position of the rice brokers.

Rice brokers also managed, to a great extent, the transportation of rice around the country, organizing the income and wealth of many daimyōs and paying taxes on behalf of the daimyōs out of their storehouses.

== Kyoto ==
As urbanization and other economic shifts became significantly widespread and powerful in the 14th century, the growth of towns created a growth in demand for the transport of produce, particularly rice, into the towns, from increasingly larger and further rural areas. As a result, a system of material transport and warehousing in Kyoto emerged. This process was much the same as the one which would catapult Japan into the modern era in the Edo period, but on a smaller scale, more localized around the Kinai area, and centered at Kyoto instead of Osaka, which would become the commercial center of a nationwide trade system three hundred years later.

Rice dealers in Kyoto gained business very quickly, and became increasingly organized over the course of the 14th century; by 1400, the need for a central rice market was felt. Established sometime around that year, the Kyoto central rice market set rice prices by an auctioning system, determining, powerfully but indirectly, prices across the country. This effect was enhanced by the tight monopolistic control of the merchants of this central market over the rice trade across the entire city; nowhere else was wholesale trade in rice permitted. As the business grew, the rice dealers developed among their membership transporters and guards who tightly controlled the flow of rice into the city. These jobs would become more specialized and organized as the 15th century went on, developing into distinctly separate branches of the guild.

An incident in 1431 illustrates the power of the Kyoto rice merchants; they conspired to cut down on the supply of rice to the market, in order to drive prices up. Ordered by the Imperial Court to resume selling rice at a fair rate, they did so for one day and then stopped selling rice altogether. When the Deputy-Governor of the Samurai-dokoro was sent to arrest and punish the ringleaders, little was done, as the Deputy-Governor was party to the conspiracy. The merchants continued to abuse their power, encouraged by the ease of doing so and the rampant corruption which spread as high up as the wife of Shōgun Ashikaga Yoshimasa.

Cattle brokers, and merchants of marine products such as salt and fish saw significant growth and development in this period as well. Kyoto also saw the continuing emergence and development of a monetary economy. Rice would not be fully replaced by coin, however, until the late Edo or early Meiji periods.

The economy of Kyoto, at least in the eyes (and coffers) of the merchants, flourished in the first two-thirds of the 15th century. The outbreak of the Ōnin War, however, in 1467, brought these developments, and the merchants behind them to an abrupt halt. The various shops and warehouses that made up the central rice market were quickly sold for very low prices, and the city saw terrible violence and destruction in the ensuing years.

== Osaka ==
By 1700 or so, Osaka had become the mercantile center of Japan. Osaka merchants had organized themselves into a national clearinghouse system. A major obstacle to the development of a modern capitalistic system in Japan at this time was the problem of transportation. While some commodities, such as woven silk and sake could be transported easily in a cart, most crops were harvested in such volume that a caravan of packhorses or carts across the rough and dangerous roads, transported by the individual farmers, simply could not work out. Thus, a number of towns served as waystations where merchants would act as middlemen, storing farmers’ goods and transporting them to major trade centers such as Osaka, for a price. However, increasing supply and demand towards the end of the 17th century necessitated a better method of transporting goods in large amounts. Merchants in Sakai, Osaka, and a number of other ports addressed this problem, testing the use of large ships to transport goods along the coasts. By the end of the 17th century, Osaka was home to at least 24 freight shippers to Edo, and a complex system of guilds, both in Osaka proper and in the surrounding area, dealing in cotton, sugar, paper, and the produce of particular regions.

Daimyō income at this time was in the form of koku of rice, an amount equal to the amount of rice a man eats in a year. Though there was a unified national system of coinage, every feudal domain was free to mint its own coinage as well. Thus, paying for hotels, inns, and food were complicated and difficult affairs for daimyōs traveling to or from Edo as mandated by the shogunate's sankin kōtai (alternate attendance) system.

Thus, a system of rice warehouses arose, evolving naturally out of the rice storehouses which formed a part of this trade network. Centered in Osaka, the rice brokers bought the daimyō's rice and issued paper bills, representations of value, in exchange. This was probably the first paper money in Japan, but the concept was picked up quickly, and the credit of the brokers was good enough to warrant the kind of trust that such a system relies upon. Many merchants throughout the country were willing to exchange the paper bills for metal coins or bars, recognizing that the Osaka brokers would take back the bills, as payment for rice.

Soon afterwards, these rice brokers took the next natural, logical, step towards becoming true financial institutions. They began to loan the paper money to daimyōs and samurai, who promised to pay it back with the tax revenue of future seasons. For a time, this worked quite well for both samurai and brokers, whose system developed into something much more akin to a modern bank; transactions began to be done entirely in paper, with the rice only nominally serving as reserve backing. This, however, quickly led to the problem of samurai living beyond their means, spending more in order to maintain the kind of lifestyle expected of their status than they could hope to repay. The rice brokers, more often than not, found it easiest to simply allow samurai and daimyōs to postpone repayment of the loans, or to default on them entirely. The last decade or so of the 17th century, the Genroku period, is today widely considered to have been the peak of Edo period extravagance; daimyōs and samurai spent beyond their means, and merchants, who on the whole enjoyed immense profits, spent frivolously as well.

This inflated economy came crashing down at the end of Genroku, in the first decade of the 18th century. By this point, many samurai and daimyōs were so indebted to the brokers that they could never hope to be able to pay them back; this was a huge problem for the brokers. A new shōgun came to power at this time, motivated by Confucian ideals and seeking reform. Thus, the shogunate stepped in, and sought to control the country's economic development, and the growing wealth and power of the merchant class, by organizing and regulating a series of guilds, and by passing strict sumptuary laws forbidding merchants from behaving like higher-class citizens (i.e. samurai, nobles). Sanctioned and encouraged by the shogunate, the Dōjima Rice Exchange was born, incorporating and organizing the rice brokers in the north of Osaka. The system became formally backed by the shogunate, who acted through the Rice Exchange to affect monetary policy.

Over the course of the 17th and 18th centuries, these Osaka-based institutions grew more solidly into what can legitimately be called banks, focusing their efforts largely on loans to the daimyōs. However, as the peace and stability caused the feudal system to break down, daimyōs became less and less able to pay back the loans, and an incredible volume of debts were simply rolled over or ignored. The money supply the banks had created also grew out of control, becoming an essential aspect of the nation’s economy, causing serious economic consequences whenever it was altered. The shogunate tried to repair and regulate the economy, in particular the monetary supply and monetary value of rice, but to no avail. Seemingly, if anyone understood the economic developments incurred by the rice-brokers, it was the rice-brokers alone. Since the samurai's income was in fixed amounts of rice, not monetary value, the debasement of the value of rice affected their wealth drastically, and the inflation created by governmental attempts to control the supply of metal coinage had similar effects. In all of this turmoil, the rice-brokers were nearly the only ones to profit.

At the beginning of the 19th century, in response to growing inflation, and to the power of the rice brokers, and the merchant class in general, the shogunate once again imposed a series of heavy regulations and restrictions. Easily one of the most damaging was a proscription against receiving loan payments from daimyōs. By the 1860s, which saw the end of the Tokugawa shogunate, the Osaka rice brokers had also disappeared, replaced by other merchant institutions.

== Edo ==
The rice brokers in Edo were called fudasashi (札差, "note/bill exchange"), and were located in the kuramae (蔵前, "before the storehouses") section of Asakusa. A very profitable business, fudasashi acted both as usurers and as middlemen organizing the logistics of daimyō tax payments to the shogunate. The rice brokers, like other elements of the chōnin (townspeople) society in Edo, were frequent patrons of the kabuki theatre, Yoshiwara pleasure district, and other aspects of the urban culture of the time.

== See also ==
- ton'ya – a type of guild
- za – another style of guild
