= Kinzan-bugyō =

Kinzan-bugyō (金山奉行) were officials of the Tokugawa shogunate in Edo period Japan.

This bakufu title identifies an official with responsibility for superintending all mines, mining and metals-extraction activities in Japan.

== List of kinzan-bugyō ==
- Kakizaki Sakuzaemon

== See also ==
- Bugyō
- Kinza – Gold za (monopoly office or guild).
- Ginza – Silver za (monopoly office or guild).
- Dōza – Copper za (monopoly office or guild).
