= Kabunakama =

Merchant guilds in Edo period Japan

Kabunakama (株仲間) were merchant guilds in Edo period Japan, which developed out of the basic merchants' associations known as nakama. The kabunakama were entrusted by the shogunate to manage their respective trades, and were allowed to enjoy a monopoly in their given field.

Some kabunakama, known as gomen-kabu, were even allowed to set prices and manage the operations of other nakama. Though the shogunate originally opposed monopolies, they eventually gave in to the increasing numbers and organization of merchants' associations, and decided to make an attempt to control them by officially licensing them. In 1721, the government began to authorize individual nakama to become kabunakama (kabu refers to "shares", though these were themselves not tradeable), and to oversee the organization and trade within given fields. The goal was to encourage cooperation, not competition, and always to work towards the goal of advancing the economy. It is said that these groups became quite social and merchants' moral codes thus developed to a significant degree. Those who were not following ethical market behavior, behaving uncooperatively, or encouraging competition, were shunned by their kabunakama comrades, and likely by the larger market community.

The structure was originally created to replace older guilds, known as za, and by 1785, there were over one hundred kabunakama in Osaka alone, including a number granted special privileges by the shogunate, but taxed heavily in exchange. Some of these were groups entrusted and authorized to control the nation's trade in precious metals, iron, and copper.

In the 1840s, rōjū Mizuno Tadakuni attempted to do away with the kabunakama, in order to combat monopolies, but this and many of his other reforms were resisted so strongly by the merchants of Osaka (and others) that he was forced to abandon his efforts. The kabunakama were all dissolved, however, in 1870 as the economy modernized and new forms of business associations appeared.
