= List of Japanese prefectures by population =

Japanese prefectures by annual population change, in percent (Oct 1, 2021 to Oct 1, 2022).

Japanese prefectures by population density (2022). The tan color means between 0 and 99 per km^{2}.

These are lists of the 47 Japanese prefectures by population at different points in time. For details on the administrative divisions of Japan, see Prefectures of Japan.

== Prefectures of Japan ranked by population as of October 1, 2025 ==
Rank (Note: Ranked by 2025 population.)	Prefecture	Capital	Est. Area (km)	Census Population Oct 1, 2020	Census Population Oct 1, 2025	Population Change, 2020–2025	% Change, 2020–2025	2020 Population Density (/km)	2025 Population Density (/km)
1	Tokyo-to	Shinjuku-ku	2,194.03	14,047,594	14,246,219	198,625	1.41%	6,402.64	6,493.17
2	Kanagawa-ken	Yokohama-shi	2,416.11	9,237,337	9,193,657	-43,680	-0.47%	3,823.23	3,805.15
3	Ōsaka-fu	Ōsaka-shi	1,905.32	8,837,685	8,764,578	-73,107	-0.83%	4,638.43	4,600.06
4	Aichi-ken	Nagoya-shi	5,173.07	7,542,415	7,449,403	-93,012	-1.23%	1,458.02	1,440.04
5	Saitama-ken	Saitama-shi	3,797.75	7,344,765	7,287,169	-57,596	-0.78%	1,933.98	1,918.81
6	Chiba-ken	Chiba-shi	5,157.57	6,284,480	6,258,512	-25,968	-0.41%	1,218.50	1,213.46
7	Hyōgo-ken	Kōbe-shi	8,401.02	5,465,002	5,323,825	-141,177	-2.58%	650.52	633.71
8	Fukuoka-ken	Fukuoka-shi	4,986.51	5,135,214	5,081,879	-53,335	-1.04%	1,029.82	1,019.13
9	Hokkaido	Sapporo-shi	83,424.44	5,224,614	4,985,419	-239,195	-4.58%	62.63	59.76
10	Shizuoka-ken	Shizuoka-shi	7,777.35	3,633,202	3,468,845	-164,357	-4.52%	467.15	446.02
11	Ibaraki-ken	Mito-shi	6,097.39	2,867,009	2,791,207	-75,802	-2.64%	470.20	457.77
12	Hiroshima-ken	Hiroshima-shi	8,479.65	2,799,702	2,683,399	-116,303	-4.15%	330.17	316.45
13	Kyōto-fu	Kyōto-shi	4,612.20	2,578,087	2,502,747	-75,340	-2.92%	558.97	542.64
14	Miyagi-ken	Sendai-shi	7,282.29	2,301,996	2,227,240	-74,756	-3.25%	316.11	305.84
15	Niigata-ken	Niigata-shi	12,583.96	2,201,272	2,068,476	-132,796	-6.03%	174.93	164.37
16	Nagano-ken	Nagano-shi	13,561.56	2,048,011	1,954,950	-93,061	-4.54%	151.02	144.15
17	Gifu-ken	Gifu-shi	10,621.29	1,978,742	1,891,489	-87,253	-4.41%	186.30	178.08
18	Gunma-ken	Maebashi-shi	6,362.28	1,939,110	1,867,582	-71,528	-3.69%	304.78	293.54
19	Tochigi-ken	Utsunomiya-shi	6,408.09	1,933,146	1,864,833	-68,313	-3.53%	301.67	291.01
20	Okayama-ken	Okayama-shi	7,114.33	1,888,432	1,808,664	-79,768	-4.22%	265.44	254.23
21	Fukushima-ken	Fukushima-shi	13,784.14	1,833,152	1,711,937	-121,215	-6.61%	132.99	124.20
22	Mie-ken	Tsu-shi	5,774.49	1,770,254	1,694,896	-75,358	-4.26%	306.56	293.51
23	Kumamoto-ken	Kumamoto-shi	7,409.46	1,738,301	1,678,090	-60,211	-3.46%	234.61	226.48
24	Kagoshima-ken	Kagoshima-shi	9,187.06	1,588,256	1,512,969	-75,287	-4.74%	172.88	164.68
25	Okinawa-ken	Naha-shi	2,282.59	1,467,480	1,468,220	740	0.05%	642.90	643.23
26	Shiga-ken	Ōtsu-shi	4,017.38	1,413,610	1,392,439	-21,171	-1.50%	351.87	346.60
27	Nara-ken	Nara-shi	3,690.94	1,324,473	1,269,180	-55,293	-4.17%	358.84	343.86
28	Yamaguchi-ken	Yamaguchi-shi	6,112.54	1,342,059	1,264,006	-78,053	-5.82%	219.56	206.79
29	Ehime-ken	Matsuyama-shi	5,676.19	1,334,841	1,260,088	-74,753	-5.60%	235.16	222.00
30	Nagasaki-ken	Nagasaki-shi	4,130.98	1,312,317	1,232,190	-80,127	-6.11%	317.68	298.28
31	Aomori-ken	Aomori-shi	9,645.64	1,237,984	1,140,395	-97,589	-7.88%	128.35	118.23
32	Iwate-ken	Morioka-shi	15,275.01	1,210,534	1,125,502	-85,032	-7.02%	79.25	73.68
33	Ishikawa-ken	Kanazawa-shi	4,190.94	1,132,526	1,088,221	-44,305	-3.91%	270.23	259.66
34	Ōita-ken	Ōita-shi	6,340.76	1,123,852	1,076,875	-46,977	-4.18%	177.24	169.83
35	Miyazaki-ken	Miyazaki-shi	7,735.22	1,069,576	1,018,904	-50,672	-4.74%	138.27	131.72
36	Yamagata-ken	Yamagata-shi	9,323.15	1,068,027	993,127	-74,900	-7.01%	114.56	106.52
37	Toyama-ken	Toyama-shi	4,247.58	1,034,814	985,675	-49,139	-4.75%	243.62	232.06
38	Kagawa-ken	Takamatsu-shi	1,876.78	950,244	907,725	-42,519	-4.47%	506.32	483.66
39	Akita-ken	Akita-shi	11,637.52	959,502	882,100	-77,402	-8.07%	82.45	75.80
40	Wakayama-ken	Wakayama-shi	4,724.65	922,584	864,262	-58,322	-6.32%	195.27	182.93
41	Saga-ken	Saga-shi	2,440.69	811,442	781,214	-30,228	-3.73%	332.46	320.08
42	Yamanashi-ken	Kōfu-shi	4,465.27	809,974	779,912	-30,062	-3.71%	181.39	174.66
43	Fukui-ken	Fukui-shi	4,190.52	766,863	729,386	-37,477	-4.89%	183.00	174.06
44	Tokushima-ken	Tokushima-shi	4,146.75	719,559	675,489	-44,070	-6.12%	173.52	162.90
45	Kōchi-ken	Kōchi-shi	7,103.63	691,527	643,437	-48,090	-6.95%	97.35	90.58
46	Shimane-ken	Matsue-shi	6,707.89	671,126	629,460	-41,666	-6.21%	100.05	93.84
47	Tottori-ken	Tottori-shi	3,507.14	553,407	523,732	-29,675	-5.36%	157.79	149.33
	Japan	Tōkyō-to	377,981.12	126,146,099	123,049,524	-3,096,575	-2.45%	333.74	325.54

== Prefectures of Japan ranked by population as of October 1, 2020 ==
Rank (Note: Ranked by 2020 population.)	Prefecture	Capital	Est. Area (km)	Census Population Oct 1, 2015	Census Population Oct 1, 2020	Population Change 2015–2020	% Change	2015 Population Density (/km)	2020 Population Density (/km)
1	Tokyo-to	Shinjuku-ku	2,194.03	13,513,734	14,047,594	533,860	3.95%	6,159.32	6,402.64
2	Kanagawa-ken	Yokohama-shi	2,416.11	9,127,323	9,237,337	110,014	1.21%	3,777.69	3,823.23
3	Ōsaka-fu	Ōsaka-shi	1,905.32	8,838,908	8,837,685	-1,223	-0.01%	4,639.07	4,638.43
4	Aichi-ken	Nagoya-shi	5,173.07	7,484,094	7,542,415	58,321	0.78%	1,446.74	1,458.02
5	Saitama-ken	Saitama-shi	3,797.75	7,261,271	7,344,765	83,494	1.15%	1,911.99	1,933.98
6	Chiba-ken	Chiba-shi	5,157.57	6,224,027	6,284,480	60,453	0.97%	1,206.78	1,218.50
7	Hyōgo-ken	Kōbe-shi	8,401.02	5,536,989	5,465,002	-71,987	-1.3%	659.09	650.52
8	Hokkaido	Sapporo-shi	83,424.44	5,383,579	5,224,614	-158,965	-2.95%	64.53	62.63
9	Fukuoka-ken	Fukuoka-shi	4,986.51	5,102,871	5,135,214	32,343	0.63%	1,023.34	1,029.82
10	Shizuoka-ken	Shizuoka-shi	7,777.35	3,701,181	3,633,202	-67,979	-1.84%	475.89	467.15
11	Ibaraki-ken	Mito-shi	6,097.39	2,917,857	2,867,009	-50,848	-1.74%	478.54	470.20
12	Hiroshima-ken	Hiroshima-shi	8,479.65	2,844,963	2,799,702	-45,261	-1.59%	335.50	330.17
13	Kyōto-fu	Kyōto-shi	4,612.20	2,610,140	2,578,087	-32,053	-1.23%	565.92	558.97
14	Miyagi-ken	Sendai-shi	7,282.29	2,334,215	2,301,996	-32,219	-1.38%	320.53	316.11
15	Niigata-ken	Niigata-shi	12,583.96	2,305,098	2,201,272	-103,826	-4.5%	183.18	174.93
16	Nagano-ken	Nagano-shi	13,561.56	2,099,759	2,048,011	-51,748	-2.46%	154.83	151.02
17	Gifu-ken	Gifu-shi	10,621.29	2,032,533	1,978,742	-53,791	-2.65%	191.36	186.30
18	Gunma-ken	Maebashi-shi	6,362.28	1,973,476	1,939,110	-34,366	-1.74%	310.18	304.78
19	Tochigi-ken	Utsunomiya-shi	6,408.09	1,974,671	1,933,146	-41,525	-2.1%	308.15	301.67
20	Okayama-ken	Okayama-shi	7,114.33	1,922,181	1,888,432	-33,749	-1.76%	270.18	265.44
21	Fukushima-ken	Fukushima-shi	13,784.14	1,913,606	1,833,152	-80,454	-4.2%	138.83	132.99
22	Mie-ken	Tsu-shi	5,774.49	1,815,827	1,770,254	-45,573	-2.51%	314.46	306.56
23	Kumamoto-ken	Kumamoto-shi	7,409.46	1,786,969	1,738,301	-48,668	-2.72%	241.17	234.61
24	Kagoshima-ken	Kagoshima-shi	9,187.06	1,648,752	1,588,256	-60,496	-3.67%	179.46	172.88
25	Okinawa-ken	Naha-shi	2,282.59	1,434,138	1,467,480	33,342	2.32%	628.29	642.90
26	Shiga-ken	Ōtsu-shi	4,017.38	1,413,184	1,413,610	426	0.03%	351.77	351.87
27	Yamaguchi-ken	Yamaguchi-shi	6,112.54	1,405,007	1,342,059	-62,948	-4.48%	229.86	219.56
28	Ehime-ken	Matsuyama-shi	5,676.19	1,385,840	1,334,841	-50,999	-3.68%	244.15	235.16
29	Nara-ken	Nara-shi	3,690.94	1,365,008	1,324,473	-40,535	-2.97%	369.83	358.84
30	Nagasaki-ken	Nagasaki-shi	4,130.98	1,377,780	1,312,317	-65,463	-4.75%	333.52	317.68
31	Aomori-ken	Aomori-shi	9,645.64	1,308,649	1,237,984	-70,665	-5.4%	135.67	128.35
32	Iwate-ken	Morioka-shi	15,275.01	1,279,814	1,210,534	-69,280	-5.41%	83.78	79.25
33	Ishikawa-ken	Kanazawa-shi	4,190.94	1,154,343	1,132,526	-21,817	-1.89%	275.44	270.23
34	Ōita-ken	Ōita-shi	6,340.76	1,166,729	1,123,852	-42,877	-3.67%	184.00	177.24
35	Miyazaki-ken	Miyazaki-shi	7,735.22	1,104,377	1,069,576	-34,801	-3.15%	142.77	138.27
36	Yamagata-ken	Yamagata-shi	9,323.15	1,122,957	1,068,027	-54,930	-4.89%	120.45	114.56
37	Toyama-ken	Toyama-shi	4,247.58	1,066,883	1,034,814	-32,069	-3.01%	251.17	243.62
38	Akita-ken	Akita-shi	11,637.52	1,022,839	959,502	-63,337	-6.19%	87.89	82.45
39	Kagawa-ken	Takamatsu-shi	1,876.78	976,756	950,244	-26,512	-2.71%	520.44	506.32
40	Wakayama-ken	Wakayama-shi	4,724.65	963,850	922,584	-41,266	-4.28%	204.00	195.27
41	Yamanashi-ken	Kōfu-shi	2,440.69	835,165	809,974	-25,191	-3.02%	341.40	332.46
42	Saga-ken	Saga-shi	4,465.27	833,245	811,442	-21,803	-2.62%	187.04	181.39
43	Fukui-ken	Fukui-shi	4,190.52	787,099	766,863	-20,236	-2.57%	187.83	183.00
44	Tokushima-ken	Tokushima-shi	4,146.75	756,063	719,559	-36,504	-4.83%	182.33	173.52
45	Kōchi-ken	Kōchi-shi	7,103.63	728,461	691,527	-36,934	-5.07%	102.55	97.35
46	Shimane-ken	Matsue-shi	6,707.89	694,188	671,126	-23,062	-3.32%	103.49	100.05
47	Tottori-ken	Tottori-shi	3,507.14	573,648	553,407	-20,241	-3.53%	163.57	157.79
	Japan	Tōkyō-to	377,981.12	127,110,047	126,146,099	-963,948	-0.76%	336.29	333.74

== Prefectures of Japan ranked by population as of October 1, 2015 ==
Rank	Prefecture	Japanese	Capital	Est. Area (km^{2})	Census Population Oct 1, 2010	Latest Census Population Oct 1, 2015	Population Change 2010–2015	% Change	2010 Population Density (/km^{2})	2015 Population Density (/km^{2})
1	Tōkyō-to	東京都	Shinjuku-ku	2,188.67	13,159,388	13,513,734	354,346	2.7%	6,029.22	6,174.40
2	Kanagawa-ken	神奈川県	Yokohama-shi	2,415.86	9,048,331	9,127,323	78,992	0.9%	3,749.43	3,778.08
3	Ōsaka-fu	大阪府	Ōsaka-shi	1,899.28	8,865,245	8,838,908	-26,337	-0.3%	4,665.46	4,653.82
4	Aichi-ken	愛知県	Nagoya-shi	5,165.12	7,410,719	7,484,094	73,375	1.0%	1,435.85	1,448.97
5	Saitama-ken	埼玉県	Saitama-shi	3,798.08	7,194,556	7,261,271	66,715	0.9%	1,897.57	1,911.83
6	Chiba-ken	千葉県	Chiba-shi	5,156.61	6,216,289	6,224,027	7,738	0.1%	1,205.08	1,207.00
7	Hyōgo-ken	兵庫県	Kōbe-shi	8,396.16	5,588,133	5,536,989	-51,144	-0.9%	664.82	659.47
8	Hokkaido	北海道	Sapporo-shi	83,457.00	5,506,419	5,383,579	-122,840	-2.2%	65.73	64.51
9	Fukuoka-ken	福岡県	Fukuoka-shi	4,978.51	5,071,968	5,102,871	30,903	0.6%	1,020.24	1,024.98
10	Shizuoka-ken	静岡県	Shizuoka-shi	7,780.50	3,765,007	3,701,181	-63,826	-1.7%	481.88	475.70
11	Ibaraki-ken	茨城県	Mito-shi	6,095.72	2,969,770	2,917,857	-51,913	-1.7%	485.21	478.67
12	Hiroshima-ken	広島県	Hiroshima-shi	8,479.70	2,860,750	2,844,963	-15,787	-0.6%	336.69	335.50
13	Kyōto-fu	京都府	Kyōto-shi	4,613.21	2,636,092	2,610,140	-25,952	-1.0%	570.46	565.80
14	Miyagi-ken	宮城県	Sendai-shi	7,285.77	2,348,165	2,334,215	-13,950	-0.6%	319.35	320.38
15	Niigata-ken	新潟県	Niigata-shi	12,583.83	2,374,450	2,305,098	-69,352	-2.9%	187.71	183.18
16	Nagano-ken	長野県	Nagano-shi	13,562.23	2,152,449	2,099,759	-52,690	-2.4%	157.95	154.82
17	Gifu-ken	岐阜県	Gifu-shi	10,621.17	2,080,773	2,032,533	-48,240	-2.3%	194.98	191.37
18	Tochigi-ken	栃木県	Utsunomiya-shi	6,408.28	2,007,683	1,974,671	-33,012	-1.6%	312.1	308.14
19	Gunma-ken	群馬県	Maebashi-shi	6,362.33	2,008,068	1,973,476	-34,592	-1.7%	314.43	310.18
20	Okayama-ken	岡山県	Okayama-shi	7,113.23	1,945,276	1,922,181	-23,095	-1.2%	272.81	270.23
21	Fukushima-ken	福島県	Fukushima-shi	13,782.76	2,029,064	1,913,606	-115,458	-5.7%	144.37	138.84
22	Mie-ken	三重県	Tsu-shi	5,777.31	1,854,724	1,815,827	-38,897	-2.1%	319.74	314.30
23	Kumamoto-ken	熊本県	Kumamoto-shi	7,404.79	1,817,426	1,786,969	-30,457	-1.7%	244.78	241.33
24	Kagoshima-ken	鹿児島県	Kagoshima-shi	9,188.82	1,706,242	1,648,752	-57,490	-3.4%	184.87	179.43
25	Yamaguchi-ken	山口県	Yamaguchi-shi	6,114.09	1,451,338	1,405,007	-46,331	-3.2%	235.92	229.80
26	Ehime-ken	愛媛県	Matsuyama-shi	5,678.33	1,431,493	1,385,840	-45,653	-3.2%	250.67	244.06
27	Nagasaki-ken	長崎県	Nagasaki-shi	4,105.47	1,426,779	1,377,780	-48,999	-3.4%	345.25	335.60
28	Okinawa-ken	沖縄県	Naha-shi	2,276.49	1,392,818	1,434,138	41,320	3.0%	615.45	629.98
29	Shiga-ken	滋賀県	Ōtsu-shi	4,017.36	1,410,777	1,413,184	2,407	0.2%	351.85	351.77
30	Nara-ken	奈良県	Nara-shi	3,691.09	1,400,728	1,365,008	-35,720	-2.6%	378.17	369.81
31	Aomori-ken	青森県	Aomori-shi	9,644.55	1,373,339	1,308,649	-64,690	-4.7%	141.3	135.69
32	Iwate-ken	岩手県	Morioka-shi	15,278.89	1,330,147	1,279,814	-50,333	-3.8%	86.01	83.76
33	Ōita-ken	大分県	Ōita-shi	6,339.74	1,196,529	1,166,729	-29,800	-2.5%	187.93	184.03
34	Ishikawa-ken	石川県	Kanazawa-shi	4,185.67	1,169,788	1,154,343	-15,445	-1.3%	278.64	275.78
35	Yamagata-ken	山形県	Yamagata-shi	9,323.46	1,168,924	1,122,957	-45,967	-3.9%	124.55	120.44
36	Miyazaki-ken	宮崎県	Miyazaki-shi	7,735.99	1,135,233	1,104,377	-30,856	-2.7%	146.2	142.76
37	Toyama-ken	富山県	Toyama-shi	4,247.61	1,093,247	1,066,883	-26,364	-2.4%	256.08	251.17
38	Akita-ken	秋田県	Akita-shi	11,636.28	1,085,997	1,022,839	-63,158	-5.8%	92.37	87.90
39	Kagawa-ken	香川県	Takamatsu-shi	1,876.55	995,842	976,756	-19,086	-1.9%	528.6	520.51
40	Wakayama-ken	和歌山県	Wakayama-shi	4,726.29	1,002,198	963,850	-38,348	-3.8%	210.53	203.93
41	Yamanashi-ken	山梨県	Kōfu-shi	4,465.37	863,075	835,165	-27,910	-3.2%	192.02	187.03
42	Saga-ken	佐賀県	Saga-shi	2,439.65	849,788	833,245	-16,543	-1.9%	347.09	341.54
43	Fukui-ken	福井県	Fukui-shi	4,189.88	806,314	787,099	-19,215	-2.4%	191.63	187.86
44	Tokushima-ken	徳島県	Tokushima-shi	4,146.74	785,491	756,063	-29,428	-3.7%	188.16	182.33
45	Kōchi-ken	高知県	Kōchi-shi	7,105.16	764,456	728,461	-35,995	-4.7%	106.75	102.53
46	Shimane-ken	島根県	Matsue-shi	6,707.96	717,397	694,188	-23,209	-3.2%	106.19	103.49
47	Tottori-ken	鳥取県	Tottori-shi	3,507.28	588,667	573,648	-15,019	-2.6%	166.94	163.56
	Japan	日本国	Tōkyō-to	377,954.84	128,057,352	127,110,047	-947,305	-0.7%	338.13	336.31

== Prefectures of Japan ranked by population as of October 1, 2011 ==
Figures here are according to the official estimates of Japan as of October 1, 2011, except for the census population held on October 1, 2010. Population is given according to the de jure population concept for enumerating the people. That is, a person was enumerated at the place where they usually lived, and was counted as the population of the area including the place. Ranks are given by the estimated population as of October 1, 2011.

Rank	Prefecture	Japanese	Capital	Est. Area (km^{2})	Est. Total Population	Est. Male Population	Est. Female Population	Annual Change (Oct 1, 2010 to Sep 30, 2011)	Est. Population of Japanese Nationality
1	Tōkyō-to	東京都	Shinjuku-ku	2,188.67	13,195,974	6,523,551	6,672,423	36,586	12,869,205
2	Kanagawa-ken	神奈川県	Yokohama-shi	2,415.86	9,058,094	4,543,383	4,514,711	9,763	8,934,423
3	Ōsaka-fu	大阪府	Ōsaka-shi	1,899.28	8,861,012	4,279,771	4,581,241	-4,233	8,698,609
4	Aichi-ken	愛知県	Nagoya-shi	5,165.12	7,416,336	3,705,395	3,710,941	5,617	7,261,898
5	Saitama-ken	埼玉県	Saitama-shi	3,798.08	7,207,139	3,612,453	3,594,686	12,583	7,117,493
6	Chiba-ken	千葉県	Chiba-shi	5,156.61	6,214,148	3,095,664	3,118,484	-2,141	6,134,596
7	Hyōgo-ken	兵庫県	Kōbe-shi	8,396.16	5,581,968	2,669,033	2,912,935	-6,165	5,504,516
8	Hokkaido	北海道	Sapporo-shi	83,457.00	5,485,952	2,591,405	2,894,547	-20,467	5,467,326
9	Fukuoka-ken	福岡県	Fukuoka-shi	4,978.51	5,079,291	2,397,299	2,681,992	7,323	5,038,034
10	Shizuoka-ken	静岡県	Shizuoka-shi	7,780.50	3,749,274	1,846,407	1,902,867	-15,733	3,694,014
11	Ibaraki-ken	茨城県	Mito-shi	6,095.72	2,957,706	1,474,297	1,483,409	-12,064	2,918,842
12	Hiroshima-ken	広島県	Hiroshima-shi	8,479.70	2,855,045	1,377,843	1,477,202	-5,705	2,823,615
13	Kyōto-fu	京都府	Kyōto-shi	4,613.21	2,631,671	1,262,660	1,369,011	-4,421	2,589,740
14	Niigata-ken	新潟県	Niigata-shi	12,583.83	2,362,158	1,142,365	1,219,793	-12,292	2,350,786
15	Miyagi-ken	宮城県	Sendai-shi	7,285.77	2,326,735	1,129,926	1,196,809	-21,430	2,314,761
16	Nagano-ken	長野県	Nagano-shi	13,562.23	2,142,167	1,041,409	1,100,758	-10,282	2,115,329
17	Gifu-ken	岐阜県	Gifu-shi	10,621.17	2,070,908	1,002,276	1,068,632	-9,865	2,037,356
18	Gunma-ken	群馬県	Maebashi-shi	6,362.33	2,000,514	984,456	1,016,058	-7,554	1,966,343
19	Tochigi-ken	栃木県	Utsunomiya-shi	6,408.28	2,000,010	993,515	1,006,495	-7,673	1,974,639
20	Fukushima-ken	福島県	Fukushima-shi	13,782.76	1,989,834	967,024	1,022,810	-39,230	1,981,379
21	Okayama-ken	岡山県	Okayama-shi	7,113.23	1,940,559	930,802	1,009,757	-4,717	1,922,457
22	Mie-ken	三重県	Tsu-shi	5,777.31	1,847,223	899,880	947,343	-7,501	1,816,423
23	Kumamoto-ken	熊本県	Kumamoto-shi	7,404.79	1,812,575	851,512	961,063	-4,851	1,805,009
24	Kagoshima-ken	鹿児島県	Kagoshima-shi	9,188.82	1,698,695	793,523	905,172	-7,547	1,692,899
25	Yamaguchi-ken	山口県	Yamaguchi-shi	6,114.09	1,442,428	680,028	762,400	-8,910	1,430,683
26	Ehime-ken	愛媛県	Matsuyama-shi	5,678.33	1,423,406	669,671	753,735	-8,087	1,416,061
27	Nagasaki-ken	長崎県	Nagasaki-shi	4,105.47	1,417,423	661,501	755,922	-9,356	1,411,261
28	Shiga-ken	滋賀県	Ōtsu-shi	4,017.36	1,413,513	698,387	715,126	2,736	1,393,683
29	Okinawa-ken	沖縄県	Naha-shi	2,276.49	1,401,066	687,245	713,821	8,248	1,393,451
30	Nara-ken	奈良県	Nara-shi	3,691.09	1,395,845	660,457	735,388	-4,883	1,386,694
31	Aomori-ken	青森県	Aomori-shi	9,644.55	1,362,820	640,699	722,121	-10,519	1,359,540
32	Iwate-ken	岩手県	Morioka-shi	15,278.89	1,314,076	627,232	686,844	-16,071	1,309,060
33	Ōita-ken	大分県	Ōita-shi	6,339.74	1,191,430	562,753	628,677	-5,099	1,182,985
34	Ishikawa-ken	石川県	Kanazawa-shi	4,185.67	1,166,309	563,490	602,819	-3,479	1,156,771
35	Yamagata-ken	山形県	Yamagata-shi	9,323.46	1,161,214	557,200	604,014	-7,710	1,155,565
36	Miyazaki-ken	宮崎県	Miyazaki-shi	7,735.99	1,130,983	531,007	599,976	-4,250	1,127,069
37	Toyama-ken	富山県	Toyama-shi	4,247.61	1,087,745	524,274	563,471	-5,502	1,077,203
38	Akita-ken	秋田県	Akita-shi	11,636.28	1,074,858	504,513	570,345	-11,139	1,071,848
39	Wakayama-ken	和歌山県	Wakayama-shi	4,726.29	995,010	467,776	527,234	-7,188	990,288
40	Kagawa-ken	香川県	Takamatsu-shi	1,876.55	991,947	478,232	513,715	-3,895	985,272
41	Yamanashi-ken	山梨県	Kōfu-shi	4,465.37	857,459	419,666	437,793	-5,616	845,769
42	Saga-ken	佐賀県	Saga-shi	2,439.65	846,787	398,758	448,029	-3,001	843,185
43	Fukui-ken	福井県	Fukui-shi	4,189.88	802,906	388,396	414,510	-3,408	792,667
44	Tokushima-ken	徳島県	Tokushima-shi	4,146.74	780,236	370,323	409,913	-5,255	776,346
45	Kōchi-ken	高知県	Kōchi-shi	7,105.16	758,469	356,257	402,212	-5,987	755,431
46	Shimane-ken	島根県	Matsue-shi	6,707.96	712,292	340,649	371,643	-5,105	707,588
47	Tottori-ken	鳥取県	Tottori-shi	3,507.28	585,494	279,362	306,132	-3,173	582,023
	Japan	日本国	Tōkyō-to	377,954.84	127,798,704	62,183,725	65,614,979	-258,648	126,180,135

== Historical demography of prefectures of Japan ==
Population before 1920 was calculated based on information of family registries (戸籍, koseki), while door-to-door censuses have been held every 5 years as of October 1 since 1920, except for 1945.

As for prefectural populations before 1945, figures are only given for prefectures that officially constituted Japan Proper or Mainland Japan (内地, naichi; inner lands). Karafuto Prefecture (樺太府, Karafuto-fu) (Southern Sakhalin) was officially incorporated into Japan Proper from March 26, 1943 until the end of the World War II, while Taiwan, the Kwantung Leased Territory, Korea and the South Seas Mandate were treated as exterior territories (外地, gaichi; outer lands). At the end of war, Japan lost sovereignty over Southern Sakhalin and the Kuril Islands (part of Hokkaidō, which Japan partly disputes). For the population of the colonies of the former Empire of Japan, see Demographics of Imperial Japan.

=== 1948 to 2020 ===
Population in the following table is given according to the de jure population concept for enumerating the people.

- Source: Census of Japan (as of October 1 for the years of 2020, 2015, 2010, 2005, 2000, 1995, 1990, 1985, 1980, 1975, 1970, 1965, 1960, 1955 and 1950),

De jure Population Census of Japan (as of August 1, 1948),
Census of Ryūkyū (as of October 1, 1970, December 1, 1960 and December 1, 1950),
Extraordinary Census of Ryūkyū (as of October 1, 1965 and December 1, 1955).

Prefectures	Oct 1, 2020	Oct 1, 2015	Oct 1, 2010	Oct 1, 2005	Oct 1, 2000	Oct 1, 1995	Oct 1, 1990	Oct 1, 1985	Oct 1, 1980
Hokkaidō	5,224,614	5,381,733	5,506,419	5,627,737	5,683,062	5,692,321	5,643,647	5,679,439	5,575,989
Aomori-ken	1,237,984	1,308,265	1,373,339	1,436,657	1,475,728	1,481,663	1,482,873	1,524,448	1,523,907
Iwate-ken	1,210,534	1,279,594	1,330,147	1,385,041	1,416,180	1,419,505	1,416,928	1,433,611	1,421,927
Miyagi-ken	2,301,996	2,333,899	2,348,165	2,360,218	2,365,320	2,328,739	2,248,558	2,176,295	2,082,320
Akita-ken	959,502	1,023,119	1,085,997	1,145,501	1,189,279	1,213,667	1,227,478	1,254,032	1,256,745
Yamagata-ken	1,068,027	1,123,891	1,168,924	1,216,181	1,244,147	1,256,958	1,258,390	1,261,662	1,251,917
Fukushima-ken	1,833,152	1,914,039	2,029,064	2,091,319	2,126,935	2,133,592	2,104,058	2,080,304	2,035,272
Ibaraki-ken	2,867,009	2,916,976	2,969,770	2,975,167	2,985,676	2,955,530	2,845,382	2,725,005	2,558,007
Tochigi-ken	1,933,146	1,974,255	2,007,683	2,016,631	2,004,817	1,984,390	1,935,168	1,866,066	1,792,201
Gunma-ken	1,939,110	1,973,115	2,008,068	2,024,135	2,024,852	2,003,540	1,966,265	1,921,259	1,848,562
Saitama-ken	7,344,765	7,266,534	7,194,556	7,054,243	6,938,006	6,759,311	6,405,319	5,863,678	5,420,480
Chiba-ken	6,284,480	6,222,666	6,216,289	6,056,462	5,926,285	5,797,782	5,555,429	5,148,163	4,735,424
Tōkyō-to	14,047,594	13,515,271	13,159,388	12,576,601	12,064,101	11,773,605	11,855,563	11,829,363	11,618,281
Kanagawa-ken	9,237,337	9,126,214	9,048,331	8,791,597	8,489,974	8,245,900	7,980,391	7,431,974	6,924,348
Niigata-ken	2,201,272	2,304,264	2,374,450	2,431,459	2,475,733	2,488,364	2,474,583	2,478,470	2,451,357
Toyama-ken	1,034,814	1,066,328	1,093,247	1,111,729	1,120,851	1,123,125	1,120,161	1,118,369	1,103,459
Ishikawa-ken	1,132,526	1,154,008	1,169,788	1,174,026	1,180,977	1,180,068	1,164,628	1,152,325	1,119,304
Fukui-ken	766,863	786,740	806,314	821,592	828,944	826,996	823,585	817,633	794,354
Yamanashi-ken	809,974	834,930	863,075	884,515	888,172	881,996	852,966	832,832	804,256
Nagano-ken	2,048,011	2,098,804	2,152,449	2,196,114	2,215,168	2,193,984	2,156,627	2,136,927	2,083,934
Gifu-ken	1,978,742	2,031,903	2,080,773	2,107,226	2,107,700	2,100,315	2,066,569	2,028,536	1,960,107
Shizuoka-ken	3,633,202	3,700,305	3,765,007	3,792,377	3,767,393	3,737,689	3,670,840	3,574,692	3,446,804
Aichi-ken	7,542,415	7,483,128	7,410,719	7,254,704	7,043,300	6,868,336	6,690,603	6,455,172	6,221,638
Mie-ken	1,770,254	1,815,865	1,854,724	1,866,963	1,857,339	1,841,358	1,792,514	1,747,311	1,686,936
Shiga-ken	1,413,610	1,412,916	1,410,777	1,380,361	1,342,832	1,287,005	1,222,411	1,155,844	1,079,898
Kyōto-fu	2,578,087	2,610,353	2,636,092	2,647,660	2,644,391	2,629,592	2,602,460	2,586,574	2,527,330
Ōsaka-fu	8,837,685	8,839,469	8,865,245	8,817,166	8,805,081	8,797,268	8,734,516	8,668,095	8,473,446
Hyōgo-ken	5,465,002	5,534,800	5,588,133	5,590,601	5,550,574	5,401,877	5,405,040	5,278,050	5,144,892
Nara-ken	1,324,473	1,364,316	1,400,728	1,421,310	1,442,795	1,430,862	1,375,481	1,304,866	1,209,365
Wakayama-ken	922,584	963,579	1,002,198	1,035,969	1,069,912	1,080,435	1,074,325	1,087,206	1,087,012
Tottori-ken	553,407	573,441	588,667	607,012	613,289	614,929	615,722	616,024	604,221
Shimane-ken	671,126	694,352	717,397	742,223	761,503	771,441	781,021	794,629	784,795
Okayama-ken	1,888,432	1,921,525	1,945,276	1,957,264	1,950,828	1,950,750	1,925,877	1,916,906	1,871,023
Hiroshima-ken	2,799,702	2,843,990	2,860,750	2,876,642	2,878,915	2,881,748	2,849,847	2,819,200	2,739,161
Yamaguchi-ken	1,342,059	1,404,729	1,451,338	1,492,606	1,527,964	1,555,543	1,572,616	1,601,627	1,587,079
Tokushima-ken	719,559	755,733	785,491	809,950	824,108	832,427	831,598	834,889	825,261
Kagawa-ken	950,244	976,263	995,842	1,012,400	1,022,890	1,027,006	1,023,412	1,022,569	999,864
Ehime-ken	1,334,841	1,385,262	1,431,493	1,467,815	1,493,092	1,506,700	1,515,025	1,529,983	1,506,637
Kōchi-ken	691,527	728,276	764,456	796,292	813,949	816,704	825,034	839,784	831,275
Fukuoka-ken	5,135,214	5,101,556	5,071,968	5,049,908	5,015,699	4,933,393	4,811,050	4,719,259	4,553,461
Saga-ken	811,442	832,832	849,788	866,369	876,654	884,316	877,851	880,013	865,574
Nagasaki-ken	1,312,317	1,377,187	1,426,779	1,478,632	1,516,523	1,544,934	1,562,959	1,593,968	1,590,564
Kumamoto-ken	1,738,301	1,786,170	1,817,426	1,842,233	1,859,344	1,859,793	1,840,326	1,837,747	1,790,327
Ōita-ken	1,123,852	1,166,338	1,196,529	1,209,571	1,221,140	1,231,306	1,236,942	1,250,214	1,228,913
Miyazaki-ken	1,069,576	1,104,069	1,135,233	1,153,042	1,170,007	1,175,819	1,168,907	1,175,543	1,151,587
Kagoshima-ken	1,588,256	1,648,177	1,706,242	1,753,179	1,786,194	1,794,224	1,797,824	1,819,270	1,784,623
Okinawa-ken	1,467,480	1,433,566	1,392,818	1,361,594	1,318,220	1,273,440	1,222,398	1,179,097	1,106,559
Japan - Total	126,146,099	127,094,745	128,057,352	127,767,994	126,925,843	125,570,246	123,611,167	121,048,923	117,060,396

Prefectures	Oct 1, 1975	Oct 1, 1970	Oct 1, 1965	Oct 1, 1960	Oct 1, 1955	Oct 1, 1950	Aug 1, 1948
Hokkaidō	5,338,206	5,184,287	5,171,800	5,039,206	4,773,087	4,295,567	4,021,050
Aomori-ken	1,468,646	1,427,520	1,416,591	1,426,606	1,382,523	1,282,867	1,218,325
Iwate-ken	1,385,563	1,371,383	1,411,118	1,448,517	1,427,097	1,346,728	1,294,203
Miyagi-ken	1,955,267	1,819,223	1,753,126	1,743,195	1,727,065	1,663,442	1,596,307
Akita-ken	1,232,481	1,241,376	1,279,835	1,335,580	1,348,871	1,309,031	1,283,710
Yamagata-ken	1,220,302	1,225,618	1,263,103	1,320,664	1,353,649	1,357,347	1,346,492
Fukushima-ken	1,970,616	1,946,077	1,983,754	2,051,137	2,095,237	2,062,394	2,026,482
Ibaraki-ken	2,342,198	2,143,551	2,056,154	2,047,024	2,064,037	2,039,418	2,044,578
Tochigi-ken	1,698,003	1,580,021	1,521,656	1,513,624	1,547,580	1,550,462	1,557,860
Gunma-ken	1,756,480	1,658,909	1,605,584	1,578,476	1,613,549	1,601,380	1,608,894
Saitama-ken	4,821,340	3,866,472	3,014,983	2,430,871	2,262,623	2,146,445	2,132,221
Chiba-ken	4,149,147	3,366,624	2,701,770	2,306,010	2,205,060	2,139,037	2,140,511
Tōkyō-to	11,673,554	11,408,071	10,869,244	9,683,802	8,037,084	6,277,500	5,417,871
Kanagawa-ken	6,397,748	5,472,247	4,430,743	3,443,176	2,919,497	2,487,665	2,317,551
Niigata-ken	2,391,938	2,360,982	2,398,931	2,442,037	2,473,492	2,460,997	2,435,451
Toyama-ken	1,070,791	1,029,695	1,025,465	1,032,614	1,021,121	1,008,790	998,349
Ishikawa-ken	1,069,872	1,002,420	980,499	973,418	966,187	957,279	941,772
Fukui-ken	773,599	744,230	750,557	752,696	754,055	752,374	733,374
Yamanashi-ken	783,050	762,029	763,194	782,062	807,044	811,369	815,485
Nagano-ken	2,017,564	1,956,917	1,958,007	1,981,433	2,021,292	2,060,831	2,079,682
Gifu-ken	1,867,978	1,758,954	1,700,365	1,638,399	1,583,605	1,544,538	1,524,812
Shizuoka-ken	3,308,799	3,089,895	2,912,521	2,756,271	2,650,435	2,471,472	2,407,102
Aichi-ken	5,923,569	5,386,163	4,798,653	4,206,313	3,769,209	3,390,585	3,226,116
Mie-ken	1,626,002	1,543,083	1,514,467	1,485,054	1,485,582	1,461,197	1,451,100
Shiga-ken	985,621	889,768	853,385	842,695	853,734	861,180	872,775
Kyōto-fu	2,424,856	2,250,087	2,102,808	1,993,403	1,935,161	1,832,934	1,784,753
Ōsaka-fu	8,278,925	7,620,480	6,657,189	5,504,746	4,618,308	3,857,047	3,515,225
Hyōgo-ken	4,992,140	4,667,928	4,309,944	3,906,487	3,620,947	3,309,935	3,156,888
Nara-ken	1,077,491	930,160	825,965	781,058	776,861	763,883	778,677
Wakayama-ken	1,072,118	1,042,736	1,026,975	1,002,191	1,006,819	982,113	979,982
Tottori-ken	581,311	568,777	579,853	599,135	614,259	600,177	592,863
Shimane-ken	768,886	773,575	821,620	888,886	929,066	912,551	903,576
Okayama-ken	1,814,305	1,707,026	1,645,135	1,670,454	1,689,800	1,661,099	1,650,285
Hiroshima-ken	2,646,324	2,436,135	2,281,146	2,184,043	2,149,044	2,081,967	2,045,923
Yamaguchi-ken	1,555,218	1,511,448	1,543,573	1,602,207	1,609,839	1,540,882	1,505,532
Tokushima-ken	805,166	791,111	815,115	847,274	878,109	878,511	869,290
Kagawa-ken	961,292	907,897	900,845	918,867	943,823	946,022	934,123
Ehime-ken	1,465,215	1,418,124	1,446,384	1,500,687	1,540,628	1,521,878	1,481,106
Kōchi-ken	808,397	786,882	812,714	854,595	882,683	873,874	866,385
Fukuoka-ken	4,292,963	4,027,416	3,964,611	4,006,679	3,859,764	3,530,169	3,312,577
Saga-ken	837,674	838,468	871,885	942,874	973,749	945,082	931,336
Nagasaki-ken	1,571,912	1,570,245	1,641,245	1,760,421	1,747,596	1,645,492	1,565,558
Kumamoto-ken	1,715,273	1,700,229	1,770,736	1,856,192	1,895,663	1,827,582	1,786,058
Ōita-ken	1,190,314	1,155,566	1,187,480	1,239,655	1,277,199	1,252,999	1,245,689
Miyazaki-ken	1,085,055	1,051,105	1,080,692	1,134,590	1,139,384	1,091,427	1,052,483
Kagoshima-ken	1,723,902	1,729,150	1,853,541	1,963,104	2,044,112	1,804,118	1,766,514
Okinawa-ken	1,042,572						
Japan	111,939,643	103,720,060	98,274,961	93,418,501	89,275,529	83,199,637	80,216,896
Ryūkyū		945,111	934,176	883,122	801,065	917,875	n.a.
Total	111,939,643	104,665,171	99,209,137	94,301,623	90,076,594	84,117,512	80,216,896

=== 1920 to 1947 ===
Population in the following table is given according to the de facto population concept for enumerating the people.

- Source: Extraordinary Census of Japan (as of October 1, 1947),

Population Census of Japan (as of April 26, 1946, November 1, 1945 and February 22, 1944),
Census of Japan (as of October 1 for the years of 1940, 1935, 1930, 1925 and 1920).

Prefectures	Oct 1, 1947	Apr 26, 1946	Nov 1, 1945	Feb 22, 1944	Oct 1, 1940	Oct 1, 1935	Oct 1, 1930	Oct 1, 1925	Oct 1, 1920
Hokkaidō	3,852,821	3,488,013	3,518,389	3,273,853	3,272,718	3,068,282	2,812,335	2,498,679	2,359,183
Aomori-ken	1,180,245	1,089,232	1,083,250	1,009,104	1,000,509	967,129	879,914	812,977	756,454
Iwate-ken	1,262,743	1,217,154	1,227,789	1,104,049	1,095,793	1,046,111	975,771	900,984	845,540
Miyagi-ken	1,566,831	1,462,100	1,462,254	1,275,862	1,271,238	1,234,801	1,142,784	1,044,036	961,768
Akita-ken	1,257,398	1,195,813	1,211,871	1,048,769	1,052,275	1,037,744	987,706	936,408	898,537
Yamagata-ken	1,335,653	1,294,934	1,326,350	1,083,569	1,119,338	1,116,822	1,080,034	1,027,297	968,925
Fukushima-ken	1,992,460	1,918,746	1,957,356	1,599,392	1,625,521	1,581,563	1,508,150	1,437,596	1,362,750
Ibaraki-ken	2,013,735	1,940,833	1,944,344	1,656,678	1,620,000	1,548,991	1,487,097	1,409,092	1,350,400
Tochigi-ken	1,534,311	1,503,619	1,546,355	1,203,679	1,206,657	1,195,057	1,141,737	1,090,428	1,046,479
Gunma-ken	1,572,787	1,524,635	1,546,081	1,319,517	1,299,027	1,242,453	1,186,080	1,118,858	1,052,610
Saitama-ken	2,100,453	2,028,553	2,047,261	1,647,625	1,608,039	1,528,854	1,459,172	1,394,461	1,319,533
Chiba-ken	2,112,917	2,008,568	1,966,862	1,659,345	1,588,425	1,546,394	1,470,121	1,399,257	1,336,155
Tōkyō-to	5,000,777	4,183,072	3,488,284	7,279,256					
Tōkyō-fu					7,354,971	6,369,919	5,408,678	4,485,144	3,699,428
Kanagawa-ken	2,218,120	2,019,943	1,865,667	2,474,354	2,188,974	1,840,005	1,619,606	1,416,792	1,323,390
Niigata-ken	2,418,271	2,326,811	2,389,653	1,994,817	2,064,402	1,995,777	1,933,326	1,849,807	1,776,474
Toyama-ken	979,229	932,669	953,834	819,614	822,569	798,890	778,953	749,243	724,276
Ishikawa-ken	927,743	877,197	887,510	743,672	757,676	768,416	756,835	750,854	747,360
Fukui-ken	726,264	695,703	724,856	621,933	643,904	646,659	618,144	597,899	599,155
Yamanashi-ken	807,251	796,973	839,057	634,897	663,026	646,727	631,042	600,675	583,453
Nagano-ken	2,060,010	2,028,648	2,121,050	1,650,511	1,710,729	1,714,000	1,717,118	1,629,217	1,562,722
Gifu-ken	1,493,644	1,444,000	1,518,649	1,266,008	1,265,024	1,225,799	1,178,405	1,132,557	1,070,407
Shizuoka-ken	2,353,005	2,260,059	2,220,358	2,027,856	2,017,860	1,939,860	1,797,805	1,671,217	1,550,387
Aichi-ken	3,122,902	2,919,085	2,857,851	3,280,206	3,166,592	2,862,701	2,567,413	2,319,494	2,089,762
Mie-ken	1,416,494	1,371,858	1,394,286	1,209,266	1,198,783	1,174,595	1,157,407	1,107,692	1,069,270
Shiga-ken	858,367	831,306	860,911	691,972	703,679	711,436	691,631	662,412	651,050
Kyōto-fu	1,739,084	1,621,998	1,603,796	1,635,528	1,729,993	1,702,508	1,552,832	1,406,382	1,287,147
Ōsaka-fu	3,334,659	2,976,140	2,800,958	4,412,953	4,792,966	4,297,174	3,540,017	3,059,502	2,587,847
Hyōgo-ken	3,057,444	2,826,192	2,821,892	3,224,376	3,221,232	2,923,249	2,646,301	2,454,679	2,301,799
Nara-ken	779,935	744,381	779,685	606,789	620,509	620,471	596,225	583,828	564,607
Wakayama-ken	959,999	933,231	936,006	847,388	865,074	864,087	830,748	787,511	750,411
Tottori-ken	587,606	557,429	563,220	476,284	484,390	490,461	489,266	472,230	454,675
Shimane-ken	894,267	848,995	860,275	729,819	740,940	747,119	739,507	722,402	714,712
Okayama-ken	1,619,622	1,538,621	1,564,626	1,333,300	1,329,358	1,332,647	1,283,962	1,238,447	1,217,698
Hiroshima-ken	2,011,498	1,901,430	1,885,471	1,962,950	1,869,504	1,804,916	1,692,136	1,617,680	1,541,905
Yamaguchi-ken	1,479,244	1,375,496	1,356,491	1,357,368	1,294,242	1,190,542	1,135,637	1,094,544	1,041,013
Tokushima-ken	854,811	829,405	835,763	703,260	718,717	728,748	716,544	689,814	670,212
Kagawa-ken	917,673	872,312	863,700	713,134	730,394	748,656	732,816	700,308	677,852
Ehime-ken	1,453,887	1,380,700	1,361,484	1,186,491	1,178,705	1,164,898	1,142,122	1,096,366	1,046,720
Kōchi-ken	848,337	797,876	775,578	693,053	709,286	714,980	718,152	687,478	670,895
Fukuoka-ken	3,178,134	2,906,644	2,746,855	3,066,472	3,094,132	2,755,804	2,527,119	2,301,668	2,188,249
Saga-ken	917,797	856,692	830,431	705,651	701,517	686,117	691,565	684,831	673,895
Nagasaki-ken	1,531,674	1,417,977	1,318,589	1,490,890	1,370,063	1,296,883	1,233,362	1,163,945	1,136,182
Kumamoto-ken	1,765,726	1,631,976	1,556,490	1,371,005	1,368,179	1,387,054	1,353,993	1,296,086	1,233,233
Ōita-ken	1,233,651	1,149,501	1,124,513	973,707	972,975	980,458	945,771	915,136	860,282
Miyazaki-ken	1,025,689	957,856	913,687	839,556	840,357	824,431	760,467	691,094	651,097
Kagoshima-ken	1,746,305	1,629,760	1,538,466	1,594,009	1,589,467	1,591,466	1,556,690	1,472,193	1,415,582
Okinawa-ken				590,480	574,579	592,494	577,509	557,622	571,572
Karafuto-fu				391,825					
Japan Proper	78,101,473	73,114,136	71,998,104	73,482,092	73,114,308	69,254,148	64,450,005	59,736,822	55,963,053

=== 1884 to 1918 ===
Population in the following tables is given according to the A-type de facto population concept for enumerating the people, based on koseki registration systems.

- Source: Imperial Japan Static Population Statistics (as of December 31 for the years of 1918, 1913, 1908 and 1903),

Imperial Japan Population Statistics (as of December 31, 1898),
Imperial Japan Registered Household Tables (as of December 31 for the years of 1897, 1896, 1895, 1894, 1893, 1892, 1891, 1890, 1889, 1888, 1887 and 1886),
Japan Registered Household Tables (as of January 1, 1886),
Japan Household Tables (as of January 1 for the years of 1885 and 1884).

Prefectures	Dec 31, 1918	Dec 31, 1913	Dec 31, 1908	Dec 31, 1903	Dec 31, 1898	Dec 31, 1897	Dec 31, 1896	Dec 31, 1895	Dec 31, 1894	Dec 31, 1893
Hokkaidō	2,177,700	1,817,705	1,459,424	1,089,503	859,534	755,837	698,144	647,883	594,143	537,953
Aomori-ken	797,841	764,485	721,127	665,691	617,531	600,294	589,557	584,459	574,235	567,002
Iwate-ken	869,652	835,415	776,714	748,752	718,737	702,750	694,867	702,915	693,730	690,456
Miyagi-ken	954,571	927,337	893,365	905,883	851,210	833,113	821,257	817,805	802,927	790,079
Akita-ken	977,212	943,628	892,650	837,665	781,129	757,041	748,358	737,922	726,974	720,871
Yamagata-ken	987,053	965,356	913,445	879,564	827,138	811,039	800,831	790,779	781,727	778,280
Fukushima-ken	1,389,609	1,303,501	1,234,281	1,175,224	1,098,002	1,061,013	1,041,294	1,022,780	1,005,381	994,825
Ibaraki-ken	1,407,735	1,328,329	1,259,995	1,200,475	1,149,594	1,115,269	1,101,540	1,085,445	1,069,316	1,058,369
Tochigi-ken	1,103,333	1,044,177	977,437	912,274	829,630	798,946	781,864	767,478	751,874	744,426
Gunma-ken	1,082,141	1,020,853	961,026	904,046	830,223	806,277	797,870	792,575	778,729	766,687
Saitama-ken	1,391,712	1,343,674	1,284,502	1,240,280	1,175,697	1,152,823	1,147,133	1,137,773	1,119,126	1,109,604
Chiba-ken	1,395,746	1,401,587	1,358,445	1,316,547	1,275,376	1,245,874	1,239,660	1,230,385	1,221,631	1,215,742
Tōkyō-fu	3,719,335	3,145,365	3,053,946	2,532,677	2,101,784	1,948,581	1,907,174	1,867,913	1,829,583	1,790,731
Kanagawa-ken	1,323,026	1,228,254	1,178,098	1,051,433	926,884	870,256	852,283	834,624	811,986	799,862
Niigata-ken	1,916,017	1,911,308	1,822,239	1,780,123	1,745,625	1,733,629	1,736,456	1,731,329	1,719,562	1,713,384
Toyama-ken	803,191	805,613	770,665	776,851	766,407	754,799	762,892	764,399	763,450	764,196
Ishikawa-ken	802,835	805,266	780,150	768,155	751,320	749,775	755,734	754,120	752,202	753,871
Fukui-ken	636,847	651,513	630,439	635,881	621,468	612,620	619,273	618,203	613,486	610,550
Yamanashi-ken	633,224	608,969	573,341	540,657	506,497	492,689	489,412	482,349	474,959	471,480
Nagano-ken	1,564,354	1,484,205	1,402,072	1,348,556	1,264,918	1,231,859	1,221,113	1,210,435	1,189,936	1,179,234
Gifu-ken	1,120,482	1,094,961	1,031,156	1,020,765	977,922	960,713	960,502	960,062	949,235	941,523
Shizuoka-ken	1,591,772	1,483,712	1,376,048	1,293,470	1,200,322	1,175,982	1,162,613	1,148,653	1,128,584	1,117,127
Aichi-ken	2,140,077	2,073,224	1,886,739	1,752,042	1,639,611	1,592,733	1,577,320	1,553,447	1,529,349	1,512,420
Mie-ken	1,114,891	1,101,573	1,077,295	1,044,323	996,646	967,406	963,668	960,773	950,038	943,376
Shiga-ken	703,944	697,369	694,370	716,920	694,606	688,343	689,723	690,043	686,715	682,455
Kyōto-fu	1,383,890	1,288,213	1,155,671	1,055,119	997,488	957,260	957,775	951,825	937,383	924,093
Ōsaka-fu	2,888,492	2,461,067	2,144,030	1,823,456	1,600,923	1,503,771	1,456,176	1,422,750	1,400,308	1,380,768
Hyōgo-ken	2,321,053	2,143,791	1,982,983	1,833,957	1,717,634	1,652,366	1,631,241	1,610,829	1,595,428	1,581,525
Nara-ken	594,482	600,711	569,772	558,314	535,619	524,562	521,918	518,025	512,181	508,963
Wakayama-ken	795,400	770,293	723,357	697,766	672,225	656,025	651,021	644,983	636,699	634,494
Tottori-ken	465,281	470,674	441,142	435,959	421,020	412,965	411,585	407,650	404,111	404,321
Shimane-ken	717,530	758,754	738,048	731,295	716,586	709,065	706,028	705,674	700,921	702,301
Okayama-ken	1,285,590	1,261,142	1,223,207	1,188,244	1,135,826	1,108,393	1,100,984	1,094,551	1,083,743	1,084,423
Hiroshima-ken	1,687,926	1,691,699	1,598,755	1,508,713	1,449,622	1,405,674	1,388,193	1,367,820	1,346,327	1,342,484
Yamaguchi-ken	1,099,048	1,089,791	1,044,926	1,015,156	979,596	961,065	952,300	948,234	939,940	938,158
Tokushima-ken	744,088	742,320	720,888	707,545	688,123	676,694	675,570	674,976	670,745	679,046
Kagawa-ken	714,374	759,556	729,563	711,603	694,280	676,681	673,378	674,600	671,638	675,237
Ehime-ken	1,128,039	1,097,989	1,057,547	1,034,962	995,441	971,955	964,079	956,166	945,101	942,632
Kōchi-ken	708,710	693,548	670,910	646,008	622,950	609,005	600,865	598,011	590,875	587,428
Fukuoka-ken	2,112,596	1,926,417	1,721,084	1,571,158	1,425,625	1,357,777	1,333,423	1,313,777	1,285,082	1,275,050
Saga-ken	679,322	693,611	671,531	654,593	618,679	599,679	596,275	587,287	579,844	577,175
Nagasaki-ken	1,230,249	1,134,700	1,103,590	1,015,364	902,455	845,441	832,616	820,338	803,713	795,461
Kumamoto-ken	1,311,325	1,303,405	1,236,361	1,198,486	1,156,270	1,122,068	1,108,802	1,105,932	1,097,299	1,084,165
Ōita-ken	920,994	926,936	880,290	854,982	835,917	819,996	814,064	805,374	796,456	794,050
Miyazaki-ken	651,151	597,472	542,088	501,926	464,510	455,535	450,416	447,126	439,273	436,067
Kagoshima-ken	1,462,497	1,397,387	1,275,465	1,184,143	1,104,220	1,083,745	1,069,752	1,058,171	1,042,962	1,036,863
Okinawa-ken	580,940	534,415	502,309	476,230	460,221	449,112	442,834	439,578	432,078	421,769
Japan Proper	58,087,277	55,131,270	51,742,486	48,542,736	45,403,041	43,978,495	43,499,833	43,048,226	42,430,985	42,060,976

Prefectures	Dec 31, 1892	Dec 31, 1891	Dec 31, 1890	Dec 31, 1889	Dec 31, 1888	Dec 31, 1887	Dec 31, 1886	Jan 1, 1886	Jan 1, 1885	Jan 1, 1884
Hokkaidō	493,024	452,152	414,430	378,188	347,950	326,614	309,121	284,040		
Nemuro-ken									17,224	13,172
Sapporo-ken									109,781	95,744
Hakodate-ken									146,335	140,959
Aomori-ken	559,391	551,389	545,026	538,110	530,292	523,226	515,779	499,549	495,182	493,137
Iwate-ken	682,996	676,665	671,956	667,115	656,047	651,989	641,395	628,591	622,426	615,616
Miyagi-ken	776,378	758,013	751,830	760,291	736,628	720,075	688,124	665,345	651,401	644,417
Akita-ken	712,738	703,482	697,298	690,122	682,928	662,917	654,037	644,367	639,259	640,575
Yamagata-ken	773,015	764,701	756,909	750,840	741,896	732,913	722,978	717,252	709,145	705,507
Fukushima-ken	980,310	964,578	952,489	934,449	913,459	893,954	870,822	855,079	861,428	857,833
Ibaraki-ken	1,046,682	1,034,620	1,025,497	1,014,354	998,976	980,803	967,480	948,161	938,377	929,747
Tochigi-ken	731,893	722,510	713,362	699,121	684,341	670,042	655,880	641,420	635,751	627,441
Gunma-ken	759,617	749,030	738,061	722,865	718,215	690,880	667,931	648,329	640,871	636,082
Saitama-ken	1,098,947	1,087,361	1,081,121	1,069,144	1,054,483	1,039,376	1,015,824	1,004,020	994,704	985,889
Chiba-ken	1,205,153	1,196,785	1,191,353	1,184,062	1,172,138	1,159,287	1,141,621	1,125,375	1,118,109	1,113,651
Tōkyō-fu	1,519,583	1,500,026	1,486,671	1,628,551	1,559,517	1,509,757	1,455,647	1,276,506	1,233,843	1,217,542
Kanagawa-ken	1,015,481	992,047	979,756	960,069	947,766	923,178	896,948	865,976	848,682	831,151
Niigata-ken	1,711,968	1,700,427	1,693,727	1,681,985	1,665,378	1,652,736	1,632,257	1,628,650	1,601,796	1,589,304
Toyama-ken	763,105	759,040	754,105	745,248	738,445	726,078	715,384	712,532	706,014	701,622
Ishikawa-ken	753,886	753,445	753,337	751,605	745,110	737,224	728,974	739,141	740,362	735,478
Fukui-ken	607,450	605,014	603,444	602,342	596,704	590,548	585,776	592,331	591,669	583,065
Yamanashi-ken	467,337	463,263	458,534	452,781	445,182	437,475	430,996	425,898	419,444	416,497
Nagano-ken	1,171,819	1,158,936	1,146,071	1,128,690	1,111,946	1,095,998	1,074,069	1,057,494	1,048,065	1,043,341
Gifu-ken	936,219	930,604	932,658	918,456	909,226	899,311	889,739	884,848	880,277	873,020
Shizuoka-ken	1,105,875	1,094,476	1,084,562	1,070,841	1,058,226	1,038,941	1,019,301	1,002,693	991,127	982,512
Aichi-ken	1,497,791	1,483,744	1,473,099	1,456,294	1,444,011	1,429,486	1,404,106	1,386,473	1,373,419	1,370,576
Mie-ken	936,465	931,687	926,376	918,369	909,702	901,698	892,654	883,462	879,353	877,666
Shiga-ken	681,145	678,775	677,502	671,788	667,563	661,323	654,558	648,339	645,519	639,634
Kyōto-fu	914,700	903,189	894,928	887,031	875,084	866,743	849,362	848,761	853,058	851,246
Ōsaka-fu	1,370,232	1,357,358	1,348,317	1,324,216	1,281,150	1,245,695	1,695,196	1,691,243	1,681,935	1,653,157
Hyōgo-ken	1,576,970	1,562,323	1,551,367	1,541,731	1,521,817	1,499,704	1,480,685	1,466,102	1,458,647	1,448,199
Nara-ken	506,304	502,033	500,742	498,871	496,431	489,213				
Wakayama-ken	633,771	630,667	630,373	627,332	623,842	621,554	613,862	619,343	618,026	612,505
Tottori-ken	405,725	403,589	401,697	399,060	394,333	390,061	386,083	383,241	381,838	381,300
Shimane-ken	703,256	700,665	697,878	695,782	692,101	688,127	684,257	684,856	682,536	678,813
Okayama-ken	1,082,745	1,076,391	1,072,706	1,068,086	1,062,155	1,051,333	1,043,029	1,045,669	1,040,280	1,037,239
Hiroshima-ken	1,336,145	1,324,538	1,319,507	1,303,457	1,289,109	1,278,537	1,276,461	1,272,876	1,272,105	1,259,148
Yamaguchi-ken	937,036	929,629	927,015	922,497	914,083	911,859	897,557	899,606	900,339	897,296
Tokushima-ken	682,398	682,225	683,994	681,863	676,154	670,963	661,548	656,064	651,731	651,109
Kagawa-ken	675,940	673,004	672,557	668,548	660,484					
Ehime-ken	940,009	933,510	926,972	921,708	906,414	1,557,257	1,533,988	1,529,375	1,527,562	1,511,820
Kōchi-ken	584,569	580,330	577,937	575,852	569,874	562,066	557,776	552,513	548,638	546,977
Fukuoka-ken	1,258,058	1,244,912	1,236,015	1,224,551	1,209,295	1,188,877	1,159,294	1,148,328	1,139,986	1,135,496
Saga-ken	569,831	568,925	565,568	560,594	553,423	547,832	534,981	527,244	522,697	519,712
Nagasaki-ken	786,416	776,779	773,095	762,812	752,402	739,825	729,042	719,082	712,631	707,604
Kumamoto-ken	1,075,301	1,064,885	1,057,646	1,052,478	1,042,281	1,030,261	1,020,460	1,003,777	1,000,911	1,001,011
Ōita-ken	792,912	790,063	792,085	788,635	781,554	773,101	762,275	761,476	757,747	752,161
Miyazaki-ken	431,693	424,033	416,824	412,729	407,827	403,810	394,261	386,299	383,769	381,879
Kagoshima-ken	1,024,598	1,014,560	1,005,816	998,153	985,271	962,219	943,088	941,063	933,196	935,094
Okinawa-ken	419,970	412,354	406,622	381,142	374,266	375,280	378,809	373,587	367,874	364,701
Japan	41,696,847	41,268,732	40,968,835	40,692,808	40,105,479	39,510,146	38,833,415	38,276,376	37,975,069	37,687,645

=== 1872 to 1883 ===
Population in the following table is given according to the original family registries (本籍, honseki) population concept for enumerating the people, based on koseki registration system.

- Source: Japan Household Tables (as of January 1 for the years of 1883, 1882, 1878 and 1877),

Japan Population Tables (as of January 1 for the years of 1881 and 1880),
Japan Gun Ku Population Tables (as of January 1, 1879),
Japan Registered Population Tables (as of January 1, for the years of 1876, 1875, 1874 and 1873; and as of March 8, 1872).

Prefectures	Japanese	Jan 1, 1883	Jan 1, 1882	Jan 1, 1881	Jan 1, 1880	Jan 1, 1879	Jan 1, 1878	Jan 1, 1877	Jan 1, 1876	Jan 1, 1875	Jan 1, 1874	Jan 1, 1873	Mar 8, 1872
Nemuro-ken	根室県	5,642											
Sapporo-ken	札幌県	61,144											
Hakodate-ken	函館県	117,063											
Kaitaku-shi	開拓使		177,901	168,084	163,355	158,615	151,735	150,667	149,554	149,008	146,443	123,668	123,668
Aomori-ken	青森県	488,505	487,687	484,274	475,413	468,517	464,985	462,865	489,245	484,428	473,098	473,317	473,244
Iwate-ken	岩手県	611,735	605,538	598,132	591,881	592,294	579,249	578,297	327,924	323,434	321,871	320,731	319,486
Iwai-ken	磐井県								385,031				
Mizusawa-ken	水沢県									380,409	379,170	376,079	372,562
Miyagi-ken	宮城県	633,194	629,286	625,332	619,120	616,881	594,684	591,524	421,960	419,135	410,437	408,088	404,577
Akita-ken	秋田県	633,203	628,435	625,506	618,833	621,130	616,148	613,389	609,420	604,114	596,641	581,859	582,297
Tsurugaoka-ken	鶴岡県								207,939				
Sakata-ken	酒田県									207,902	208,107	206,859	203,676
Yamagata-ken	山形県	695,533	693,360	687,718	682,929	681,180	662,913	657,613	312,313	309,837	307,535	302,743	299,291
Okitama-ken	置賜県								132,341	131,935	131,910	131,162	130,293
Fukushima-ken	福島県	840,241	829,990	823,120	808,937	804,866	774,707	765,115	281,824	281,302	270,679	268,959	268,576
Iwasaki-ken	磐前県								258,080	249,553	244,703	242,941	242,906
Wakamatsu-ken	若松県								215,624	212,052	209,671	206,053	203,722
Ibaraki-ken	茨城県	920,876	916,739	906,073	894,376	887,957	875,491	867,701	858,927	378,269	375,172	368,560	366,505
Niihari-ken	新治県									485,119	478,940	474,170	470,509
Tochigi-ken	栃木県	609,000	600,627	593,383	581,358	570,843	550,271	543,245	665,724	648,503	636,348	392,106	388,934
Utsunomiya-ken	宇都宮県											234,888	234,124
Gunma-ken	群馬県	613,410	604,182	593,625	581,556	573,984	554,888	547,991				384,796	382,697
Kumagaya-ken	熊谷県								842,717	828,420	808,913		
Saitama-ken	埼玉県	970,598	962,717	952,689	933,955	929,939	912,528	901,714	455,891	440,433	435,436	429,094	426,989
Iruma-ken	入間県											414,824	410,952
Chiba-ken	千葉県	1,124,085	1,117,696	1,108,678	1,103,292	1,099,676	1,078,635	1,071,142	1,061,664	1,055,373	1,043,189		
Inba-ken	印旛県											578,927	574,652
Kisarazu-ken	木更津県											458,619	456,689
Tōkyō-fu	東京府	999,623	987,911	979,109	957,144	953,776	881,443	877,049	873,646	855,270	830,935	813,504	779,361
Ogasawara-tō	小笠原島				156	194							
Kanagawa-ken	神奈川県	800,925	790,735	772,903	757,462	754,610	715,258	707,272	497,677	507,928	502,504	479,180	492,714
Ashigara-ken	足柄県								355,880	353,609	344,132	342,298	339,582
Niigata-ken	新潟県	1,586,599	1,581,168	1,564,312	1,546,338	1,530,712	1,504,601	1,500,061	1,388,812	1,388,353	1,368,782	637,576	635,484
Aikawa-ken	相川県								104,764	104,630	104,405	103,553	103,098
Kashiwazaki-ken	柏崎県											719,646	718,249
Niikawa-ken	新川県								649,458	638,822	629,006	623,977	480,638
Ishikawa-ken	石川県	1,428,073	1,412,802	1,856,402	1,833,778	1,852,811	1,825,507	1,806,509	696,429	691,735	686,249	669,647	403,357
Nanao-ken	七尾県												397,511
Fukui-ken	福井県	582,210	577,717										
Tsuruga-ken	敦賀県								553,425	548,833	547,582	200,832	199,819
Asuwa-ken	足羽県											339,210	346,700
Yamanashi-ken	山梨県	410,246	409,929	404,299	395,447	391,123	381,229	377,944	374,250	369,255	364,345	362,973	360,068
Nagano-ken	長野県	1,033,969	1,022,408	1,012,142	1,000,414	986,077	973,959	965,677	486,812	481,351	474,141	469,032	466,652
Chikuma-ken	筑摩県								570,701	564,332	556,959	554,657	550,841
Gifu-ken	岐阜県	868,333	855,575	849,221	839,613	831,887	818,984	806,158	692,218	683,050	672,627	668,148	660,896
Shizuoka-ken	静岡県	985,881	980,793	972,265	970,022	980,766	976,405	968,814	382,814	378,076	372,674	369,731	368,505
Hamamatsu-ken	浜松県								421,342	420,513	414,721	416,543	414,928
Aichi-ken	愛知県	1,354,996	1,332,050	1,317,792	1,303,812	1,295,452	1,267,206	1,250,839	1,244,711	1,234,003	1,217,521	1,217,444	604,116
Nukata-ken	額田県												606,252
Mie-ken	三重県	870,137	857,887	850,791	842,113	834,893	830,415	818,877	429,986	427,831	417,439	419,068	413,865
Watarai-ken	度会県								380,475	369,479	363,563	364,565	363,732
Shiga-ken	滋賀県	639,961	633,447	745,133	738,211	729,893	721,099	711,802	589,747	584,756	579,704	578,099	305,232
Inukami-ken	犬上県												271,332
Kyōto-fu	京都府	840,951	835,227	831,012	822,112	814,273	798,911	792,042	574,918	571,192	572,763	569,733	567,334
Ōsaka-fu	大阪府	1,585,696	1,572,333	586,729	582,668	578,270	553,777	551,950	549,280	545,035	535,409	530,885	530,885
Sakai-ken	堺県			960,711	957,407	955,748	923,030	911,738	470,596	466,048	455,450	451,442	446,852
Hyōgo-ken	兵庫県	1,433,355	1,419,421	1,406,613	1,391,928	1,370,720	1,357,377	1,343,758	204,141	201,389	197,512	200,058	198,559
Toyo'oka-ken	豊岡県								513,079	508,027	507,815	507,465	505,073
Shikama-ken	飾磨県								659,643	651,033	641,946	639,576	635,791
Nara-ken	奈良県								433,938	430,734	427,635	423,004	418,326
Wakayama-ken	和歌山県	610,182	606,754	603,723	601,236	602,075	591,668	584,976	579,112	572,436	565,696	562,410	556,919
Tottori-ken	鳥取県	379,747	380,915						395,632	392,589	388,861	386,186	385,531
Shimane-ken	島根県	674,984	669,410	1,043,865	1,037,260	1,034,581	1,023,678	1,017,361	342,621	340,398	340,065	340,222	340,042
Hamada-ken	浜田県								270,804	268,455	263,955	262,035	259,611
Okayama-ken	岡山県	1,029,567	1,019,674	1,007,054	1,000,570	1,001,220	984,621	976,774	961,035	335,592	333,575	333,714	387,459
Hokujō-ken	北条県								218,605	217,362	215,792	215,676	215,602
Oda-ken	小田県									619,647	608,353	605,666	546,430
Hiroshima-ken	広島県	1,252,811	1,243,032	1,225,057	1,213,152	1,207,947	1,197,835	1,190,069	964,337	942,827	941,978	925,962	919,047
Yamaguchi-ken	山口県	897,370	888,442	883,885	877,614	875,607	855,618	850,608	844,550	838,946	836,419	830,060	827,536
Tokushima-ken	徳島県	649,616	642,172	637,550									
Myōdō-ken	名東県								787,160	1,349,672	1,335,364	755,533	750,985
Kagawa-ken	香川県								591,584			564,351	559,712
Ehime-ken	愛媛県	1,491,614	1,472,680	1,453,472	1,438,895	1,432,627	1,403,693	1,394,091	793,214	791,522	786,408		
Ishizuchi-ken	石鉄県											420,303	418,561
Kamiyama-ken	神山県											358,253	357,413
Kōchi-ken	高知県	549,184	546,642	550,686	1,179,247	1,185,764	1,164,723	1,160,235	534,070	531,863	528,728	526,285	524,511
Fukuoka-ken	福岡県	1,128,289	1,118,652	1,109,475	1,097,215	1,087,604	1,070,244	1,064,050	457,335	450,965	448,628	445,278	441,175
Kokura-ken	小倉県								322,156	317,108	312,539	307,535	304,574
Mizuma-ken	三潴県								400,504	396,903	396,371	393,656	391,535
Saga-ken	佐賀県								491,260	487,008	486,946	480,034	506,667
Nagasaki-ken	長崎県	1,212,157	1,204,449	1,196,065	1,190,335	1,192,134	1,173,263	1,167,367	672,278	668,974	668,482	665,123	630,487
Kumamoto-ken	熊本県	997,830	993,373	995,673	986,695	981,341	980,976	980,642					
Shirakawa-ken	白川県								976,753	965,242	957,790	950,389	513,593
Yatsushiro-ken	八代県												439,444
Ōita-ken	大分県	746,411	741,201	740,009	731,964	728,115	718,816	714,234	583,740	580,347	578,163	565,460	562,318
Miyazaki-ken	宮崎県								388,508	384,071	388,083	382,564	
Mimitsu-ken	美々津県												201,798
Miyakonojō-ken	都城県												310,121
Kagoshima-ken	鹿児島県	1,291,586	1,290,281	1,279,631	1,270,463	1,261,909	1,219,942	1,218,383	820,654	813,692	812,327	806,902	670,864
Okinawa-ken	沖縄県	360,770	358,880	356,801	310,545	310,545							
Ryūkyū-han	琉球藩						168,064	167,822	167,572	167,320	167,073	166,789	166,789
Japan	日本	37,017,302	36,700,118	36,358,994	35,928,821	35,768,556	34,898,576	34,628,365	34,338,404	33,997,449	33,625,678	33,300,675	33,110,825

=== 1868 to 1871 ===
Several demographic data remain for three urban prefectures (府, fu),(i.e. Kyōto-fu, Ōsaka-fu and Tōkyō-fu), 266 domains (藩, han), 40 prefectures (県, ken) and one commission (使, shi) (i.e. Kaitaku-shi only in Hokkaidō) that existed for short time between Meiji Restoration and the Abolition of the han system, though not thoroughly surveyed. Prefectural system was only introduced to imperial territories (天領, tenryō) which the Meiji government gained from Tokugawa shogunate or the revolted feudal lords, while many areas still belonged to local lordship governments. The table below summarizes demographic data from three sources.

Source': (ref.1): Table of households for shi, fu and ken (Meiji-shi-yō).

(ref.2): Kokudaka and Population Table of fu, han and ken (Ōkuma Shigenobu collection).
(ref.3): Bunzo Kure, "Estate population Table of fu, han and ken" Tōkei Shūshi (Statistics Bulletin) no. 8 pp. 96–107 (1882). Estate populations were also given.

Statistical data were given as of August 29, 1871 (29th day of the 8th month, Meiji 4) for (1), as of February 2, 1869 (1st day of the 1st month, Meiji 2), for (2) or uncertain for (3), although all these populations seemed to be collected from several koseki populations surveyed in 1869 and 1870. Naotarō Sekiyama noted that the population of Japan as of August, 1870 (7th month, Meiji 3) was 32,794,897 (Kinsei Nihon jinkō-no kenkyū (Study of the Population of Japan in the Early Modern Period) (1948)).

Fu, han and ken	Japanese	Population (ref.1)	Population (ref.2)	Population (ref.3)	Number of districts per province	Number of remote territories
Kyōto-fu	京都府	373,704	374,496	373,688	8 in Yamashiro	5
Ōsaka-fu	大阪府	427,395	427,395	427,395	3 in Settsu	2
Tōkyō-fu	東京府	674,269	674,447	674,269	3 in Musashi	1
Three urban prefectures (fu) total		1,475,368	1,476,338	1,475,352		8
Yodo-han	淀藩	65,439	64,728	72,786	4 in Yamashiro, 1 in Settsu, 3 in Kawachi, 3 in Izumi, 8 in Ōmi, 4 in Shimōsa, 1 in Hitachi, 1 in Kōzuke	41
Kōriyama-han	郡山藩	99,970	102,420	102,427	7 in Yamato, 2 in Kawachi, 5 in Ōmi	14
Tawaramoto-han	田原本藩	4,363	4,363	4,521	1 in Yamato	1
Takatori-han	高取藩	22,250	22,250	22,390	5 in Yamato	5
Kujira-han	櫛羅藩	5,140	5,140	5,384	3 in Yamato	3
Yanagimoto-han	柳本藩	6,479	6,479	6,728	3 in Yamato	4
Yagyū-han	柳生藩	6,844	7,018	6,587	2 in Yamato, 1 in Yamashiro	4
Shibamura-han	芝村藩	7,338	7,338	7,401	2 in Yamato, 1 in Settsu	2
Tannan-han	丹南藩	8,746	8,766	8,823	3 in Kawachi, 1 in Shimotsuke	2
Kishiwada-han	岸和田藩	66,134	66,334	67,622	2 in Izumi	1
Hakata-han	伯太藩	11,240	11,204	11,211	2 in Izumi, 3 in Kawachi, 4 in Ōmi	9
Koizumi-han	小泉藩	9,367	9,367	9,230	1 in Izumi, 2 in Yamato, 2 in Yamashiro, 1 in Settsu, 1 in Kawachi	7
Amagasaki-han	尼崎藩	52,325	49,403	49,614	4 in Settsu, 3 in Harima	9
Takatsuki-han	高槻藩	25,426	26,055	54,928	3 in Settsu; 1 in Tamba	4
Sanda-han	三田藩	21,811	21,891	21,898	1 in Settsu, 1 in Tamba	2
Asada-han	麻田藩	10,756	10,756	10,806	2 in Settsu, 4 in Bitchū	9
Tsu-han	津藩	244,252	224,418	244,243	8 in Ise, 4 in Iga, 1 in Yamashiro, 4 in Yamashiro, 1 in Shimōsa	12
Kuwana-han	桑名藩	64,868	64,866	65,783	3 in Ise	1
Kameyama-han	亀山藩	45,696	45,591	45,597	3 in Ise, 2 in Bitschū	4
Hisai-han	久居藩	38,842	38,842	37,883	6 in Iga, 1 in Yamashiro, 5 in Yamato	11
Nagashima-han	長島藩	15,764	15,764	15,771	1 in Iga, 1 in Kazusa	2
Kanbe-han	神戸藩	10,397	10,397	10,603	3 in Ise, 1 in Kawachi	3
Komono-han	菰野藩	10,064	10,064	10,067	1 in Ise, 1 in Ōmi	3
Toba-han	鳥羽藩	54,233	4,233	52,797	2 in Shima, 3 in Ise	1
Nagoya-han	名古屋藩	917,497	921,517	918,141	8 in Owari, 1 in Mikawa, 19 in Mino, 1 in Ōmi, 2 in Shinano	13
Inuyama-han	犬山藩	53,732	53,617	53,540	8 in Owari, 3 in Mino	13
Toyohashi-han	豊橋藩	76,108	76,108	77,030	6 in Mikawa, 3 in Ōmi, 1 in Kazusa	9
Nishio-han	西尾藩	55,850	57,060	54,347	5 in Mikawa, 3 in Echizen, 1 in Awa	11
Okazaki-han	岡崎藩	52,960	52,958	52,819	3 in Mikawa	1
Shigehara-han	重原藩	34,789	34,789	34,897	4 in Mikawa	4
Hambara-han	半原藩	15,071	15,122	15,117	2 in Mikawa, 1 in Kōzuke, 1 in Musashi, 4 in Settsu, 2 in Tamba	9
Kariya-han	刈谷藩	27,821	27,821	27,843	2 in Mikawa; 1 in Iwashiro	1
Koromo-han	挙母藩	14,954	14,954	19,674	2 in Mikawa, 2 in Mimasaka	5
Tahara-han	田原藩	22,989	22,887	23,600	1 in Mikawa	1
Nishi-Ōhira-han	西大平藩	7,358	7,318	7,272	4 in Mikawa, 1 in Sagami	5
Nishibata-han	西端藩	12,826	12,781	12,812	1 in Mikawa, 2 in Izu, 2 in Kazusa, 2 in Shimōsa, 2 in Kōzuke, 1 in Musashi; 1 in Shimotsuke	11
Horie-han	堀江藩	7,739	7,739	7,695	3 in Tōtōmi	5
Shizuoka-han	静岡藩	813,886	813,886	876,819	7 in Suruga, 12 in Tōtōmi, 6 in Mikawa	7
Odawara-han	小田原藩	92,883	92,833	92,837	6 in Sagami, 2 in Izu	6
Ogino-Yamanaka-han	荻野山中藩	12,982	12,957	13,018	3 in Sagami	2
Oshi-han	忍藩	113,703	110,305	114,003	7 in Musashi, 3 in Ise, 3 in Harima	14
Kawagoe-han	川越藩	61,994	61,994	62,760	1 in Musashi, 1 in Hitachi, 1 in Mikawa, 4 in Ōmi	7
Iwatsuki-han	岩槻藩	40,585	40,802	41,234	7 in Musashi, 1 in Hitachi, 1 in Kōzuke, 1 in Shimōsa; 3 in Kazusa	13
Mutsuura-han	六浦藩	11,915	11,915	12,860	2 in Musashi, 2 in Sagami, 2 in Shimotsuke	6
Nagao-han	長尾藩	73,283	75,487	76,351	4 in Awa, 1 in Kazusa	5
Hanabusa-han	花房藩	63,282	63,472	64,505	1 in Awa, 4 in Kazusa	5
Kachiyama-han	加知山藩	16,827	16,084	16,829	1 in Awa, 1 in Echizen	1
Tateyama-han	館山藩	23,850	23,850	23,680	1 in Awa	1
Tsurumai-han	鶴舞藩	63,858	63,413	62,611	4 in Kazusa, 2 in Harima	4
Matsuo-han	松尾藩	47,584	47,584	47,034	2 in Kazusa	1
Kikuma-han	菊間藩	74,069	74,069	73,624	1 in Kazusa, 2 in Mikawa, 3 in Izu	13
Kururi-han	久留里藩	23,098	23,032	22,900	1 in Kazusa	1
Ōtaki-han	大多喜藩	22,649	22,678	22,686	1 in Kazusa	1
Iino-han	飯野藩	23,080	23,080	23,205	1 in Kazusa; 2 in Settsu; 1 in Tamba	1
Sanuki-han	佐貫藩	17,732	17,652	17,639	1 in Kazusa	1
Tsurumaki-han	鶴牧藩	20,689	20,689	21,586	2 in Kazusa, 3 in Tamba	8
Ichinomiya-han	一宮藩	14,533	14,533	14,541	1 in Kazusa, 2 in Kōzuke	3
Sakurai-han	桜井藩	13,387	13,087	13,364	2 in Kazusa	1
Kokubo-han	小久保藩	9,761	9,761	9,781	2 in Kazusa	1
Sakura-han	佐倉藩	119,129	119,129	119,132	5 in Kazusa, 2 in Hitachi, 7 in Shimōsa, 4 in Musashi, 3 in Sagami	20
Koga-han	古河藩	83,432	83,432	83,578	2 in Shimōsa, 5 in Settsu, 4 in Harima, 1 in Mimasaka, 5 in Musashi, 5 in Shimotsuke	24
Sekiyado-han	関宿藩	49,057	49,057	48,755	3 in Shimōsa, 2 in Hitachi, 2 in Shimotsuke	9
Yūki-han	結城藩	18,436	18,580	18,445	1 in Shimōsa, 2 in Kazusa, 2 in Hitachi, 2 in Shimotsuke	8
Tako-han	多古藩	8,249	8,251	7,896	1 in Shimōsa, 2 in Shimotsuke, 2 in Iwaki	5
Takaoka-han	高岡藩	8,284	8,294	8,289	3 in Shimōsa, 2 in Kazusa	5
Omigawa-han	小見川藩	8,289	8,289	8,221	2 in Shimōsa, 1 in Iwaki	3
Oyumi-han	生実藩	10,330	10,330	10,311	3 in Shimōsa, 2 in Kazusa, 2 in Sagami	6
Sogano-han	曾我野藩	10,612	10,606	10,612	2 in Shimōsa	2
Mito-han	水戸藩	259,344	264,256	281,225	7 in Hitachi, 1 in Shimotsuke	1
Tsuchiura-han	土浦藩	78,278	78,278	74,799	4 in Hitachi; 2 in Mimasaka	2
Kasama-han	笠間藩	47,832	47,832	47,839	2 in Hitachi, 3 in Iwaki	4
Matsuoka-han	松岡藩	12,319	11,848	12,329	1 in Hitachi	1
Shimodate-han	下館藩	15,196	15,196	12,764	1 in Hitachi, 2 in Kawachi	3
Ishioka-han	石岡藩	18,102	18,002	18,113	3 in Hitachi, 1 in Iwashiro	3
Motegi-han	茂木藩	13,480	13,480	13,170	2 in Hitachi, 1 in Shimotsuke	2
Ryūgasaki-han	龍崎藩	9,642	9,642	9,649	2 in Kazusa, 3 in Shimōsa, 2 in Musashi, 1 in Hitachi	12
Ushiku-han	牛久藩	8,674	8,604	9,070	3 in Hitachi, 3 in Shimōsa	5
Asō-han	麻生藩	9,283	9,317	9,092	2 in Hitachi	3
Shizuku-han	志筑藩	5,479	5,479	5,785	1 in Hitachi	2
Shishido-han	宍戸藩	6,309	6,309	6,188	1 in Hitachi	2
Shimotsuma-han	下妻藩	8,786	8,806	8,815	1 in Hitachi, 2 in Musashi, 1 in Shimotsuke	4
Hikone-han	彦根藩	172,545	173,691	189,946	6 in Ōmi, 1 in Shimotsuke, 2 in Musashi	4
Zeze-han	膳所藩	45,684	45,701	45,706	6 in Ōmi, 3 in Kawachi	9
Minakuchi-han	水口藩	20,621	20,621	21,768	3 in Ōmi	3
Ōmizo-han	大溝藩	abolished	12,319	12,461	2 in Ōmi	2
Nishi-Ōji-han	西大路藩	8,681	8,926	8,841	2 in Ōmi, 1 in Kawachi	3
Yoshimi-han	吉見藩	13,783	14,011	14,149	3 in Ōmi, 2 in Izumi, 1 in Kazusa	6
Yamakami-han	山上藩	9,813	9,813	10,246	5 in Ōmi, 1 in Tamba	6
Miyagawa-han	宮川藩	7,192	7,159	7,166	6 in Ōmi	6
Asahiyama-han	朝日山藩	26,206	n.a.	n.a.	1 in Ōmi	1
Ōgaki-han	大垣藩	78,901	78,901	78,709	7 in Mino	2
Gujō-han	郡上藩	57,641	57,563	54,850	1 in Mino, 3 in Echizen	6
Kanō-han	加納藩	29,484	29,494	29,475	1 in Mino, 1 in Kawachi; 2 in Settsu	2
Iwamura-han	岩村藩	36,909	36,909	37,145	6 in Mino	6
Imao-han	今尾藩	18,734	18,734	18,747	5 in Mino, 6 in Owari	12
Nomura-han	野村藩	8,771	9,243	8,566	1 in Mino, 2 in Mikawa	2
Naegi-han	苗木藩	25,034	25,034	25,183	2 in Mino	1
Takatomi-han	高富藩	6,708	6,708	6,712	3 in Mino, 2 in Shimotsuke	5
Matsushiro-han	松代藩	148,589	148,589	148,642	4 in Shinano	2
Matsumoto-han	松本藩	127,739	127,739	123,153	2 in Shinano	1
Ueda-han	上田藩	62,240	61,333	62,230	2 in Shinano	2
Takatō-han	高遠藩	47,883	47,883	47,888	2 in Shinano	1
Takashima-han	高島藩	66,883	62,945	65,356	2 in Shinano	1
Iiyama-han	飯山藩	32,325	32,438	32,639	1 in Shinano	1
Komoro-han	小諸藩	31,910	31,910	31,918	2 in Shinano	1
Iida-han	飯田藩	28,396	28,175	28,393	1 in Shinano	1
Tatsuoka-han	龍岡藩	abolished	13,534	13,652	1 in Shinano, 2 in Mikawa	3
Iwamurata-han	岩村田藩	10,606	9,979	10,200	2 in Shinano	1
Suzaka-han	須坂藩	11,324	11,315	11,324	1 in Shinano	1
Maebashi-han	前橋藩	176,149	176,149	178,302	8 in Kōzuke, 2 in Shimotsuke, 10 in Musashi, 3 in Ōmi; 2 in Hitachi	28
Takasaki-han	高崎藩	91,473	94,276	97,800	5 in Kōzuke, 1 in Echigo, 1 in Shimōsa, 1 in Musashi	5
Tatebayashi-han	館林藩	72,985	72,985	76,747	3 in Kōzuke; 1 in Shimotsuke; 3 in Kawachi	2
Numata-han	沼田藩	21,428	21,402	41,047	2 in Kōzuke, 2 in Kawachi, 3 in Mimasaka	7
Annaka-han	安中藩	27,125	27,042	27,427	2 in Kōzuke, 3 in Shimōsa	3
Obata-han	小幡藩	14,007	14,007	14,204	3 in Kōzuke	1
Isesaki-han	伊勢崎藩	20,986	20,986	21,663	2 in Kōzuke	1
Nanukaichi-han	七日市藩	6,992	6,992	7,024	1 in Kōzuke	2
Utsunomiya-han	宇都宮藩	58,761	58,366	60,180	4 in Shimotsuke	4
Mibu-han	壬生藩	25,962	24,372	25,956	1 in Shimotsuke, 3 in Shimōsa, 1 in Yamato, 2 in Harima	14
Karasuyama-han	烏山藩	28,494	28,494	27,686	2 in Shimotsuke, 4 in Sagami, 2 in Shimōsa	9
Sano-han	佐野藩	12,995	12,995	13,012	1 in Shimotsuke, 4 in Kōzuke, 1 in Ōmi	5
Ōtawara-han	大田原藩	11,531	11,465	12,535	4 in Shimotsuke	6
Ashikaga-han	足利藩	18,704	3,866	18,719	3 in Shimotsuke; 1 in Musashi	3
Fukiage-han	吹上藩	6,834	6,834	6,914	3 in Shimotsuke, 3 in Ise	6
Kurobane-han	黒羽藩	19,493	19,493	19,532	2 in Shimotsuke	3
Tanagura-han	棚倉藩	30,451	30,451	30,606	2 in Iwaki	1
Nakamura-han	中村藩	63,110	63,110	63,893	3 in Iwaki	3
Miharu-han	三春藩	36,769	36,774	36,762	1 in Iwaki	1
Iwaki-Taira-han	磐城平藩	16,339	15,422	15,377	2 in Iwaki	1
Matsukawa-han	松川藩	17,631	16,896	17,404	1 in Iwaki, 3 in Hitachi	3
Izumi-han	泉藩	17,025	10,725	10,351	1 in Iwaki, 1 in Musashi; 1 in Kōzuke	2
Yunagaya-han	湯長谷藩	8,265	8,265	8,235	2 in Iwaki, 2 in Tamba	4
Nihonmatsu-han	二本松藩	37,307	37,335	37,348	1 in Iwashiro	1
Sendaih-han	仙台藩	204,964	204,902	239,897	6 in Rikuzen	3
Ichinoseki-han	一関藩	27,399	27,397	26,197	1 in Rikuchū	1
Hirosaki-han	弘前藩	288,842	288,842	255,131	1 in Mutsu	1
Tate-han	館藩	79,742	79,742	77,805	4 in Oshima, 1 in Iwashiro	3
Tonami-han	斗南藩	75,467	n.a.	n.a.	3 in Mutsu	4
Hachinohe-han	八戸藩	42,603	42,603	68,195	1 in Mutsu, 2 in Rikuchū	2
Kuroishi-han	黒石藩	15,932	15,932	15,949	1 in Mutsu, 1 in Iwashiro	2
Shichinohe-han	七戸藩	15,527	15,527	15,530	1 in Mutsu	1
Yonezawa-han	米沢藩	129,753	129,753	128,765	1 in Uzen	1
Ōizumi-han	大泉藩	95,356	95,327	95,347	1 in Uzen	1
Shinjō-han	新庄藩	57,173	52,173	52,179	2 in Uzen	1
Kaminoyama-han	上山藩	31,449	31,449	31,517	1 in Uzen, 2 in Echigo	3
Tendō-han	天童藩	13,403	13,393	12,389	1 in Uzen	1
Akita-han	秋田藩	435,267	435,267	412,647	6 in Ugo, 2 in Shimotsuke	2
Matsumine-han	松嶺藩	23,100	23,100	23,159	1 in Ugo, 2 in Uzen, 1 in Kōzuke	2
Honjō-han	本荘藩	26,241	26,241	26,257	1 in Ugo	1
Kameda-han	亀田藩	23,894	23,878	23,804	3 in Ugo	2
Yashima-han	矢島藩	15,280	14,590	15,285	1 in Ugo	1
Iwasaki-han	岩崎藩	18,469	18,469	18,486	1 in Ugo	1
Obama-han	小浜藩	111,975	105,434	113,612	3 in Wakasa, 3 in Echizen, 1 in Ōmi	6
Fukui-han	福井藩	202,511	279,529	284,542	7 in Echizen	2
Maruoka-han	丸岡藩	22,791	22,791	21,702	3 in Echizen	3
Ōno-han	大野藩	30,629	30,629	31,115	3 in Echizen	3
Sabae-han	鯖江藩	30,167	30,167	30,275	3 in Echizen	2
Katsuyama-han	勝山藩	18,612	18,612	18,657	1 in Echizen	1
Kanazawa-han	金沢藩	1,065,910	1,080,210	1,086,159	3 in Kaga, 3 in Etchū, 4 in Noto, 1 in Ōmi	5
Daishōji-han	大聖寺藩	48,736	48,036	48,766	2 in Kaga	1
Toyama-han	富山藩	132,415	132,415	116,750	2 in Etchū	1
Takada-han	高田藩	171,056	171,056	168,842	1 in Echigo, 1 in Iwashiro, 1 in Iwaki	2
Shibata-han	新発田藩	192,591	192,591	192,604	1 in Echigo, 1 in Iwashiro	5
Murakami-han	村上藩	83,004	80,034	80,004	3 in Echigo	3
Muramatsu-han	村松藩	36,980	36,980	37,192	1 in Echigo	2
Yoita-han	与板藩	22,530	22,530	22,531	3 in Echigo	3
Mineoka-han	峰岡藩	11,145	11,135	11,881	1 in Echigo	1
Kiyosaki-han	清崎藩	21,930	21,930	22,106	2 in Echigo	2
Shiiya-han	椎谷藩	10,911	10,918	10,812	1 in Echigo, 2 in Shinano	3
Mikkaichi-han	三日市藩	8,419	8,419	9,061	1 in Echigo	1
Kurokawa-han	黒川藩	9,757	9,755	9,179	1 in Echigo	1
Sasayama-han	篠山藩	58,507	58,507	58,734	5 in Tamba, 1 in Settsu, 1 in Tajima	7
Kameoka-han	亀岡藩	49,572	49,228	51,814	4 in Tamba, 1 in Bitchū	4
Fukuchiyama-han	福知山藩	31,037	29,304	31,136	1 in Tamba, 1 in Ōmi	2
Sonobe-han	園部藩	36,895	36,895	35,828	3 in Tamba	4
Kaibara-han	柏原藩	18,475	18,475	18,551	3 in Tamba	5
Ayabe-han	綾部藩	18,516	18,511	18,425	3 in Tamba	3
Yamaga-han	山家藩	11,661	11,661	11,670	1 in Tamba	1
Miyazu-han	宮津藩	71,831	73,674	71,136	4 in Tamba, 4 in Ōmi	6
Maizuru-han	舞鶴藩	49,117	48,978	48,893	1 in Tango	1
Mineyama-han	峰山藩	10,055	10,055	10,775	1 in Tango, 1 in Ōmi, 1 in Hitachi, 1 in Shimōsa	4
Izushi-han	出石藩	35,316	35,316	35,213	4 in Tajima	3
Toyo'oka-han	豊岡藩	19,036	19,518	19,036	2 in Tajima	2
Muraoka-han	村岡藩	15,482	15,476	15,690	1 in Tajima	1
Tottori-han	鳥取藩	378,734	373,065	371,654	8 in Inaba, 6 in Hōki, 3 in Harima	3
Matsue-han	松江藩	296,750	291,694	295,823	10 in Izumo	1
Hirose-han	広瀬藩	26,370	26,370	26,364	2 in Izumo	2
Mori-han	母里藩	8,205	8,215	8,225	1 in Izumo	3
Tsuwano-han	津和野藩	abolished	65,263	69,267	4 in Iwami	4
Himeji-han	姫路藩	222,661	222,661	223,762	10 in Harima	7
Akashi-han	明石藩	76,004	76,004	76,173	2 in Harima, 1 in Mimasaka	2
Tatsuno-han	龍野藩	50,879	50,879	51,051	3 in Harima, 1 in Mimasaka	6
Akō-han	赤穂藩	34,643	34,643	35,558	1 in Harima	1
Mikazuki-han	三日月藩	19,455	19,455	19,640	3 in Harima	2
Hayashida-han	林田藩	11,795	11,795	n.a.	1 in Harima	1
Mikusa-han	三草藩	9,371	9,371	9,353	4 in Harima	3
Ono-han	小野藩	8,146	8,146	8,167	1 in Harima	1
Anji-han	安志藩	9,812	9,812	9,386	3 in Harima	3
Yamasaki-han	山崎藩	10,247	10,247	10,410	1 in Harima	1
Tsuyama-han	津山藩	106,337	106,437	106,462	11 in Mimasaka, Shōdo-shima in Sanuki	3
Tazuta-han	鶴田藩	32,573	32,567	33,613	5 in Mimasaka	2
Mashima-han	真島藩	27,159	26,796	25,975	2 in Mimasaka	1
Okayama-han	岡山藩	358,327	358,337	350,897	8 in Bizen, 5 in Bitchū	7
Ikusaka-han	生坂藩	9,097	9,097	10,126	2 in Bitchū	2
Ashimori-han	足守藩	17,453	17,452	17,509	3 in Bitchū; 1 in Iwashiro	3
Kamogata-han	鴨方藩	27,481	27,693	27,796	3 in Bitchū	1
Niwase-han	庭瀬藩	21,502	21,502	21,886	3 in Bitchū	2
Takahashi-han	高梁藩	26,245	26,245	26,332	5 in Bitchū	1
Niimi-han	新見藩	17,278	17,278	17,179	4 in Bitchū	3
Nariwa-han	成羽藩	17,930	17,835	17,397	2 in Bitchū	1
Okada-han	岡田藩	17,472	17,465	17,480	1 in Bitchū, 1 in Mino, 1 in Settsu, 1 in Kawachi	4
Asao-han	浅尾藩	7,177	7,246	7,182	3 in Bitchū, 1 in Kawachi, 1 in Settsu	10
Fukuyama-han	福山藩	187,300	180,534	185,863	6 in Bingo; 1 in Bitchū	1
Hiroshima-ken	広島藩	914,157	514,157	914,172	8 in Aki, 8 in Bingo	1
Yamaguchi-han	山口藩	608,475	552,671	565,368	6 in Suō, 6 in Nagato	14
Iwakuni-han	岩国藩	87,635	87,951	90,393	2 in Suō	1
Tokuyama-han	徳山藩	abolished	54,479	55,853	1 in Suō; 1 in Nagato	2
Toyoura-han	豊浦藩	75,218	75,218	76,887	2 in Nagato	2
Kiyosue-han	清末藩	11,062	10,946	11,052	1 in Nagato	1
Wakayama-han	和歌山藩	528,408	528,408	540,952	7 in Kii, 8 in Ise, 1 in Yamato	6
Shingū-han	新宮藩	54,474	54,474	61,677	4 in Kii	6
Tanabe-han	田辺藩	55,076	55,076	63,103	4 in Kii	3
Tokushima-han	徳島藩	714,022	714,022	123,028	All in Awa, all in Awaji	2
Takamatsu-han	高松藩	299,223	293,775	305,197	8 in Sanuki	1
Matsuyama-han	松山藩	211,882	211,882	211,881	10 in Iyo	2
Uwajima-han	宇和島藩	169,512	169,512	169,525	1 in Iyo	1
Ōzu-han	大洲藩	104,259	104,248	97,758	4 in Iyo	3
Imabari-han	今治藩	74,994	74,994	75,102	2 in Iyo	1
Yoshida-han	吉田藩	53,913	53,913	54,160	1 in Iyo	5
Saijō-han	西条藩	58,388	58,398	61,034	3 in Iyo	1
Niiya-han	新谷藩	14,351	14,351	14,357	3 in Iyo	3
Komatsu-han	小松藩	15,165	15,165	15,155	2 in Iyo	2
Kōchi-han	高知藩	516,867	516,866	516,545	All in Tosa	1
Fukuoka-han	福岡藩	388,409	366,924	367,478	15 in Chikuzen	1
Akizuki-han	秋月藩	33,084	33,084	33,587	3 in Chikuzen	1
Kurume-han	久留米藩	262,085	262,085	241,495	8 in Chikugo	1
Yanagawa-han	柳河藩	119,708	120,180	127,323	5 in Chikugo	1
Miike-han	三池藩	9,039	9,039	9,092	1 in Chikugo, 1 in Iwashiro	2
Toyotsu-han	豊津藩	117,835	111,397	117,843	5 in Buzen	1
Nakatsu-han	中津藩	100,403	100,403	99,147	3 in Buzen, 3 in Bingo, 1 in Chikuzen	3
Chitsuka-han	千束藩	5,804	5,792	5,866	1 in Buzen	1
Oka-han	岡藩	76,404	76,404	77,581	3 in Bungo	2
Usuki-han	臼杵藩	78,244	27,923	78,986	3 in Bungo	3
Kitsuki-han	杵築藩	51,535	51,535	52,247	2 in Bungo	1
Hiji-han	日出藩	20,829	20,925	20,936	1 in Bungo	1
Funai-han	府内藩	33,224	33,224	33,326	1 in Bungo	1
Saiki-han	佐伯藩	67,554	67,550	67,687	1 in Bungo	1
Mori Domain	森藩	14,244	14,212	14,249	3 in Bungo	2
Saga-han	佐賀藩	425,762	425,762	n.a.	10 in Hizen	4
Ogi-han	小城藩	41,183	41,183	33,438	3 in Hizen	3
Shimabara-han	島原藩	175,044	174,296	175,051	1 in Hizen, 1 in Bungo, 1 in Buzen	3
Hirado-han	平戸藩	149,143	149,143	145,825	2 in Hizen, all in Iki	3
Karatsu-han	唐津藩	62,706	62,705	63,229	1 in Hizen	1
Hasunoike-han	蓮池藩	31,359	31,359	31,461	5 in Hizen	4
Ōmura-han	大村藩	125,039	122,174	120,549	2 in Hizen	2
Kashima-han	鹿島藩	13,792	13,723	13,771	1 in Hizen	2
Fukue-han	福江藩	62,275	62,056	45,747	1 in Hizen, 1 in Gotō, Hizen	1
Kumamoto-han	熊本藩	719,990	719,990	730,528	12 in Higo, 3 in Bungo	4
Hitoyoshi-han	人吉藩	53,577	53,577	54,152	1 in Higo	1
Nobeoka-han	延岡藩	122,277	122,277	125,750	5 in Hyūga	6
Obi-han	飫肥藩	48,181	48,181	48,837	2 in Hyūga	1
Sadowara-han	佐土原藩	26,420	26,420	26,755	2 in Hyūga	1
Takanabe-han	高鍋藩	43,334	43,334	43,349	5 in Hyūga	3
Kagoshima-han	鹿児島藩	896,808	772,354	896,817	All in Satsuma, all in Ōsumi, 1 in Hyūga	1
Izuhara-han	厳原藩	83,771	83,771	83,792	2 in Tsushima, 3 in Hizen, 1 in Chikuzen, 2 in Buzen	7
265 Domains (han) total		21,987,004	21,332,853	21,182,473		1,007
Nara-ken	奈良県	158,728	158,728	158,728	13 in Yamato	44
Gojō-ken	五條県	136,060	136,060	136,060	2 in Yamato, 2 in Kawachi, 2 in Kii	6
Sakai-ken	堺県	249,523	249,523	249,523	4 in Izumi, 4 in Settsu, 13 in Kawachi	40
Hyōgo-ken	兵庫県	224,124	224,124	224,124	9 in Settsu, 8 in Harima	37
Watarai-ken	度会県	92,004	92,004	96,625	8 in Ise	15
Kōfu-ken	甲府県	352,900	352,900	352,900	4 in Kai	1
Nirayama-ken	韮山県	250,708	250,708	250,603	4 in Izu, 4 in Musashi	4
Kanagawa-ken	神奈川県	421,690	421,690	421,690	4 in Musashi, 9 in Sagami	2
Urawa-ken	浦和県	280,530	280,530	280,274	6 in Musashi	11
Shinagawa-ken	品川県	188,650	188,650	188,650	5 in Musashi	6
Kosuge-ken	小菅県	162,067	16,267	162,067	4 in Musashi	1
Miyazaku-ken	宮谷県	281,077	281,077	281,077	7 in Kazusa, 2 in Shimōsa, 4 in Hitachi	15
Katsushika-ken	葛飾県	230,614	230,614	229,714	1 in Musashi, 7 in Shimōsa	14
Wakamori-ken	若森県	149,976	149,976	17,676	5 in Hitachi, 3 in Shimōsa	8
Ōtsu-ken	大津県	244,114	211,334	211,334	11 in Ōmi	24
Kasamatsu-ken	笠松県	188,139	188,139	188,139	21 in Mino	30
Takayama-ken	高山県	118,604	98,366	97,160	3 in Hida, 4 in Noto	1
Ina-ken	伊那県	193,264	188,999	189,899	2 in Shinano, 7 in Mikawa	15
Nakano-ken	中野県	183,291	n.a.	n.a.	6 in Shinano	14
Iwahana-ken	岩鼻県	358,640	358,640	358,640	13 in Kōzuke, 6 in Musashi	18
Nikkō-ken	日光県	217,588	415,706	217,588	7 in Shimotsuke	5
Shirakawa-ken	白河県	106,388	16,388	106,298	7 in Iwaki, 1 in Iwashiro	9
Kakuda-ken	角田県	83,017	83,017	83,017	4 in Iwaki, 1 in Rikuzen	1
Wakamatsu-ken	若松県	199,211	199,211	199,211	5 in Iwashiro, 1 in Echigo, 1 in Shimotsuke	1
Fukushima-ken	福島県	119,668	119,668	119,666	3 in Iwashiro	2
Tome-ken	登米県	115,874	115,874	222,518	7 in Rikuzen	1
Isawa-ken	胆沢県	138,167	138,167	138,167	2 in Rikuchū, 1 in Rikuzen	2
Esashi-ken	江刺県	237,550	237,550	n.a.	5 in Rikuchū, 1 in Rikuzen, 1 in Mutsu	2
Morioka-han	盛岡県	137,825	137,825	137,825	4 in Rikuchū	0
Yamagata-ken	山形県	318,467	331,941	32,261	3 in Uzen, 2 in Ugo	0
Hombo-ken	本保県	70,709	n.a.	n.a.	8 in Echizen	0
Kashiwazaki-ken	柏崎県	437,923	418,711	418,711	5 in Echigo	9
Niigata-ken	新潟県	259,600	259,600	259,600	2 in Echigo	2
Sado-ken	佐渡県	102,337	12,337	102,337	3 in Sado	1
Kumihama-ken	久美浜県	166,586	166,586	166,586	5 in Tango, 4 in Tamba, 6 in Tajima	64
Ikuno-ken	生野県	94,387	94,387	94,387	1 in Tajima, 1 in Tamba, 6 in Harima, 2 in Mimasaka	0
Hamada-ken	浜田県	298,126	228,863	228,863	6 in Iwami, 4 in Oki	2
Kurashiki-ken	倉敷県	237,680	237,506	214,594	11 in Bitchū, 2 in Bingo, 3 in Mimasaka, 3 districts and 3 islands in Sanuki, 5 in Iyo	33
Marugame-ken	丸亀県	135,102	135,096	134,284	5 in Sanuki, 2 in Harima, 2 in Ōmi	4
Hita-ken	日田県	195,455	195,455	195,455	7 in Bungo, 3 in Buzen, 1 in Hyūga	14
Nagasaki-ken	長崎県	267,654	265,946	264,259	3 in Hizen, 1 in Higo, 1 in Chikugo	5
40 Prefectures (ken) total		8,404,017	7,888,163	7,430,510		463
Total (except Kaitaku-shi)		31,866,389	30,697,354	30,088,335		1,478

It is quite apparent that the above demographic data contain many textual errors, but could not be corrected because the original unpublished reports preserved at the office of the Ministry of Interior of Japan were burned by a fire after the 1923 Great Kantō earthquake.

For demographic data during the Edo period, see Demographics of Japan before Meiji Restoration.

== See also ==
- Government of Japan
- Prefectures of Japan
- List of Japanese prefectures ranked by area
- List of Japanese prefectures by GDP
- List of Japanese prefectures by GDP per capita
- List of Japanese prefectures by life expectancy
- List of Japanese cities by population
- List of Provinces of Japan
- ISO 3166-2 codes for Japan
