= Kyoto machi-bugyō =

Officials of the Tokugawa shogunate in Edo period Japan

Kyoto machi-bugyō (京都町奉行) were officials of the Tokugawa shogunate in Edo period Japan. Appointments to this prominent office were usually fudai daimyō, but this was amongst the senior administrative posts open to those who were not daimyō. Conventional interpretations have construed these Japanese titles as "commissioner", "overseer" or "governor."

This bakufu title identifies a magistrate or municipal administrator with responsibility for governing and maintaining order in the shogunal city of Kyoto.

The Kyoto machi-bugyō were the central public authorities in this significant urban center. These men were bakufu-appointed officials fulfilling a unique role. They were an amalgam of chief of police, judge, and mayor. The machi-bugyō were expected to manage a full range of administrative and judicial responsibilities. As in Edo, there were two bugyō-sho offices in Kyoto, higashi machi-bugyō-sho on the east and nishi machi-bugyō-sho on the west of the city; in Kyoto they were called higashi o-yakusho and nishi o-yakusho. In Kyoto as well as in Edo they worked on a monthly rotating schedule. The duties of Kyoto machi-bugyō had been administered by Osaka gundai before 1669, when machi-bugyō system was introduced to Kyoto under the supervision of Kyoto shoshidai.

Each machi-bugyō was involved in tax collection, policing, and firefighting; and at the same time, each played a number of judicial roles –- hearing and deciding both ordinary civil cases and criminal cases.

In this period, the machi-bugyō were considered equal in status to the minor daimyō. At any one time, there were as many as 16 machi-bugyō located throughout Japan; and there was always at least one in Kyoto.

== Shogunal city ==
During this period, Kyoto ranked with the largest urban centers, some of which were designated as a "shogunal city." The number of such cities rose from three to eleven under Tokugawa administration. All three cities, Kyoto, Osaka and Sumpu had machi-bugyō. Other major "shogunal cities", or shogun chokkatsu-ryō had ongoku bugyō or bugyō to remote "shogunal cities"; from north to south, Hakodate, Niigata, Sado, Nikkō, Kanagawa, Uraga, Shimoda, Yamada, Nara, Fushimi, Sakai, Hyōgo and Nagasaki. Fushimi bugyō was appointed from daimyō, and those for other "shogunal cities" was hatamoto.

== List of Kyoto machi-bugyō ==
=== Higashi machi-bugyō ===
- Miyazaki Shigenari, 1665–1673.
- Nagai Naomune, 1862–1864.
- Ikeda Nagaoki, 1863.

=== Nishi machi-bugyō ===
- Amemiya Masatane, 1665–1671.

== See also ==
- Bugyō
