= Sakuji-bugyō =

Sakuji-bugyō (作事奉行) were officials of the Tokugawa shogunate having responsibility for architecture and construction matters.

Appointments to this prominent office were usually fudai daimyōs. Conventional interpretations have construed these Japanese titles as "commissioner" or "overseer".

The office was created on the 3rd day of the 10th month of the ninth year of Kan'ei (1632). Three sakuji-bugyō were appointed at the same time in an effort to tighten administrative controls over what had previously been an ad hoc army of builders in a diverse array of trades, and in a sense, the appointments could be seen as a response to a number of things which had not gone well in other, earlier construction projects.

The three loyal Tokugawa retainers were to become responsible for a number of shogunate building projects in the 1630s. The sakuji-bugyō was considered to rank approximately with the kanjō-bugyō and machi-bugyō.

== List of sakuji-bugyō ==
- Sakuma Sanekatsu
- Kano Motokatsu
- Sakai Tadatomo
- Kurihara Murikazu

== See also ==
- Bugyō
