= Bugyō =

Type of official in Old Japan

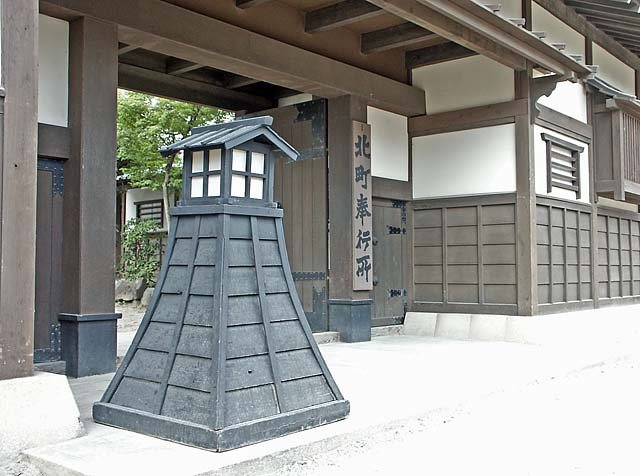
Reconstruction of the residence of the North Edo machi-bugyō in present-day Tokyo.

Bugyō (奉行) was a title assigned to samurai officials in feudal Japan. Bugyō is often translated as commissioner, magistrate, or governor, and other terms would be added to the title to describe more specifically a given official's tasks or jurisdiction.

== Pre-Edo period ==
In the Heian period (794–1185), the post or title of bugyō would be applied only to an official with a set task; once that task was complete, the officer would cease to be called bugyō. However, in the Kamakura period (1185–1333) and later, continuing through the end of the Edo period (1603–1868), posts and titles came to be created on a more permanent and regular basis. Over time, there came to be 36 bugyō in the bureaucracy of the Kamakura shogunate.

In 1434, Ashikaga Yoshinori established the Tosen-bugyō to regulate foreign affairs for the Ashikaga shogunate.

In 1587, a Japanese invading army occupied Seoul; one of Toyotomi Hideyoshi's first acts was to create a bugyō for the city, replicating a familiar pattern in an unfamiliar setting.

== Edo period ==
During the Edo period, the number of bugyō reached its largest extent as the bureaucracy of the Tokugawa shogunate expanded on an ad hoc basis, responding to perceived needs and changing circumstances.

=== List ===
- Edo machi-bugyō (江戸町奉行) – Magistrates or municipal administrators of Edo.
  - Kita-machi-bugyō (北町奉行) – North Edo magistrate.
  - Minami-machi-bugyō (南町奉行) – South Edo magistrate.
- Fushin-bugyō (普請奉行) – Superintendents of Public Works.
- Gaikoku-bugyō (外国奉行) – Commissioners in charge of trade and diplomatic relations with foreign countries after 1858.
- Gunkan-bugyō (軍鑑奉行) – Commissioners in charge of naval matters (post-1859).
- Gusoku-bugyō (具足奉行) – Commissioners in charge of supplying the shogunal armies.
  - Bugu-bugyō (武具奉行) – Commissioners in charge of supplying the shogunal armies (post-1863), replaced Gusoku-bugyō.
- Hakodate bugyō (箱館奉行) – Overseers of the port of Hakodate and neighboring territory of Ezo.
- Haneda bugyō (羽田奉行) – Overseers of the port of Haneda; commissioners of coastal defenses near Edo (post-1853).
- Hyōgo bugyō (兵庫奉行) – Overseers of the port of Hyōgo (post-1864).
- Jisha-bugyō (寺社奉行) – Ministers or administrators for religious affairs; overseers of the country's temples and shrines.
- Jiwari-bugyō (地割奉行)- Commissioners of surveys and surveying.
- Kanagawa bugyō (神奈川奉行) – Overseers of the port of Kanagawa (post-1859).
- Kanjō-bugyō (勘定奉行) – Ministers or administrators for shogunal finance (post-1787).
  - Gundai (郡代)– Deputies.
  - Daikan (代官)- Deputies.
  - Kane-bugyō (金奉行) – Superintendents of the Treasury.
  - Kura-bugyō (倉庫奉行) – Superintendents of Cereal Stores.
  - Kinza (金座) – Gold za or monopoly office (post-1595).
  - Ginza (銀座) – Silver za or monopoly office (post-1598).
  - Dōza (銅座) – Copper za or monopoly office (post-1636) and (1701–1712, 1738–1746, 1766–1768).
  - Shuza (朱座) – Cinnabar za or monopoly office (post-1609).
- Kanjō-ginmiyaku – Comptrollers of Finance.
- Kantō gundai – Kantō deputies.
- Kinzan-bugyō (金山奉行) – Commissioners of mines.
- Kyoto shoshidai (京都所司代) -- Shogunal representatives at Kyoto.
  - Kyoto machi-bugyō (京都町奉行) – Magistrates or municipal administrators of Kyoto.
  - Fushimi bugyō (伏見奉行) – Magistrates or municipal administrators of Fushimi (post-1620).
  - Nara bugyō (奈良奉行) – Governors of Nara.
- Machi-bugyō (町奉行) – Magistrates or municipal administrators in shogunal cities: Edo, Kyoto, Nagasaki, Nara, Nikkō, and Osaka.
- Nagasaki bugyō (長崎奉行) – Governor of Nagasaki.
- Niigata bugyō (新潟奉行) – Overseers of the port of Niigata.
- Nikkō bugyō (日光奉行) – Overseers of Nikkō.
- Osaka jōdai (大阪城代) – Overseers of Osaka Castle.
  - Osaka machi-bugyō (大阪町奉行) – Magistrates or municipal administrators in shogunal cities like Osaka.
  - Sakai bugyō (堺奉行) – Overseers of the town of Sakai.
- Rōya-bugyō (牢屋奉行) – Commissioners of the shogunal prison.
- Sado bugyō (佐渡奉行) – Overseers of the island of Sado.
- Sakuji-bugyō (作事奉行) – Commissioners of works (post-1632).
- Shimoda bugyō (下田奉行) – Overseers of the port of Shimoda.
- Sumo-bugyō (相撲奉行) – Ancestors of the function of gyōji. Officials during the Kamakura shogunate in charge of refereeing sumo matches at the imperial court.
- Sunpu jōdai (駿府城代) – Overseers of Sunpu Castle.
- Uraga bugyō (浦賀奉行) – Overseers of the port of Uraga.
- Yamada bugyō (山田奉行) -- Representatives of the shogunate at Ise.
- Zaimoku-ishi bugyō (材木石奉行) - Overseer of construction materials for the Shōgun's properties (from 1647)
- Zen bugyō (膳奉行) – Overseer of victuals for the Shōgun's table

== Meiji period ==
In the early years of the Meiji Restoration, the title of bugyō continued to be used for government offices and conventional practices where nothing else had been created to replace the existing Tokugawa system. For example, the commander-in-chief of artillery under the early Meiji government was called the Hohei-bugyō. As the new government passed its numerous reforms, the term bugyō was soon phased out of usage.

== See also ==
- Shugo
- Go-Bugyō
