= Ryōsen-ji =

Coordinates: 34°40′20″N 138°56′30″E

- 了仙寺
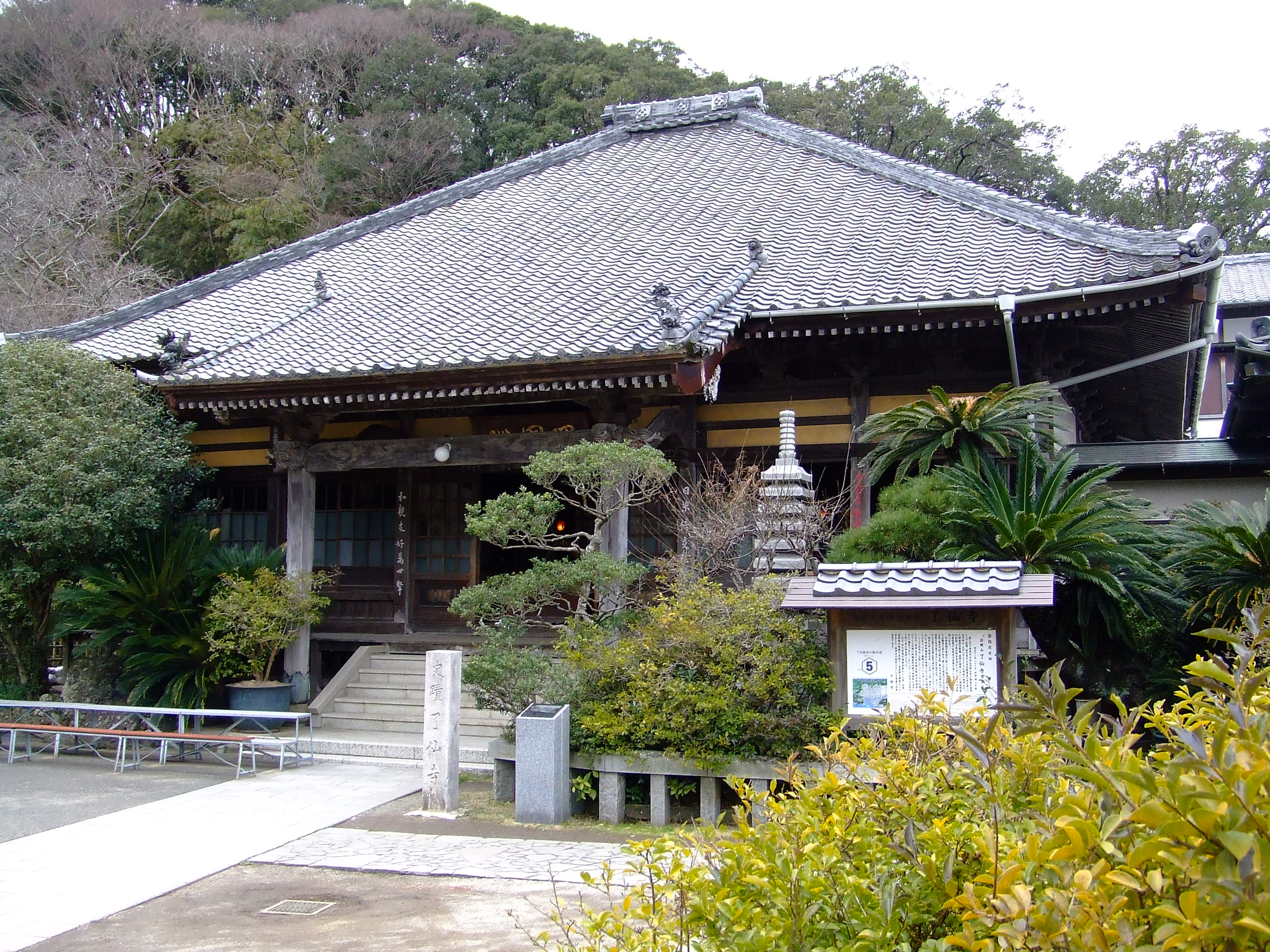
- Ryōsen-ji

- Ryōsen-ji Ryōsen-ji (Japan)

Religion
- Affiliation: Buddhist
- Rite: Nichiren sect

Location
- Location: Shichigen-chō 3-chōme, Shimoda-shi, Shizuoka
- Country: Japan
- Interactive map of Ryōsen-ji

Architecture
- Founder: Nitchō
- Completed: 1635

Website
- www.izu.co.jp/~ryosenji/

Ryōsen-ji (了仙寺) is a Nichiren-sect Buddhist temple in the city of Shimoda, Japan.

== History ==
Ryōsen-ji was founded in 1635 by the prelate Nitchō, with the support and patronage of 2nd Shimoda bugyō Imamura Masanaga and was later rebuilt in 1826. The Hondō was again reconstructed in 1945. Three large Gorintō stone monuments on the grounds (the graves of a number of the Shimoda bugyō) are designated as Shimoda City historic monuments.

During the visit of Commodore Matthew Calbraith Perry to Shimoda in 1854 in one of the initial attempts by the United States to end the national isolation policy of the Japanese government, the temple was designated as his shore residence. Currently, the road from Ryōsen-ji to the port, which Perry and his men must have used during their stay, is named “Perry Road”, and there are a records that Perry held military parade-style reviewing ceremonies for this men in the precincts of the temple. The military band which accompanied Perry's squadron also performed occasionally in the grounds of this time, making it the site of the first Western music concert in Japan. William Heine, a German painter who accompanied the Perry Expedition, made a lithograph of one of these events, a copy of which is displayed at Ryōsen-ji.

Adjacent to the temple is The Museum of Black Ship (MoBS黒船ミュージアム), which displays a number of artifacts related to Commodore Perry, the Black Ships, and contact between Japan and the West. In recent years, the temple has also been noted for the profusion of jasmine flowers in its gardens. The temple is a ten-minute walk from Shimoda Station.

== See also ==
- List of Historic Sites of Japan (Shizuoka)
