= Jiwari =

Jiwari may refer to:

- Jivari, a buzzing sound found in Indian musical tradition
- Jiwari-bugyō, officials in Edo period Japan
