= Daikan =

Japanese historical magistrate

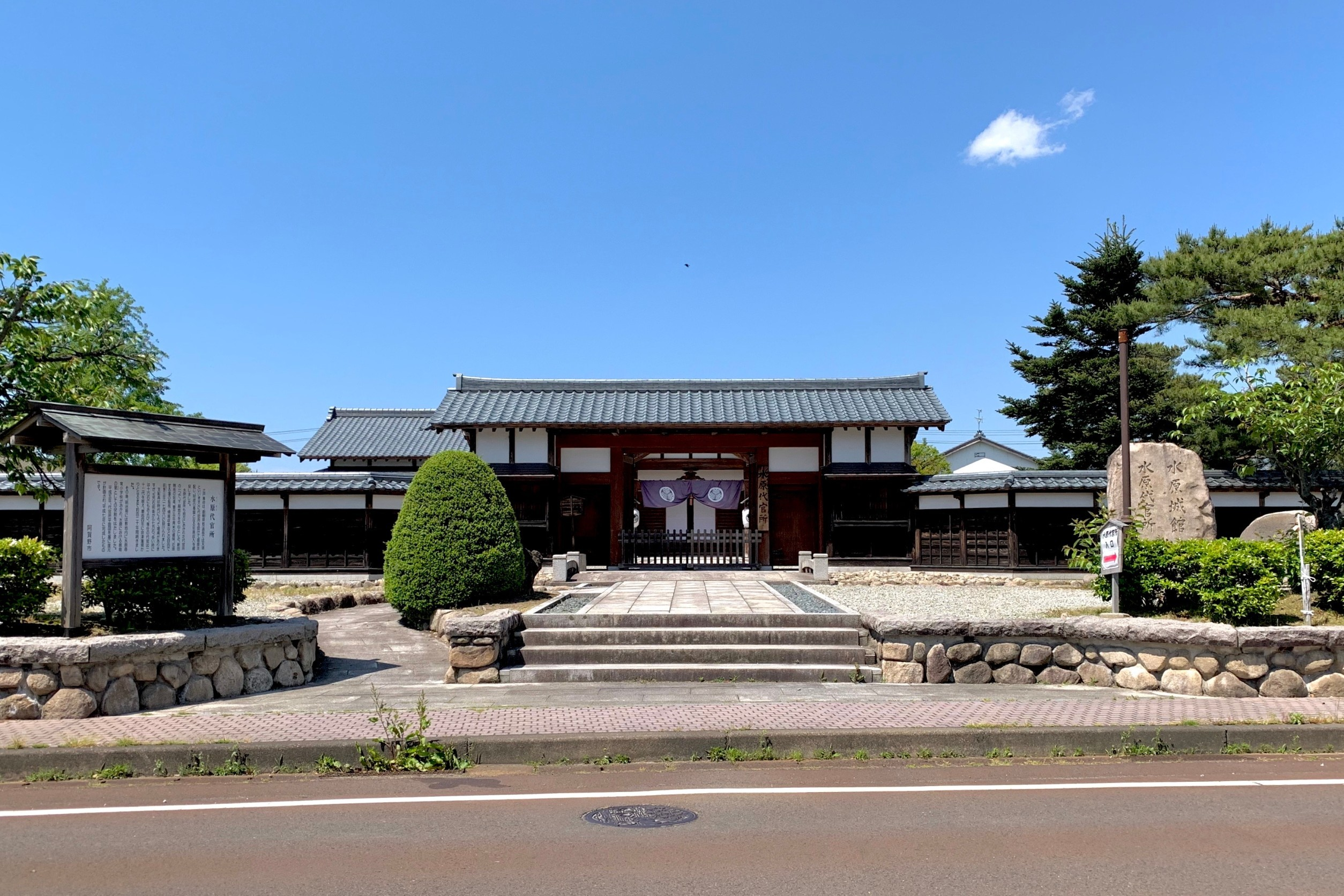
A former daikan's office, the Suibara Daikansho in Agano, Niigata Prefecture

Daikan (代官) was an official in ancient Japan who was in charge of administrative duties on behalf of a lord or a ruler. Since the Middle Ages, daikan oversaw a territory and territorial tax collection. In the Edo period, daikan were local governors in charge of the government and security of domain and shogunate territories.

== History ==
=== Middle Ages ===
In the Middle Ages, azukaridokoro and ukesho referred to daikan of a feudal and shōen lord, and shugo-dai and jitō-dai referred to daikan of shugo and jitō governors, respectively. In the Azuchi-Momoyama period, territorial rulers in charge of local tax collection were called daikan.

=== Edo period ===
In the Edo period, high-ranking hatamoto retainers of the shogun were appointed daikan to govern the shogunal demesne (天領) across Japan and were given a 50,000-100,000 koku territory as their own fief. The daikan worked from their administrative headquarters (jin'ya) at their territory or their mansion in Edo, under the Commissioner of Finance (kanjō bugyō), and had a dozen of tetsuki and tedai officials under their service. Hereditary succession of the position was common. In 1867, at the end of the Edo period, there were 37 daikan.

Daikan who had a bad reputation for self-interest were dismissed by the shogunate, as the harsh collection of annual taxation led to the escape of farmers, which in turn reduced the amount of collectable taxation. Some of them were dismissed and punished for causing starvation during famines. On the other hand, other daikan gained a great reputation, such as Suzuki Shigenari, who continued to appeal to the shogunate for a reduction or exemption of annual taxation at the cost of his own life in order to save the people of the domain from heavy taxes, and Ido Masaaki, who also saved the people from famine by introducing ganzo to the territories under his control.

In the latter half of the Edo period, the feudal domains or vassals of the Tokugawa Shogunate followed the shogunal example and appointed their own daikan, district magistrates, who were called gun-dai or kōri bugyō.
