= Gunkan-bugyō =

Edo period Japanese officials

Gunkan-bugyō (軍鑑奉行), also known as kaigun-bugō, were officials of the Tokugawa shogunate in Edo period Japan. Appointments to this prominent office were usually fudai daimyō. Conventional interpretations have construed these Japanese titles as "commissioner", "overseer," or "governor".

This bakufu title identifies an official with responsibility for naval matters. The office was created on March 28, 1859. The creation of this new position was an administrative change which was deemed necessary because of two treaties which were negotiated with the Americans. The open port provisions were part of the Convention of Kanagawa of 1858, which cam about as the result Commodore Perry's second appearance in Tokyo harbor with armed battleships. More precisely, this bugyō was considered essential because of the Treaty of Amity and Commerce, which had been negotiated in 1858 by the American representative, Townsend Harris—the Harris Treaty of 1858).

The gunkan-bugyō was considered to rank approximately with the kanjō-bugyō.

The genesis of the gunkan-bugyō pre-dates the actual creation of the office.

== Kaibō-gakari ==
The prefix kaibō-gakari meaning "in charge of maritime defense" was used with the titles of some bakufu officials after 1845. This term was used to designate those who bore a special responsibility for overseeing coastal waters, and by implication, for dealing with matters involving foreigners—for example, kaibō-gakari-ōmetsuke which later came to be superseded by the term gaikoku-gakari.

== List of gunkan-bugyō ==
- Mizuno Tadanori (1859).
- Nagai Naomune, (1859).
- Inoue Kyuonao (1859–1862).
- Oguri Tadamasa (1865).
- Enomoto Takeaki – kaigun-bugyō (1866–1868).
- Katsu Kaishū
- Kimura Kaishū (1860–1865, 1866–1868)

== See also ==
- Bugyō
