= Fushin bugyō =

Fushin-bugyō (普請奉行) were officials of the Tokugawa shogunate in Edo period Japan. Appointments to this prominent office were usually fudai daimyō. Conventional interpretations have construed these Japanese titles as "commissioner" or "overseer."

This bakufu tile identifies an official with responsibility for public works—for construction projects which involved civil engineering like land reclamation projects, for excavation of moats and canals, and for the collection of stone and the erection of castle walls. As a result of the experiences involved in castle building in the Momoyama period and early-Edo period, Tokugawa architectural practice, such as the construction of the mausoleum complex at Nikkō, was seen as a subordinate to the massive task of wall building which was seen as an essential security measure in troubled times. This position was made permanent in 1652.

== Sakuji-bugyō created in 1632 ==
In response to the perceived importance of the wall-building and moat-dredging work of the fushin-bugyō, the position of sakuji-bugyō was created in 1632 as part of an effort to tighten administrative controls over other construction activities in what had previously been an ad hoc army of builders in a diverse array of trades

== List of fushin-bugyō ==
- Fukushima Tamemoto.

== See also ==
- Zeniya Gohei

== See also ==
- bugyō
