= Kura-bugyō =

Kura-bugyō (倉庫奉行) were officials of the Tokugawa shogunate with responsibility for supervising cereal storehouses and accounting for rice received in payment of imposed taxes.

The manner of paying taxes varied according to locality. In the Kantō, payments were generally made in rice for wet fields and in gold for uplands. In the Kinai and western provinces, a slightly different formula was applied; but the payments were also received in both rice and gold. In the case of rice payments, the money would have been taken to Edo, to Kyoto or to Osaka where it would be placed in shogunate storehouses which were under the control and supervision of the kura-bugyo.

== See also ==
- Bugyō
