= Kane-bugyō =

Officials of the Japanese Tokugawa shogunate

Kane-bugyō (金奉行) were officials of the Tokugawa shogunate with responsibility for financial accounting or tax administration.

The manner of paying taxes varied according to locality. In the Kantō, payments were generally made in rice for wet fields and in gold for uplands. In the Kinai and western provinces, a slightly different formula was applied; but the payments were also received in both rice and gold. In the case of cash payments, the money would have been taken to Edo Castle or to Osaka Castle where it became the responsibility of kane-bugyō.

The kane-bugyō in Edo and Osaka were responsible for all accounts associated with such receipts of cash. These were compiled and then subsequently audited by the katte-kata. The entire operation was closely scrutinized by a member of the rōjū or the wakadoshiyori.

Some domains also had the position of kane-bugyō. Two of the Forty-seven rōnin had held this position in the Akō Domain: Ōtaka Gengo and Maehara Isuke.

== See also ==
- Bugyō
