= Nikkō bugyō =

Nikkō bugyō (日光奉行) were officials of the Tokugawa shogunate in Edo period Japan. Appointments to this prominent office were usually fudai daimyō, but this was amongst the senior administrative posts open to those who were not daimyō. Conventional interpretations have construed these Japanese titles as "commissioner" or "overseer" or "governor."

Nikkō houses the mausoleum of shōgun Tokugawa Ieyasu (Nikkō Tōshō-gū) and that of his grandson Iemitsu (Iemitsu-byō Taiyū-in), as well as the Futarasan Shrine, which dates to the year 767 and the temple of Rinnō-ji, which was established in 782. The shrine of Nikkō Tōshō-gū was completed in 1617 and became a major draw of visitors to the area during the Edo period. A number of new roads were built during this time to provide easier access to Nikkō from surrounding regions.

This bakufu tile identifies an official responsible for administration of the area which encompasses the Tōshō-gū mountain temple complex at Nikkō. The numbers of men holding the title concurrently would vary over time.

== Shogunal city ==
During this period, Nikkō ranked with the largest urban centers, some of which were designated as a "shogunal city". The number of such cities rose from three to eleven under Tokugawa administration.

== List of Nikkō bugyō ==
- Kan'o Haruhide (d. 1746), simultaneously kanjō bugyō (1737–53).

== See also ==
- Bugyō
