= Gusoku-bugyō =

Japanese shogunate government office

The Gusoku bugyō (具足奉行) was a government office under Japan's Tokugawa shogunate, concerned with the armament of the shōgun's soldiers.

The office was established in 1604; however, this office was known as bugu-bugyō after 1863.
