= Haneda bugyō =

Officials of the Tokugawa shogunate in Japan

Haneda bugyō (羽田奉行) were officials of the Tokugawa shogunate in Edo period Japan. Conventional interpretations have construed these Japanese titles as "commissioner," "overseer," or "governor." This office was created in 1842. This bakufu title identifies an official responsible for the administration of the port of Haneda and foreign trade in the area. The number of men holding the title concurrently would vary over time.

In February 1854, Commodore Matthew C. Perry sailed unimpeded into Edo harbor and anchored his American squadron of ships off the port of Haneda.

== See also ==
- Bugyō
