= Osaka machi-bugyō =

Officials of the Tokugawa shogunate

Osaka machi-bugyō (大阪町奉行, Osaka machi-bugyō) were officials of the Tokugawa shogunate in Edo period Japan. Appointments to this prominent office were usually fudai daimyō, but this was amongst the senior administrative posts open to those who were not daimyō. Conventional interpretations have construed these Japanese titles as "commissioner" or "overseer" or "governor".

Under the control of Rōjū, this bakufu title identifies a magistrate or municipal administrator with responsibility for governing and maintaining order in the shogunal city of Osaka, Settsu Province, and Kawachi Province.

The Osaka machi-bugyō were the central public authorities in this significant urban center. These men were bakufu-appointed officials fulfilling a unique role. They were an amalgam of chief of police, judge, and mayor. The machi-bugyō were expected to manage a full range of administrative and judicial responsibilities.

Each machi-bugyo was involved in tax collection, policing, and firefighting; and at the same time, each played a number of judicial roles – hearing and deciding both ordinary civil cases and criminal cases. Each machi-bugyo worked by relay, changing on duty and off duty monthly. Machi-bugyo which is on duty accept new tasks. Another machi-bugyō which is off duty does not accept new tasks, but still working to deal with tasks which had been accepted. By this alternation system, bakufu let two bugyos watch each other, and decentralized the massive power of machi-bugyo, therefore prevented injustice.

In this period, the machi-bugyo were considered equal in status to the minor daimyō. At any one time, there were as many as 16 machi-bugyō located throughout Japan; and there was always at least one in Osaka.

== Shogunal city ==
During this period, Osaka ranked with the largest urban centers, some of which were designated as a "shogunal city". The number of such cities rose from three to eleven under Tokugawa administration.

== List of Osaka machi-bugyō ==
=== Higashimachi-bugyō ===
- 34th - Kawaji Toshiaki, 1851-1852.

=== Nishimachi--bugyō ===
- 11th - Ōkubo Tadakata(1704-1708).

== See also ==
- Bugyō
