= Jiwari-bugyō =

Jiwari-bugyō (地割奉行) were officials of the Tokugawa shogunate in Edo period Japan.

This bakufu title identifies an official with responsibility for surveying land.

== List of jiwari-bugyō ==
- Tagame Morishige.

== See also ==
- Bugyō
