= Yamada bugyō =

Yamada bugyō (山田奉行) were officials of the Tokugawa shogunate with responsibilities as an official representatives of the shogunate in Ise.

Conventional interpretations have construed these Japanese titles as "commissioner", "overseer" or "governor".

== List of Yamada bugyō ==
The Tokugawa placed a bugyō at Ise, also known as Ujiyamada; and the main function of this official was to supervise pilgrims and shrines in the area; and these bakufu officials served as a magistrates for resolving civil disputes, amongst other duties.

- Inoue Shūen.
- Inoue Hachirōbei, 1609.
- Ōoka Tadasuke, 1717.

== See also ==
- Bugyō
