= Edo machi-bugyō =

Edo machi-bugyō (江戸町奉行) were magistrates or municipal administrators with responsibility for governing and maintaining order in the shogunal city of Edo. Machi-bugyō were samurai officials of the Tokugawa shogunate in Edo period Japan. Appointments to this prominent office were usually hatamoto, this was amongst the senior administrative posts open to those who were not daimyōs. Conventional interpretations have construed these Japanese titles as "commissioner", "overseer" or "governor."

During the Edo period, there were generally two hatamoto serving simultaneously as Edo machi-bugyō. There were two Edo machi-bugyō-sho within the jurisdictional limits of metropolitan Edo; and during the years from 1702 though 1719, there was also a third appointed machi-bugyō.

The Edo machi-bugyō were the central public authorities in this significant urban center. These men were bakufu-appointed officials fulfilling a unique role. They were an amalgam of chief of police, judge, and mayor. The machi-bugyō were expected to manage a full range of administrative and judicial responsibilities.

Each machi-bugyō was involved in tax collection, policing, and firefighting; and at the same time, each played a number of judicial roles—hearing and deciding both ordinary civil cases and criminal cases.

In this period, the machi-bugyō were considered equal in status to the minor daimyōs. At any one time, there were as many as 16 machi-bugyō located throughout Japan, and there were always two in Edo.

== Shogunal city ==
During this period, Edo ranked with the largest urban centers, some of which were designated as a "shogunal city". The number of such cities rose from three to eleven under Tokugawa administration.

In Edo, a special system was devised to mitigate the possibility of municipal corruption. Initially, there were three machi-bugyō and then the number was reduced to one. The system of two Edo machi-bugyō was established in the early Edo period, rather than simply being an increase to two under Shōgun Iemitsu. Except for the period from 1702 to 1719, when a third machi-bugyō was appointed, the two-machi-bugyō system remained the standard arrangement until the end of the shogunate. There were two chief officials with equal powers and responsibilities; and each would alternately take control for one month before relinquishing the office to their counterpart. The two machi-bugyō operated from separate offices, the Kita-machi-bugyō-sho and Minami-machi-bugyō-sho. In 1719, the temporary third machi-bugyō office was abolished, restoring the two-office system. Kodenmachō(小伝馬町)

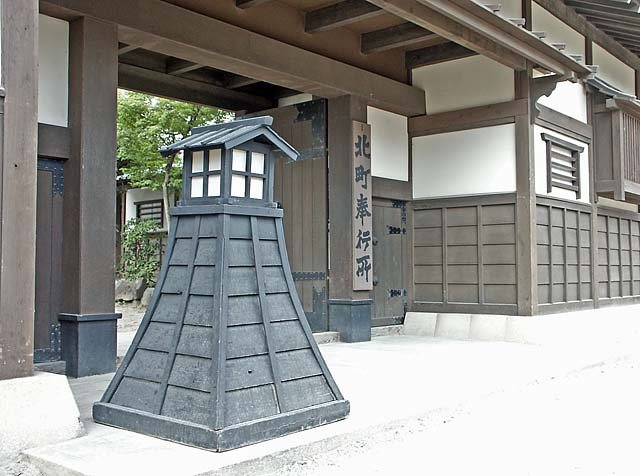
Reconstruction of the entrance to the Kita-mach-bugyō-sho, an impression of the way it might have appeared

=== Kita-machi-bugyō ===
Edo's north magistrate was called the Kita-machi-bugyō (北'町奉行, kita-machi-bugyō), so-called because his official residence was physically to the north of the official location of his counterpart, the minami-machi-bugyō.

=== Minami-machi-bugyō ===
Edo's south magistrate was called the Minami-machi-bugyō (南町奉行, minami-machi-bugyō), so called because his official residence was physically to the south of the official location of his counterpart, the kita-machi-bugyō. In 1707, the Tokugawa shogunate established the Minami-machi Bugyō-sho, the office of one of the magistrates of Edo, in this area of modern Yūrakuchō.

- Ōoka Tadasuke, Ōoka Echizen-no-kami Tadasuke

=== Honjo-machi-bugyō ===
Edo's third magistrate was called the Honjo-machi-bugyō (本所町奉行, honjo-machi-bugyō), who was responsible for the neighborhoods of Honjo and Fukagawa on the east bank of the Sumida River. A third machi-bugyō was deemed necessary in the years between 1702 through 1719.

== List of Edo machi-bugyō ==
- Amano Saburobei Yasukage.
- Itakura Katsushige.
- Ōoka Tadasuke
- Tōyama Kagemoto.
- Yoda Masatsugu (1753).
- Nanbu Toshimi (1753).

== See also ==
- Bugyō
