= Shimoda bugyō =

Shimoda bugyō (下田奉行) were officials of the Tokugawa shogunate These bakufu appointees were responsible for administration of the port of Shimoda and foreign trade in the area.

This office was created in 1842, and it was held by two fudai daimyō who were appointed concurrently. At any given time, one would normally be in residence at Shimoda, and the other would be in Edo as part of an alternating pattern. Conventional interpretations have construed these Japanese titles as "commissioner" or "overseer" or "governor".

The number of men holding the title concurrently varied over time, fluctuating from as few as five in 1859 to as many as nine.

== List of Shimoda bugyō ==
- Toki Yorimune, 1843–1844.
- Izawa Masayoshi, 1854–1855.
- Inoue Kiyonao, 1855–1859.

== See also ==
- Bugyō
