= Hyōgo bugyō =

Hyōgo bugyō (兵庫奉行) were officials of the Tokugawa shogunate in Amagasaki Domain, during the Edo period of Japan. Appointments to this prominent office were usually fudai daimyō, but this was amongst the senior administrative posts open to those who were not daimyō. Conventional interpretations have construed these Japanese titles as "commissioner", "overseer" or "governor".

== History ==
The port at Hyōgo was originally known as the Ōwada anchorage (大輪田泊, Ōwada-no-tomari), as described in the Nihon Shoki and other records describing the founding of the Ikuta Shrine by Empress Jingū in 201 AD. For most of its history, this coastal area was not a single political entity. During the Edo period, the eastern parts of present-day Kobe came under the jurisdiction of the Amagasaki Domain and the western parts were encompassed within the Akashi Domain, and the center was controlled directly by the Tokugawa shogunate.

This bakufu title identifies an official responsible for administration of that port area at Hyōgo (modern Kobe). The office was created in December 1864; and initially there was only one bugyō until the position was allowed to lapse in December 1865. In 1867, the office was restored; and thereafter, there were always two bugyō.

During this period, Hyogo came to rank with the largest urban centers, some of which were designated as a "shogunal city". The number of such cities rose from three to eleven under Tokugawa administration.

== List of Hyōgo bugyō ==
- Shibata Takenada (1868).

== See also ==
- Bugyō
