= Niigata bugyō =

Niigata bugyō (新潟奉行) were officials of the Tokugawa shogunate in Edo period Japan. Appointments to this prominent office were usually fudai daimyōs, but this was amongst the senior administrative posts open to those who were not daimyōs. Conventional interpretations have construed these Japanese titles as "commissioner" or "overseer" or "governor".

The city of Niigata is the largest city in what was once Echigo Province. It lies on the northwest coast of Honshū, the largest island of Japan. The port on the Sea of Japan faces west towards Sado Island. In 1858, Niigata was designated as one of the five ports to be opened for international trade in the Treaty of Amity and Commerce between Japan and the United States; however, the shallow water level in the port delayed the actual opening to foreign ships until 1869.

This bakufu tile identifies an official responsible for administration of the port city of Niigata. The numbers of men holding the title concurrently would vary over time.

== See also ==
- Bugyō
