= Nara bugyō =

Nara bugyō (奈良奉行) were officials of the Tokugawa shogunate in Edo period Japan. Appointments to this prominent office were usually fudai daimyōs, but this was amongst the senior administrative posts open to those who were not daimyōs. Conventional interpretations have construed these Japanese titles as "commissioner" or "overseer" or "governor".

This bakufu tile identifies an official responsible for administration of the pre-Heian capital city of Nara. The numbers of men holding the title concurrently would vary over time.

== Shogunal city ==
During this period, Nara ranked with the largest urban centers, some of which were designated as a "shogunal city". The number of such cities rose from three to eleven under Tokugawa administration.

== See also ==
- bugyō
