= Sakai bugyō =

Sakai bugyō (堺奉行) were officials of the Tokugawa shogunate in Edo period Japan. Appointments to this prominent office were usually fudai daimyōs. Conventional interpretations have construed these Japanese titles as "commissioner", "overseer" or "governor".

Sakai is located on the edge of Osaka Bay and at the mouth of the Yamato River, which connected the Yamato Province (now Nara Prefecture) to the sea. Sakai had been a significant trade center in the Muromachi period, and this trading nexus continued to be important during the Edo period; however, during this time-frame, Sakai's merchants focused on in inland trade because of the Sakoku policy which prohibited all contact with foreigners except through the island of Dejima in Nagasaki harbor.

This bakufu title identifies an official responsible for administration of the city of Sakai.

== List of Sakai bugyō ==
- Hasegawa Fujihiro, 1615.

== See also ==
- Bugyō
- Sakai incident
