= Kanjō bugyō =

Officials of the Tokugawa shogunate in Edo period Japan

Kanjō-bugyō (勘定奉行) were officials of the Tokugawa shogunate in Edo period Japan. Appointments to this prominent office were usually fudai daimyōs. Conventional interpretations have construed these Japanese titles as "commissioner" or "overseer" or "governor".

The work was mainly done at the account office.

This bakufu title identifies an official with responsibility for finance. The office of kanjō-bugyō was created in 1787 to upgrade the status and authority of the pre-1787 finance chief (kanjō-gashira).

It was a high-ranking office, in status roughly equivalent to a gaikoku-bugyō; the status of this office ranked slightly below that of daimyō, ranking a little below the machi-bugyō. The number of kanjō bugyō varied, usually five or six in the late Tokugawa period.

The kanjō-bugyō was considered to rank approximately with the gunkan-bugyō. The kanjō-ginmiyaku were bakufu officials of lower rank who were subordinate to the kanjō-bugyō.

== Clans ==
There are also accounts in various Domains, and like the accounts of the shogunate, they were in charge of duties such as finance and tax collection of the domains. The chief executive officer of the Accounts Office is the Kanjo Bugyo, and because of the domain's financial responsibilities, a superior with a relatively upper class samurai was appointed within the clan . In addition, there was an official of the accountant under the Kanjō bugyō, who was in charge of the duties.

== List of kanjō-bugyō ==
- Umezo Masagake
- Matsudaira Chikanao (1844–57).
- Kawaji Toshiaki (1852–58)—negotiated the Shimoda Treaty.
- Mizuno Tadanori (1855–58, 1859).
- Toki Tomoaki (1857–59).
- Nagai Naomune (1858).
- Takenuchi Tasunori (1861–64).
- Oguri Tadamasa (1863, 1864–65).
- Matsuaira Yasunao (1863–64).
- Inoue Kiyonao (1864–66).
- Kawazu Sukekuni (1867).
- Kurimoto Sebei (1867).
- Kan'o Haruhide. Simultaneously Nikkō bugyō until 1746.
- Honda Yashuhide.
- Hagiwara Shigehide.

== See also ==
- Bugyō
- Head of Accounts(勘定組頭) - Who directed and supervised the officials belonging to the Accounts Office.and was in charge of the Shogunate or Domains finances and agricultural policy.
- Kanjō-bugyō - Kanjobugyo is a financial accounting computer software released by Obic Business Consultants.
