= Shimokō Site =

Shimokō ruins
- 下国府遺跡 (Japanese)
- Sado Kokufu ruins Shimokō Site (Japan)
- 37°58′35″N 138°21′53″E
- Periods: Heian period
- Location: Sado, Niigata, Japan
- Region: Hokuriku region

Site notes
- Public access: Yes (no public facilities)

The Shimokō ruins (下国府遺跡, Shimokō iseki) is an archaeological site with the ruins of what appears to be a Heian period government administrative complex located in the Takeda neighborhood of the city of Sado, Niigata prefecture in the northern Hokuriku region of Japan.The site has been protected as a National Historic Site from 1976.

== Overview ==
In the late Nara period, after the establishment of a centralized government under the Ritsuryō system, local rule over the provinces was standardized under a kokufu (provincial capital), and each province was divided into smaller administrative districts, known as (郡, gun, kōri), composed of 2–20 townships in 715 AD. The kokufu complex contained the official residence and offices of the kokushi, the official sent from the central government as provincial governor, along with buildings housing offices concerned with general administration, farming, finance, police and military. In the periphery there was a provincial school (kokugaku), the garrison and storehouses for taxes.

The Shimokō ruins are located on Sado island, at the tip of a tongue-shaped plateau protruding from the Kosado Mountains into the Kuninaka Plain. An archaeological excavation in 1975 confirmed that the site was a compound protected by two concentric moats, containing the foundations for at least two buildings with foundation pillars set directly into the ground. The outer moat has a width of 1.4 meters and is 36 meters long in the north and south, and 32 meters long in the east and west. The inner moat is a narrow groove with a width of only 0.2 to 0.7 meters. The site contained a large number of shards of Sue ware pottery and roof tiles, along with everyday items such as cups, which have been dated to the 9th century.

Although the details of the ruins is unknown, the location of the site corresponds to a site labelled kokufu in a 17th-century document, and it is also located near the ruins of the Sado Kokubun-ji.

The site is located about 30 minutes by car from Ryōtsu Port.

== See also ==
- List of Historic Sites of Japan (Niigata)
