= Chōjagadaira Site =

Ruins of a Jōmon period settlement in Sado, Japan

Chōjagadaira site
- 長者ヶ平遺跡 (Japanese)
- Chōjagadaira site Chōjagadaira Site (Japan)
- 37°49′13″N 138°14′04″E
- Type: settlement
- Periods: Jōmon period
- Location: Sado, Niigata, Japan
- Region: Hokuriku region

Site notes
- Elevation: 175 m (574 ft)
- Excavation dates: 1965-1967; 1980-1982
- Public access: No public facilities

The Chōjagadaira site (長者ヶ平遺跡, Chōjagadaira iseki) is an archaeological site containing the ruins of a Jōmon period settlement located in the Ogi neighborhood of the city of Sado, Niigata in the Hokuriku region of Japan. The site was designated a National Historic Site of Japan in 2009.

== Overview ==
The Chōjagadaira site is located on Sado island, at the tip of Ogi Peninsula, at an elevation of 175 meters. It is the largest Jōmon archaeological site on Sado Island, covering an area of 100 meters east-to-west by 150 meters north-to-south. Archaeological excavations were conducted from 1965 to 1967 and 1980 to 1982, during which time a specific style of Jōmon pottery from the early to middle Jōmon period (5000 to 2000 BC), dubbed the "Chōjagadaira style" was discovered. The site contains the remains of pit dwellings, a ritual stone arrangement with standing stones, and several tombs with human skeletal remains. Artifacts included ritual clay figurines, pulley-shaped ear ornaments, stone tools, polished stone axes, microliths, deer-horn projectile points and fishing hooks.

Many of these artifacts originated from various locations in the Tōhoku, Hokuriku, Chūbu or Kantō regions of Japan, indicating that the inhabitants had contact with very distant areas despite the remote location of Sado island from the Japanese mainland.

The site is located about ten minutes by car from Ogi Port. The excavated artifacts are currently exhibited at the Ogi Archaeological Museum.

== See also ==
- List of Historic Sites of Japan (Niigata)
