= Chōjagahara Site =

Ruins of a Jōmon period settlement in Itoigawa, Japan

- 長者ヶ原遺跡 (Japanese)
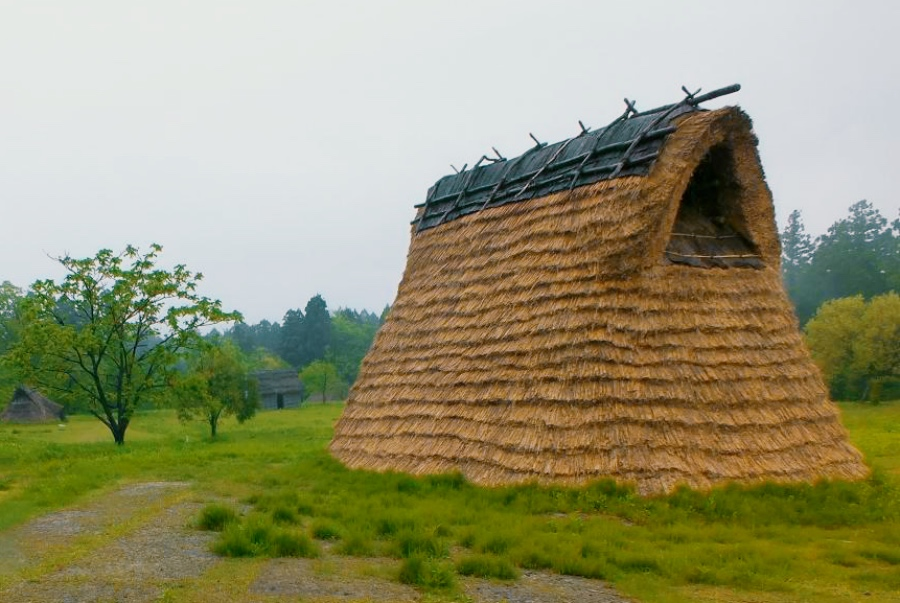
- Chōjagahara Site

- Chōjagahara Site Chōjagahara Site (Japan)
- 37°01′38″N 137°51′55″E
- Type: Settlement
- Location: Itoigawa, Niigata, Japan
- Region: Hokuriku region

History
- Built: Jōmon period

Site notes
- Elevation: 80 m (260 ft)
- Archaeologists: 1954 to 1983
- Discovered: 1890
- Public access: Yes (park and museum)

The Chōjagahara Site (長者ヶ原遺跡, Chōjagahara Iseki) is an archaeological site containing the remnants of a middle Jōmon period settlement located in the Ichinomiya neighborhood of the city of Itoigawa, Niigata in the Hokuriku region of Japan. It was designated a National Historic Site of Japan in 1971, with the area under protection expanded in 1985.

== Overview ==
The Chōjagahara Site is located on a hill with an elevation of about 90 meters above sea level, on the east side of the Himegawa River, about 2.5 kilometers from the coast of the Sea of Japan. The area is famous as the only native source of jade in Japan. The site contains the ruins of a large settlement which included a production center for jadeite and serpentine stone axes, stone tools and jade balls (used for as pestles for grinding nuts or grains) and jade beads (used for decoration). These stone axes were used in the Jōmon period primarily for the felling of trees, or for digging roots. A paleoenvironmental surveyor the area estimated that the forests consisted primarily of chestnuts, oaks, castanopsis, and walnuts (all of which provided edible nuts) and contained bears and wild boars. The brackish wetlands to the east of the village and the nearby sea was rich in fish and other marine resources. Excavations have also unearthed bones of dolphins and sea lions.

The site was discovered in 1890, and was identified by pottery shards as belonging to the middle of the Jōmon period (5,000 to 3,500 years ago) in 1938. The site has been excavated three times from 1954 to 1983 by a team from Keio University, but the portion of the site excavated so far is only about 3% of the complete site and 10% of the village. Jade beads made at this site have been found throughout the Hokuriku region and into the Chubu and Kantō regions of Japan.

The Jōmon pottery found at the site has a distinctive pattern, and is styled by archaeologists as "Chōjagahara-style pottery". Earthenware in the form of clay figurines and human-faced / beast-faced handles have also been found. In addition, pottery from various other regions of Japan have been found at the site, especially southern Nagano Prefecture, and jade balls from this site have been found widely distributed in the Chubu and Kantō regions, indicating widespread trade.

The site is open to the public as an archaeological park, with reconstructed pit dwellings and elevated floor buildings, and the Chōjagahara Archaeological Museum (長者ケ原考古館, Chōjagahara Kokokan) exhibits findings from the site. It is located about 30 minutes on foot from Itoigawa Station on the JR East Hokuriku Main Line.

== See also ==
- List of Historic Sites of Japan (Niigata)
