= Furutsu Hachimanyama Site =

Yayoi period archaeological site in Akiha-ku, Hokuriku, Japan

- 古津八幡山遺跡 (Japanese)
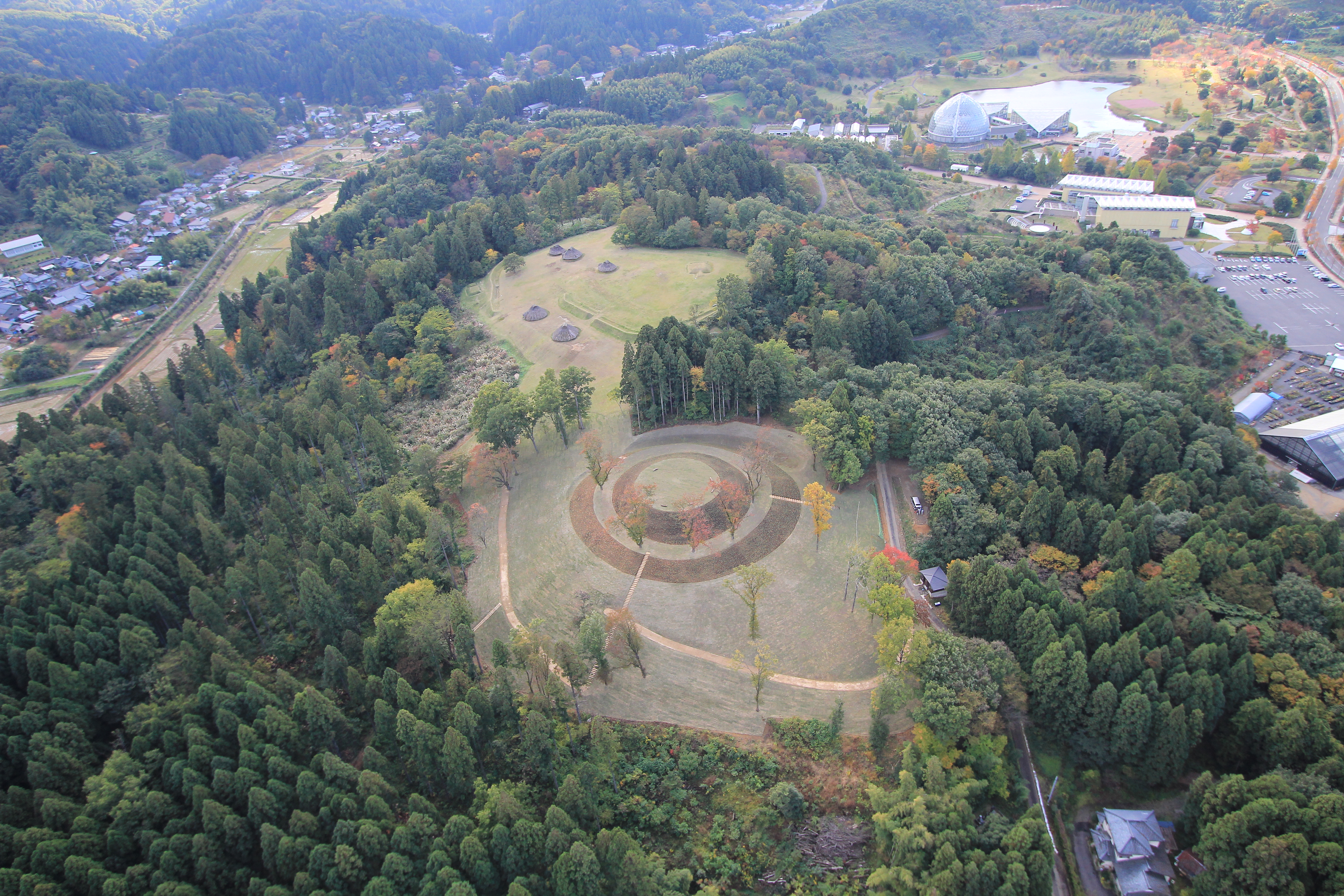
- Furutsu Hachimanyama kofun

- Furutsu Hachimanyama Site Furutsu Hachimanyama Site (Japan)
- 37°45′50″N 139°06′55″E
- Type: settlement, kofun
- Periods: Yayoi period
- Location: Akiha-ku, Niigata, Japan
- Region: Hokuriku region

Site notes
- Public access: Yes (Park, Museum)
- National Historic Site of Japan

The Furutsu Hachimanyama Site (古津八幡山遺跡, Furutsu Hachimanyama iseki) is an archaeological site containing the remnants of a late Yayoi period moated settlement with three Kofun tumuli located in the Furutsu neighborhood of Akiha-ku, Niigata in the Hokuriku region of Japan. The site was designated a National Historic Site of Japan in 2005, with the area under preservation extended in 2011 It is the northernmost moated Yayoi settlement site thus far discovered on the Sea of Japan coast.

== Overview ==
During the late Yayoi period, settlements began appearing on hilltop locations with defensive fortifications. The Furutsu Hachimanyama Site was discovered in 1987 during construction of the Ban-etsu Expressway. It consists of a late Yayoi period moated settlement on a slight elevation (15 to 55 meters) above the Niigata Plain in between the Shinano and Agano Rivers, extending for 400 meters from north-to-south and 150 meters from east-to-west. The settlement was surrounded by a V-shaped moat, intermittent in places, double in others, with a depth three meters and width of two meters. The soil excavated from the moats were used to form a rudimentary earthen rampart. Within the moat were the foundation pillar holes for 45 rectangular raised-floor dwellings, measuring four to five meters on each side, with a hearth in the center and a drainage groove. The foundations of 32 pit dwellings have also been identified. Yayoi pottery from the Tōhoku region, notably from what is now Aizu and other parts of the Hokuriku region have been found, together with locally made pottery. This indicates some form of long distance trade and a connection between this site and the inland region of Aizu.

Two square tumuli are located a short distance outside the moat, and an iron sword with a deer horn handle and a stone spearpoint were excavated from the traces of the burial chambers. A little further away, on a small rise overlooking the settlement is a "two conjoined rectangles" type tumuli (zenpō-kōhō-fun (前方後方墳)), orientated to the north, which was found to have no grave goods. It is estimated to date from the end of the Yayoi period.

Some artifacts uncovered at the site are on display at the Yayoi Hill Exhibition Hall (弥生の丘展示館, Yayoi no Oka tenjikan) at site, and some representations of pit houses have been rebuilt. The site is about a 10-minute walk from Furutsu Station on the JR East Shin'etsu Main Line.

=== Furutsu Hachimanyama Kofun ===
The Furutsu Hachimanyama Kofun (古津八幡山古墳) within the National Historic Site is a two-tier domed tumuli, with the domed portion on top of a circular base, partially surrounded by a moat. With a diameter of 60 meters, it is one of the largest in Niigata Prefecture. It is believed to have been constructed in the early Kofun period, but has not been excavated. It is located to the northwest of the settlement at the Furutsu Hachimanyama Site.

== Gallery ==
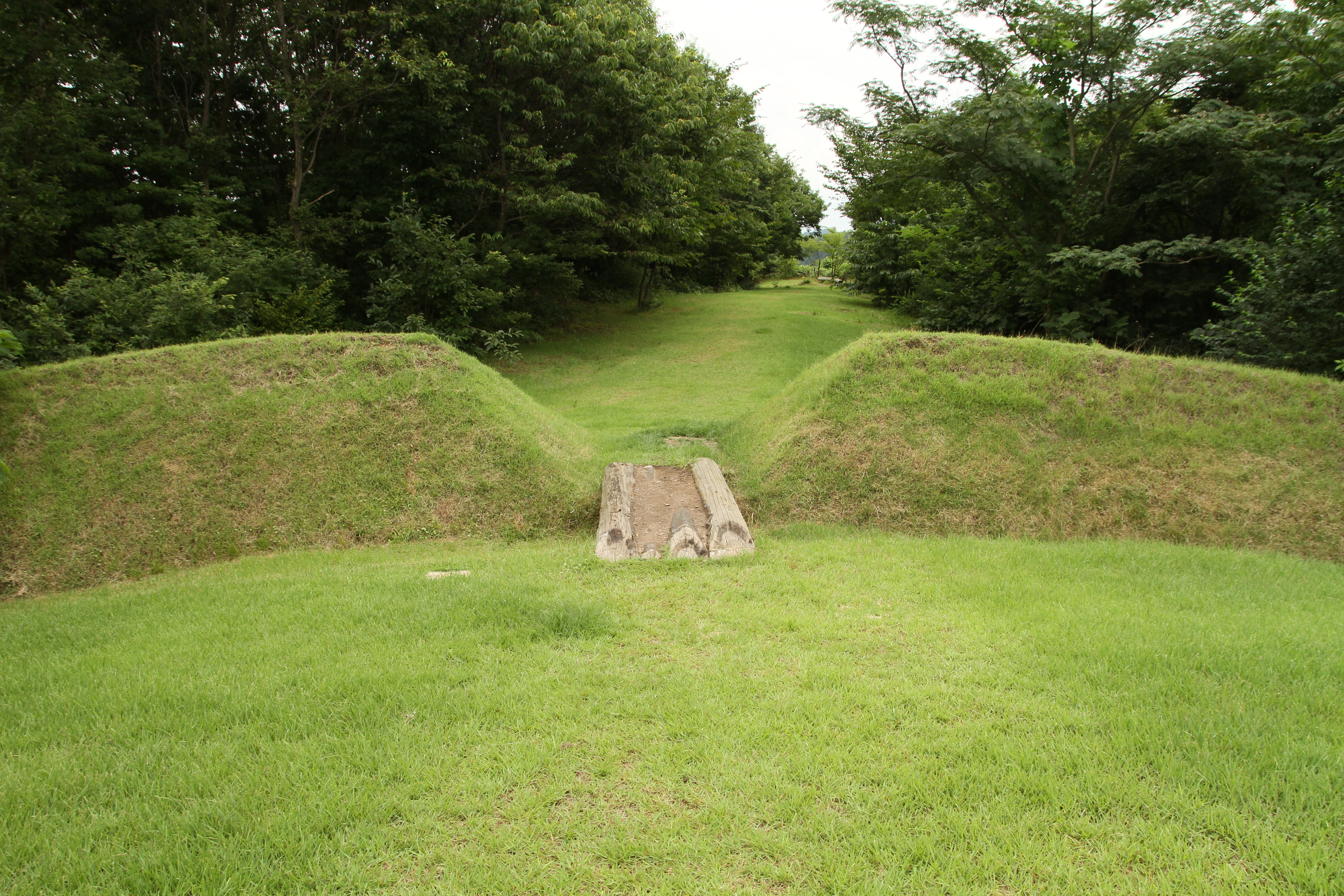
portion of moat and rampart

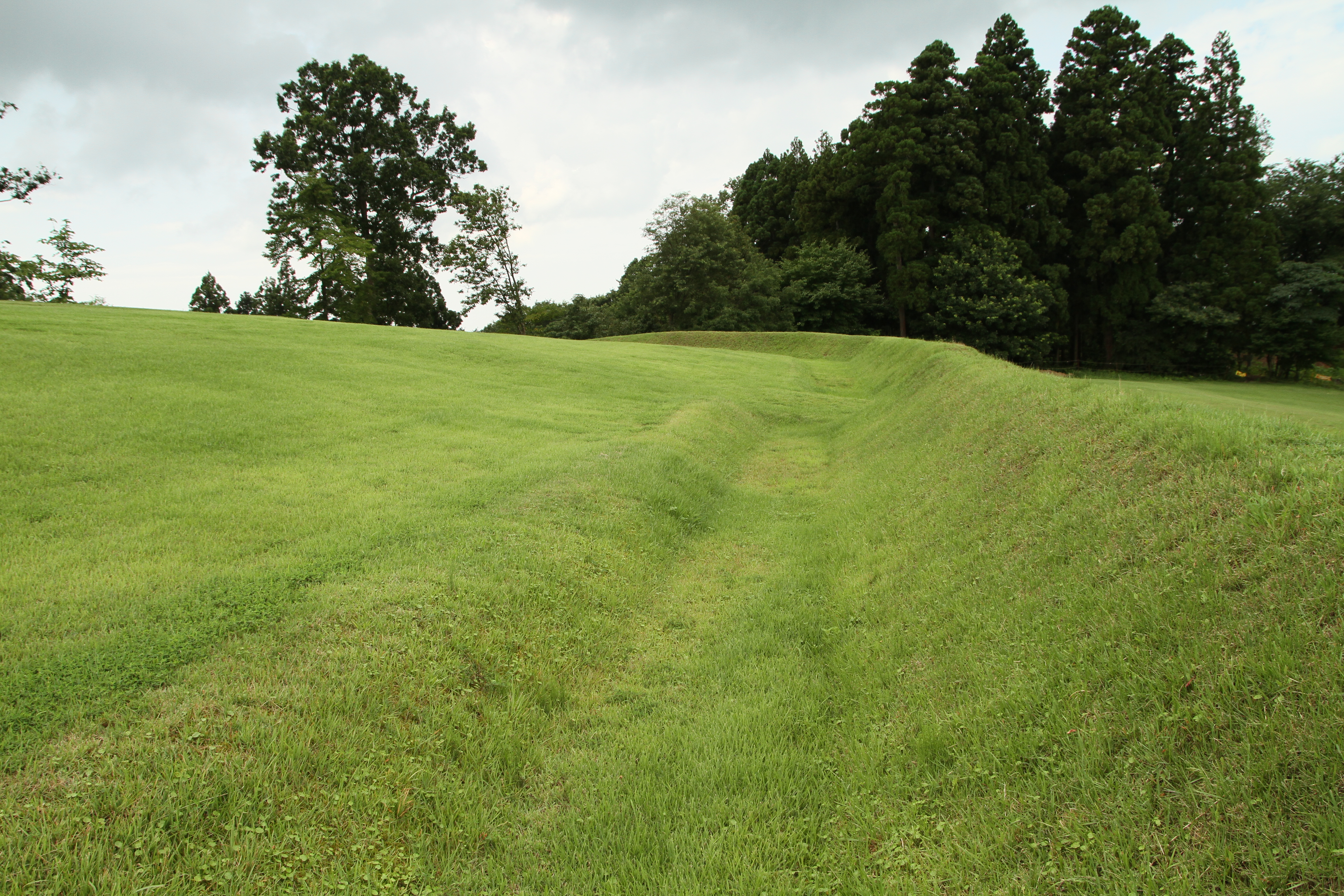
Tumuli

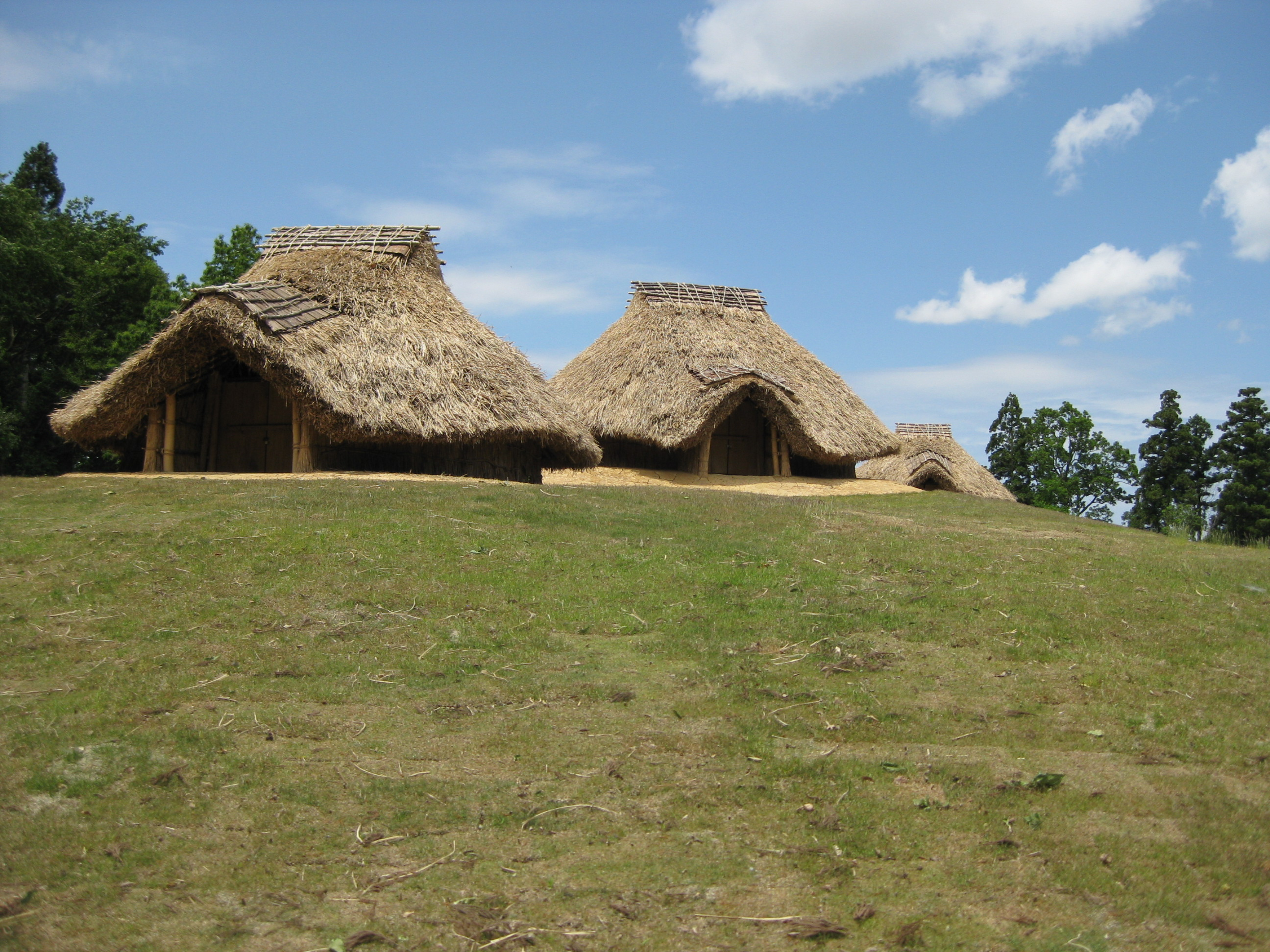
Reconstructed pit houses

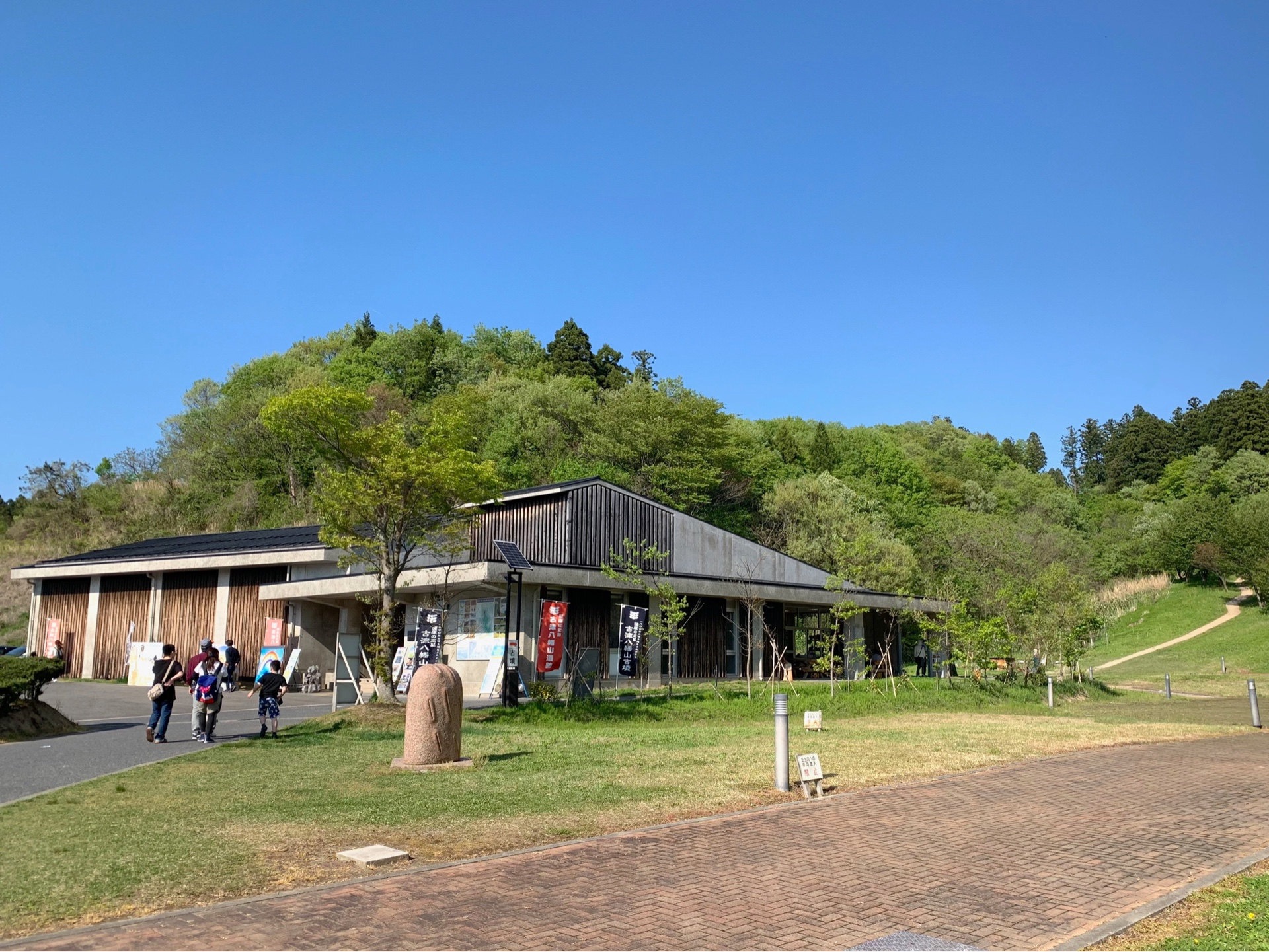
Furutsu Hachiman Museum

== See also ==
- List of Historic Sites of Japan (Niigata)
