= Terachi Site =

- 寺地遺跡 (Japanese)
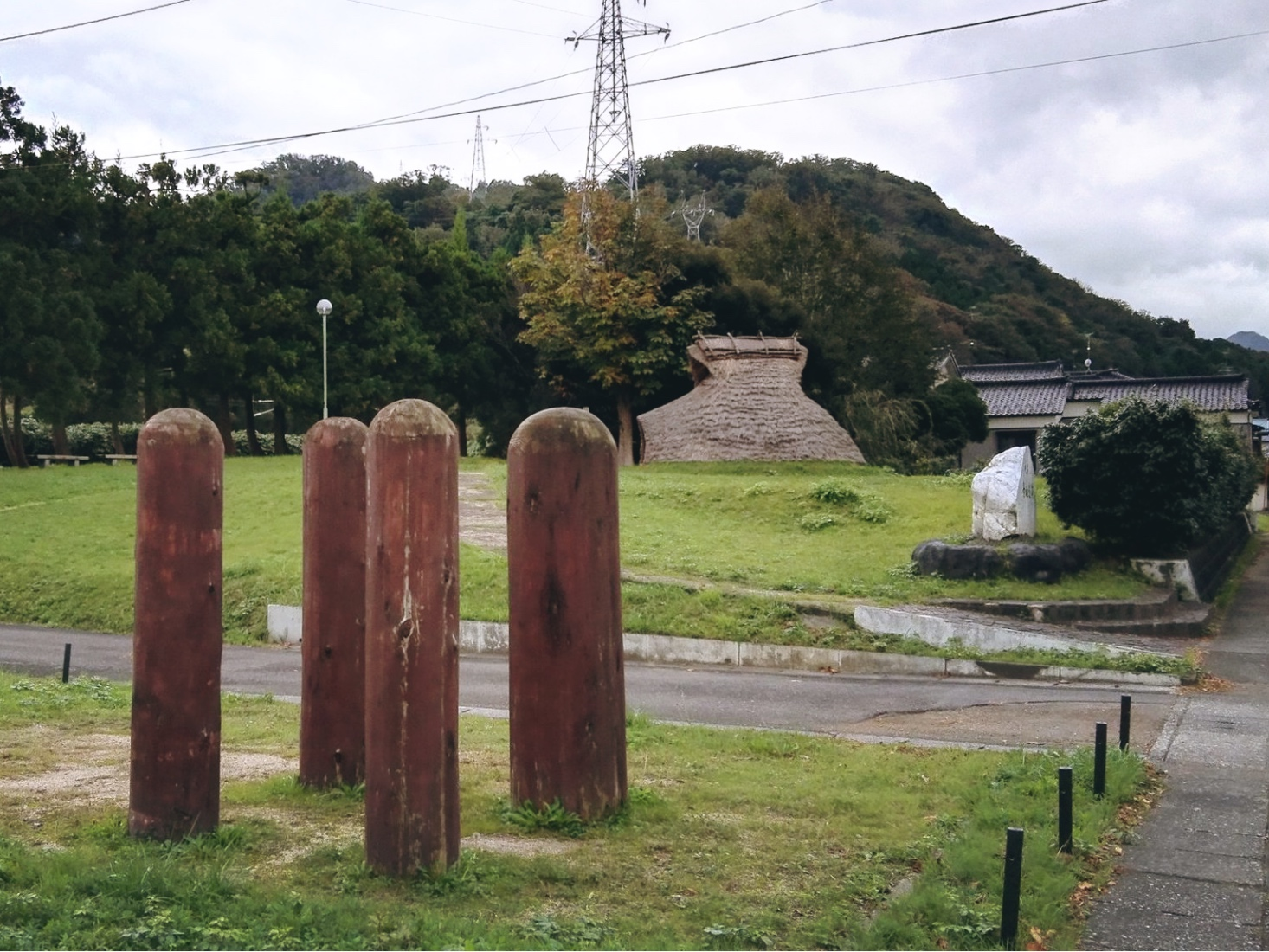
- Terachi Site with four pillars and reconstructed pit dwelling

- Terachi Site Terachi Site (Japan)
- 37°01′30″N 137°48′34″E
- Type: Settlement
- Location: Itoigawa, Niigata, Japan
- Region: Hokuriku region

History
- Built: Jōmon

Site notes
- Public access: Yes (park)

Terachi Site (寺地遺跡, Terachi Iseki) is an archaeological site containing the traces of a middle to late Jōmon period settlement located in the Teraji neighborhood of the city of Itoigawa, Niigata in the Hokuriku region of Japan. The site was designated a National Historic Site of Japan in 1980.

== Overview ==
The Terachi Site is located on a low hill in coastal area of the Sea of Japan at the western end of Niigata Prefecture. The site is facing the ocean, between the Hime River and the Oumi River, in the only area of Japan known to have natural jadeite deposits. Five archaeological excavations were conducted before and after 1973. The site encompasses five separate areas (designated Districts A through E) across a 150 meters east-to-west by 650 meters north-to-south site, and contains the ruins of a large village from in the middle to late Jōmon period (5,000 to 3,500 years ago).

District B of the site was first discovered in the latter part of the Meiji period during construction work for the Hokuriku Main Line railway, and was partially excavated in 1968-1970. District A was discovered in 1966 and District C in 1965. District B was found to contain seven pit dwellings, which were workshops for the mass production of jadeite and serpentine stone axes and jade beads, magatama, fishhooks, spearheads and grinding stones. In addition to finished and semi-finished items, the site contained whetstones, abrasive sales and furnaces, indicating that these buildings were a complete production complex - one of the earliest to have been discovered in Japan. A peculiar arrangement with four huge wooden pillars has also attracted attention, and is believed to have been of some ritual significance, or part of an ancient calendar to determine the winter solstice. The pillars have been replaced by concrete reproductions.

Jade beads made at this site have been found throughout the Hokuriku region and into the Kantō region of Japan. The site is about a 15-minute walk from Aomi Station on the JR East Hokuriku Main Line.

The site is open to the public as an archaeological park, with a couple reconstructed pit dwellings.

== See also ==
- List of Historic Sites of Japan (Niigata)
