= Mizushina Kofun Group =

- 水科古墳群 (Japanese)
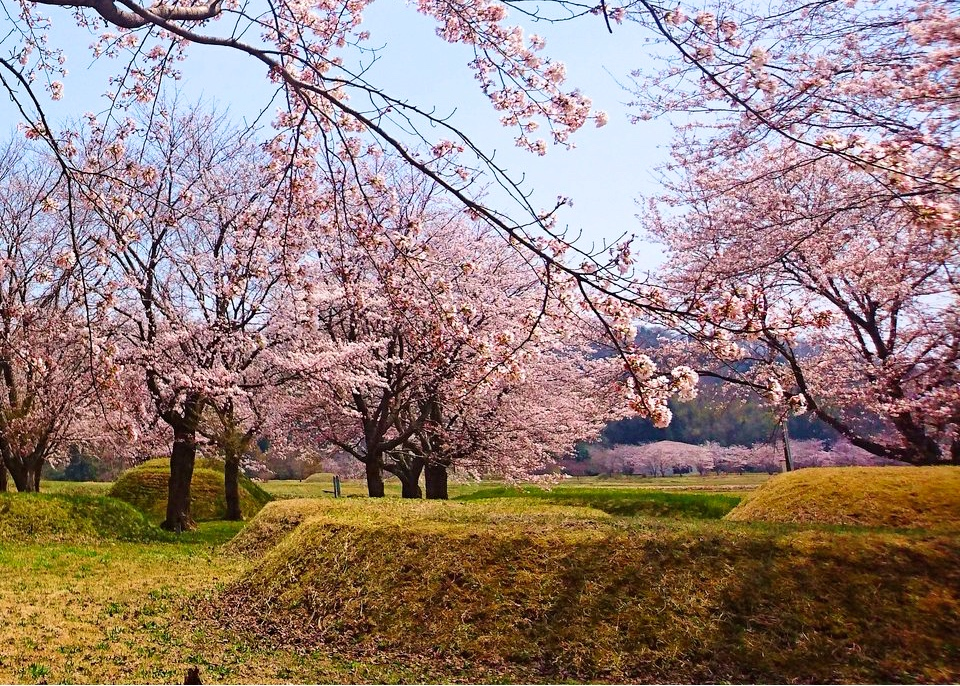
- Mizushina Kofun Group

- Mizushina Kofun Group Mizushina Kofun Group (Japan)
- 37°05′41″N 138°21′05″E
- Type: Kofun
- Location: Jōetsu, Niigata, Japan
- Region: Hokuriku region

History
- Built: Kofun period

Site notes
- Area: 101,160 m^{2} (1,088,900 sq ft)
- Public access: Yes

Mizushina Kofun Group (水科古墳群, Mizushina Kofun-gun) is a group of late Kofun period burial tumulii located in the Mizushina neighborhood of the city of Jōetsu, Niigata in the Hokuriku region of Japan. The site was designated a National Historic Site of Japan in 1976.

== Overview ==
The Mizushina Kofun cluster is located in a rice field on the western edge of the Takada Plain, near the alluvial delta of the Inada River. Within a very small area (approximately one hectare) is a group of 34 circular-shaped circular-type (empun (円墳)) kofun with flattened tops. Each has a diameter of seven to ten meters, with the largest in the cluster (Mound No. 21) having a diameter of 20 meters and height of three meters, with a circumferential moat. Only a few of the tombs have been found to have fukiishi. Nine of the tombs have been excavated, and were found to contain a lateral stone burial chamber with a stone sarcophagus. The burial chambers were 4.5 meters long on average, with the longest being 8.6 meters, and had a width of 0.7 to 1.0 meter, although a few were considerably smaller. Grave goods included straight swords, daggers, jewellery (cylindrical beads, magatama, glass balls, gold and silver rings) and Sue ware pottery. From these grave goods, it is estimated that these tombs were constructed in the early 7th century, or towards the end of the Kofun period.

The site is open to the public as an archaeological park, with many of the artifacts discovered stored and displayed at the nearby Maki History and Folklore Museum (牧歴史民俗資料館) . It is located 20 minutes by car from Takada Station on the JR East Shin'etsu Main Line.

== Gallery ==
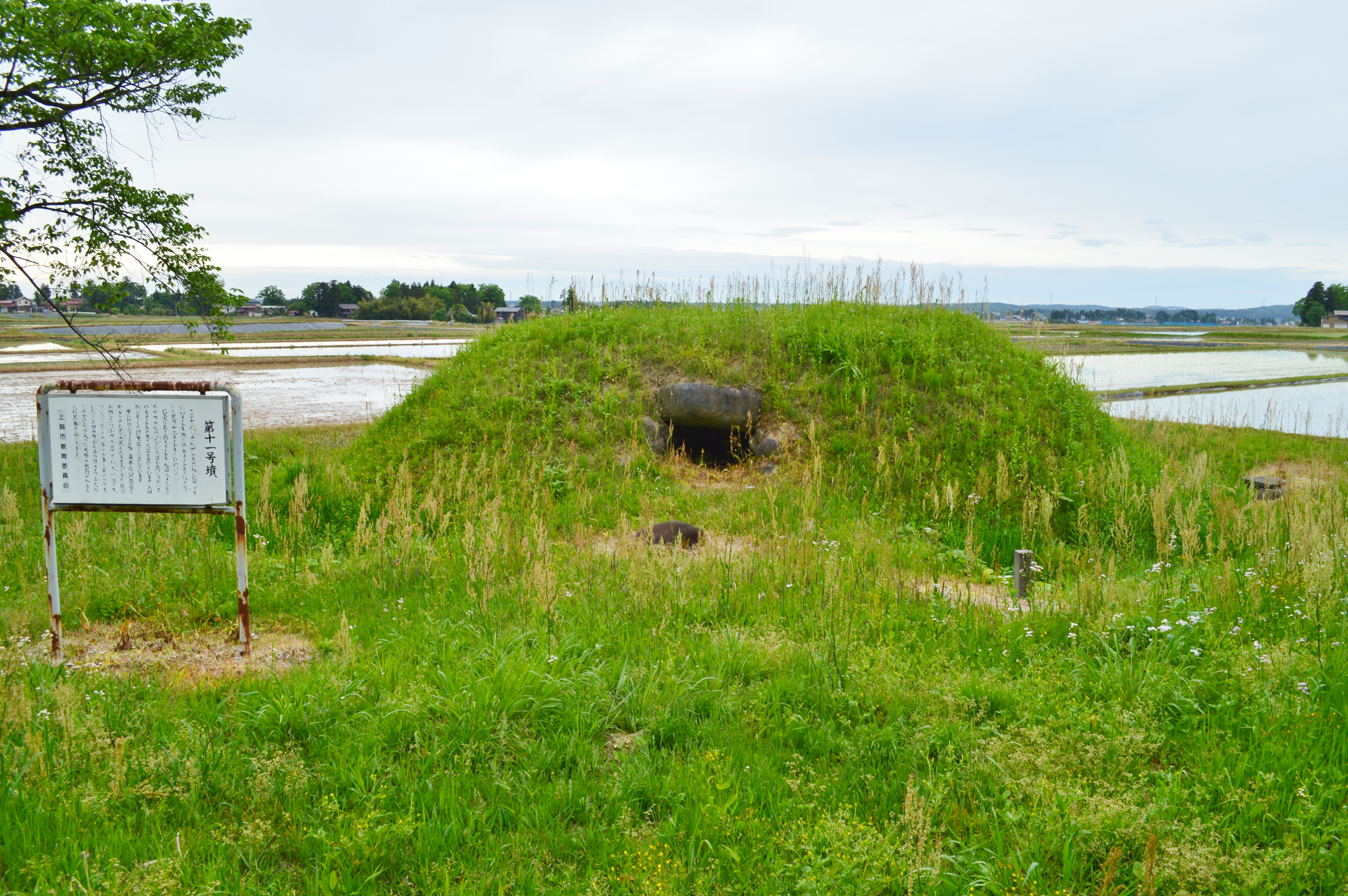
No.11

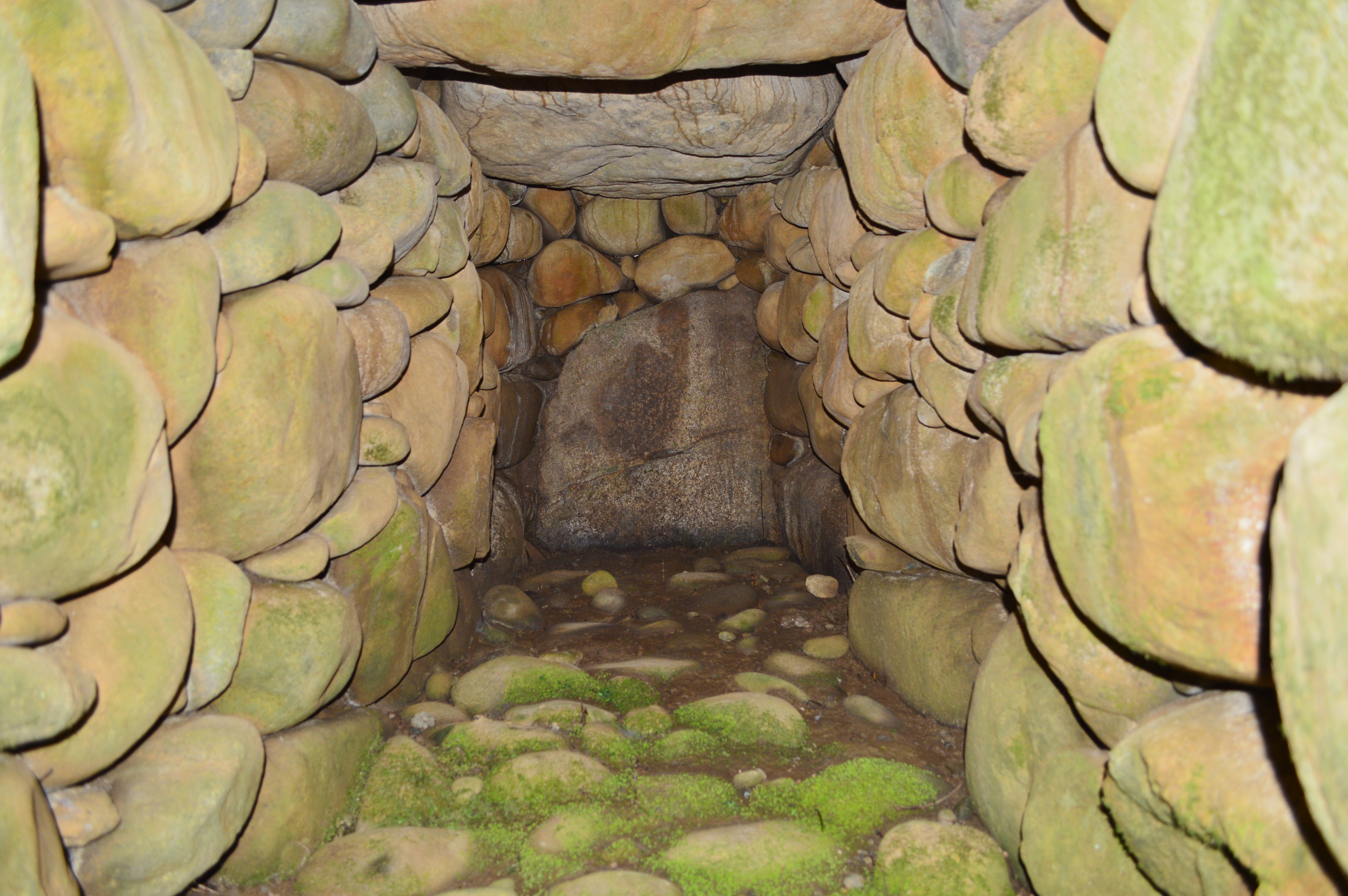
No11 burial chamber

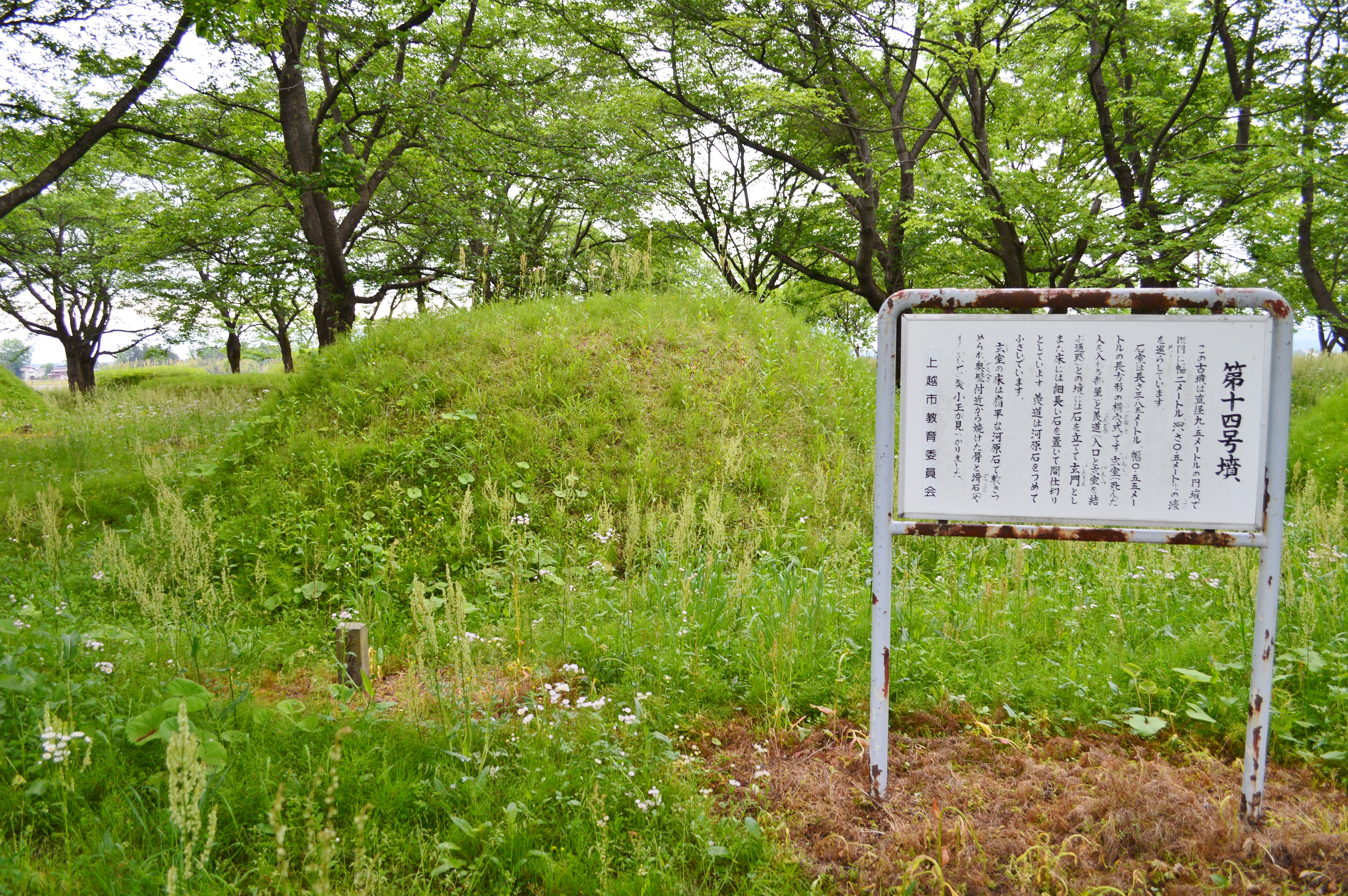
No14

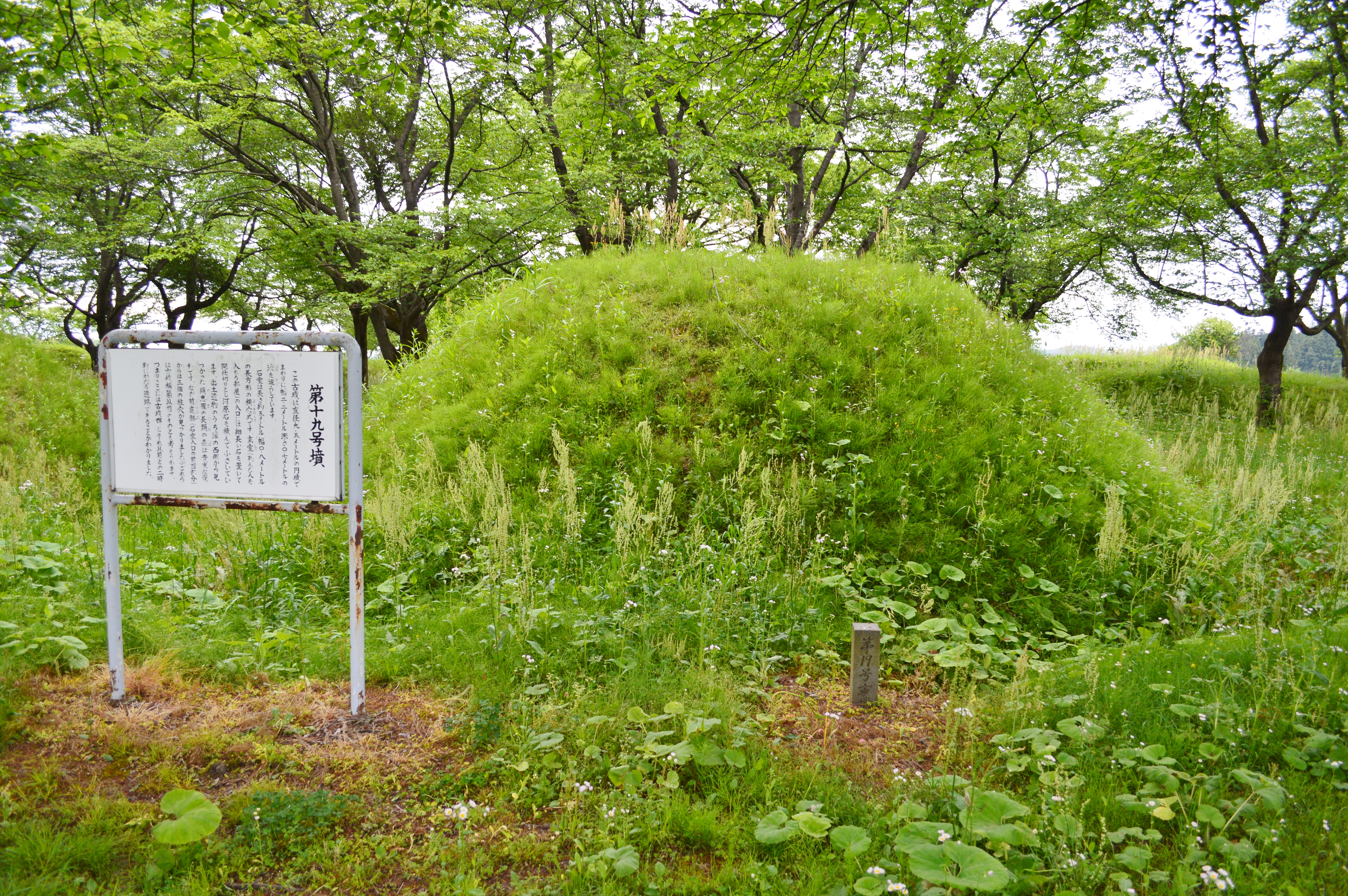
No.19

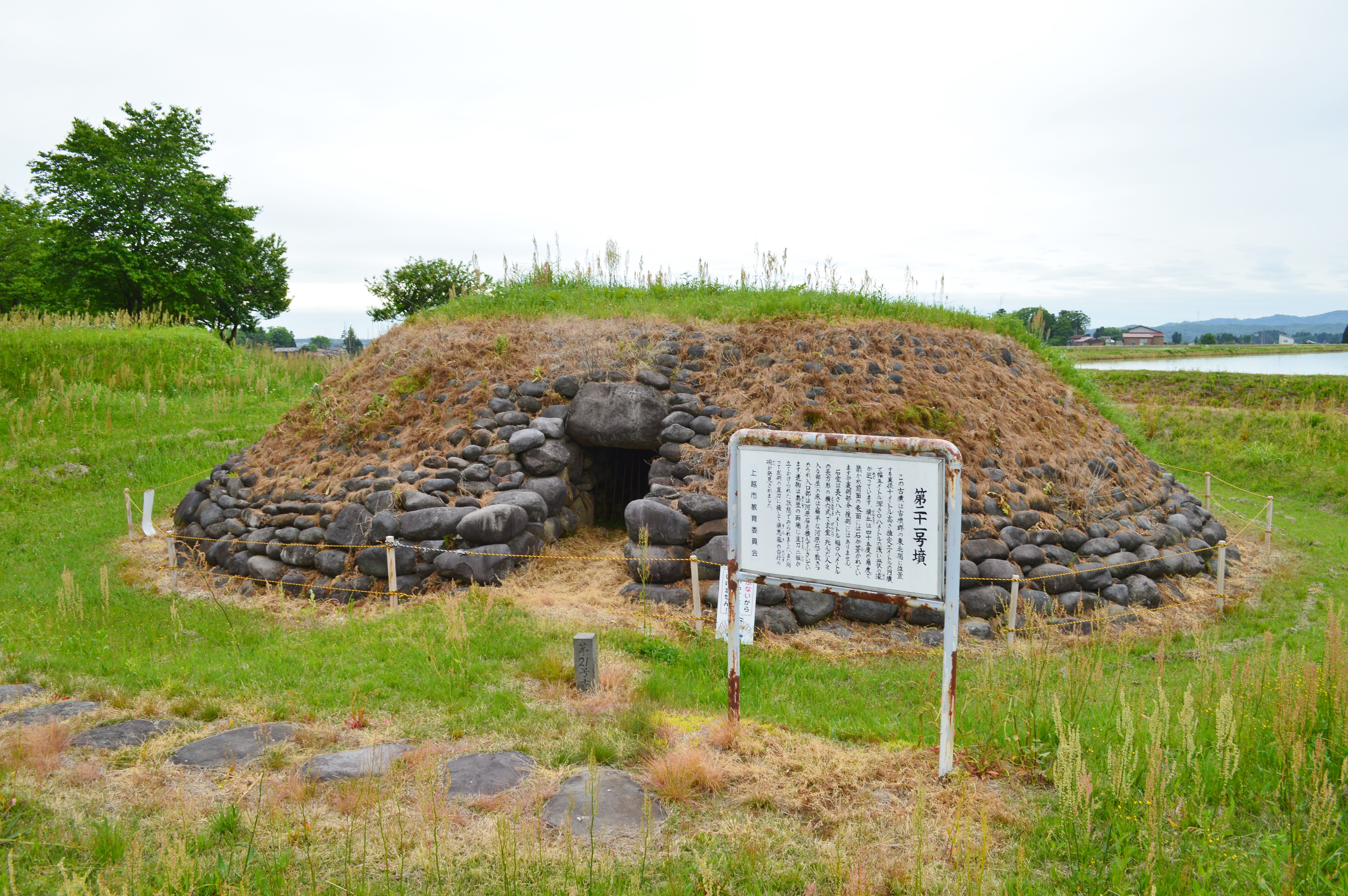
No.21

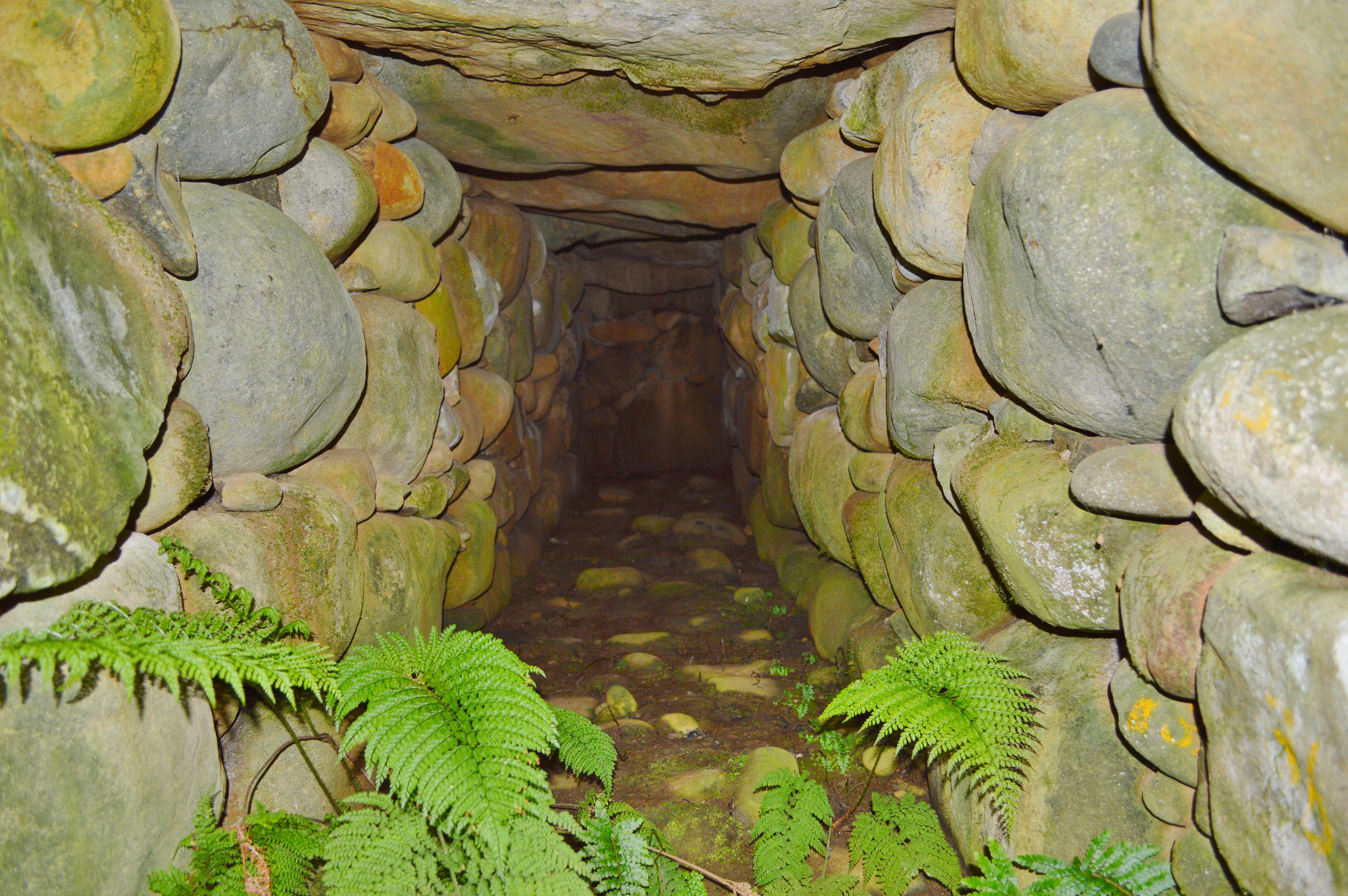
No.21 burial chamber

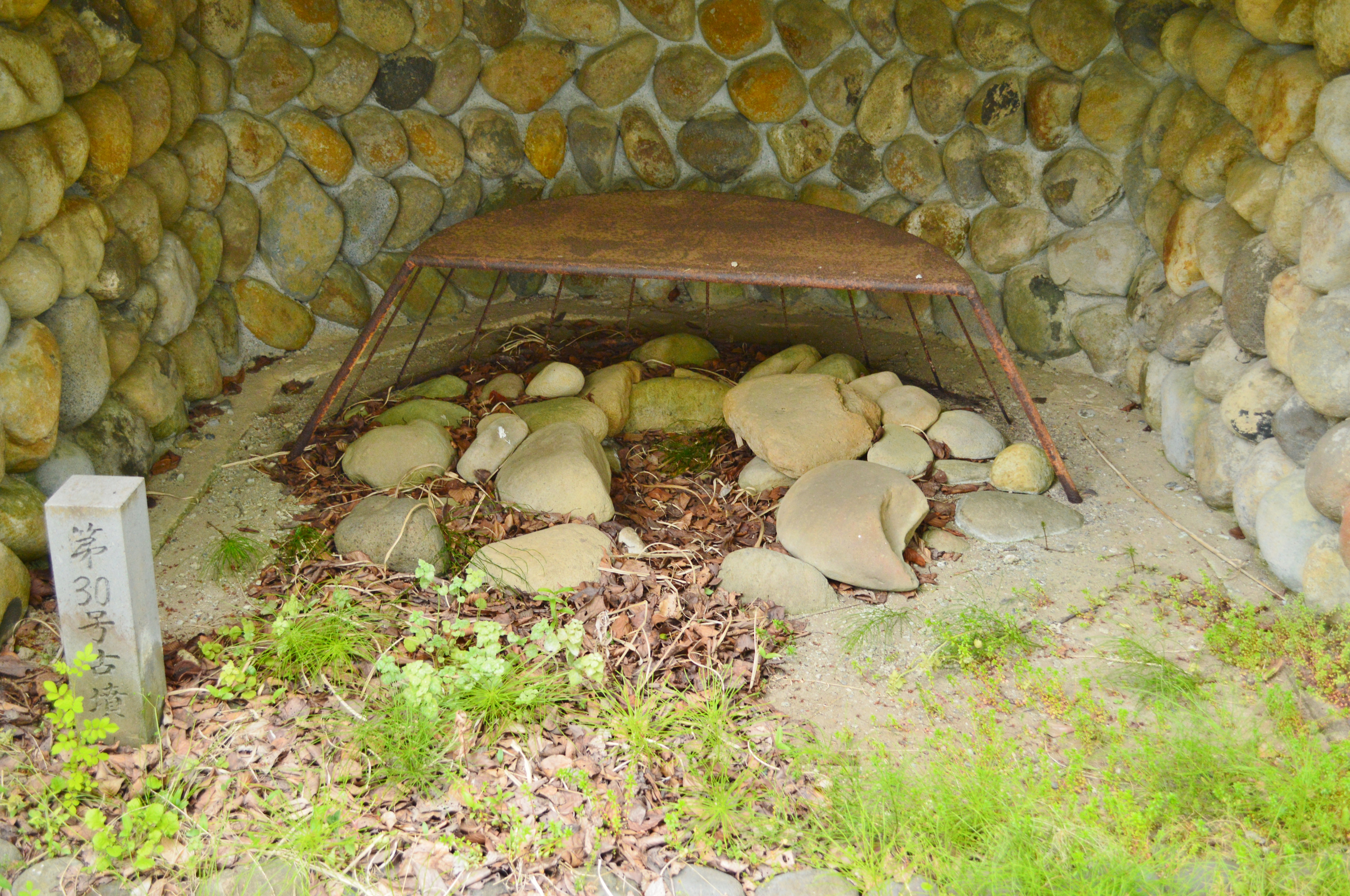
No.30 burial chamber

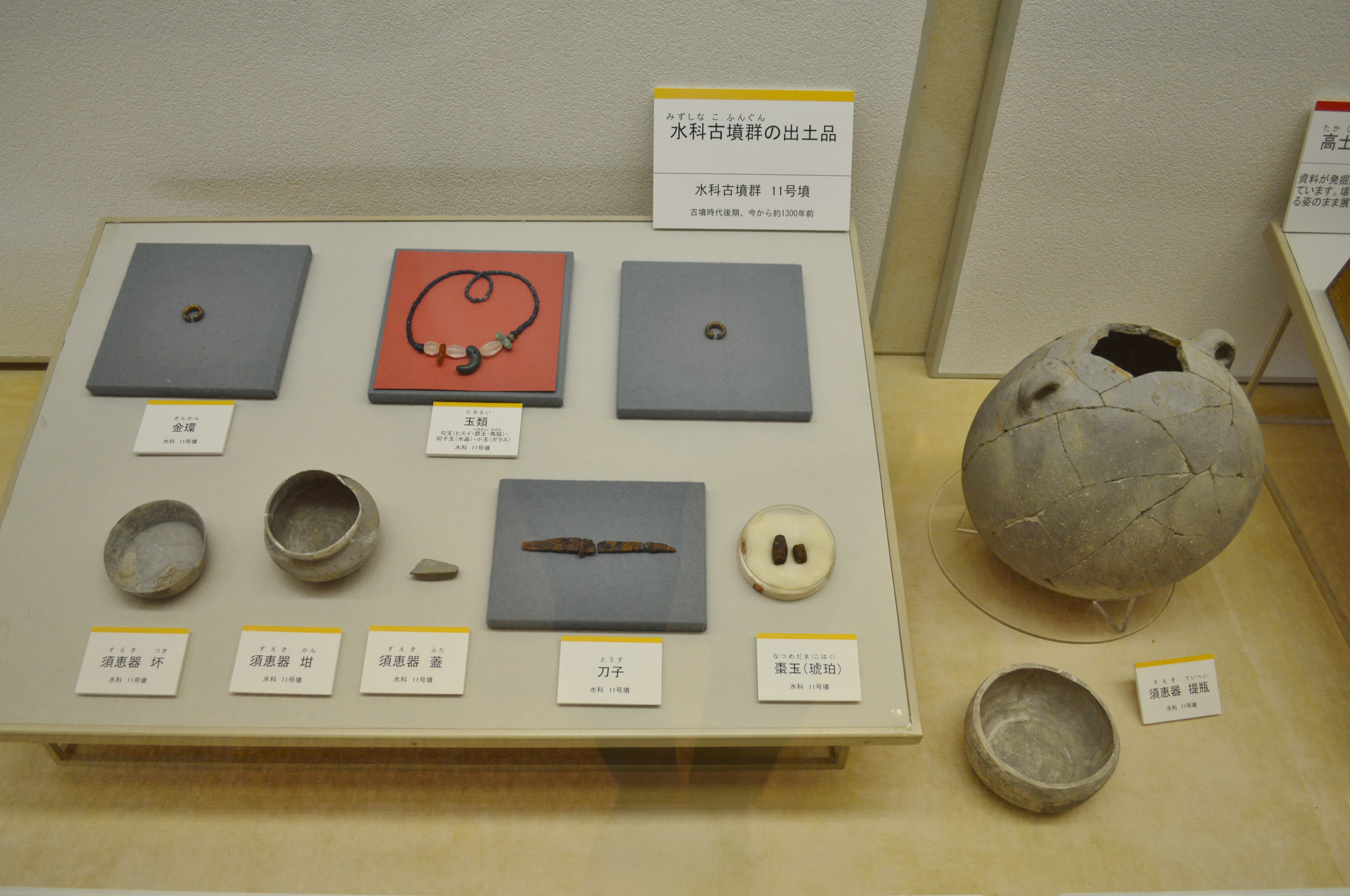
Artifacts from No.11

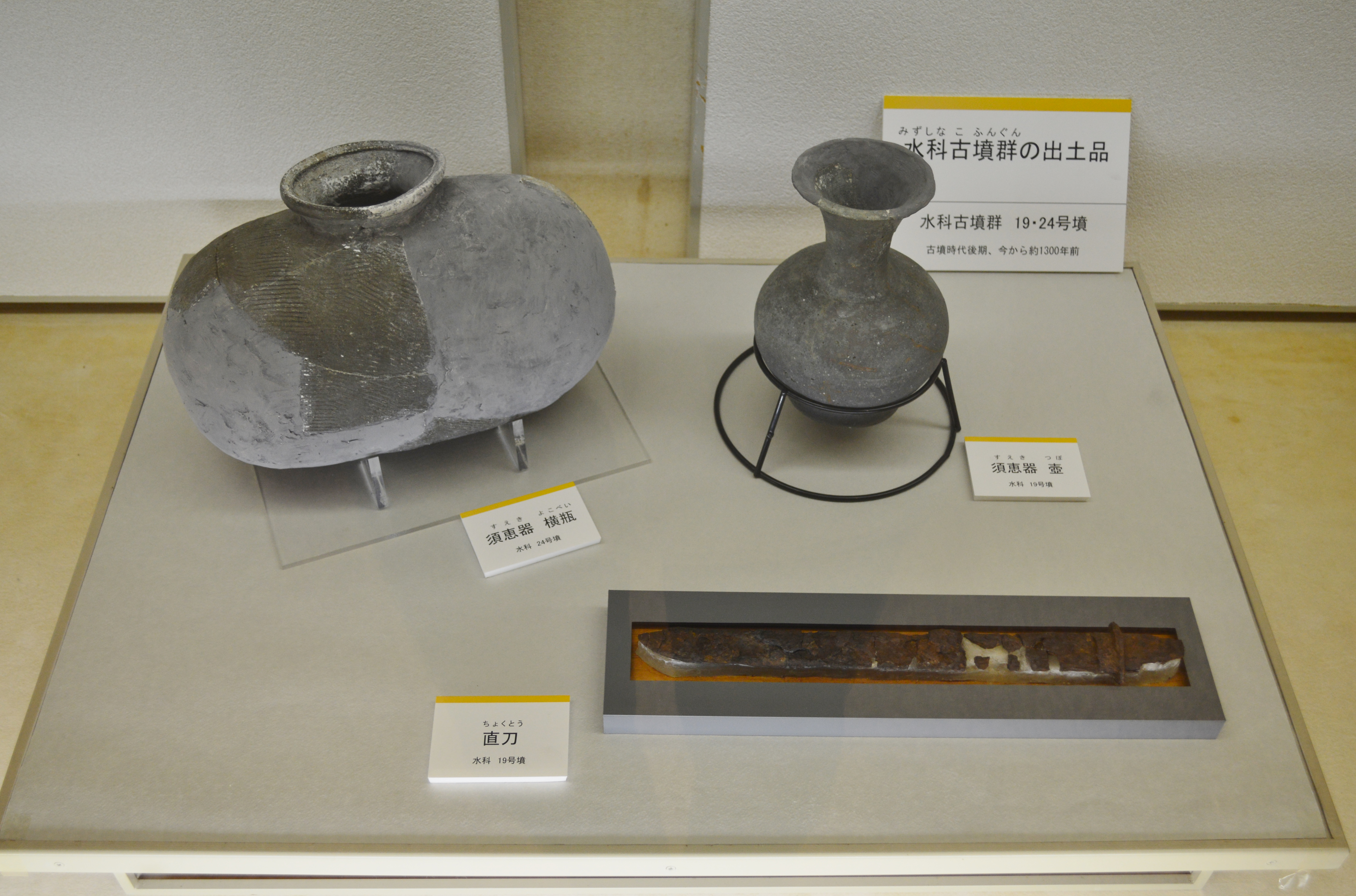
Artifacts from No.19・No. 24

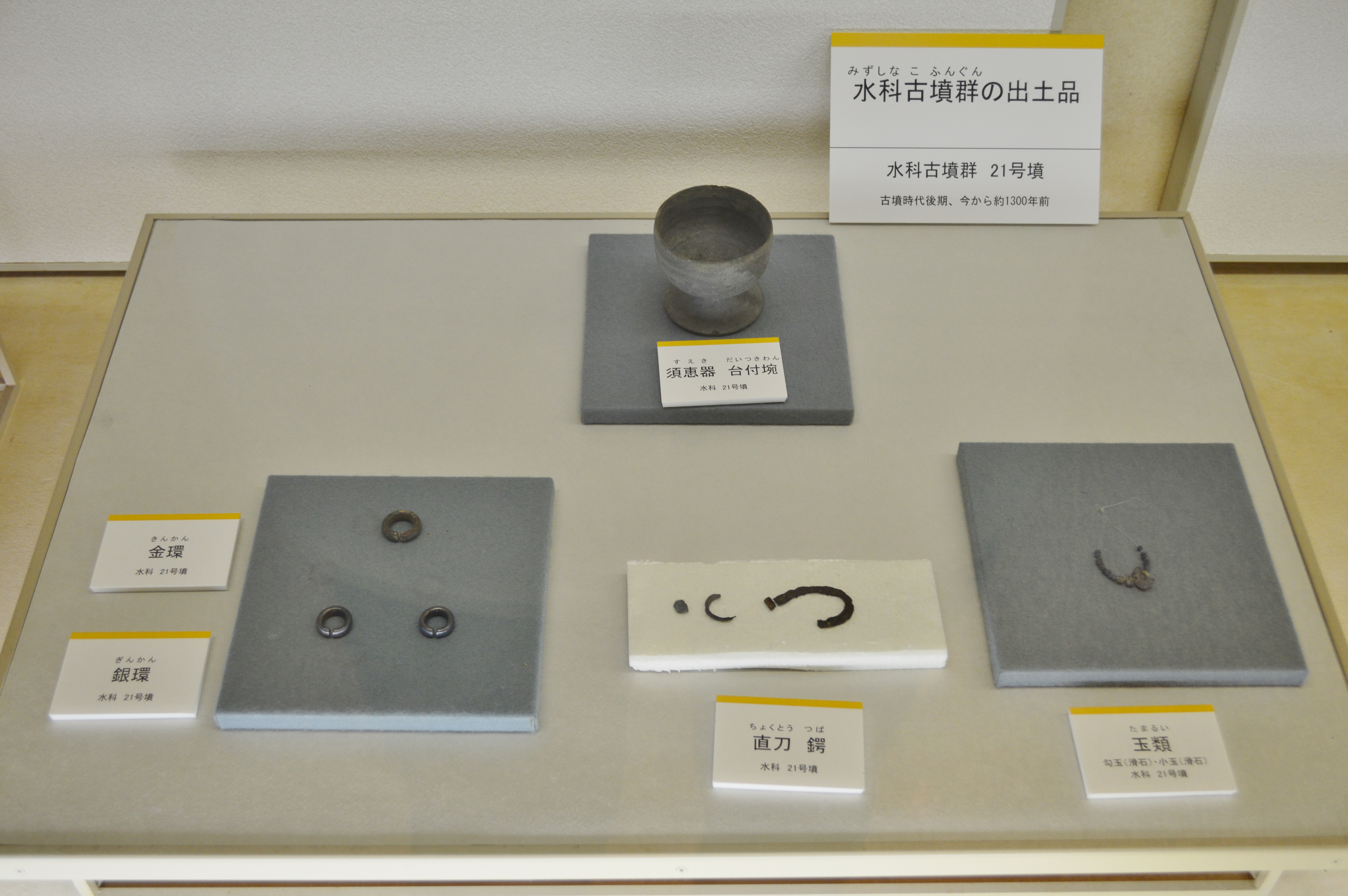
Artifacts from No.21

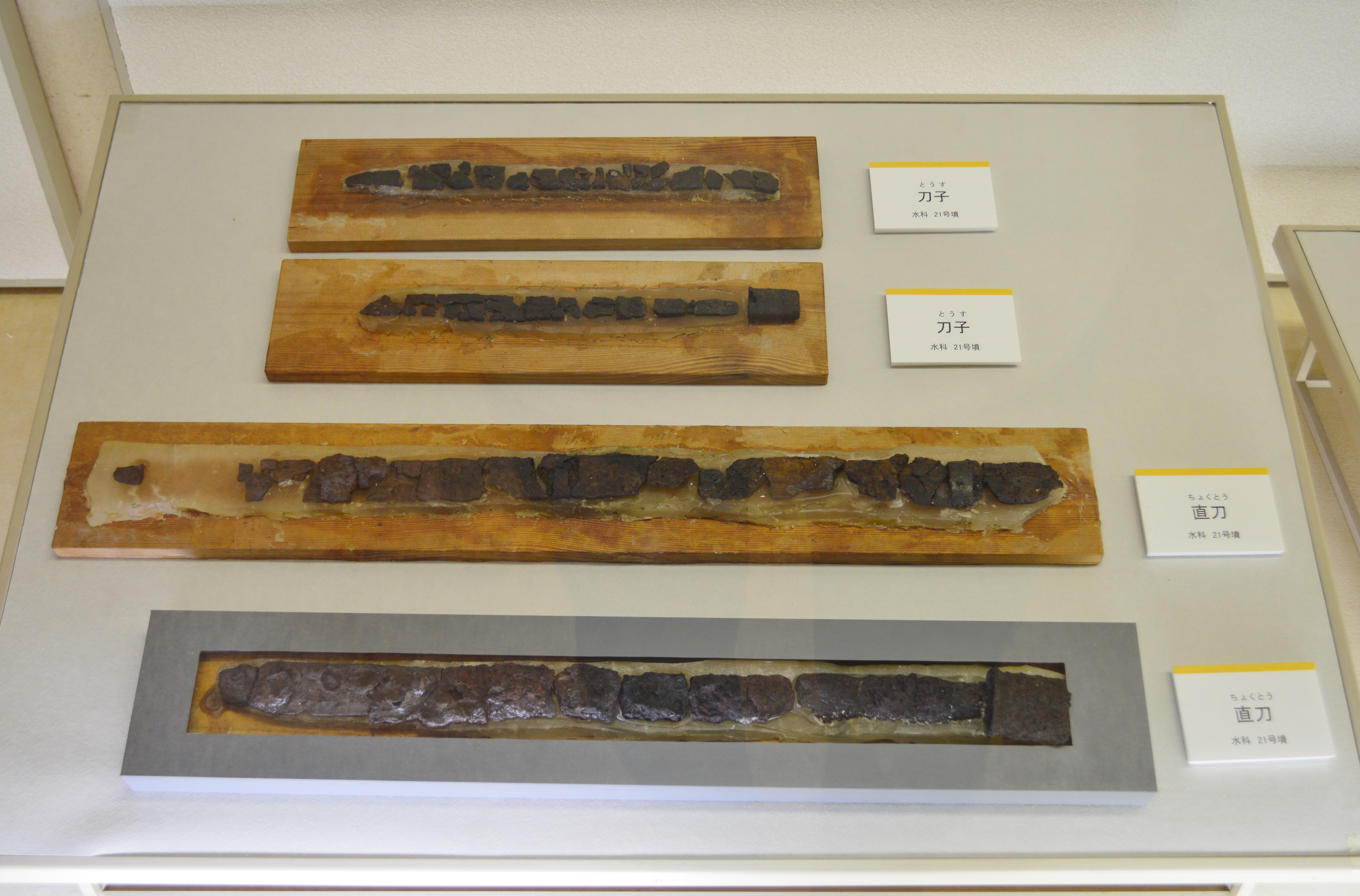
Artifacts from No.21

== See also ==
- List of Historic Sites of Japan (Niigata)
