= List of historic sites of Japan (Niigata) =

This list is of the historic sites of Japan located within the Prefecture of Niigata.

== National Historic Sites ==
As of 1 January 2021, thirty-three Sites have been designated as being of national significance.

Site	Municipality	Comments	Image	Coordinates	Type	Ref.
Okuyama shōjōkan ruins 奥山荘城館遺跡 Okuyama no shōjōkan iseki	Tainai, Shibata	designation includes the sites of Egami Fortified Residence (江上館跡), Tossaka Castle (鳥坂城跡), Kurata Castle (倉田城跡), Nonaka Stone Tōba (野中石塔婆群), Kotaka-gū Precinct (小鷹宮境内地), Idatenyama (韋駄天山遺跡), Kurokawa Castle (黒川城跡), Zao Gongen (蔵王権現遺跡), Kusamizu (臭水遺跡), the Kaneyama Castle Sites (金山城跡) (Ganmonyama Castle (願文山城跡), Taka Fortified Residence (高館跡), Tatenouchi (館ノ内跡), and Katatsumuriyama Castle (蝸牛山城跡)), Bō Fortified Residence (坊城館跡), Furudate Fortified Residence (古館館跡), and Tossaka Castle Sanrokukyo Fortified Residence (鳥坂城跡の山麓居館跡)	Okuyama Manor, Castle, and Fortified Residence Sites	38°03′18″N 139°25′18″E	2	886
Okinohara Site 沖ノ原遺跡 Okinohara iseki	Tsunan	Jōmon period settlement trace	Okinohara Site	36°59′33″N 138°39′06″E	1	875
Shimokō Site 下国府遺跡 Shimokō iseki	Sado			37°58′35″N 138°21′53″E	1	872
Shimoyachi Site 下谷地遺跡 Shimoyachi iseki	Kashiwazaki	Yayoi period settlement trace		37°23′51″N 138°37′27″E	1	880
Kannondaira-Tenjindō Kofun Group 観音平・天神堂古墳群 Kannondaira-Tenjindō kofun-gun	Myōkō	Kofun period tumuli cluster	Kannondaira-Tenjindō Kofun Group	37°03′36″N 138°13′55″E	1	874
Miyaguchi Kofun Group 宮口古墳群 Miyaguchi kofun-gun	Jōetsu	Kofun period tumuli cluster	Miyaguchi Kofun Group	37°05′36″N 138°21′27″E	1	871
Former Niigata Customs House 旧新潟税関 kyū-Niigata zeikan	Niigata	Meiji period building	Former Niigata Customs House	37°55′49″N 139°03′27″E	9	866
Furutsu Hachimanyama Site 古津八幡山遺跡 Furutsu Hachimanyama iseki	Niigata	Kofun period settlement trace; designation includes Furutsu Hachimanyama Kofun (古津八幡山古墳)	Furutsu Hachimanyama Site	37°45′50″N 139°06′55″E	1	00003455
Araya Site 荒屋遺跡 Araya iseki	Nagaoka	Japanese Paleolithic site	Araya Site	37°15′51″N 138°51′31″E	2	3430
Sado Gold and Silver Mine Sites 佐渡金銀山遺跡 Sado kinginzan iseki	Sado	designation includes the sites of Dōyū-no-wareto (道遊の割戸), Sōdayū path (宗太夫間歩), Minamisawa drainage channel (南沢疎水道), the Sado bugyō offices (佐渡奉行所跡), imperial Sado branch offices (御料局佐渡支庁跡), a shōrō, memorial tō (including one for Ōkubo Nagayasu), Kawamura Hikozaemon (河村彦左衛門), the Fukiage Coast pits (吹上海岸石切場跡), post-Meiji Restoration facilities (旧佐渡鉱山の明治以降の施設群), Tsurushi silver mine (鶴子銀山跡), the Katahotori-Kanoura Coast pits (片辺・鹿野浦海岸石切場跡), and Kamiaikawa mining town (上相川地区の鉱山町跡); the Sado complex of heritage mines, primarily gold mines have been proposed for inscription on the UNESCO World Heritage List;	Sado Gold and Silver Mine Sites	38°02′45″N 138°15′56″E	2, 3, 6	888
Sado Kokubun-ji Site 佐渡国分寺跡 Sado Kokubunji ato	Sado	Nara period temple ruins		37°58′00″N 138°22′01″E	3	844
Sakado Castle ruins 坂戸城跡 Sakado-jō ato	Minamiuonuma	Sengoku period castle ruins	Sakado Castle ruins	37°03′41″N 138°53′41″E	2	879
Samegao Castle Site 鮫ヶ尾城跡 Samegao-jō ato	Myōkō	Sengoku period castle ruins	Samegao Castle Site	37°03′04″N 138°13′48″E	2	00003599
Yamamoto Site 山元遺跡 Yamamoto iseki	Murakami	Yayoi period settlement trace		38°13′27″N 139°28′48″E	1	00003946
Terachi Site 寺地遺跡 Terachi iseki	Itoigawa	Jōmon period settlement trace	Terachi Site	37°01′30″N 137°48′34″E	1	883
Mimitori Site 耳取遺跡 Mimitori iseki	Mitsuke	Jōmon period settlement trace		37°30′27″N 138°55′12″E	1	00003878
Muroya Cave 室谷洞窟 Muroya dōkutsu	Aga	Jōmon period settlement trace	Muroya Cave	37°32′35″N 139°21′46″E	1	881
Kasugayama Castle ruins 春日山城跡 Kasugayama-jō ato	Jōetsu	Sengoku period castle ruins	Kasugayama Castle ruins	37°08′50″N 138°12′33″E	2	850
Kosegasawa Cave 小瀬ヶ沢洞窟 Kosegasawa dōkutsu	Aga	Jōmon period settlement trace	Kosegasawa Cave	37°35′32″N 139°24′18″E	1	884
Matsumoto Kaidō 松本街道 Matsumoto kaidō	Itoigawa	ancient road	Matsumoto Kaidō	36°59′07″N 137°52′33″E	6	3321
Ayamezuka Kofun 菖蒲塚古墳 Ayamezuka kofun	Niigata	Kofun period tumulus	Ayamezuka Kofun	37°46′00″N 138°51′57″E	1	846
Mizushina Kofun Group 水科古墳群 Mizushina kofun-gun	Jōetsu	Kofun period tumuli cluster	Mizushina Kofun Group	37°05′41″N 138°21′05″E	1	870
Murakami Castle Site 村上城跡 Murakami-jō ato	Murakami	Edo period castle	Murakami Castle Site	38°13′15″N 139°29′09″E	2	887
Chōjagahara Site 長者ヶ原遺跡 Chōjagahara iseki	Itoigawa	Jōmon period settlement trace	Chōjagahara Site	37°01′38″N 137°51′55″E	1	868
Chōjagadaira Site 長者ヶ平遺跡 Chōjagadaira iseki	Sado	Jōmon period settlement trace		37°49′13″N 138°14′04″E	1	885
Fujihashi Site 藤橋遺跡 Fujihashi iseki	Nagaoka	Jōmon period settlement trace	Fujihashi Site	37°25′41″N 138°46′56″E	1	877
Umataka-Sanjūinaba Site 馬高・三十稲場遺跡 Umataka-Sanjūinaba iseki	Nagaoka	Jōmon period settlement trace	Umataka-Sanjūinaba Site	37°26′49″N 138°46′00″E	1	878
Hachimanbayashi Kanga ruins 八幡林官衙遺跡 Hachimanbayashi kanga iseki	Nagaoka	Asuka period government complex		37°34′47″N 138°45′28″E	2	889
Hida Sites 斐太遺跡群 Hida iseki-gun	Myōkō	Yayoi though Kofun period settlement traces; designation includes the Fukiage Site (吹上遺跡), Hida Site (斐太遺跡), and Kamabuta Site (釜蓋遺跡)	Hida Sites	37°03′20″N 138°14′03″E	1	873
Hirabayashi Castle ruins 平林城跡 Hirabayashi-jō ato	Murakami	Sengoku period castle ruins	Hirabayashi Castle Site	38°08′10″N 139°28′47″E	2	876
Niitsu Oil Field Kanazu Well Site 新津油田金津鉱場跡 Niitsu yuden Kanazu kōjō ato	Akiha-ku, Niigata	Meiji period oil well	Niitsu Oil Field Kanazu Well	37°45′00″N 139°06′55″E	6	00004040
Jōnoyama Kofun 城の山古墳 Jōnoyama kofun	Tainai	Kofun period tumulus	Jōnoyama Kofun	38°02′33″N 139°22′22″E	1	00004058
Motonoki-Tazawa Sites 本ノ木・田沢遺跡群 Motonoki・Tazawa iseki-gun	Tōkamachi, Tsunan	designation includes the Motonoki Site (本ノ木遺跡), Tazawa Site (田沢遺跡), and Jin Site (壬遺跡)		37°02′51″N 138°40′29″E	1	00004083

== Prefectural Historic Sites ==
As of 1 May 2020, forty-six Sites have been designated as being of prefectural importance.

Site	Municipality	Comments	Image	Coordinates	Type	Ref.
Niibo Jewellery Workshop Site 新穂玉作遺跡; Niibo tama-tsukuri iseki	Sado			38°00′53″N 138°25′00″E		for all refs see
Kariwa Shell Mound 刈羽貝塚; Kariwa kaizuka	Kariwa			37°25′16″N 138°38′07″E		
Sugawara Kofun 菅原古墳; Sugawara kofun	Jōetsu			37°04′26″N 138°19′37″E		
Ryōkan Birth Place (Tachibana-ya Site) 良寛生誕地 (橘屋跡); Ryōkan seitan-chi (Tachibanaya ato)	Izumozaki	near the Ryōkan Memorial Museum (良寛記念館, Ryōkan kinenkan)		37°32′31″N 138°41′14″E		
Ryōkan Study Sites (Gogō-an Precinct, Otoko Jinja Precinct) 良寛修業地 (五合庵境内、乙子神社境内); Ryōkan shūgyō-chi (Gogō-an keidai, Otoko Jinja keidai)	Tsubame			37°39′44″N 138°48′44″E		
Ryōkan Demise Sites (Kimura Family House, Ryūsen-ji Cemetery) 良寛終焉地 (木村家邸域、隆泉寺墓地); Ryōkan shūenchi (Kimura-ke tei-iki, Ryūsenji bochi)	Nagaoka			37°34′55″N 138°46′13″E		
Sōma Gyofū Residence 相馬御風宅; Sōma Gyofū taku	Itoigawa			37°02′46″N 137°51′40″E		
Mikuni Kaidō Waki Honjin Site (Ikeda-ya) 三国街道脇本陣跡池田家; Mikuni Kaidō waki honjin ato (Ikeda-ya)	Yuzawa			36°53′42″N 138°46′41″E		
Yoita Castle Site 与板城跡; Yoita-jō ato	Nagaoka			37°32′02″N 138°48′03″E		
Takada Castle Site 高田城跡; Takada-jō ato	Jōetsu			37°06′36″N 138°15′22″E		
Kodomari Sue Ware Kiln Sites 小泊須恵器窯跡群; Kodomari sue-ki kama ato-gun	Sado			37°52′48″N 138°17′55″E		
Hamochi Castle Site 羽茂城跡; Hamochi-jō ato	Sado			37°50′37″N 138°19′07″E		
Aikawa Mine Site 相川鉱山遺跡; Aikawa kōzan iseki	Sado			38°02′45″N 138°14′15″E		
Nōmine Castle Site 直峰城跡; Nōmine-jō ato	Jōetsu			37°08′24″N 138°27′02″E		
Tochio Castle Site 栃尾城跡; Tochio-jō ato	Nagaoka			37°28′25″N 138°59′15″E		
Suyoshi Castle Site 栖吉城跡; Suyoshi-jō ato	Nagaoka			37°25′34″N 138°53′53″E		
Tsugawa Castle Site 津川城跡; Tsugawa-jō ato	Aga			37°41′06″N 139°27′34″E		
Amase Oil Field No.1 Well Site 尼瀬油田機械掘第1号井跡; Amase yuden kikaiku daiichi-gō i ato	Izumozaki			37°32′20″N 138°40′44″E		
Kabanosawa Castle Site 樺沢城跡; Kabanosawa-jō ato	Minami-Uonuma			37°01′35″N 138°49′46″E		
Fujitsuka Shell Mound 藤塚貝塚; Fujitsuka kaizuka	Sado			37°57′56″N 138°21′00″E		
Shiiya Jin'ya Site 椎谷陣屋跡; Shiiya jinya ato	Kashiwazaki			37°28′33″N 138°37′09″E		
Iizunayama Kofun Cluster 飯綱山古墳群; Iizunayama kofun-gun	Minami-Uonuma			37°04′29″N 138°52′09″E		
Arikoyama Kofun Cluster 蟻子山古墳群; Arikoyama kofun-gun	Minami-Uonuma			37°05′02″N 138°52′10″E		
Echigo Government Offices Site 越後府跡(天朝山); Echigo-fu (Tenchō-yama)	Agano			37°50′15″N 139°13′37″E		
Iwayasan Cave 岩屋山石窟; Iwayasan sekkutsu	Sado			37°48′44″N 138°14′57″E		
Mano Kofun Cluster 真野古墳群; Mano kofun-gun	Sado			37°56′29″N 138°18′39″E		
Igarashi Fortified Residence Site 五十嵐館跡; Igarashi tate ato	Sanjō			37°34′17″N 139°02′50″E		
Yasuda Castle Site 安田城跡; Yasuda-jō ato	Agano			37°46′26″N 139°14′14″E		
Shimohata Jewellery Workshop Site 下畑玉作遺跡; Shimohata tama tsukuri iseki	Sado			38°00′00″N 138°22′39″E		
Niibo Castle Site 新穂城跡; Niibo-jō ato	Sado			38°00′52″N 138°24′25″E		
Daigahana Kofun 台ケ鼻古墳; Daigahana kofun	Sado			37°57′56″N 138°15′15″E		
Hamahata Cave Site 浜端洞穴遺跡; Hamahata dōkestu iseki	Sado			37°59′55″N 138°14′07″E		
Arato Castle Site 荒戸城跡; Arato-jō ato	Yuzawa			36°54′27″N 138°47′32″E		
Shitakurayama Castle Site 下倉山城跡; Shitakurayama-jō ato	Uonuma			37°14′38″N 138°57′02″E		
Aoki Castle Site 青木城跡; Aoki-jō ato	Sado			38°01′19″N 138°25′21″E		
Ōida Castle Site 大井田城跡; Ōida-jō ato	Tōkamachi			37°09′44″N 138°46′50″E		
Yokotakiyama Haiji Site 横滝山廃寺跡; Yokotakiyama Haiji ato	Nagaoka			37°37′08″N 138°49′03″E		
Kagohō Site 籠峰遺跡; Kagohō iseki	Jōetsu			36°56′46″N 138°12′56″E		
Motoyoita Castle Site 本与板城跡; Motoyoita-jō ato	Nagaoka			37°33′02″N 138°48′25″E		
Nechi Castle Site 根知城跡; Nechi-jō ato	Itoigawa			36°57′23″N 137°52′19″E		
Matoba Site 的場遺跡; Matoba iseki	Niigata			37°51′43″N 138°59′41″E		
Choritsu Site 緒立遺跡; Choritsu iseki	Niigata			37°51′34″N 138°59′10″E		
Ōbasawa Castle Site 大葉沢城跡; Ōbasawa-jō ato	Murakami			38°14′35″N 139°31′46″E		
Ogawa Battery Site 小川台場跡; Ogawa daiba ato	Sado			38°03′43″N 138°14′07″E		
Baba Fortified Residence Site 馬場館跡; Baba-date ato	Murakami			38°07′45″N 139°25′41″E		
Imai Castle Site 今井城跡; Imai-jō ato	Tsunan			36°59′19″N 138°36′56″E		

== Municipal Historic Sites ==
As of 1 May 2020, a further two hundred and eighty-six Sites have been designated as being of municipal importance.

== See also ==
- Cultural Properties of Japan
- Echigo Province
- Sado Province
- Niigata Prefectural Museum of History
- List of Places of Scenic Beauty of Japan (Niigata)
- List of Cultural Properties of Japan - paintings (Niigata)
