= Miyaguchi Kofun Group =

- 宮口古墳群 (Japanese)
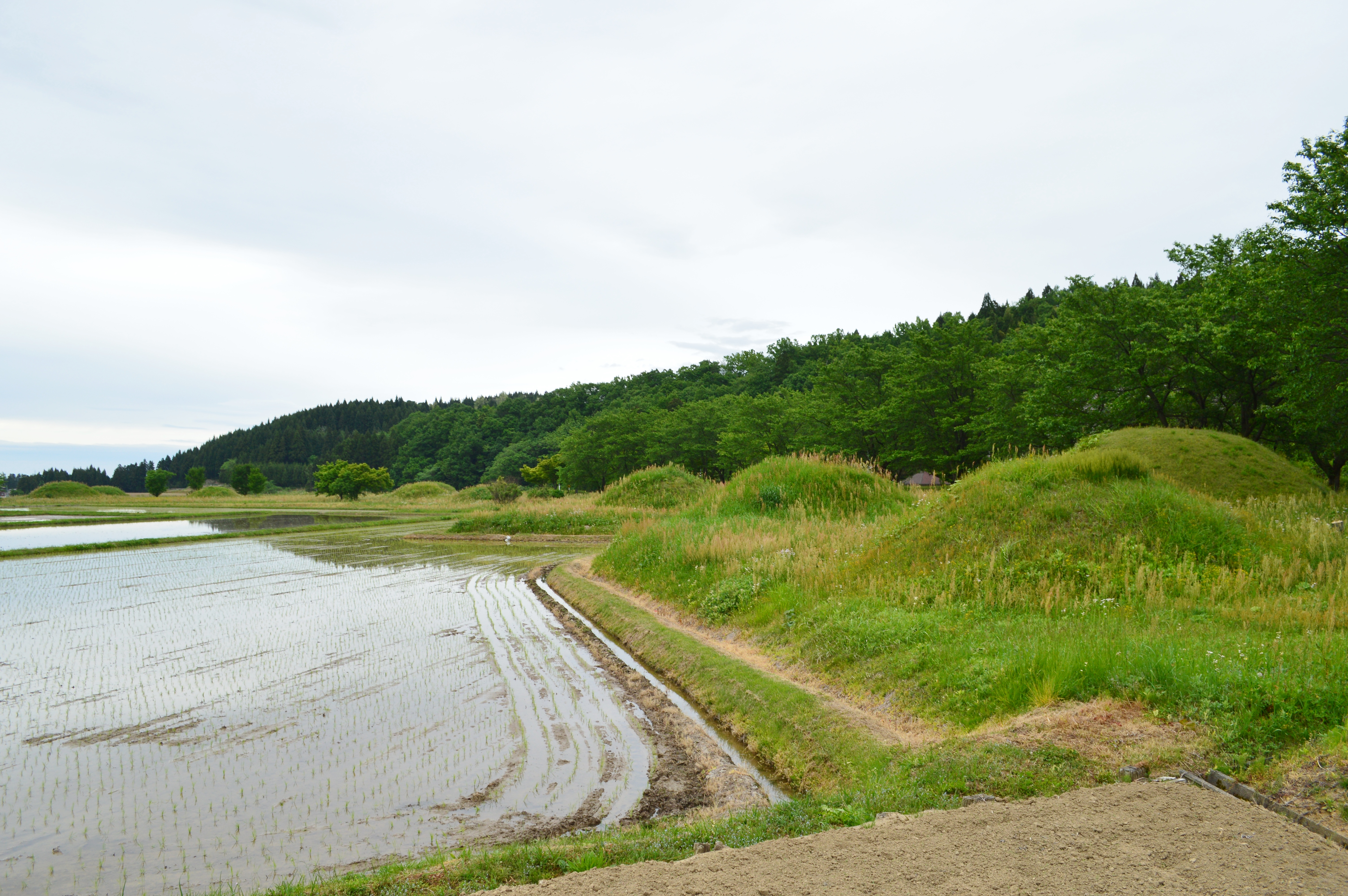
- Miyaguchi Kofun

- Miyaguchi Kofun Group Miyaguchi Kofun Group (Japan)
- 37°05′36″N 138°21′27″E
- Type: Kofun
- Periods: Kofun period
- Location: Jōetsu, Niigata, Japan
- Region: Hokuriku region

History
- Built: mid 6th to early 7th century

Site notes
- Area: 13,199.56 m^{2} (142,078.9 sq ft)
- Excavation dates: 1973
- Discovered: 1929
- Public access: Yes (park and museum)

The Miyaguchi Kofun Group (宮口古墳群, Miyaguchi Kofun-gun) is an archaeological site containing three groups of late Kofun period burial mounds located in the Miyaguchi neighborhood of the city of Jōetsu, Niigata in the Hokuriku region of Japan. The site was designated a National Historic Site of Japan in 1976.

== Overview ==
The Miyaguchi Kofun Group is located in the Takada Plains of the Jōetsu region of Niigata Prefecture, on the alluvial fan of the Inada River near the Sea of Japan. The site was discovered in 1929, and archaeological excavations were conducted from 1973. The site consists of three groups of kofun. Site A was found to contain 18 tumuli, Site B to the east was found to have eight tumuli, and Site C located slightly to the south of Site A was found to have five tumuli. All of the kofun were circular-type (empun (円墳)), with a diameter of four to five meters. All of the tumuli are concentrated in a small area of approximately 1.5 hectares.

Each of the tumuli had lateral burial chambers ranging from 70 to 140 cm in width and around two meters in length, with the largest, No.11, having a length of 6.6 meters.

Grave goods recovered include Sue ware, straight iron swords, parts of armor, horse fittings and items of jewellery. From these grave goods, it is estimated that these tombs were constructed from the middle of the 6th century to the middle of the 7th century.

The sites are open to the public as an open air archaeological park, and some of the artifacts found are displayed at the Maki History and Folklore Museum (牧歴史民俗資料, Maki rekishi minzoku shiryōkan) on site. It is a ten-minute walk from the "Miyaguchi" bus stop on the Echigo Kotsu Bus from Takada Station on the JR East Shin'etsu Main Line.

== Gallery ==
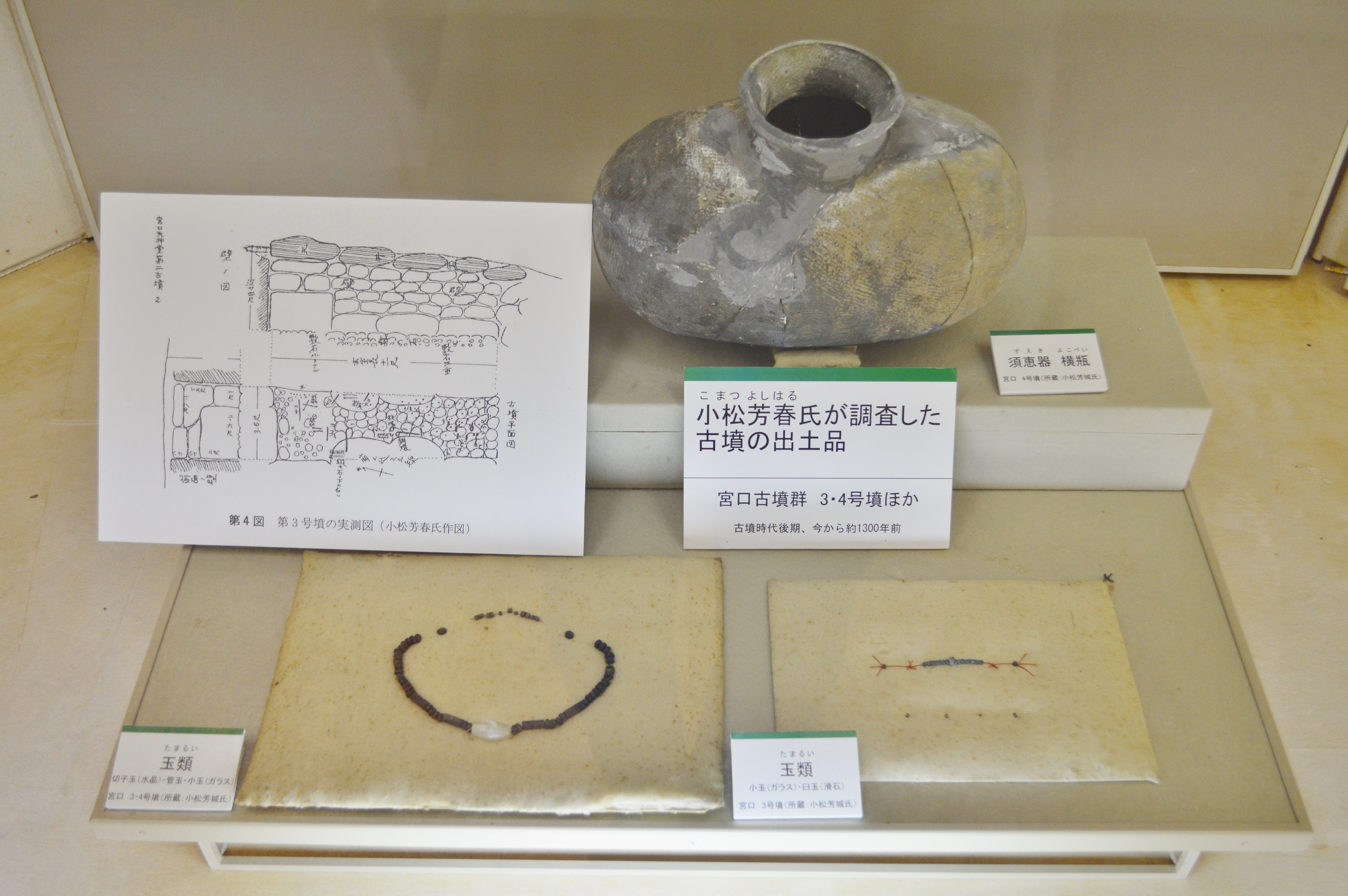
Excavated items from Tumulus No.3 and No.4

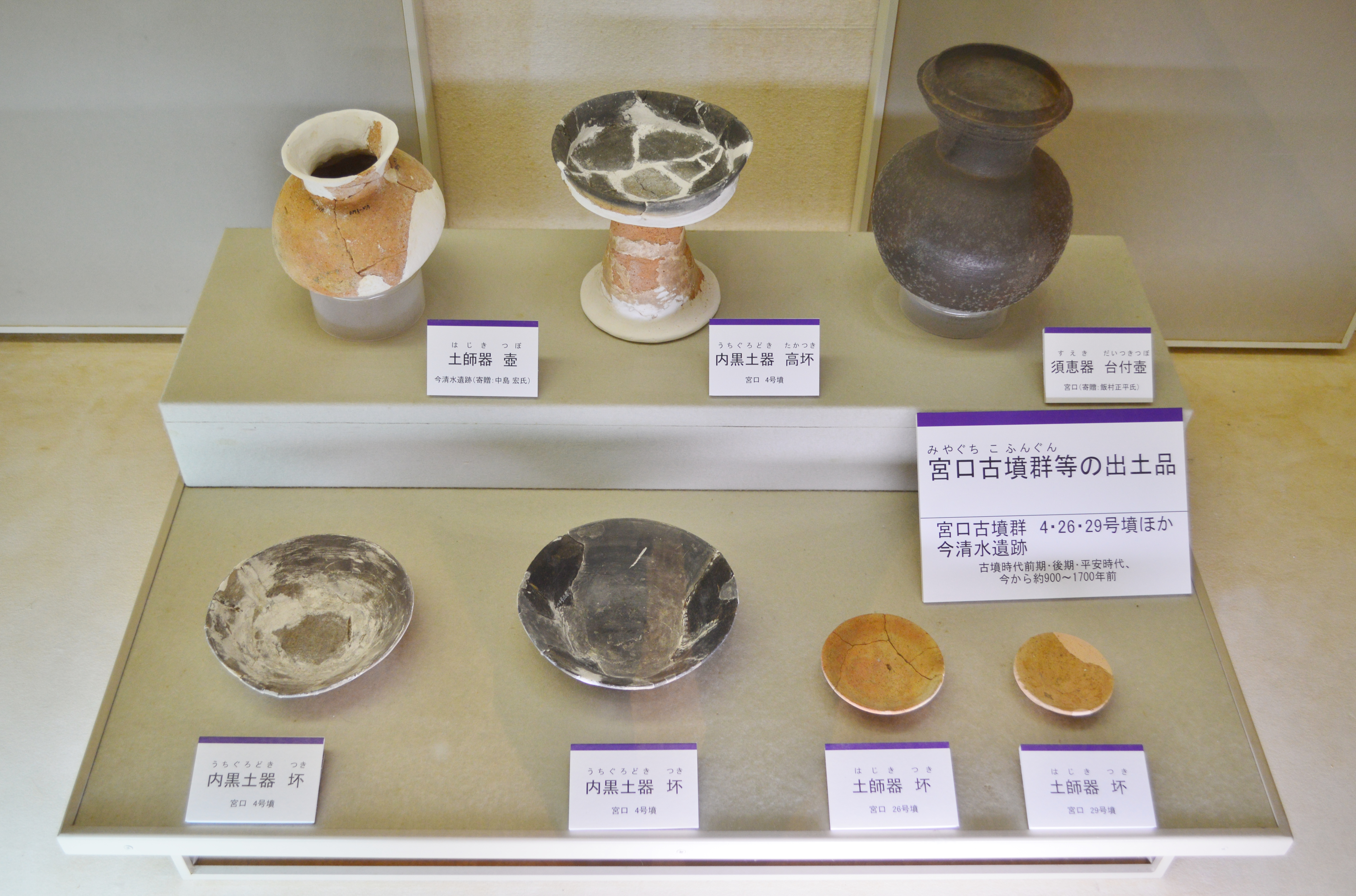
Excavated items from Tumulus No.4, No.26 and No.29

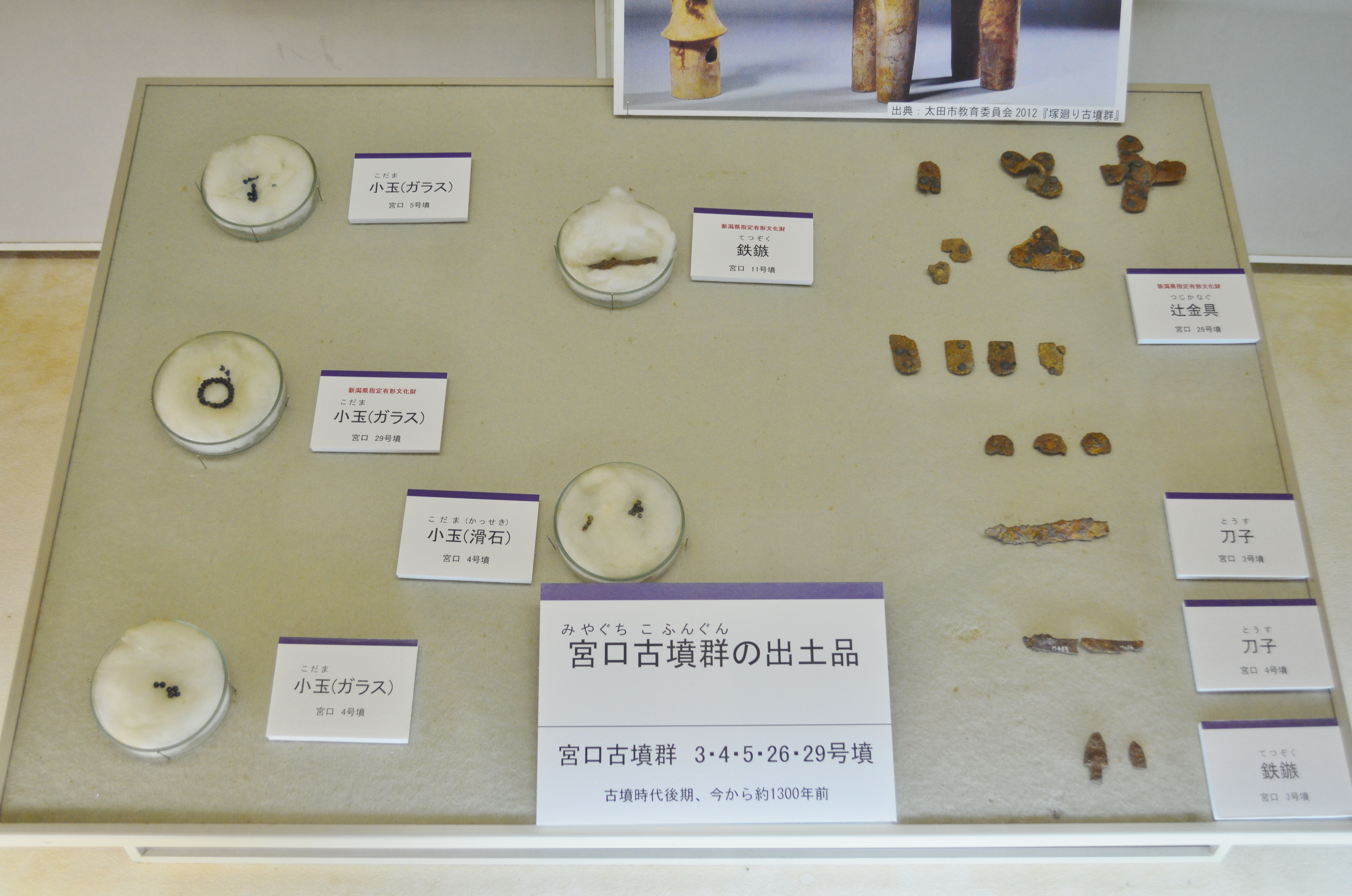
Excavated items from Tumulus No.3, No.4, No.5, No.26 and No.29

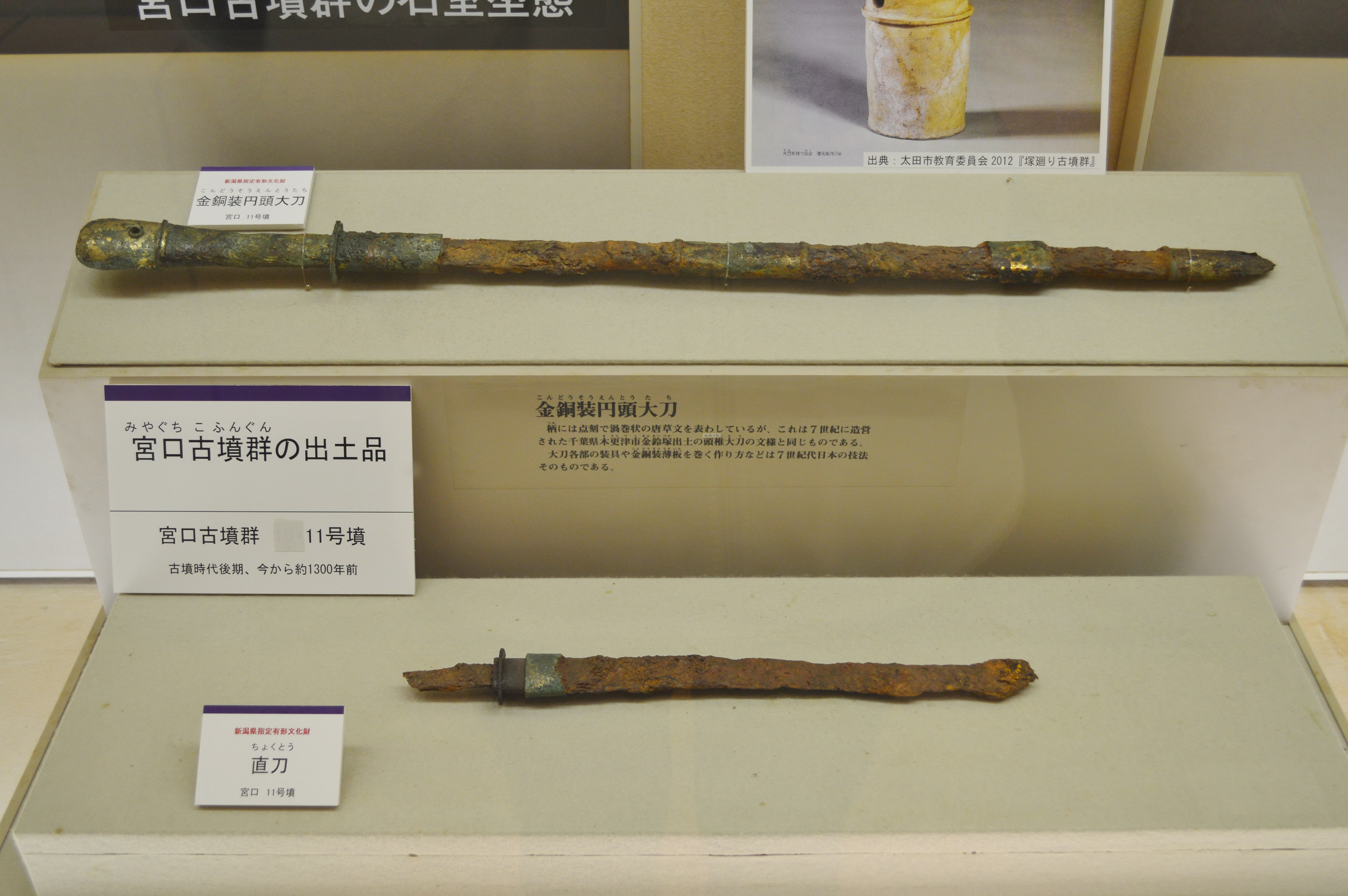
Excavated items from Tumulus No.11

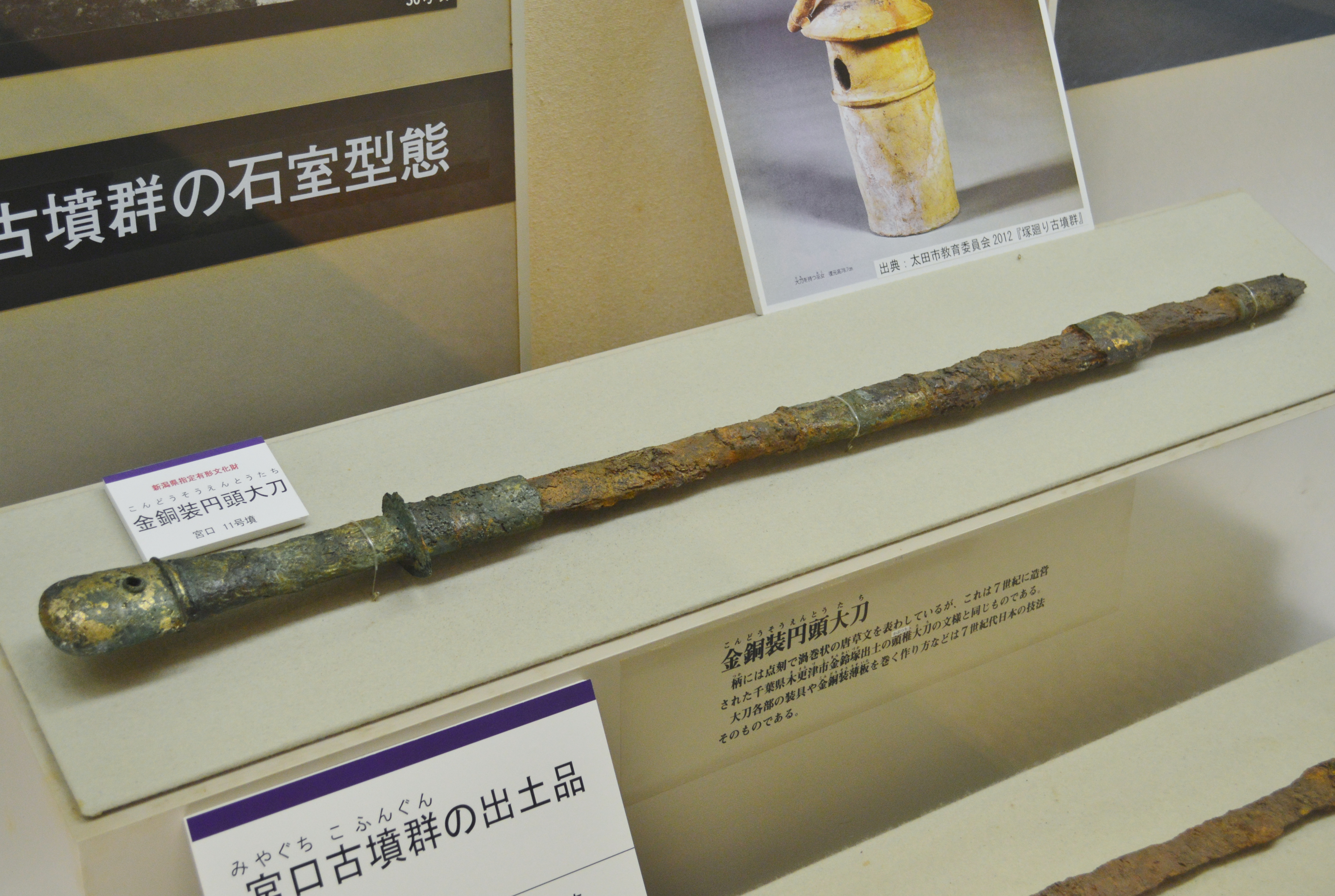
Excavated items from Tumulus No.11

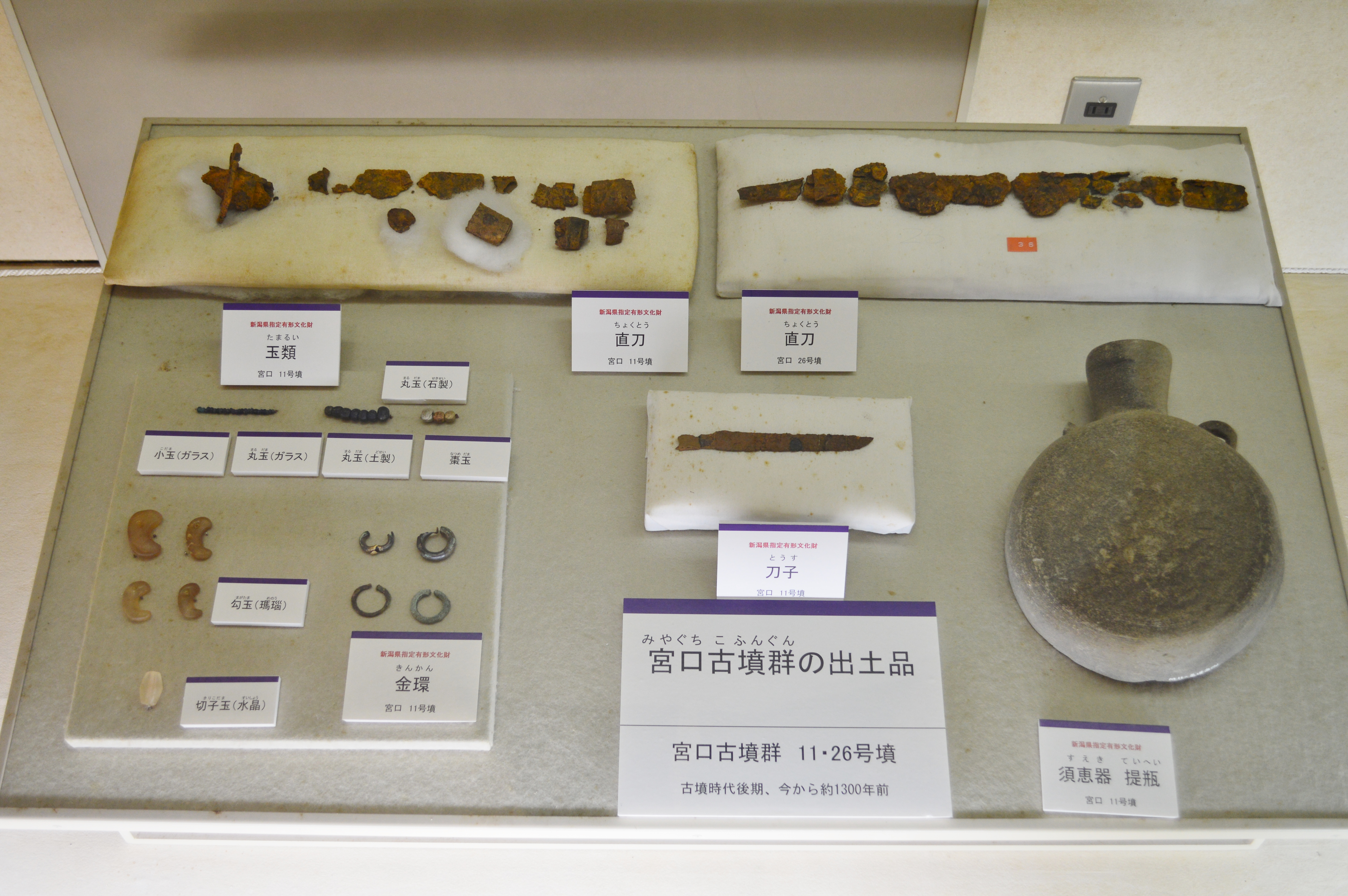
Excavated items from Tumulus No.11 and No.26

== See also ==
- List of Historic Sites of Japan (Niigata)
