= Niitsu Oil Field =

Oil extraction zone in Niigata Prefecture, Japan

Niitsu oil field
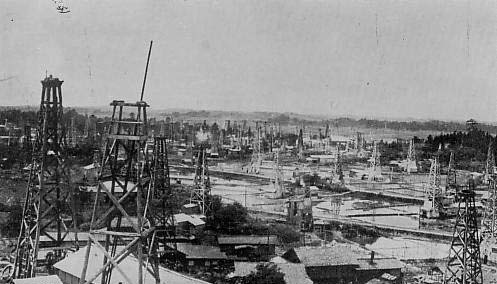
- Niitsu Oil Field in 1930s

- Location within Niigata Prefecture Location within Japan
- Country: Japan
- Region: Niigata Prefecture
- Location: Akiha-ku, Niigata
- Offshore/onshore: Onshore
- Coordinates: 37°45′0″N 139°06′49″E

Field history
- Discovery: Edo period
- Start of production: 1874
- Peak year: 1917
- Abandonment: 1996

The Niitsu Oil Field (新津油田, Niitsu Yuden) is the collective name for an oil extraction zone distributed in the southeastern hills of Akiha-ku, Niigata, Japan (formerly the city of Niitsu), covering an area of approximately 6 kilometers in width by 16 kilometers in length.

== Overview ==
Crude oil was discovered in Echigo Province from the end of the Nara period, occurring in naturally occurring petroleum seeps. In 1874, the Nakano clan, the local village headman, applied to the Meiji government for a permit to commercially mine the crude oil, and hand-pumping operations began almost immediately. This operation was later taken over by Nippon Oil (now JXTG Nippon Oil & Energy) and with the industrialization of Japan in the Meiji and Taisho periods, demand for petroleum skyrocketed and over 100 small companies began drilling for oil in this area.

The crude oil of Niitsu is deep black to deep green in color, with high viscosity, high sulfur and high acid content, and low in paraffin. In the early Meiji Era, when petroleum was in demand largely for lamps, Niitsu crude was regarded as poor quality. However, with the First Sino-Japanese War of 1894 and the Russo-Japanese War in 1904 and improvements in refining technology, Niitsu heavy oil and machine oil grew in demand.

By 1917, the field had reached its peak production of 120,000 kiloliters, and was the largest in Japan. Commercial production mostly stopped in the 1980s, due to decreasing yield and high costs compared with imported oil. In 1996, the last well was closed. and the site was subsequently transformed into a public park with a museum. In 2007, the Niitsu Oil Field was selected as one of the "Top 100 Geological Sites in Japan", and was designated as a “Modern Industrial Heritage Site”. In 2018, the “Niitsu Oilfield Kanazu Mining Site” was designated as a National Historic Site of Japan.

== See also ==
- List of Historic Sites of Japan (Niigata)
