= List of cultural properties of Japan – paintings (Niigata) =

This list is of the cultural properties of Japan designated in the category of paintings (絵画, kaiga) for the Prefecture of Niigata.

== National Cultural Properties ==
As of 1 July 2019, two Important Cultural Properties have been designated, being of national significance.

| Property | Date | Municipality | Ownership | Comments | Image | Dimensions | Coordinates | Ref. |
|---|---|---|---|---|---|---|---|---|
| Fudō Myōō with Two Attendants, colour on silk 絹本著色不動明王二童子像 kenpon chakushoku Fudō Myōō ni dōji zō | Kamakura period | Niigata | Hōkō-in (法光院) | | | | 37°55′19″N 139°04′19″E | |
| Plum Blossoms in Snow, ink on silk, by Wu Taisu 絹本墨画雪梅図〈呉太素筆／〉 kenpon bokuga setsubai zu (Gotaiso hitsu) | Yuan dynasty | Kashiwazaki | Teikan-en Preservation Society (貞観園保存会) | | | 42 centimetres (1 ft 5 in) by 72 centimetres (2 ft 4 in) | 37°13′38″N 138°38′16″E | |

== Prefectural Cultural Properties ==
As of 1 May 2019, sixteen properties have been designated at a prefectural level.

| Property | Date | Municipality | Ownership | Comments | Image | Dimensions | Coordinates | Ref. |
|---|---|---|---|---|---|---|---|---|
| Landscape, six-fold byōbu, by Kushiro Unzen 山水図 釧雲泉筆六曲屛風 sansui-zu Kushiro Unzen hitsu rokkyoku byōbu | 1808 | Tōkamachi | private | pair of screens | | | 37°07′21″N 138°45′16″E | for all refs see |
| Willows at Weicheng, by Ike no Taiga 渭城柳色 大雅筆 附 大雅書「渭城柳色」 Ijō ryūshoku Taiga hitsu tsuketari Taiga sho "ijō ryūshoku" | 1744 | Niigata | Tsurui Collection (kept at Tsurui Museum of Art (敦井美術館) | | | | 37°54′52″N 139°03′35″E | |
| Works by Kikuchi Yōsai 菊池容斎作品; Kikuchi Yōsai sakuhin" | late Edo period | Kashiwazaki | Teikan-en Preservation Society (貞観園保存会) | 49 items, comprising 18 hanging scrolls, 12 fusuma, 1 fan, 6 letters, 2 pairs of byōbu, 8 ranma paintings, and 2 folding books | | | 37°13′38″N 138°38′16″E | |
| Landscape with Snow by Okada Hanko 岡田半江、雪景山水図; Okada Hankō, sekkei sansui zu" | 1817 | Kashiwazaki | Teikan-en Preservation Society (貞観園保存会) | | | | 37°13′38″N 138°38′16″E | |
| Dharma Body of Expedient Means 方便法身尊像 hōben hosshin sonzō | early Muromachi period | Agano | Muishin-ji (無為信寺) | | | | 37°50′16″N 139°13′19″E | |
| Cranes, colour on gold ground, by Ganku 金地著彩群鶴図(板貼付)岸駒筆 konji chakusai gunkaku zu (itahari tsuke) Ganku hitsu | late Edo period | Tsubame | Gannōkaku (願王閣) | | | | 37°37′29″N 138°50′29″E | |
| Uesugi Kenshin with Two Retainers, colour on paper 紙本著色上杉謙信並二臣像 shihon chakushoku Uesugi Kenshin narabini ni shin zō | late Muromachi period | Nagaoka | Jōan-ji (常安寺) (kept at Niigata Prefectural Museum of Modern Art (新潟県立近代美術館)) | | | 150 centimetres (4 ft 11 in) by 54.5 centimetres (1 ft 9.5 in) | 37°27′52″N 138°49′56″E | |
| Three Thousand Buddhas, colour on silk 絹本著色三千仏図 kenpon chakushoku sanzen Butsu zu | 1466 | Niigata | Hōkō-in (法光院) | 3 hanging scrolls | | | 37°55′19″N 139°04′19″E | |
| Legends of Oppō-ji, colour on paper, emaki 紙本著色乙宝寺縁起絵巻 shihon chakushoku Oppōji engi emaki | 1810 | Tainai | Oppō-ji (乙宝寺) | | | 14.54 metres (47.7 ft) by 42.2 centimetres (1 ft 4.6 in) | 38°07′07″N 139°24′10″E | |
| Myōsenin, colour on silk 絹本著色妙泉院像 kenpon chakushoku Myōsenin zō | 1639 | Nagaoka | Shōkaku-ji (正覚寺) | | | 150 centimetres (4 ft 11 in) by 54.5 centimetres (1 ft 9.5 in) | 37°27′30″N 138°51′25″E | |
| Jion Daishi 慈恩大師像; Jion Daishi zō | late Kamakura period | Niigata | Hōkō-in (法光院) | | | 104.3 centimetres (3 ft 5.1 in) by 40.3 centimetres (1 ft 3.9 in) | 37°55′19″N 139°04′19″E | |
| Illustrated Biography of Hōnen Shōnin, colour on silk 絹本著色法然上人絵伝 kenpon chakushoku Hōnen shōnin e-den | Muromachi period | Jōetsu | Jōkō-ji (浄興寺) | 6 hanging scrolls | | 156.3 centimetres (5 ft 1.5 in) by 82.3 centimetres (2 ft 8.4 in) | 37°06′45″N 138°14′14″E | |
| Shōkō Oshō, colour on silk 絹本著色少康和尚像 kenpon chakushoku Shōkō oshō zō | early Muromachi period | Jōetsu | Jōkō-ji (浄興寺) | designation includes a copy of the same subject | | 87.2 centimetres (2 ft 10.3 in) by 36.3 centimetres (1 ft 2.3 in) | 37°06′45″N 138°14′14″E | |
| Scenes in and around the Capital, colour on paper with gold ground, byōbu 紙本金地著色洛中洛外図 六曲屛風 shihon kinji chakushoku rakuchū rakugai zu rokkyoku byōbu | early Edo period | Sado | Myōhō-ji (妙法寺) | pair of six-panel screens | | 153 centimetres (5 ft 0 in) by 370 centimetres (12 ft 2 in) | 38°04′49″N 138°26′09″E | |
| Thirty-six Immortals of Poetry 三十六歌仙絵扁額 sanjūrokkasen e-hengaku | early Edo period | Sado | Matsumae Jinja (松前神社) (kept at Sado Museum (佐渡博物館)) | 35 plaques; Kishi Joō pictured | | 45 centimetres (1 ft 6 in) by 32 centimetres (1 ft 1 in) | 37°59′09″N 138°20′41″E | |
| Okina and Sanbasō, Thirty-six Immortals of Poetry 翁・三番叟絵扁額 三十六歌仙絵扁額; Okina・Sanbasō e-hengaku sanjūrokkasen e-hengaku | early Edo period | Sado | Jissō-ji (実相寺) (kept at Sado Museum (佐渡博物館)) | pair of plaques and 18 plaques | | 42 centimetres (1 ft 5 in) by 29 centimetres (11 in) | 37°59′09″N 138°20′41″E | |

== See also ==
- Cultural Properties of Japan
- List of National Treasures of Japan (paintings)
- Japanese painting
- List of Historic Sites of Japan (Niigata)
