= Fujihashi Site =

Jōmon period archaeological site in Nagaoka, Hokuriku, Japan

- 藤橋遺跡 (Japanese)
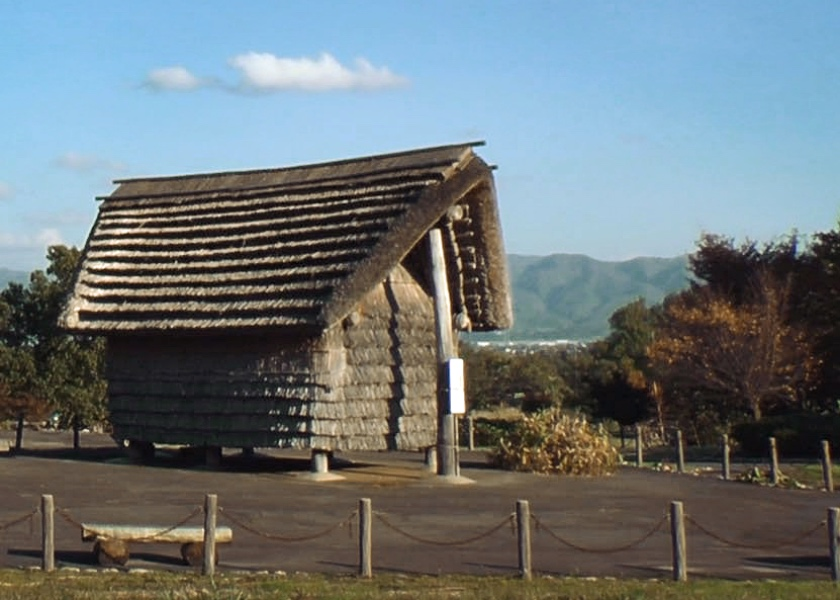
- Reconstructed dwelling at Fujihashi Site

- Fujihashi Site Fujihashi Site (Japan)
- 37°25′41″N 138°46′56″E
- Type: Settlement
- Periods: Jōmon period
- Location: Nagaoka, Niigata, Japan
- Region: Hokuriku region

Site notes
- Public access: Yes (archaeological park), museum

The Fujihashi Site (藤橋遺跡, Fujihashi Iseki) is an archaeological site containing the remnants of a late to final Jōmon period settlement located in the Nishizumachi neighborhood of the city of Nagaoka, Niigata in the Hokuriku region of Japan. It was designated a National Historic Site of Japan in 1978.

== Overview ==
The Fujihashi Site is located on a river terrace on the Shinano River and contains the ruins of a densely populated village from the late to final Jōmon period (3000 to 2000 years ago). The first archaeological survey of the site was conducted by the Nagaoka Municipal Science Museum in 1951, and several excavations have followed at later dates. In addition to various stone tools (including polished stone axes) and the foundations of pit dwellings and raised floor structures, a typical design of Jōmon pottery known as the "Fujihashi style" was discovered. Also found within the site was a production area for magatama and jadeite stone balls, with both unfinished and finished products. Pottery and jadeite balls from this site have been found in other areas of Japan, notably the Aizu area of southern Tōhoku, indicating that this village engaged in long distance trading.

The site is open to the public as an archaeological park with reconstructions of buildings, and includes the Fujihashi History Plaza (藤橋歴史の広場, Fujihashi Rekishi no Hiroba) - a museum containing models, panels, and restored excavated items. It is located about 25 minutes by bus from Nagaoka Station on the JR East Shin'etsu Main Line.

== See also ==
- List of Historic Sites of Japan (Niigata)
