= Ayamezuka Kofun =

Kofun period burial mound in Nishikan-ku, Japan

- 菖蒲塚古墳 (Japanese)
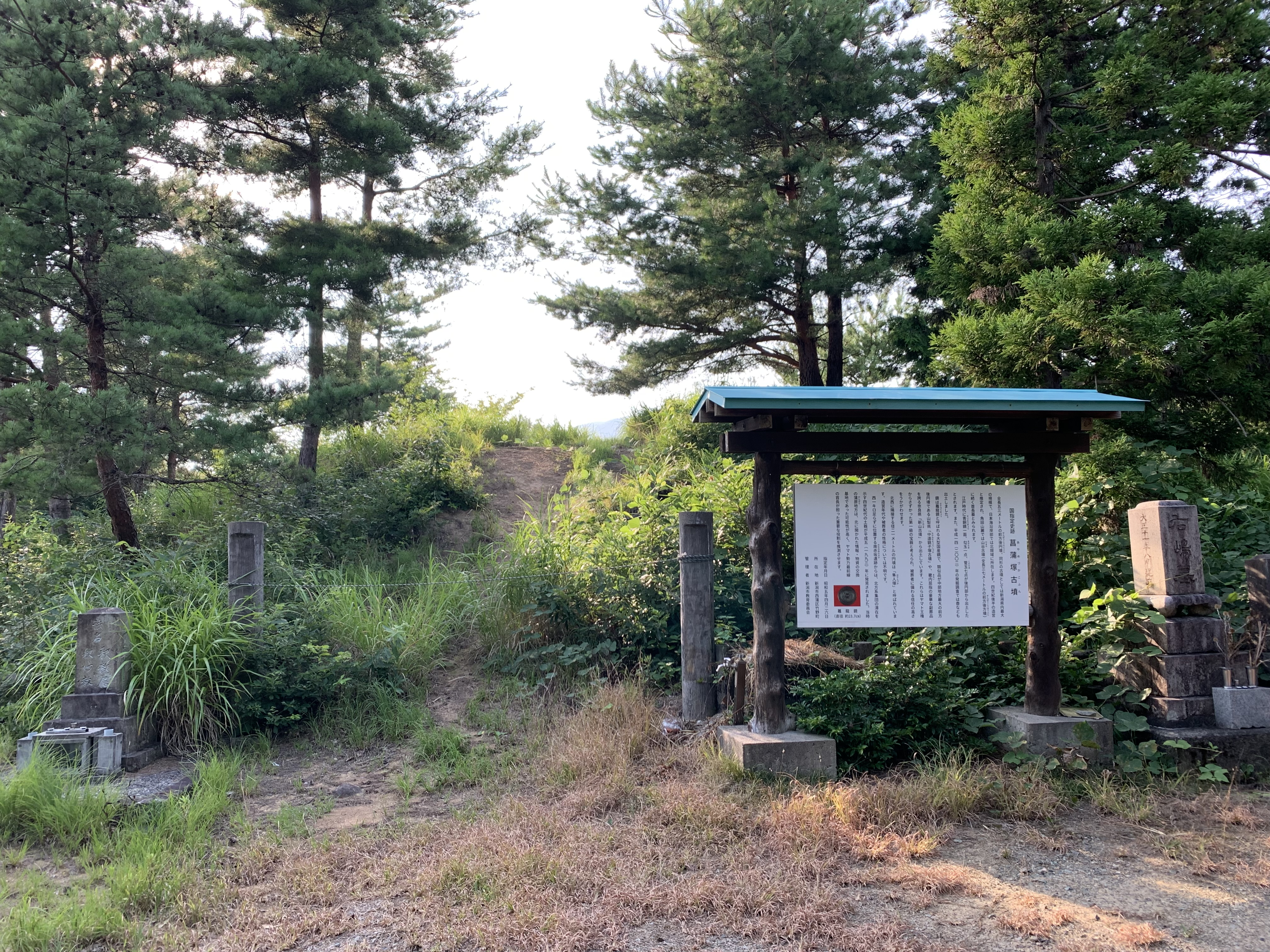

- Ayamezuka Kofun Ayamezuka Kofun (Japan)
- 37°46′00″N 138°51′57″E
- Type: Kofun
- Periods: Kofun period
- Location: Nishikan-ku, Niigata, Japan
- Region: Hokuriku region

History
- Built: 5th century AD

Site notes
- Public access: Yes (no public facilities)

The Ayamezuka Kofun (菖蒲塚古墳) is a keyhole-shaped kofun burial mound located in the Takenomachi neighborhood of Nishikan-ku, Niigata in the Hokuriku region of Japan. The tumulus was designated a National Historic Site of Japan in 1938.

== Overview ==
The Ayamezuka Kofun is located on the tip of a plateau on the east foot of Mount Kakuda, a 482-meter hill in far western Niigata city, within the grounds of a Buddhist temple called Kanzen-ji. It is a zenpō-kōen-fun (前方後円墳), which is shaped like a keyhole, having one square end and one circular end, when viewed from above. The tumulus has a total length of 53 meters, making it one of the largest in Niigata Prefecture, and marking the northern limit at which keyhole-shaped kofun have been found on the Sea of Japan coast. The posterior circular portion has a diameter of 33 meters and height of three meters, and the anterior rectangular portion has a width of 18 meters and height of two meters. The tumulus was surrounded by circumferential moat, with dirt from the moat used to partly construct the tumulus.

The internal structure of the kofun is not clear, and it appears that it did not have a stone-lined burial chamber, and as the tomb has been robbed in antiquity, the amount of surviving grave goods is minimal. The tomb was opened in 1812 during the Edo period, at which time a bronze mirror with a pattern of dragons was discovered. This mirror is 22.7 cm in diameter and is a Niigata Prefectural Important Cultural Asset. Other known artifacts include one jade magatama and seven cylindrical beads, and it was recorded in Edo period records that's some iron objects had been discovered. From these items, it is estimated that the tumuli dates from the 5th century. During the Edo period, local folklore attributed the tomb to the wife of Minamoto no Yorimasa, Ayame Gozen, hence the kofun's name.

It was excavated again in 2002 to 2003, during which time a number of pottery shards were found from the moat area. A number of the artifacts recovered from the tumulus are at the Niigata City History Museum and are collectively designated an Important Cultural Property of Niigata Prefecture.

There is another tumulus, the Hayatozuka Kofun (隼人塚古墳), a circular-type (empun (円墳)) with a diameter of 21 meters, located a short distance from the Ayamezuka Kofun. Also on the same plateau, 500 meters to the west, is the Minami-Akasaka Site, which contains traces of a settlement which was contemporary to the building of these two tumuli. Zoku-Jōmon period pottery from either Hokkaido or the northern Tōhoku region have been found at this site, indicating that at least a portion of its inhabitants were either from northern Japan, or had extensive interaction with the northern peoples. As the settlement and the kofun are contemporary, it is likely that the chieftains of the settlement was the builders of these tumuli.

The Ayamezuka Kofun was used as a sutra mound from the end of the Heian period to the Muromachi period, and the surviving sutras recovered from the site are collectively designated as National Important Cultural Property. The tumulus is located in a rural area about 30 minutes on foot from Maki Station on the JR East Echigo Line.

== See also ==
- List of Historic Sites of Japan (Niigata)
