= Sado Kokubun-ji =

- 佐渡国分寺
- Location within Niigata Prefecture Location within Japan

Religion
- Affiliation: Buddhist
- Deity: Yakushi Nyōrai
- Rite: Shingon

Location
- Location: Sado, Niigata
- Country: Japan
- Interactive map of Sado Kokubun-ji
- Coordinates: 37°58′00″N 138°22′01″E

Architecture
- Founder: Emperor Shōmu

The Sado Kokubun-ji (佐渡国分寺) is a Shingon sect Buddhist temple located in the city of Sado, Niigata, Japan. Its honzon is Yakushi Nyōrai. It is the successor to the Nara period kokubunji National Temples established by Emperor Shōmu for the purpose of promoting Buddhism as the national religion of Japan and standardising control of the imperial rule to the provinces. The archaeological site with the ruins of the ancient temple grounds for the provincial temple was designated as a National Historic Site in 1929.

== History ==
The Shoku Nihongi records that in 741, as the country recovered from a major smallpox epidemic, Emperor Shōmu ordered that a monastery and nunnery be established in every province, the kokubunji (国分寺).

The ruins of the original Sado Kokubun-ji are located to the west of the current temple. It is believed to have been built between 743 and 775. It is the oldest temple on Sado island and had a tiled roof, which was rare for the Hokuriku region. The foundation stones for the Kondō, Middle Gate, South Gate, cloister and a pagoda have been found. The layout mirrors that of the Tōdai-ji in Nara, the head temple of the kokubunji system, with the main buildings lined up in a single file from south to north, with the cloister connecting the Middle Gage and the Lecture Hall, and the pagoda located to the southeast of the Kondō. According to ancient records, the pagoda was a seven-story structure, and was destroyed after being hit by lightning during the Shōan era (1288-1301). The temple itself was burned down in 1529 during the conflicts of the Sengoku period.

During the early Edo Period, the temple was rebuilt on its current location, but on a much smaller scale. The Ryuri-do chapel was built in 1666. It is a 5 x 4 bay hall with a thatched irimoya-zukuri roof, repaired in 1793 and 1812 after being damaged by earthquakes. It houses an early Heian period statue of Yakushi Nyōrai, which the temple claims is the surviving honzon of the original temple. This statue has a height of 1.36 meters and was carved from a single block of wood. This statue was designed as a National Important Cultural Property in 1906.

Some 394 artifacts recovered during an archaeological excavation of them site, including roof tiles with an eight-petal lotus motif, have been collectively designated as a National Tangible Cultural Property in 2019.

The ancient temple site is currently being maintained as a historic park. It is located about 35 minutes by car from Ryōtsu Port.

== See also ==
- List of Historic Sites of Japan (Niigata)
- provincial temple
