= Ryōtsu, Niigata =

Ryōtsu 両津市
- Former municipality
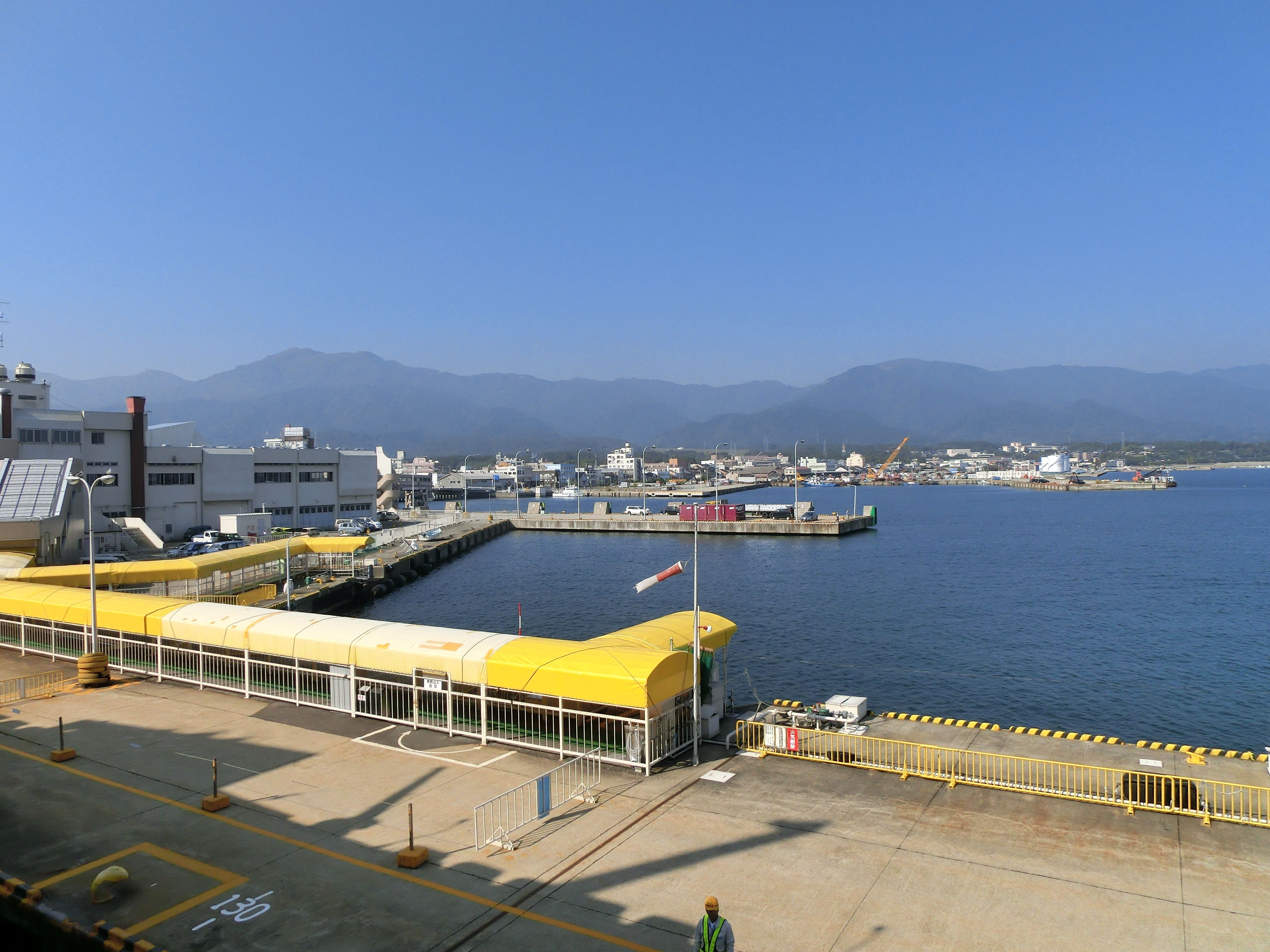
- Ryotsu Port

- Flag Seal
- Interactive map of Ryōtsu
- Country: Japan
- Region: Hokuriku
- Prefecture: Niigata Prefecture
- District: Sado District
- Merged: March 1, 2004 (now part of Sado)

Area
  - Total: 233.37 km^{2} (90.10 sq mi)

Population (2003)
  - Total: 16,710
- Time zone: UTC+09:00 (JST)
- Climate: Cfa

10 subdivisions (former municipalities) in the Sado City. Ryotsu is located on the east of the island.

Ryōtsu (両津市, Ryōtsu-shi) was a city located in Sado Island, Niigata Prefecture, Japan.

== Population ==
As of 2003, the city had an estimated population of 16,710 and a density of 71.60 persons per km^{2}. The total area was 233.37 km^{2}.

== History ==
The city was founded on November 3, 1954.

On March 1, 2004, Ryōtsu, along with the rest of Sado Island (the towns of Aikawa, Kanai, Sawata, Hatano, Mano, Hamochi and Ogi, and the villages of Niibo and Akadomari (all from Sado District)), was merged to create the city of Sado. Since then, Ryōtsu has been one of the 10 subdivisions of Sado City.

== Transportation ==
=== Bus ===
- Niigata Kotsu Sado

=== Highway ===
- National Route 350

=== Sea ===
- Ryōtsu Port
  - Sado Kisen Terminal
    - Car ferry and Jetfoil services to/from Niigata Port

== Local attractions ==
- Lake Kamo
- Onogame
- Futatsugame
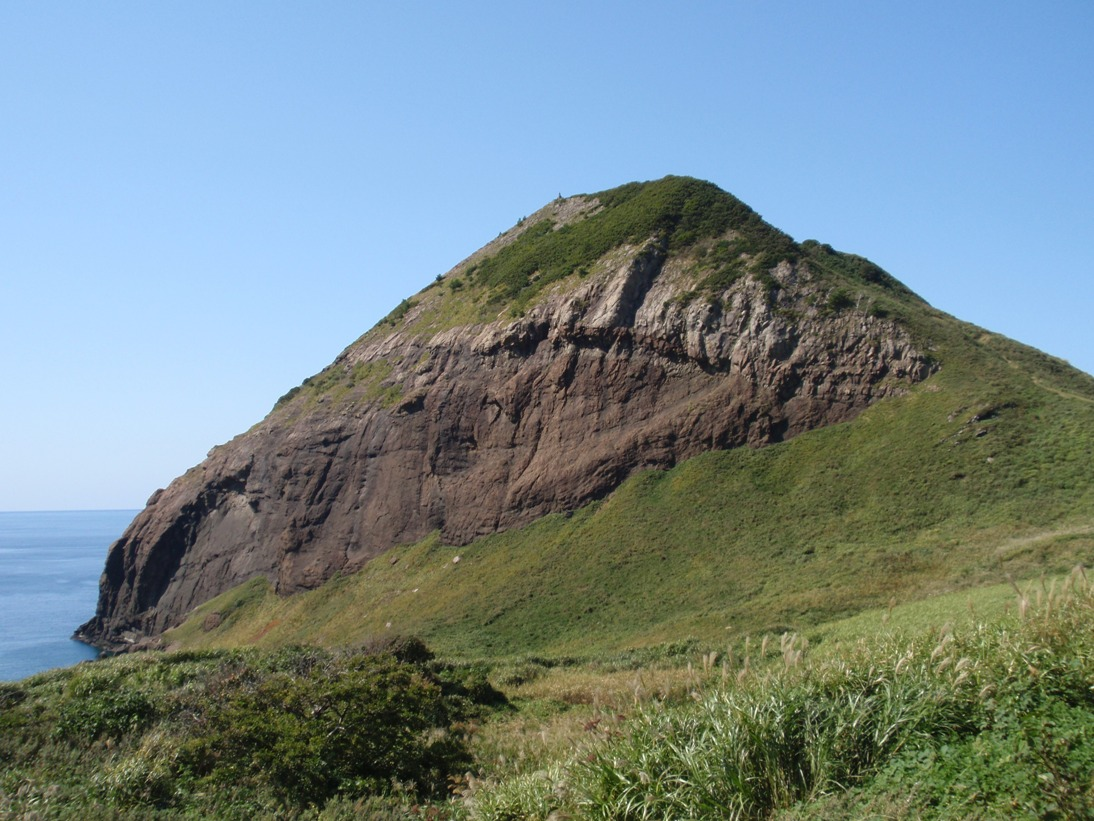
Onogame

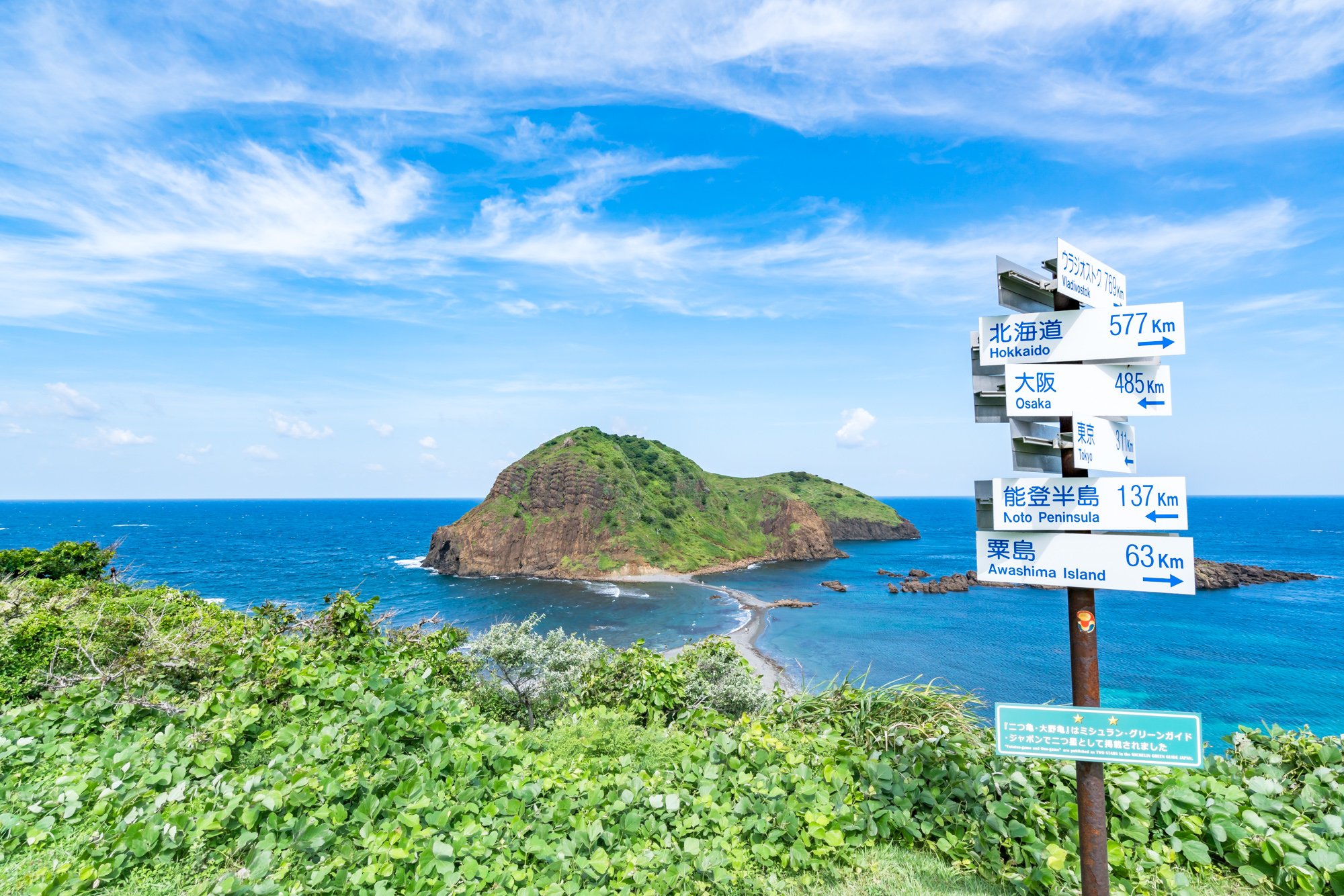
Futatsugame

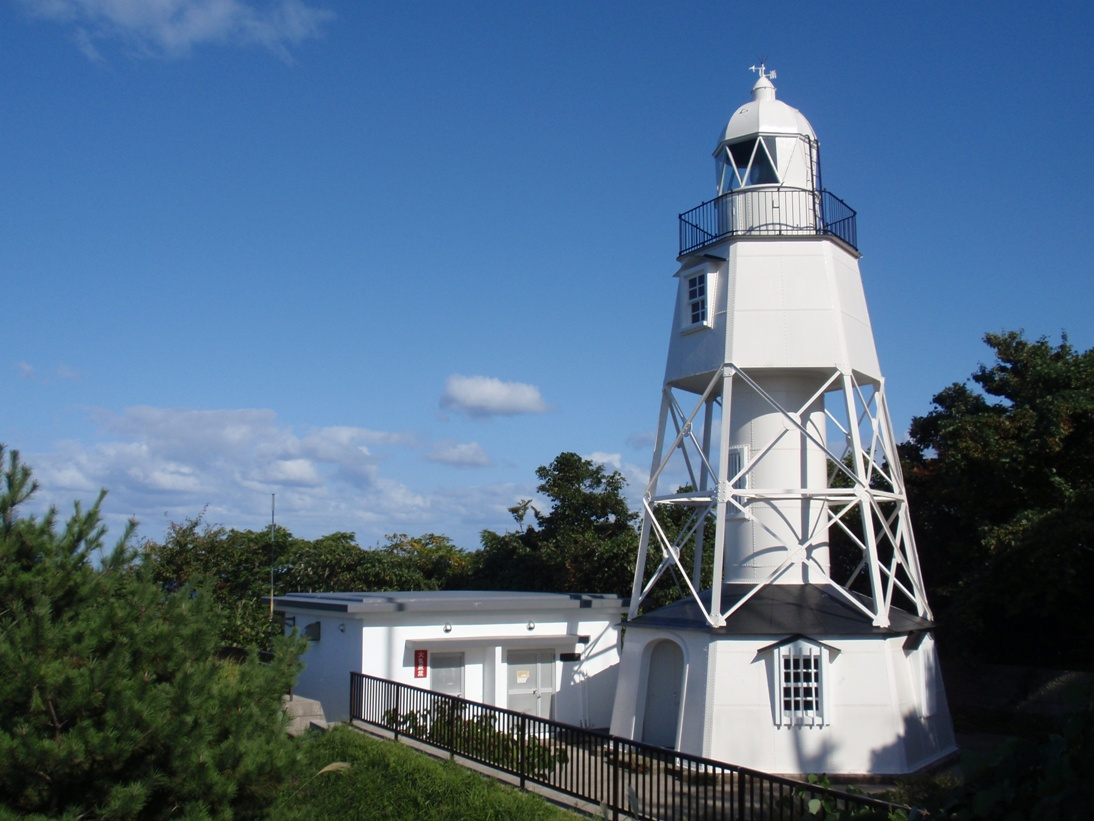
Himezaki Lighthouse

== Climate ==
Climate data for Ryōtsu (1991−2020 normals, extremes 1978−present)
Month	Jan	Feb	Mar	Apr	May	Jun	Jul	Aug	Sep	Oct	Nov	Dec	Year
Record high °C (°F)	14.5 (58.1)	19.9 (67.8)	23.3 (73.9)	26.9 (80.4)	29.0 (84.2)	31.7 (89.1)	37.7 (99.9)	38.8 (101.8)	38.2 (100.8)	29.5 (85.1)	24.7 (76.5)	19.0 (66.2)	38.8 (101.8)
Mean daily maximum °C (°F)	5.8 (42.4)	6.2 (43.2)	9.5 (49.1)	14.7 (58.5)	19.7 (67.5)	23.4 (74.1)	27.4 (81.3)	29.6 (85.3)	26.2 (79.2)	20.6 (69.1)	14.6 (58.3)	8.8 (47.8)	17.2 (63.0)
Daily mean °C (°F)	3.0 (37.4)	3.1 (37.6)	5.9 (42.6)	10.8 (51.4)	15.8 (60.4)	20.0 (68.0)	24.2 (75.6)	26.1 (79.0)	22.5 (72.5)	16.8 (62.2)	11.0 (51.8)	5.7 (42.3)	13.7 (56.7)
Mean daily minimum °C (°F)	0.2 (32.4)	0.0 (32.0)	2.2 (36.0)	6.9 (44.4)	12.2 (54.0)	17.0 (62.6)	21.5 (70.7)	23.0 (73.4)	19.2 (66.6)	13.1 (55.6)	7.3 (45.1)	2.5 (36.5)	10.4 (50.8)
Record low °C (°F)	−6.9 (19.6)	−7.1 (19.2)	−4.5 (23.9)	−1.0 (30.2)	3.6 (38.5)	10.4 (50.7)	13.8 (56.8)	16.4 (61.5)	10.8 (51.4)	3.7 (38.7)	−0.8 (30.6)	−4.6 (23.7)	−7.1 (19.2)
Average precipitation mm (inches)	164.3 (6.47)	118.7 (4.67)	109.1 (4.30)	104.6 (4.12)	107.3 (4.22)	138.9 (5.47)	233.2 (9.18)	142.7 (5.62)	136.7 (5.38)	139.2 (5.48)	155.2 (6.11)	210.0 (8.27)	1,758.5 (69.23)
Average precipitation days (≥ 1.0 mm)	23.0	18.1	15.7	11.7	9.7	9.3	11.4	9.1	11.4	12.9	16.9	22.7	171.9
Mean monthly sunshine hours	52.9	79.1	140.7	190.9	216.5	185.1	177.9	219.5	159.9	150.9	99.3	56.9	1,735.7
Source: Japan Meteorological Agency

== See also ==
- Sado, Niigata
