= Ogi, Niigata =

Ogi 小木町
- Former municipality
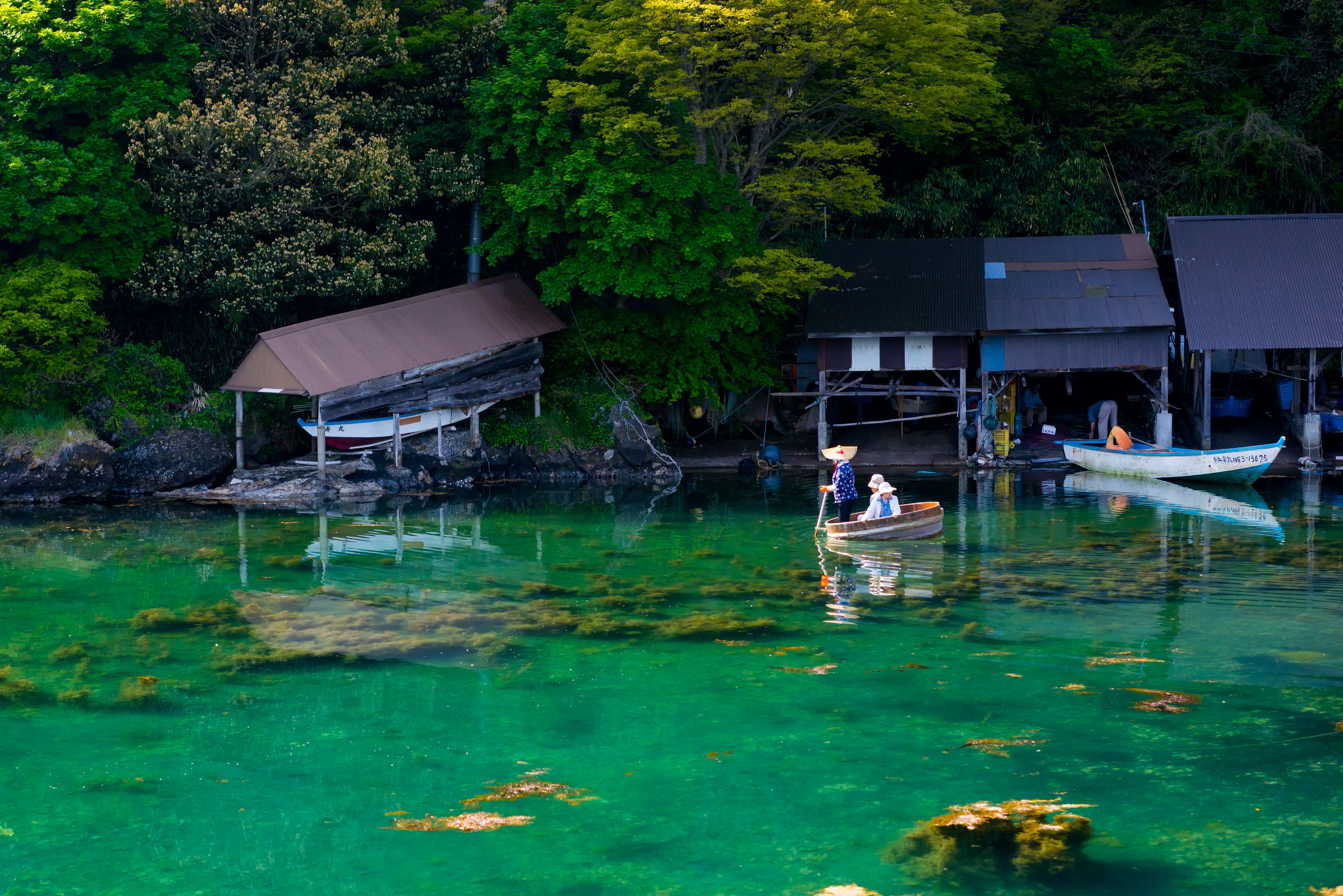
- People on a Tarai Bune

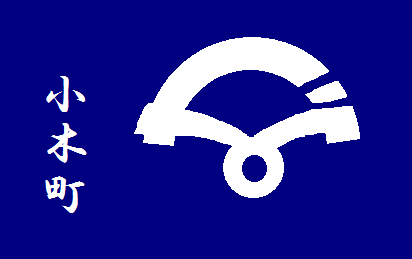
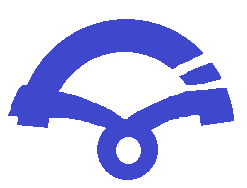
- Flag Seal
- Interactive map of Ogi
- Country: Japan
- Region: Hokuriku
- Prefecture: Niigata Prefecture
- District: Sado District
- Merged: March 1, 2004 (now part of Sado)

Area
  - Total: 25.95 km^{2} (10.02 sq mi)

Population (2000)
  - Total: 4,062
- Time zone: UTC+09:00 (JST)

10 subdivisions (former municipalities) in the Sado City. Ogi is located on the southwest of the island.

Ogi (小木町, Ogi-machi) was a town located in Sado Island, Niigata Prefecture, Japan.

On March 1, 2004, Ogi and the other 9 municipalities in the island were merged to create the city of Sado. Since then, Ogi has been one of the 10 subdivisions of Sado City.

== Transportation ==
=== Bus ===
- Niigata Kotsu Sado

=== Highway ===
- National Route 350

=== Sea ===
- Ogi Port
  - Sado Kisen Terminal
    - Car ferry services to/from Naoetsu Port (Jōetsu City)
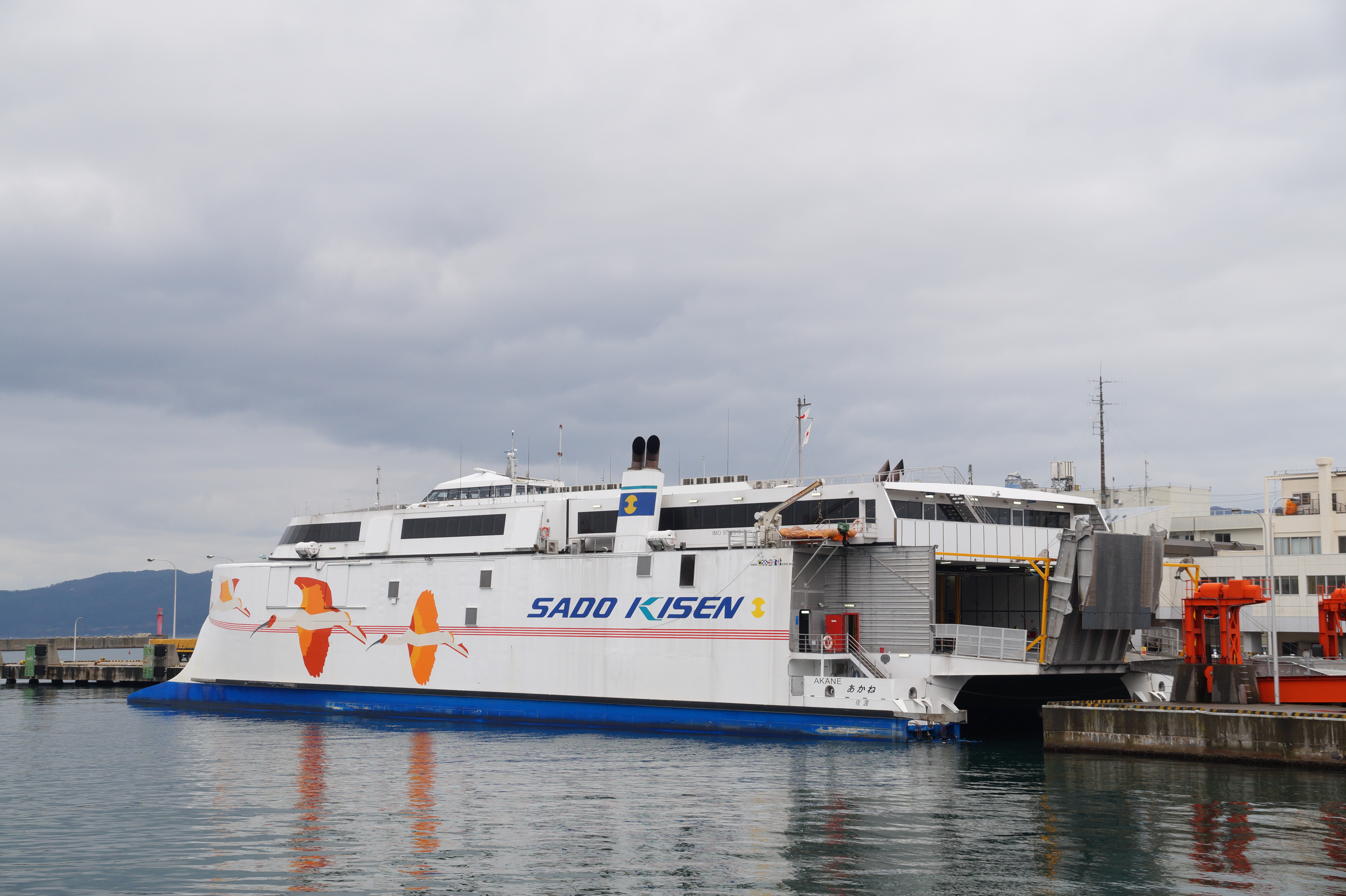
Car ferry Akane

== Local attractions ==
Video：Yajima, Kyojima

- Shukunegi (ja:宿根木)
- Tarai Bune
- Rengebuji temple
- Ogi Coast
  - Yajima, Kyojima
  - Kotoura Cave (Ryuodo Cave)
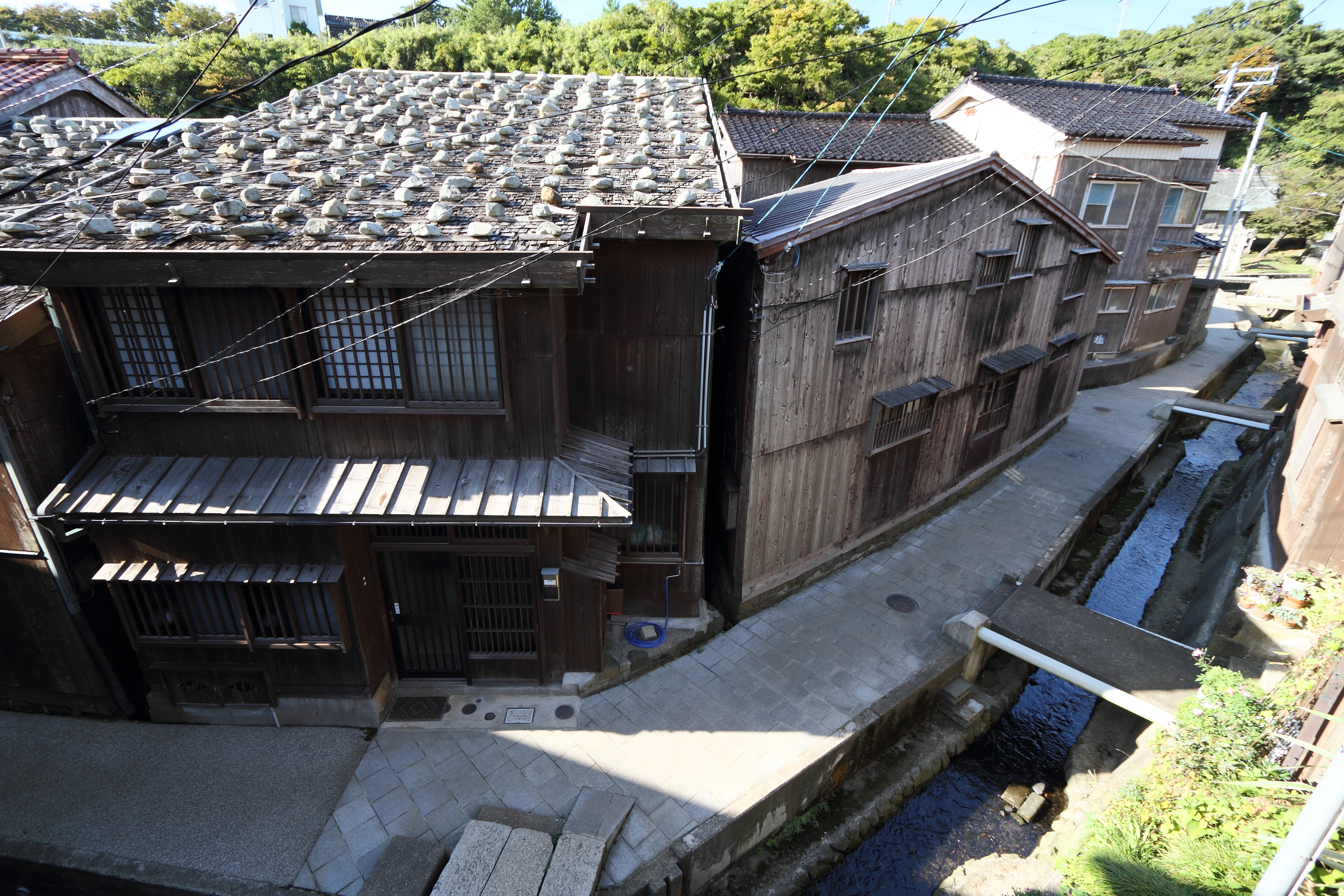
Shukunegi

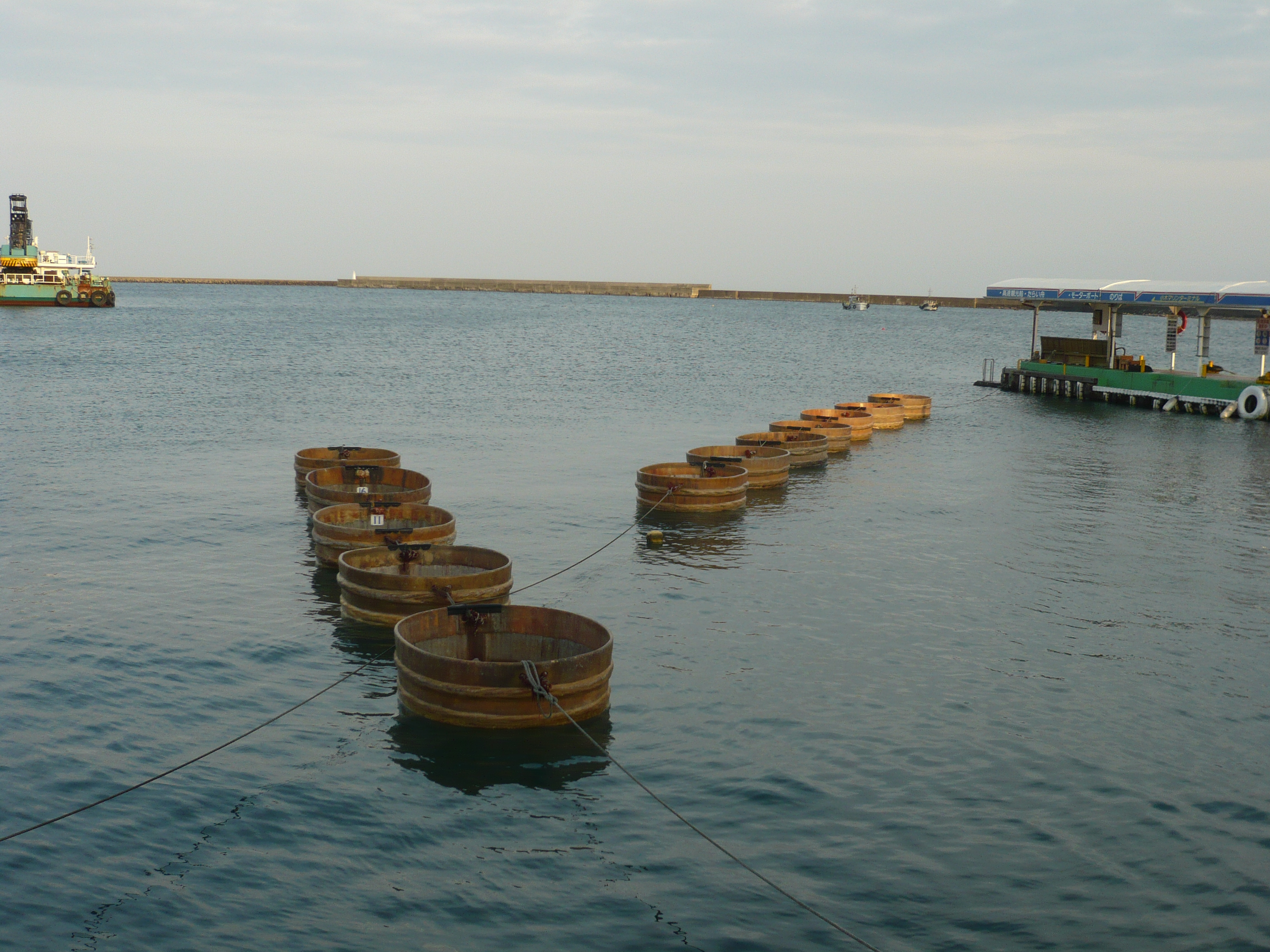
Tarai Bune in Ogi Port

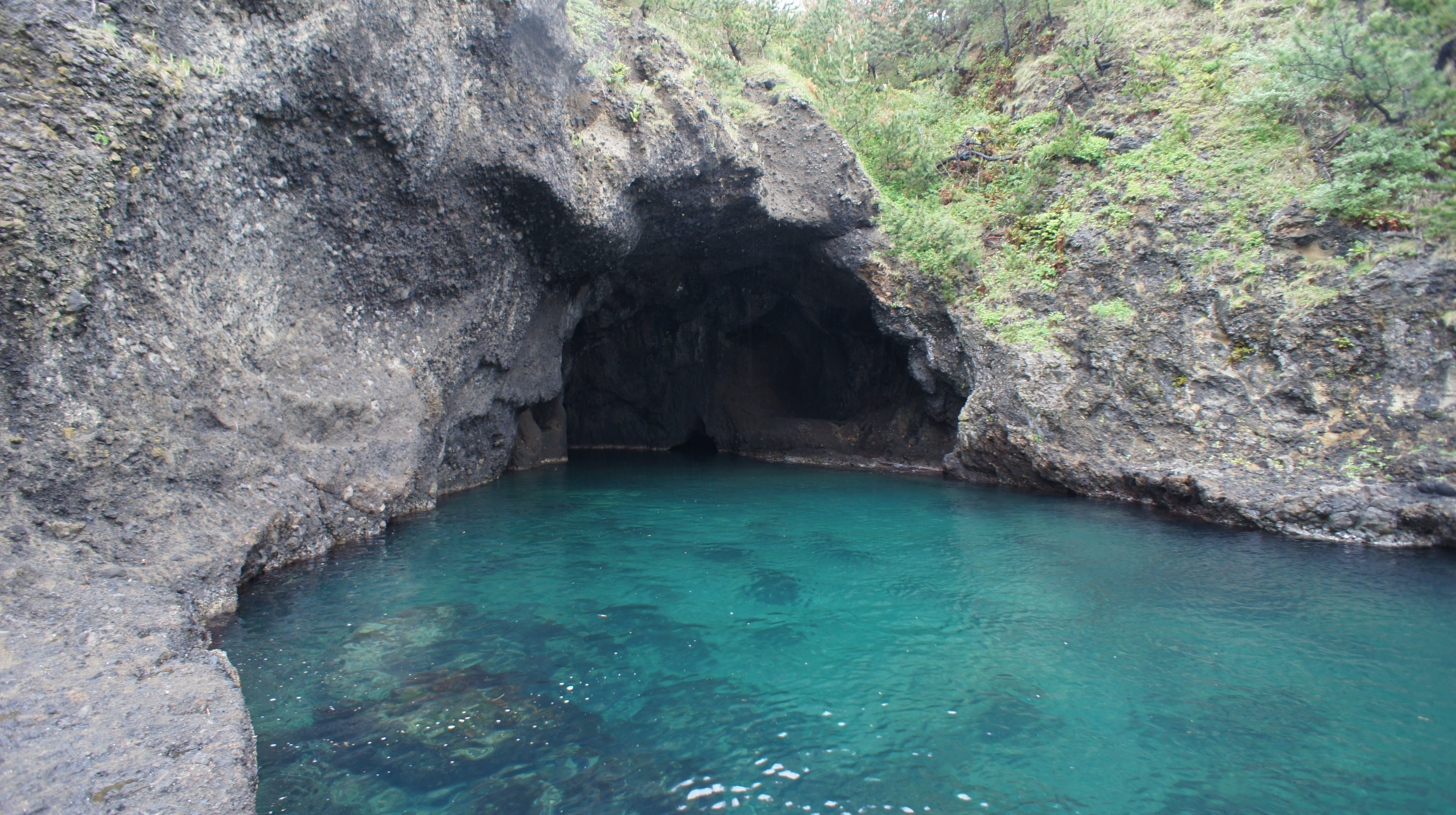
Kotoura Cave (Ryuodo Cave)

== See also ==
- Sado, Niigata
