= Sado District, Niigata =

Former district in Niigata prefecture, Japan

Sado (佐渡郡, Sado-gun) was a district located in Niigata Prefecture, Japan existing from 1896 by 2004.

The Sado District was formed on April 1 of 1896 from old three districts of Sawata, Hamochi and Kamo. The area was all Sado Island and the same to the Sado Province.

The district dissolved in March 2004 when the belonging towns and villages merged with the city of Ryōtsu to form the city of Sado. So the Sado Province, the Sado District and the Sado City has governed the same area with different status.

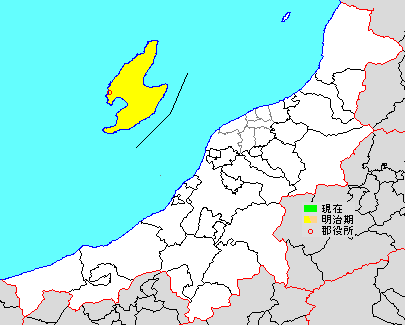
Location of former Sado-gun, Niigata Prefecture, highlighted in yellow.

It contained the following towns and villages before its abolition:

- Aikawa (town)
- Kanai (town)
- Sawata (town)
- Hatano (town)
- Mano (town)
- Hamochi (town)
- Ogi (town)
- Niibo (village)
- Akadomari (village)
