= Sawata, Niigata =

Sawata 佐和田町
- Former municipality
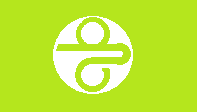
- Flag Seal
- Interactive map of Sawata
- Country: Japan
- Region: Hokuriku
- Prefecture: Niigata Prefecture
- District: Sado District
- Merged: March 1, 2004 (now part of Sado)

Area
  - Total: 47.7 km^{2} (18.4 sq mi)

Population (2004)
  - Total: 9,909
- Time zone: UTC+09:00 (JST)

10 subdivisions (former municipalities) in the Sado City. Sawata is located on the west of the island.

Sawata (佐和田町, Sawata-machi) was a town located in Sado Island, Niigata Prefecture, Japan.

On March 1, 2004, Sawata and the other 9 municipalities in the island were merged to create the city of Sado. Since then, Sawata has been one of the 10 subdivisions of Sado City.

== Transportation ==
=== Bus ===
- Niigata Kotsu Sado
  - Sawata Bus Station

=== Highway ===
- National Route 350

== See also ==
- Sado, Niigata
