= Japan National Route 350 =

National highway in Niigata Prefecture, Japan

National Route 350
- 国道350号

Route information
- Length: 51.9 km (32.2 mi)

Major junctions
- North end: National Route 116 in Chūō-ku, Niigata
- National Route 7; National Route 113; Niigata–Sado Ferry across the Sea of Japan; Sado–Jōetsu Ferry across the Sea of Japan
- South end: National Route 8 National Route 18 in Jōetsu

Location
- Country: Japan

Highway system
- National highways of Japan; Expressways of Japan
← National Route 349	→ National Route 351

National Route 350 (国道350号, Kokudō Sanbyaku gojūgō) is a national highway of Japan that traverses the prefecture of Niigata in a southwest–northeast routing. It connects the city of Jōetsu in southern Niigata Prefecture to the prefecture's capital city, Niigata, to the north along the Sea of Japan coastline; however the highway mainly functions as the main highway on Sado Island. It has a total length of 51.9 kilometers (32.2 mi) on land, but a total length of 163.2 kilometers (101.4 mi) with the distance traveled by the Sado Steam Ship across the Sea of Japan factored in.

== Route description ==
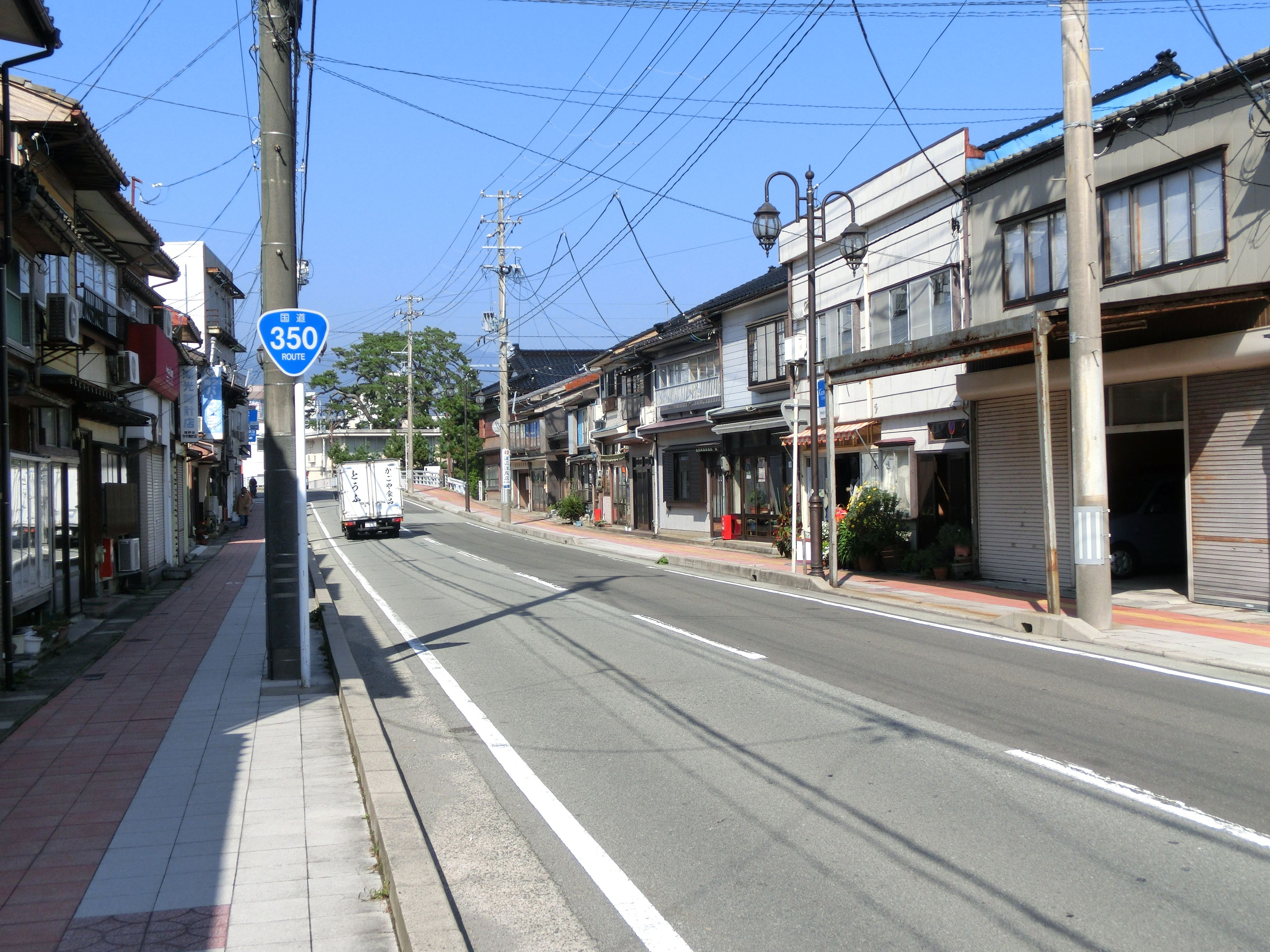
National Route 350 in Ryōtsu on Sado Island

National Route 350 mainly functions as the main highway on Sado Island; however, it is connected by roll-on/roll-off ferries that cross the Sea of Japan to its termini on Honshu at Jōetsu and Niigata. It has a total length of 51.9 kilometers (32.2 mi) on land, but a total length of 163.2 kilometers (101.4 mi) with the distance traveled by the Sado Steam Ship across the Sea of Japan factored in.

== History ==
The car ferry between Niigata and Ryōtsu commenced service in March 1967. The opening of this connection led to an increase of vehicular activity on the island. In response, officials on Sado Island sought assistance from the national government to improve the roads of the island; however, the law governing Japan's national highways only allowed for highways that were connected to core cities, special cities, and prefectural capitals to be designated as national highways. These officials petitioned the then-Secretary-General of the Liberal Democratic Party, Kakuei Tanaka, to give the island a national highway by finding a loophole in the law. The loophole was that if the highway began in Niigata (the prefecture's capital city) and ended in Jōetsu (a special city) it did not matter where the highway was routed between. National Route 350 was established by the Cabinet of Japan in 1975 between the cities of Niigata and Jōetsu via the Sado Island ferry ports at Ryōtsu and Ogi, giving the island its only national highway.

== Major junctions ==
The route lies entirely within Niigata Prefecture.

Location	km	mi	Destinations	Notes
Niigata	0.0	0.0	National Route 7 ends / National Route 8 ends / National Route 17 ends / National Route 113 ends / National Route 116 south / National Route 289 east / National Route 402 south	Northern terminus, highway continues south as National Route 116, northern end of concurrency with National Routes 7, 8, 17, and 113
Niigata	0.9	0.56	National Route 7 north / National Route 8 south / National Route 17 south – Niigata Station	Southern end of concurrency with National Routes 7, 8, and 17
Niigata	1.3	0.81	National Route 113 east – to Nihonkai-Tōhoku Expressway, Niigata Airport	Southern end of concurrency with National Route 113
Sea of Japan	3.0– 67.6	1.9– 42.0	Sado Steam Ship (Niigata–Sado Ferry)	
Sado	67.6	42.0	Niigata Prefecture Route 45 / Niigata Prefecture Route 65 south – Suizu, Mano	Northern end of concurrency with Niigata Prefecture Route 45
Sado	68.4	42.5	Niigata Prefecture Route 45 / 81 north – Futatsugame, Washizaki	Southern end of concurrency with Niigata Prefecture Route 45, northern end of concurrency with Niigata Prefecture Route 81
Sado	71.8	44.6	Niigata Prefecture Route 282 south – Sado Airport	
Sado	72.5	45.0	Niigata Prefecture Route 81 south – Niibo, Tokinomori Park	Southern end of concurrency with Niigata Prefecture Route 81
Sado	78.2	48.6	Niigata Prefecture Route 306 west – Aikawa, Kubota	
Sado	78.7	48.9	Niigata Prefecture Route 181 – Ryōtsu Port, Niibo, Nakaoki	
Sado	79.9	49.6	Niigata Prefecture Route 381 south – Niibo, Hatano	
Sado	81.1	50.4	Niigata Prefecture Route 194 south – Kanamaru	
Sado	84.4	52.4	Niigata Prefecture Route 305 north – Nagaki	
Sado	86.2	53.6	Niigata Prefecture Route 45 north – Aikawa	
Sado	90.6	56.3	Niigata Prefecture Route 194 north – Chigusa, Kanamaru	
Sado	92.7	57.6	Niigata Prefecture Route 65 north – Ryōtsu Port, Hatano	Northern end of Niigata Prefecture Route 65 concurrency
Sado	93.2	57.9	Niigata Prefecture Route 65 south – Akadomari, Mano Goryo	Southern end of Niigata Prefecture Route 65 concurrency
Sado	103.3	64.2	Niigata Prefecture Route 432 east – Shizudaira, Sasagawa	
Sado	107.0	66.5	Niigata Prefecture Route 456 east – Shimokawamo, Osaki	
Sado	108.6	67.5	Niigata Prefecture Route 287 east – Hamochi Port, Hamochihongo	
Sado	113.1	70.3	Niigata Prefecture Route 543 west – Sawasakibana, Kanedashinden	
Sado	115.0	71.5	Niigata Prefecture Route 45 – Akadomari, Hamochi Port, Central Ogi	
Sea of Japan	115.7– 161.2	71.9– 100.2	Sado Steam Ship (Sado–Jōetsu Ferry)	
Jōetsu	161.2	100.2	Niigata Prefecture Route 468 – Kakizaki, Ōgata	
Jōetsu	161.6	100.4	Niigata Prefecture Route 216 – Kubiki, Naoetsu Station	
Jōetsu	162.3	100.8	Niigata Prefecture Route 288 – to National Route 253, Tōkamachi, Uragawara, Naoetsu Station	
Jōetsu	163.2	101.4	National Route 8 – Nagaoka, Kashiwazaki, Toyama, Itoigawa; National Route 18 south – Jōetsumyōkō Station, Nagano, Myōkō	Southern terminus
1.000 mi = 1.609 km; 1.000 km = 0.621 mi: Concurrency terminus; Route transition
