= Rengebuji =

Buddhist temple in Japan

Coordinates: 37.83598°N 138.28807°E

- 蓮華峰寺
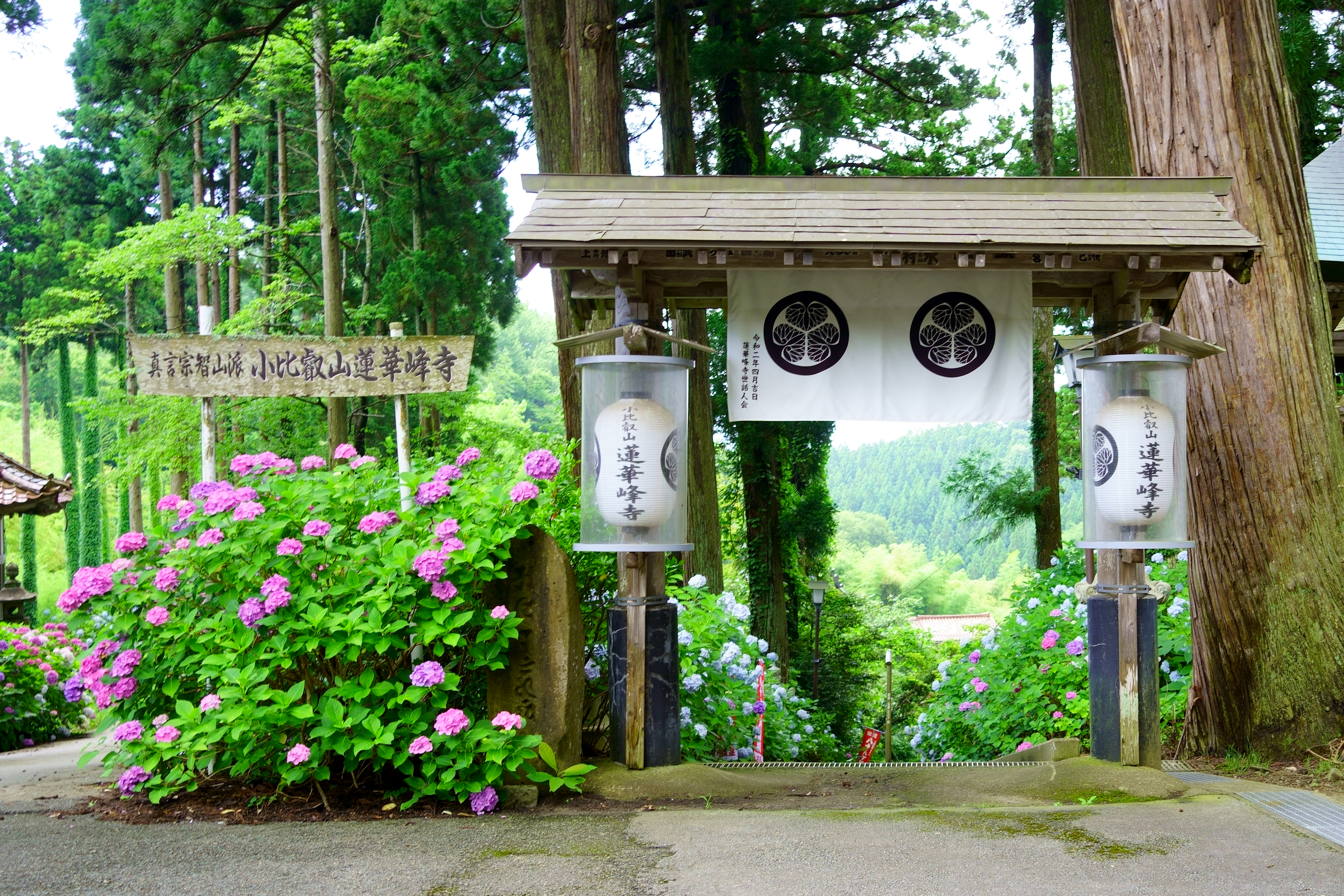

Religion
- Affiliation: Shingon Buddhism
- Sect: Chisan-ha
- Prefecture: Niigata
- Year consecrated: 806 (see text)

Location
- Municipality: Sado
- Country: Japan
- Interactive map of Rengebuji
- Prefecture: Niigata

Architecture
- Founder: Kūkai

Rengebuji (蓮華峰寺) is a Buddhist temple of the Chisan-ha sect of Shingon Buddhism located in the Southern side of Sado island. The temple is said to have been founded by Kūkai in the 9th century.

Its compound houses some well-preserved ancient buildings, several designated important cultural properties at a national level.

Among those are a Kondō (金堂) hall built before 1459, a Kohodō (弘法堂) hall celebrating Kūkai dated 1609, and an ossuary built before 1348, making it the oldest building in Niigata prefecture.
