= Lake Kamo =

Lake in Niigata Prefecture, Japan

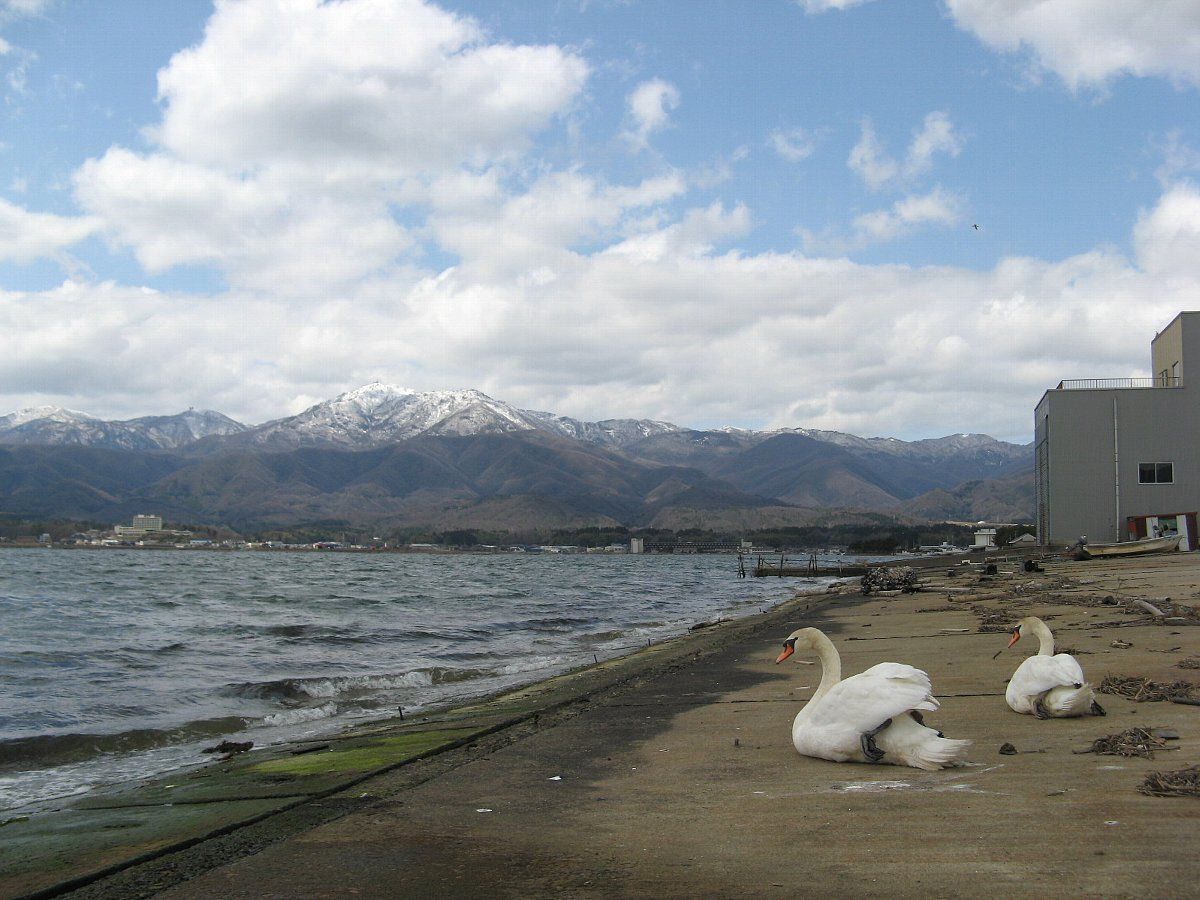
- Lake Kamo and Mount Kimpoku

- Location within Japan
- Coordinates: 38°3′49″N 138°26′12″E
- Catchment area: 4.85 km^{2} (1.87 sq mi)
- Basin countries: Japan
- Max. length: 4.5 km (2.8 mi)
- Max. width: 1.5 km (0.93 mi)
- Surface area: 4.85 km^{2} (1.87 sq mi)
- Max. depth: 8.7 m (29 ft)
- Surface elevation: 0.5 m (1 ft 8 in)

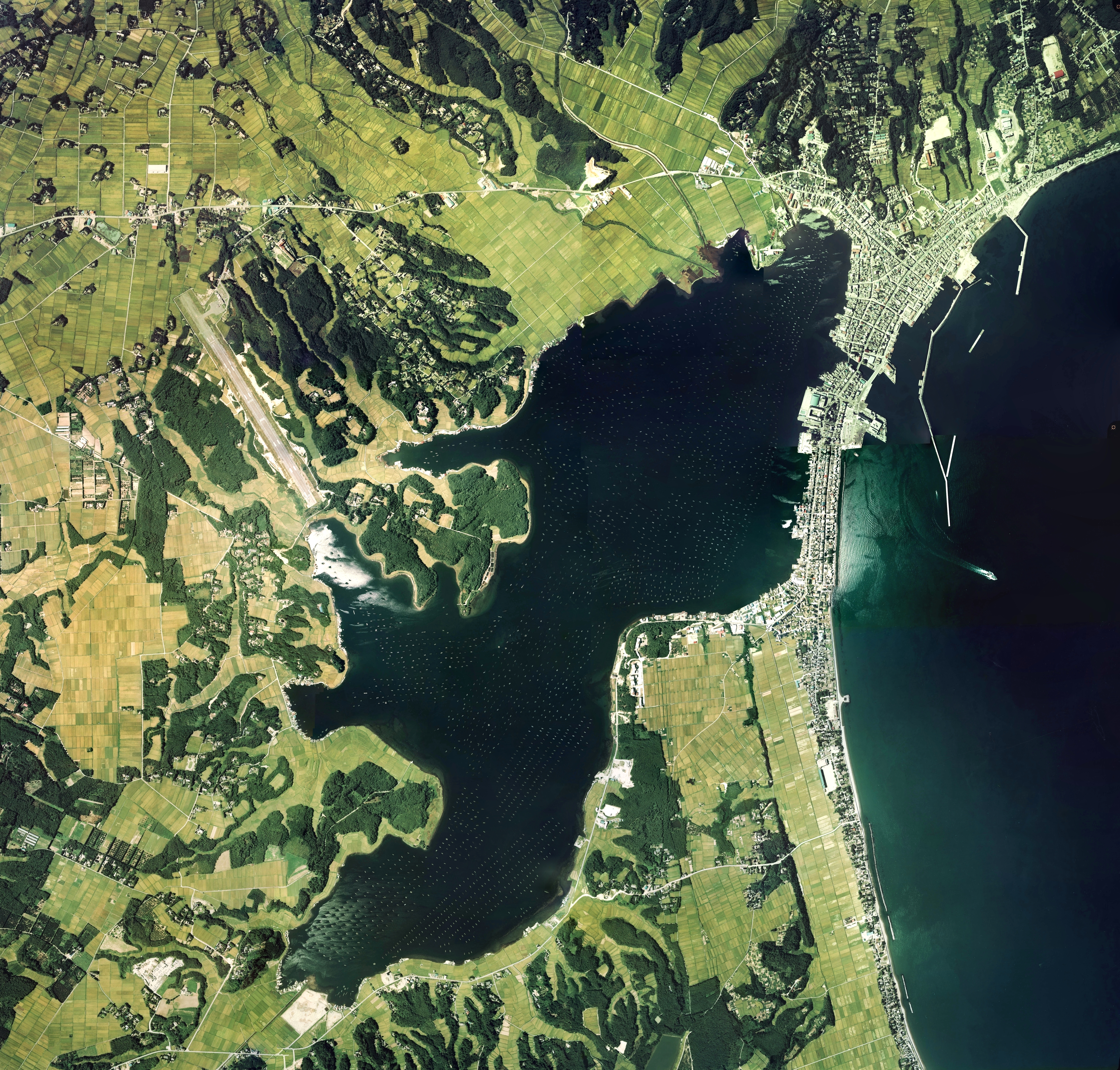
Aerial photograph from 1976

Lake Kamo (Japanese: 加茂湖, Hepburn: Kamo-ko) is a brackish lake on the Sado Island in the Sea of Japan off the west coast of Honshu, Japan. The lake is the largest of Niigata prefecture.

Originally Lake Kamo was a fresh water lake, but was opened to the sea during the Meiji period to avoid floods, and the water became brackish. The lake is famous for oyster farming, since 1932.

Lake Kamo is ranked among the top 100 Landscapes of Japan.
