= Numazu Castle =

Numazu Castle 沼津城
- Numazu, Shizuoka Prefecture, Japan
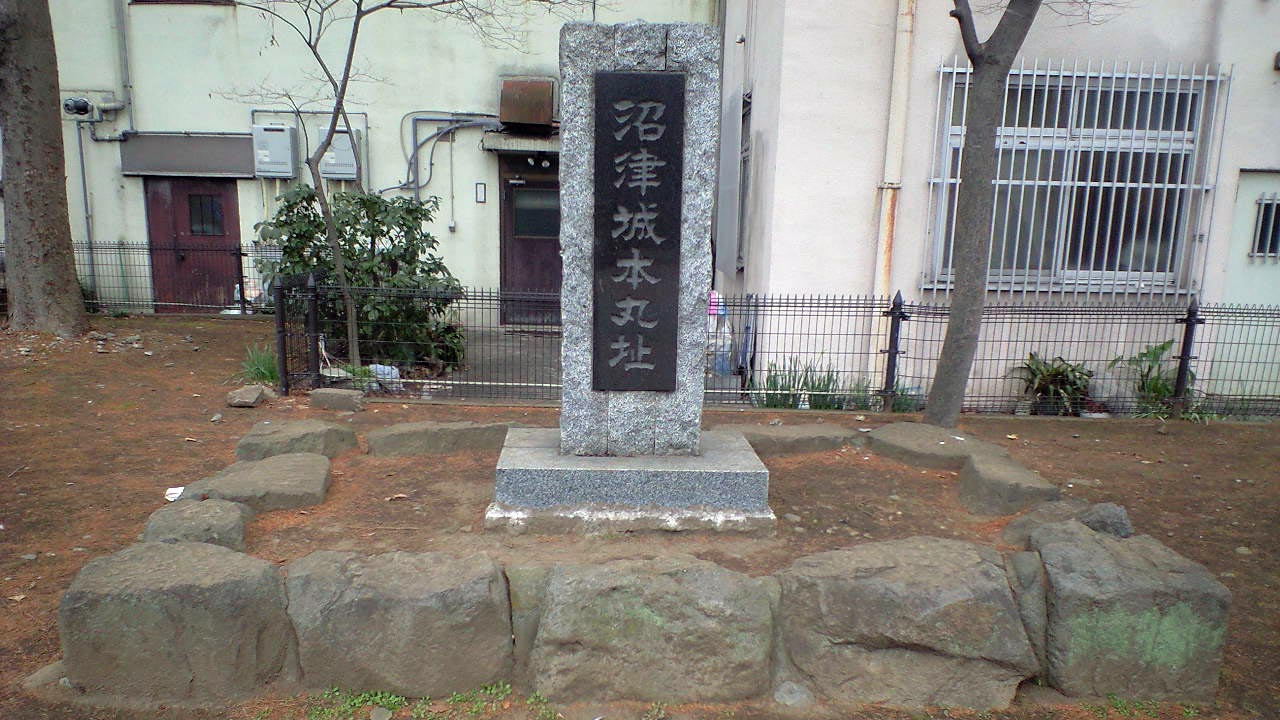
- Monument marking the site of the donjon of Numazu Castle

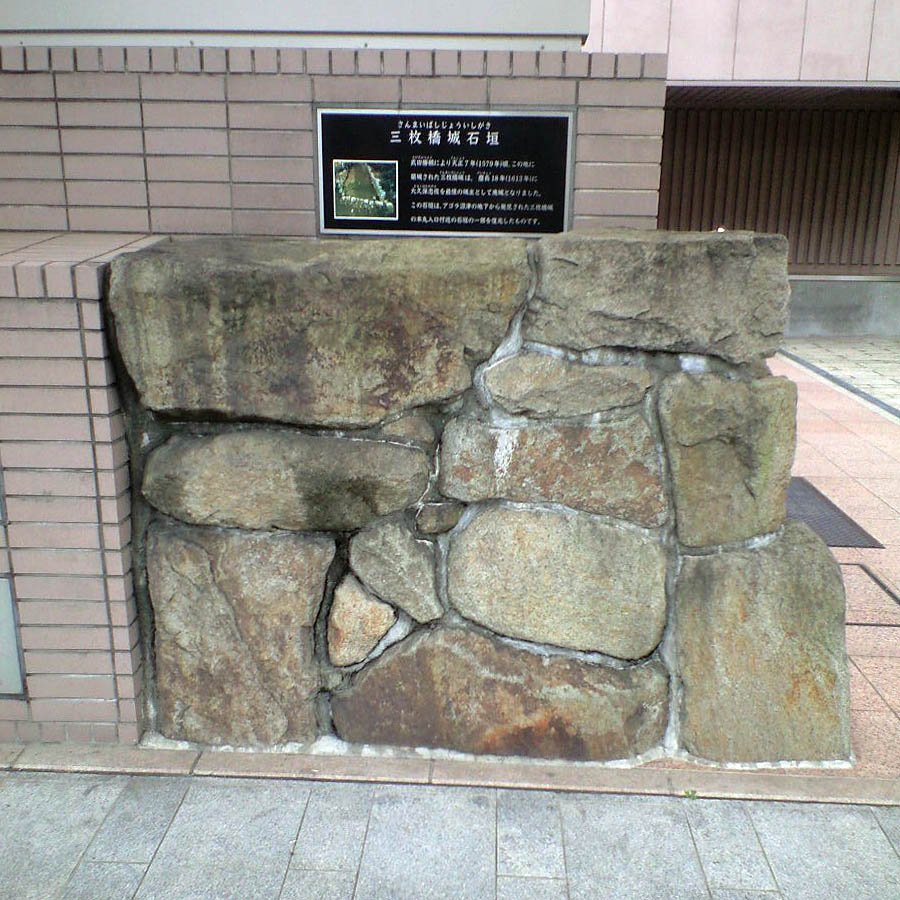
- Fragment of the walls from Numazu Castle

Site information
- Type: Hirayama-style Japanese castle
- Open to the public: no
- Condition: ruins

Location
- Coordinates: 35°05′55.89″N 138°52′02.49″E

Site history
- In use: Edo period
- Demolished: 1869

Numazu Castle (沼津城, Numazu-jō) was a Japanese castle located in the city of Numazu, Shizuoka Prefecture, Japan. It was a hirayama-jō, a castle built on a plains rather than a hill or mountain. During the Edo period, Numazu castle was home to the Mizuno clan, daimyō of Numazu Domain under the Tokugawa shogunate.

== Background ==
Numazu is at the northern end of Izu Peninsula and the mouth of the Kamo River. As a narrow area where the Tōkaidō highway connecting Kyoto with Edo must pass between the Pacific Ocean and the foothills of Mount Fuji, Numazu commanded a strategic location and was also a good port for shipping to the Izu Peninsula. The settlement of Numazu prospered in the Edo period as Numazu-juku, and eight generations of the Mizuno clan resided at Numazu castle, with their revenues eventually rising to 50,000 koku.

== History ==
=== Sanmaibashi Castle ===
The predecessor of Numazu Castle, Sanmaibashi Castle (三枚橋城), was built in the Sengoku period by Takeda Shingen to protect his flank against the Odawara Hōjō during his invasion of Suruga Province. The original castle consisted of three concentric enclosures, each surrounded by a moat connected to the Kano River, with Umadashi-style gates. The Takeda and Hōjō came into conflict in 1578 after the death of Uesugi Kenshin, and Takeda Katsuyori held Sanmaibashi Castle against repeated attacks by the Hōjō from nearby Nagahama Castle.

After the defeat of the Takeda clan in 1582 by the forces of Oda Nobunaga and Tokugawa Ieyasu, the castle went to Tokugawa Ieyasu until 1590, when he was transferred to the Kantō region by Toyotomi Hideyoshi. Numazu was awarded to Nakamura Kazuuji, a retainer of Hideyoshi, who also held Sunpu Castle. Following the Battle of Sekigahara, Tokugawa Ieyasu recovered his ancestral possessions in Suruga, and gave Numazu to his veteran general, Ōkubo Tadasuke in 1601. However, Ōkubo died without heir in 1613, and his domain was abolished, and Sanmaibashi Castle fell into ruin.

=== Numazu Castle ===
In April 1777, when the former wakadoshiyori Mizuno Tadatomo was transferred from Ohama Domain in Mikawa province to Numazu, he was assigned revenues of 20,000 koku and authorized to build a castle. The site he chose was the ruins of Sanmaibashi Castle, which had been abandoned for over 150 years. As this was in the middle of the period of "Great Peace" under the Tokugawa shogunate, the new Numazu Castle used only a portion of the former site, and did not make use of the former third bailey. The defenses were only on a nominal scale, and the Tōkaidō highway passed directly through the space between the castle and the Kano River.

The Mizuno clan retained this castle to the start of the Meiji period, but were transferred when Numazu Domain was abolished with the creation of Shizuoka Domain for the retired ex-Shōgun Tokugawa Yoshinobu in July 1868 by the new Meiji government.

The castle was then used by the Numazu Military Academy, one of the first western-style public schools in Japan and a forerunner of the Imperial Japanese Army Academy from December 1868 to 1871. In 1873, the Meiji government ordered the dismantling of all castles and fortifications in Japan. Numazu castle was destroyed, its moats filled in, and its land sold off. The site of the castle disappeared under modern Numazu city

Today almost no ruins remain at the site, except for a small park with a monument marking the site of the donjon in the inner bailey, and a small fragment of the stone walls lining part of the old moats of former Sanmaibashi Castle.
