= Honda Masamori =

7th daimyō of Tanaka Domain (1827–1885)

Honda Masamori 本多正訥
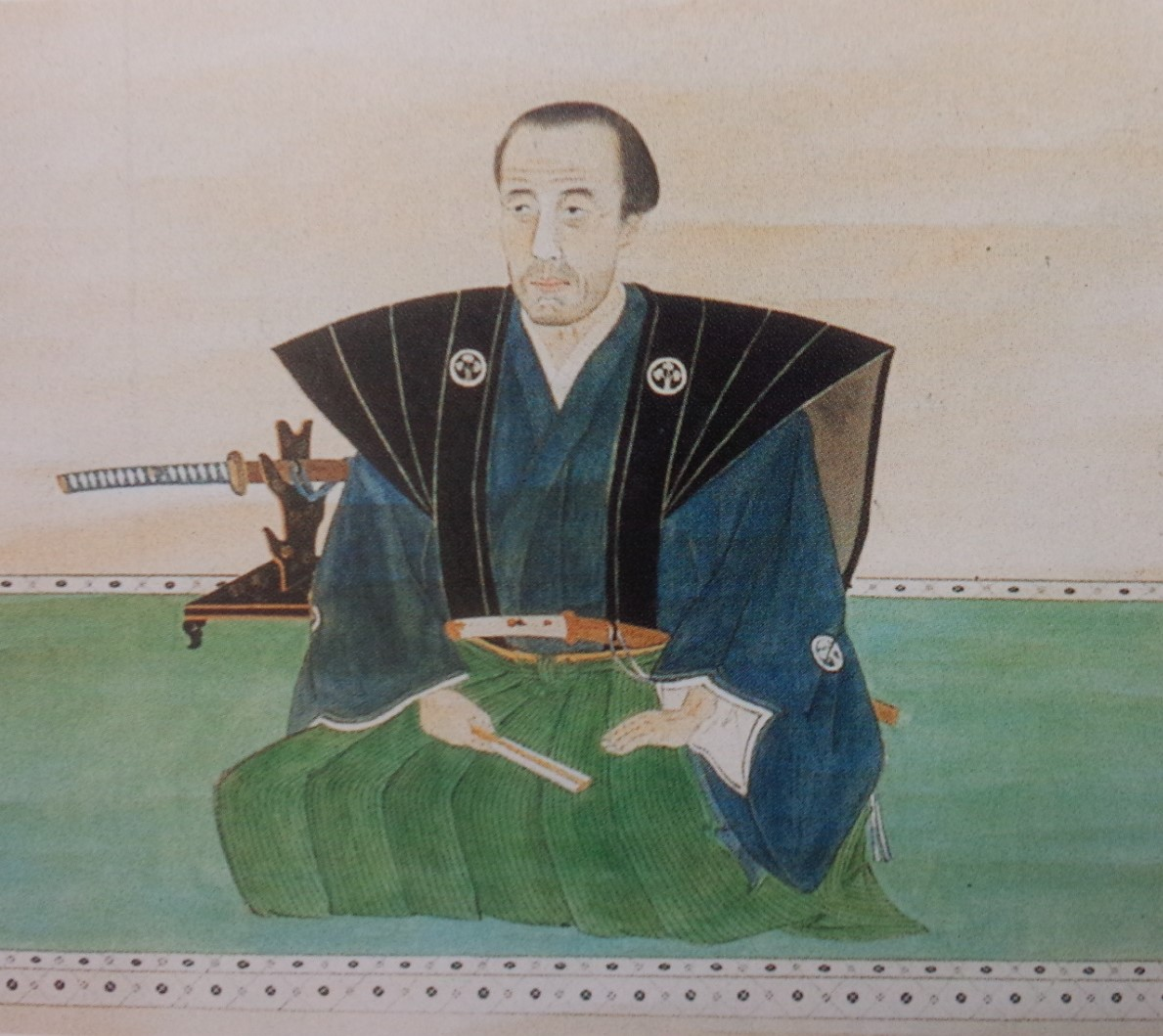
- Honda Masamori
- Born: March 7, 1827
- Died: November 1, 1885 (aged 58); Tokyo, Japan
- Resting place: Aoyama Cemetery, Tokyo
- Other names: Kii-no-kami, Hōki-no-kami
- Occupation: Daimyō

Honda Masamori (本多 正訥; March 7, 1827 – November 1, 1885) was the 7th (and final) daimyō of Tanaka Domain in Suruga Province, Japan (modern-day Shizuoka prefecture) and 9th head of the branch of the Honda clan descended from Honda Tadashige. His courtesy title was Kii-no-kami, later changed to Hōki-no-kami.

== Biography ==
Honda Masamori was born as the 7th son of the 5th daimyō of Tanaka Domain (Honda Masaoki). In 1856, he was adopted by his elder brother Honda Masahiro as heir, and was received in formal audience by Shogun Tokugawa Iesada in 1857, who awarded him the courtesy title of Kii-no-kami and court rank of Junior 5th Rank, Lower Grade. On the death of his brother in 1860, he became daimyō of Tanaka Domain. In 1862, he was appointed to the newly created post of Gakumonjo-bugyō. In 1863, he built a jin'ya at the domain's exclave in Shimōsa Province, and many of his retainers from the domain's shimo-yashiki in Fukagawa, Edo relocated to the new location. In 1864, he was appointed Sunpu jōdai, a post which he held into the Boshin War. Through mediation of Owari Domain, he agreed to surrender Sunpu Castle to the new Meiji government in June 1868.

With the Meiji Restoration of 1868, the final Tokugawa Shōgun, Tokugawa Yoshinobu, surrendered his title to Emperor Meiji, and relocated from Edo to Sumpu, with the provinces of Suruga, Izu and Mikawa as his personal domains. Tanaka Domain was included within the area of the new Shizuoka Domain, and in September 1868, Honda Masamori was ordered to relocate to the newly created Nagao Domain in Awa province, with the same nominal revenue of 40,000 koku. In February 1869, he moved the domainal academy from Tanaka to Nagao. In June of the same year, the title of daimyō was abolished, and he became imperial governor of Nagao.

On December 14, 1870, he turned Nagao Domain over to his adopted son, Honda Masanori, and retired from public life. He died in 1885 at the age of 58, and his grave is at Aoyama Cemetery in Tokyo. He was married to a daughter of Matsudaira Nobuoki of Yoshii Domain, and after her death remarried to a daughter of Inagaki Nagakata of Toba Domain.

Preceded by Tanaka Masahiro	Daimyō of Tanaka; 1860-1868	Succeeded by none
Preceded by none	Daimyō of Nagao; 1868-1870	Succeeded by Honda Masanori
