= Tanaka Castle =

Building in Shizuoka Prefecture, Japan

Coordinates: 34°52′19.22″N 138°16′28.57″E

Tanaka Castle 田中城
- Fujieda, Shizuoka Prefecture, Japan
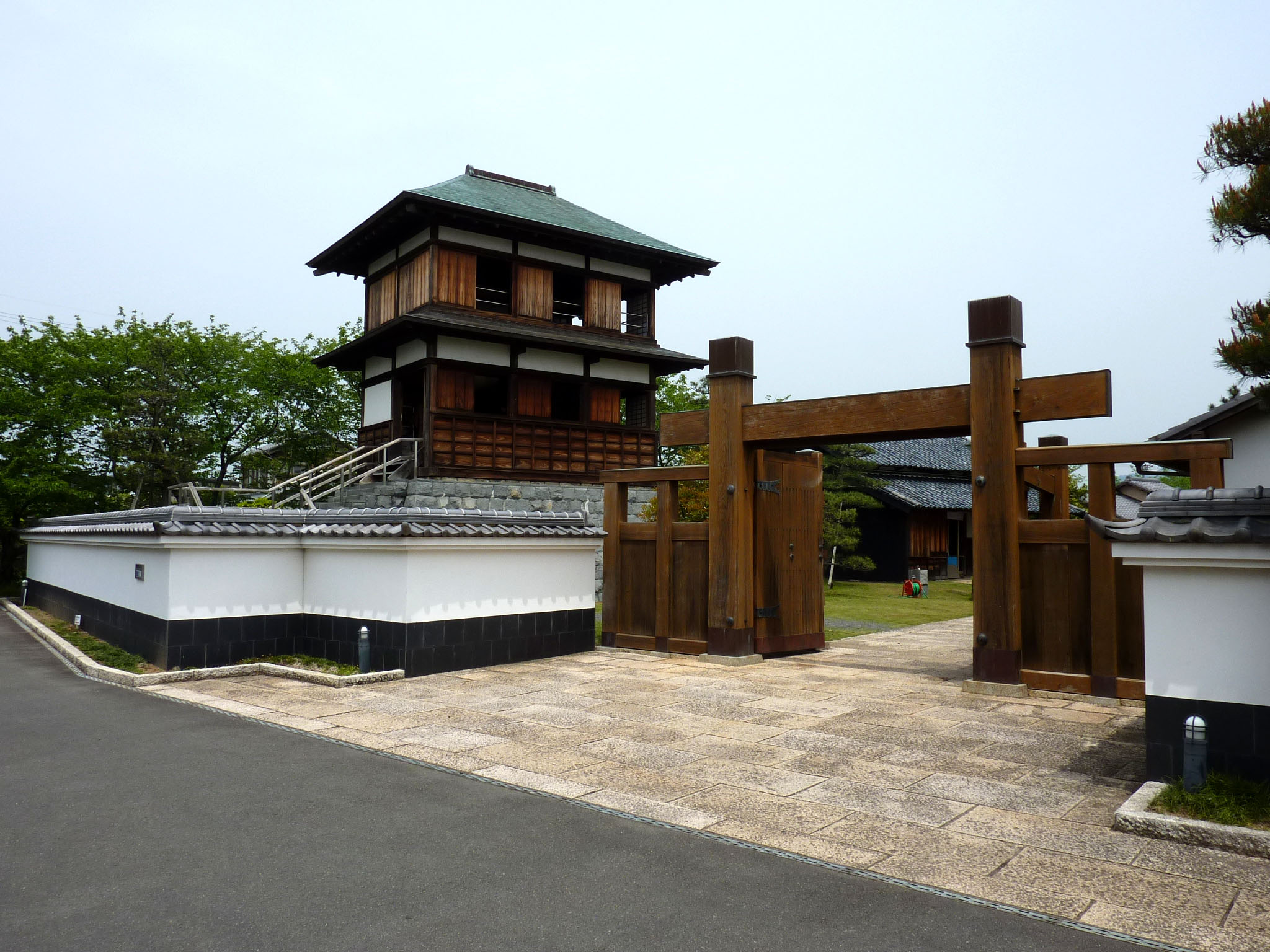
- Relocated Honmaru Yagura of Tanaka Castle

Site information
- Type: flatland-style Japanese castle
- Open to the public: yes
- Condition: partially reconstructed

Location

Site history
- Built: 1537
- Built by: Imagawa clan
- In use: Edo period
- Demolished: 1871

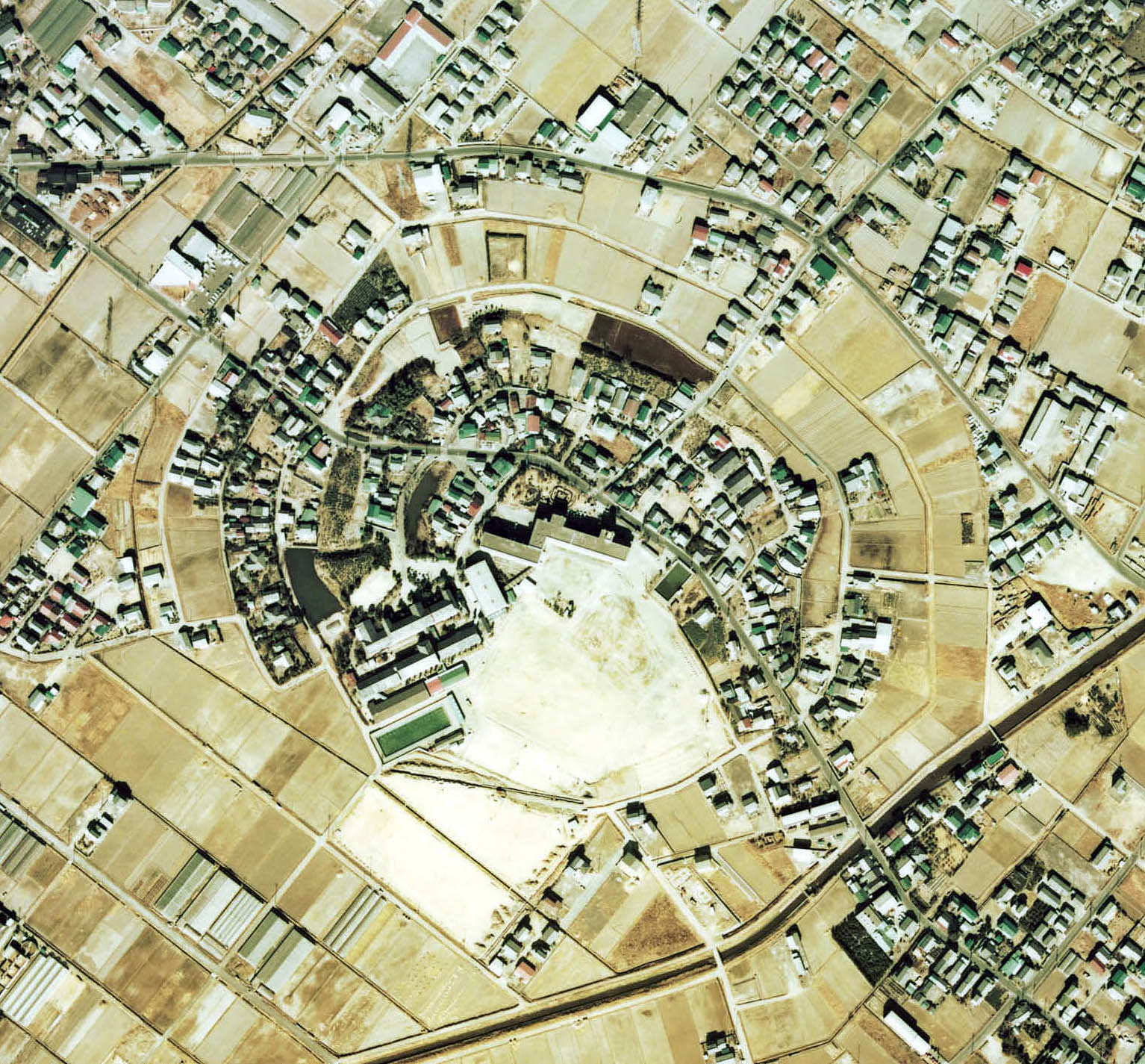
Site of Tanaka Castle showing circular moats

Tanaka Castle (田中城, Tanaka-jō) is a Japanese castle located in Fujieda, central Shizuoka Prefecture, Japan. At the end of the Edo period, Tanaka Castle was home to a branch of the Honda clan, daimyō of Tanaka Domain.

== Background ==
Tanaka Castle is located on a hill in a marshy area in the middle of the Shida Plain, between the Seto and the Rokken rivers. Originally, the Imagawa clan used the site as a small stronghold, ordering their vassals, the Isshiki clan to construct a fortification in 1537 to protect the western approaches to Sunpu Castle.

However, when Suruga Province came under occupation by the Takeda clan in 1570, Takeda Shingen had the stronghold expanded to guard the western border of Suruga against the increasing strength of Tokugawa Ieyasu in neighboring Tōtōmi Province, and assigned his general Yamagata Masakage as castellan. In 1572, another of Shingen's generals, Inagaki Nobuyasu, replaced Yamagata. The castle withstood an attack by Tokugawa forces in 1582, but was later surrendered after the death of Takeda Katsuyori.

The current layout of Tanaka Castle dates from the period of Takeda rule. As there was no limitation due to geography, the fortifications consisted of three concentric circular moats, each with four gates equipped with a "maru umadashi" style gate, itself surrounded by crescent-moon shaped moats. The outer moat had a diameter of 300 meters.

== History ==
The location of the castle on the Tōkaidō highway connecting Edo with Kyoto gave it considerable strategic value.

Following the establishment of the Tokugawa shogunate, Tokugawa Ieyasu assigned the castle to Sakai Tadatoshi, who built a small, 2-story donjon and added a fourth moat. Subsequently, as headquarters for Tanaka Domain, it changed hands many times during the early Edo period through a succession of fudai daimyō before coming under the control of a cadet branch of the Honda clan in 1730.

Tokugawa Ieyasu and subsequent shōgun used the castle as an occasional base for falconry expeditions, and it was at Tanaka Castle that Tokugawa Ieyasu is alleged to have eaten tempura, just before his death.

During the Bakumatsu period, in 1868 the Honda were reassigned to the newly created Nagao Domain in Awa Province in order to make way for an expanded Shizuoka Domain to be ruled by the ex-Shōgun Tokugawa Yoshinobu. Tanaka Castle was assigned to one of his hatamoto, the sōjutsu master Takahashi Deishū, but was pulled down in 1872, following the Meiji Restoration. Most of the castle area turned to schools, houses and rice fields. The current structures include remnants of the moats and stonework, as well as a large yagura, reconstructed in 1992 to serve as a local history museum.

== Literature ==
- De Lange, William (2021). An Encyclopedia of Japanese Castles. Groningen: Toyo Press. pp. 600 pages. ISBN 978-9492722300.
- Schmorleitz, Morton S. (1974). Castles in Japan. Tokyo: Charles E. Tuttle Co. pp. 144–145. ISBN 0-8048-1102-4.
- Motoo, Hinago (1986). Japanese Castles. Tokyo: Kodansha. p. 200 pages. ISBN 0-87011-766-1.
- Mitchelhill, Jennifer (2004). Castles of the Samurai: Power and Beauty. Tokyo: Kodansha. p. 112 pages. ISBN 4-7700-2954-3.
- Turnbull, Stephen (2003). Japanese Castles 1540-1640. Osprey Publishing. p. 64 pages. ISBN 1-84176-429-9.
