= Nagao Domain =

Nagao Domain (長尾藩, Nagao-han) was a Japanese feudal domain of the early Meiji period, located in Awa Province. It was centered at what is now the Shirahama area of the city of Minamibōsō, Chiba in Chiba Prefecture.

== History ==
In 1867, during the Meiji Restoration, the final shōgun, Tokugawa Yoshinobu resigned his office to Emperor Meiji and leadership of the Tokugawa clan to Tokugawa Iesato. In 1868, Iesato was demoted in status to that of an ordinary daimyō, and assigned the newly created Shizuoka Domain, which included all of former Sunpu Domain, neighboring Tanaka and Ojima Domains, and additional lands in Tōtōmi and Mutsu Provinces for a total revenue of 700,000 koku. The new domain covered the western two-thirds of Shizuoka Prefecture, plus the Chita Peninsula in Aichi Prefecture.

In the process, the existing daimyō in Suruga and Tōtōmi Provinces were displaced. This included the sixth (and final) daimyō of Tanaka Domain, Honda Masamori. As Honda Masamori had proved his loyalty to the new Meiji government by contributed his forces to the imperial armies during the Boshin War despite his status as a fudai daimyō, he was allowed to keep his revenues of 40,000 koku, but was transferred to the newly created Nagao Domain in Awa Province.

However, in 1869, the title of daimyō was abolished, and with the abolition of the han system, Honda Masamori retired from public life in December 1870, turning the new position of Domain Governor over to his son. In March 1871, Nagao Domain itself was abolished, becoming Nagao Prefecture, which in turn merged with neighboring Kisarazu Prefecture in November of that year to become part of modern Chiba Prefecture.

== List of daimyōs ==
- Honda clan (fudai) 1730–1868

#	Name	Tenure	Courtesy title	Court Rank	revenues
1	Honda Masamori (本多正訥)	1868–1870	Kii-no-kami	Lower 5th (従五位下)	40,000 koku
2	Honda Masanori (本多正憲)	1870–1871	Viscount	Lower 5th (従五位下)	40,000 koku
