= Sunpu =

Sunpu or Sumpu may refer to:

- The former name of Shizuoka, Shizuoka, Japan
- Sunpu Domain, a Japanese feudal domain during the Edo period centered in Suruga Province
- Sunpu Castle, a former castle in Shizuoka City, Shizuoka Prefecture, Japan
- Sunpu jōdai, officials of the Tokugawa shogunate during the Edo period Japan
