= Numazu Domain =

Numazu Domain 沼津藩
- under Tokugawa shogunate Japan
- 1601–1871
- Capital: Numazu Castle
- Area
  - Coordinates: 35°05′55.89″N 138°52′02.49″E
  - Type: Daimyō
- Historical era: Edo period
  - Established: 1601
  - Disestablished: 1871
- Today part of: part of Shizuoka Prefecture

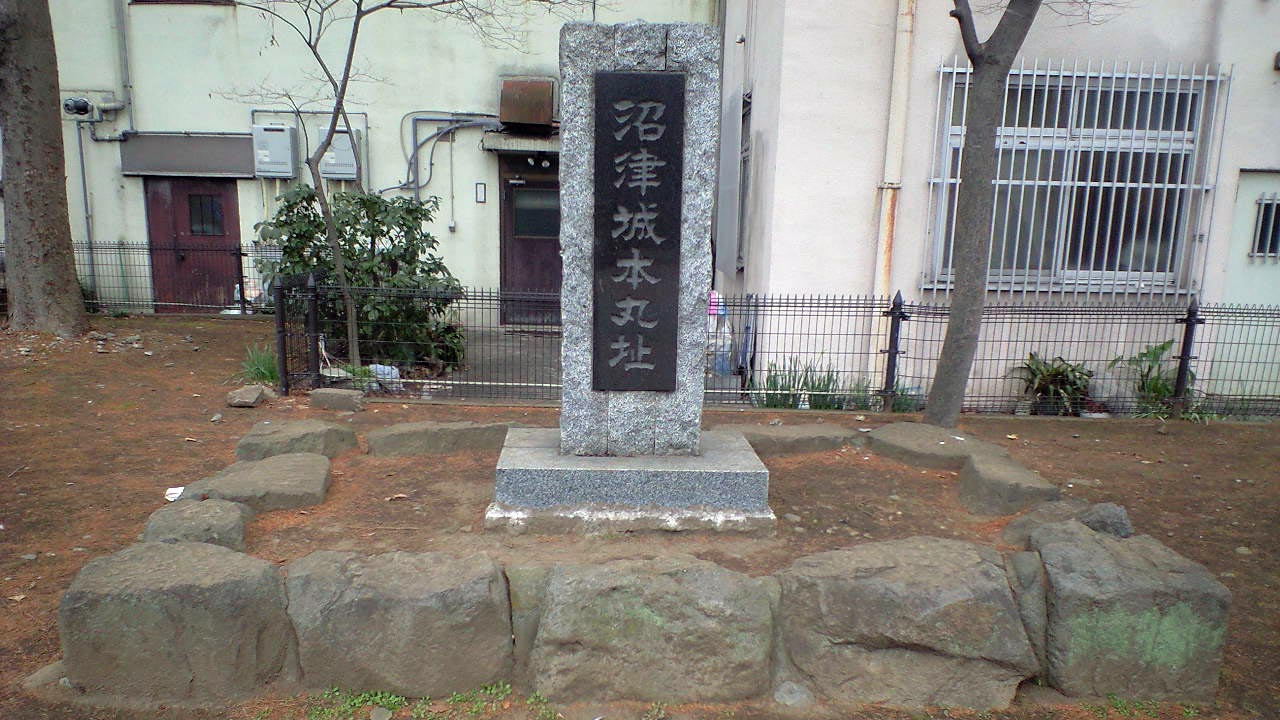
Monument marking site of the keep of Numazu Castle

Numazu Domain (沼津藩, Numazu-han) was a feudal domain under the Tokugawa shogunate of Edo period Japan located in Suruga Province. It was centered on Numazu Castle in what is now the city of Numazu, in modern-day Shizuoka Prefecture.

== History ==
In 1601, Ōkubo Tadasuke, a 5000 koku hatamoto was rewarded by Shōgun Tokugawa Ieyasu for his efforts at the Battle of Sekigahara, where he stopped an advance by Toyotomi forces under the famed Sanada Yukimura, by elevation to the rank of daimyō. He was assigned the territory of Numazu, to the east of Sunpu, to be his domain, with revenues of 40,000 koku. However, when he died without heirs in 1617, the domain reverted to the Tokugawa Shogunate.

The domain was revived in April 1777, when the former wakadoshiyori Mizuno Tadatomo was transferred from Ohama Domain in Mikawa province, and assigned revenues of 20,000 koku. He rebuilt Numazu Castle in 1780, and his revenues were increased by 5,000 koku in 1781 when he assumed the post of rōjū . He received another 5,000 koku increase in 1785.

The second daimyō of Numazu, Mizuno Tadaakira, was also a rōjū, and a close confidant of Tanuma Okitsugu, a senior official in the Tokugawa shogunate. Through this connection, he secured an increase in the revenues of Numazu Domain by an additional 10,000 koku in 1821 and another 10,000 koku in 1829.

The 6th daimyō, Mizuno Tadahiro, was a close confidant of Senior Councilor Ii Naosuke.

However, during the Bakumatsu period, the 8th (and final) daimyō, Mizuno Tadanori, sided with the new Meiji government in the Boshin War of the Meiji Restoration. His domain was abolished with the creation of Shizuoka Domain for the retired ex-Shōgun Tokugawa Yoshinobu. The holdings of the domain in Suruga province were transferred to Shizuoka Domain, and the holdings in Izu province with transferred to Nirayama Prefecture. Tadanori was assigned the short-lived Kikuma Domain in Kazusa province in July 1868 with the same nominal kokudaka.

In 1871, the territory of former Numazu Domain became part of Shizuoka Prefecture.

== Holdings at the end of the Edo period ==
As with most domains in the han system, Numazu Domain consisted of several discontinuous territories calculated to provide the assigned kokudaka, based on periodic cadastral surveys and projected agricultural yields.

- Suruga Province
  - 37 villages in Suntō District
  - 7 villages in Fuji District
  - 7 villages in Shida District
  - 3 villages in Mashizu District
- Izu Province
  - 11 villages in Kimisawa District
  - 7 villages in Tagata District
  - 14 villages in Kamo District

== List of daimyō ==
#	Name	Tenure	Courtesy title	Court Rank	kokudaka
Ōkubo clan, 1601-1613 (fudai)
1	Ōkubo Tadasuke (大久保 忠佐)	1601–1613			20,000 koku
Tokugawa clan, 1613-1777 (tenryō)
Mizuno clan, 1777-1868 (fudai)
1	Mizuno Tadatomo (水野忠友)	1777–1802	Dewa-no-kami (出羽守); Jijū (侍従)	Junior 4th Rank, Lower Grade (従四位下)	20,000→30,000 koku
2	Mizuno Tadaakira (水野忠成)	1802–1834	Dewa-no-kami (出羽守); Jijū (侍従)	Junior 4th Rank, Lower Grade (従四位下)	30,000→50,000 koku
3	Mizuno Tadayoshi (水野忠義)	1834–1842	Dewa-no-kami (出羽守)	Junior 4th Rank, Lower Grade (従四位下)	50,000 koku
4	Mizuno Tadatake (水野忠武)	1842–1844	Dewa-no-kami (出羽守)	Junior 5th Rank, Lower Grade (従五位下)	50,000 koku
5	Mizuno Tadayoshi (水野忠良)	1844–1858	Dewa-no-kami (出羽守)	Junior 5th Rank, Lower Grade (従五位下)	50,000 koku
6	Mizuno Tadahiro (水野忠寛)	1858–1862	Dewa-no-kami (出羽守)	Junior 4th Rank, Lower Grade (従四位下)	50,000 koku
7	Mizuno Tadanobu (水野忠誠)	1862–1866	Dewa-no-kami (出羽守)	Junior 4th Rank, Lower Grade (従四位下)	50,000 koku
8	Mizuno Tadanori (水野忠敬)	1866–1868	Dewa-no-kami (出羽守)	3rd (従三位)	50,000 koku

== See also ==
- List of Han
- Abolition of the han system
