= Ojima Domain =

Japanese domain in the Edo period

Ojima Domain 小島藩
- under Tokugawa shogunate Japan
- 1689–1868
- Capital: Ojima jin'ya
- Area
  - Coordinates: 35°05′06″N 138°30′57″E
  - Type: Daimyō
- Historical era: Edo period
  - Established: 1689
  - Disestablished: 1868
- Today part of: part of Shizuoka Prefecture

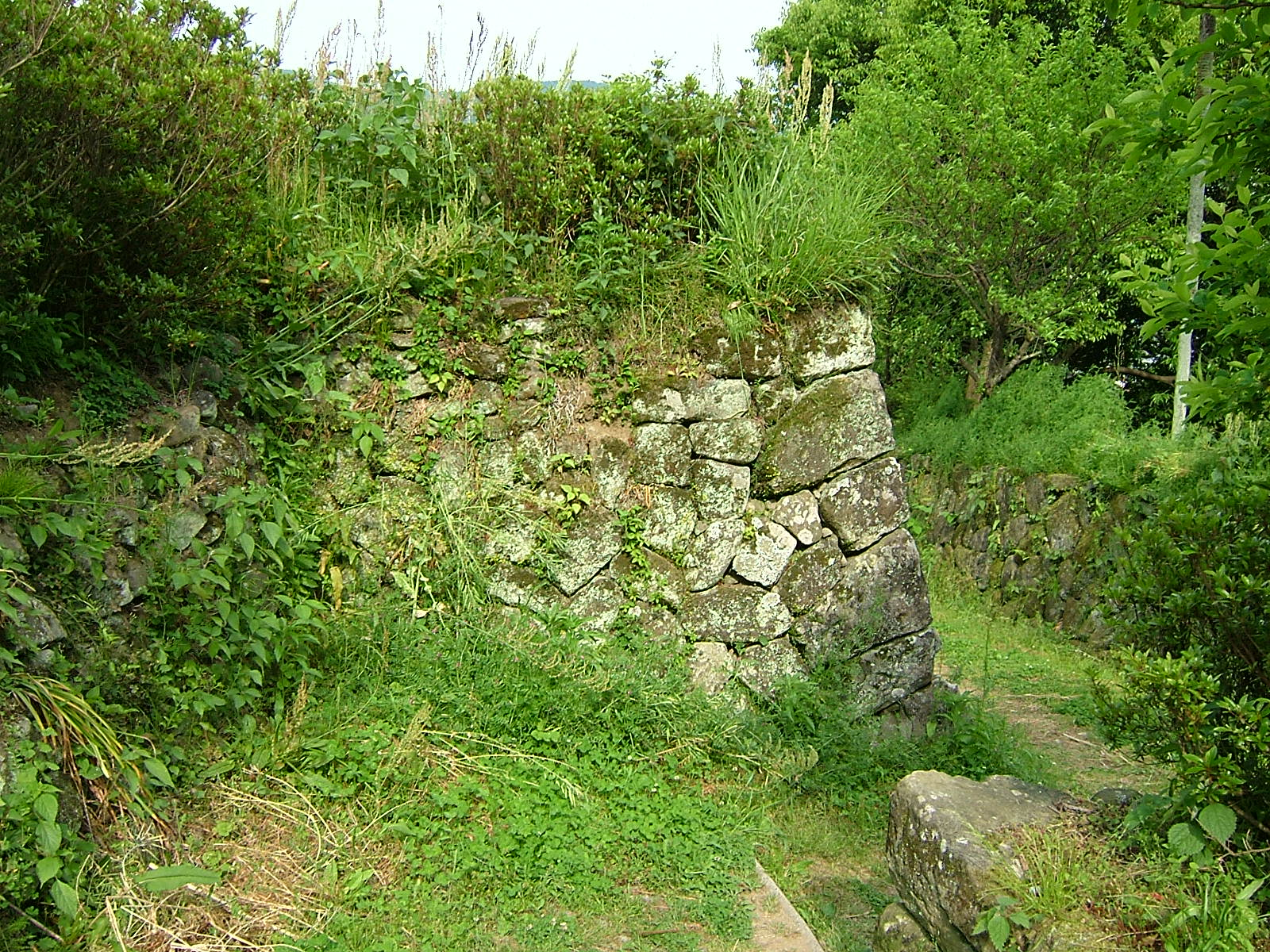
ruins of Ojima Jin’ya

Ojima Domain (小島藩, Ojima-han), also known as Kojima Domain, was a Japanese domain of the Edo period. It was located in Suruga Province in what is now part of modern-day Shimizu Ward of the city of Shizuoka, Shizuoka Prefecture.

== History ==
In May 1689, Matsudaira Nobunari, the adopted son of the castellan of Sunpu Castle, and a wakadoshiyori in the Tokugawa Shogunate was elevated from his former hatamoto status of 4000 koku, to daimyō status of 10,000 koku, and assigned the territory of Ojima, to the east of Sunpu, to be his domain. He was also authorized to start his own branch of the Matsudaira clan, the Takiwaki Matsudaira clan (滝脇松平家).

During the period of the 4th daimyō, Matsudaira Masanobu, the domain faced bankruptcy, which he attempted to resolve with such a large increase in taxes that its peasants rose in a revolt in 1768. Fiscal problems continued over the years, with the 8th daimyō, Matsudaira Nobumoto publishing a tract attempting the explain to both his retainers and his peasants on the need for high taxes and fiscal restraint. The 9th daimyō, Matsudaira Nobuyuki, made all industry within the domain a government monopoly, and sold off permits to raise money.

During the Bakumatsu period, the 11th (and final) daimyō, Matsudaira Nobutoshi, sided with the new Meiji government in the Boshin War of 1867. The domain was abolished with the creation of Shizuoka Domain for the retired ex-Shōgun Tokugawa Yoshinobu, and Nobutoshi was transferred to the newly formed Sakurai Domain in Kazusa province in July 1869.

== Ojima jin'ya ==
The site of the Ojima jin'ya is located on a river terrace on the right bank of the Okitsu River at an elevation of 60 meters, overlooking the road to Mount Minobu and Kai Province. Altogether Ojma Domain was only 20,000 koku and was thus not permitted a castle, the stone ramparts were constructed in the same manner as a small Japanese castle and reach the height of four meters in places. After the Meiji restoration, the jin'ya building was used as an elementary school before it was demolished in 1928. The site was later used for a public hall by Ojima village. The site was designated a National Historic Site of Japan in 1979.

== Holdings at the end of the Edo period ==
As with most domains in the han system, Ojima Domain consisted of several discontinuous territories calculated to provide the assigned kokudaka, based on periodic cadastral surveys and projected agricultural yields. All of the domain's territory was within Suruga Province.

- 13 villages in Ihara District
- 12 villages in Abe District
- 6 villages in Udo District

== List of daimyō ==
- Matsudaira (Takiwaki) clan, 1704-1868 (fudai; 10,000 koku)

#	Name	Tenure	Courtesy title	Court Rank
1	Matsudaira Nobunari (松平信孝)	1689–1690	Tajima-no-kami (但馬守)	Junior 5th Rank, Lower Grade (従五位下)
2	Matsudaira Nobuharu (松平信孝)	1690–1724	Shimotsuke-no-kami (下野守)	Junior 5th Rank, Lower Grade (従五位下)
3	Matsudaira Nobutaka (松平信嵩)	1724–1731	Awa-no-kami (安房守)	Junior 5th Rank, Lower Grade (従五位下)
4	Matsudaira Masanobu (松平昌信)	1731–1771	Awa-no-kami (安房守)	Junior 5th Rank, Lower Grade (従五位下)
5	Matsudaira Nobunori (松平信義)	1771–1800	Tamba-no-kami (丹波守)	Junior 5th Rank, Lower Grade (従五位下)
6	Matsudaira Nobukado (松平信圭)	1800–1815	Awa-no-kami (安房守)	Junior 5th Rank, Lower Grade (従五位下)
7	Matsudaira Nobutomo (松平信友)	1815–1836	Tango-no-kami (丹後守)	Junior 5th Rank, Lower Grade (従五位下)
8	Matsudaira Nobumasu (松平信賢)	1836–1851	Tango-no-kami (丹後守)	Junior 5th Rank, Lower Grade (従五位下)
9	Matsudaira Nobuyuki (松平信進)	1851–1863	Tango-no-kami (丹後守)	Junior 5th Rank, Lower Grade (従五位下)
10	Matsudaira Nobufumi (松平信書)	1863–1864	Tango-no-kami (丹後守)	Junior 5th Rank, Lower Grade (従五位下)
11	Matsudaira Nobutoshi (Takiwaki) (松平信敏)	1864–1868	Tango-no-kami (丹後守)	Junior 5th Rank, Lower Grade (従五位下)

=== Matsudaira Nobunari ===
Matsudaira Nobunari (松平信孝; 1655-September 17, 1690) was the 1st daimyō of Ojima Domain. He was a younger son of Matsudaira Tsukenobu of Sasayama Domain and was adopted by his great-uncle, Matsudaira Shigenobu, who was the 6000 koku Sunpu jōdai in 1671. He rose through various minor positions within the shogun administration and by 1689 had amassed 10,000 koku, which qualified him for the rank of daimyō. However, he died in 1690 at the age of 36. His wife was a daughter of Matudaira Norimasa of Komoro Domain. His grave is at the temple of Eishin-ji in Shitaya, Taito, Tokyo.

=== Matsudaira Nobuharu ===
Matsudaira Nobuharu (松平信治; 1673-April 22, 1724) was the 2nd daimyō of Ojima Domain. He was the son of Toda Shigetsuna, a 6400 koku hatamoto and his mother was the younger sister of Matsudaira Nobunari. He was posthumously adopted on Nobunari's death, becoming daimyō in 1690. He moved the jin'ya to its present location in Ojima, so technically, he is actually the 1st daimyō of Ojima Domain. He served in the shogunate administration as a page, and later as Obangashira. His wife was a daughter of Tamura Tatsuaki of Ichinoseki Domain; however, both of his sons died in childhood. His grave is at the temple of Eishin-ji in Shitaya, Taito, Tokyo.

=== Matsudaira Nobutaka ===
Matsudaira Nobutaka (松平信嵩; 1710-April 22, 1724) was the 3rd daimyō of Ojima Domain. He was the sixth son of Matsudaira Nabutsune of Sasayama Domain, the brother sister of Matsudaira Nobunari. He was adopted by Matsudaira Nobuharu in 1721 and became daimyō on Nobuharu's death in 1724. During his brief tenure he attempted to improve on the domain's financial situation by aggressively collecting taxes, but to no avail. He died in 1731 at the age of 22. His grave is at the temple of Eishin-ji in Shitaya, Taito, Tokyo.

=== Matsudaira Shigenobu ===
Matsudaira Shigenobu (松平昌信; 1728-August 7, 1771), also known as Matsudaira Masanobu, was the 4th daimyō of Ojima Domain. He was born in Ojima the eldest son of Matsudaira Nobutaka. He became daimyō in 1731. During his tenure he attempted to improve on the domain's financial situation by aggressively collecting taxes, opening new rice lands, increasing corvee labor, to the extent that when he was away as Osaka kaban in 1764, the peasants of the domain rose in revolt. He was forced to curtail the reform program in 1765. His wife was a daughter of Matsudaira Tadataka of Anegasaki Domain. His grave is at the temple of Ryoshin-ji in Shimizu-ku, Shizuoka.

=== Matsudaira Nobunori ===
Matsudaira Nobunori (松平信義; 1742-October 24, 1801), also known as Matsudaira Masanobu, was the 6th daimyō of Ojima Domain. He was the eldest son of Hori Naotaka of Muramatsu Domain and was adopted as heir by marriage to Matsudaira Shigenobu's daughter. He became daimyō in 1771 on Shigenobu's death. During his tenure, a popular Kibyōshi was published in Edo by Koikawa Harumachi which was highly satirical of the shogunal administration. This came to the attention of the authorities, who discovered that "Koikawa Tarumachi" was a pen-name for Kurahashi Itaru, one of Nobunori's senior retainers. Nobunari was forced to retire in 1800 and died a year later. His grave is at the temple of Eishin-ji in Shitaya, Taito, Tokyo.

=== Matsudaira Nobukado ===
Matsudaira Nobukado (松平信圭; 1776-April 2, 1820) was the 6th daimyō of Ojima Domain. He was the eldest son of Matsudaira Nobunori and became daimyō in 1780 on his father's forced retirement. He was a noted author. He retired in 1815. His wife was a daughter of Ooka Tadayoshi of Iwatsuki Domain. He died in 1820 at the age of 45. His grave is at the temple of Eishin-ji in Shitaya, Taito, Tokyo.

=== Matsudaira Nobutomo ===
Matsudaira Nobutomo (松平信友; 1797-April 9, 1848) was the 7th daimyō of Ojima Domain. He was the eldest son of Matsudaira Nobukado and became daimyō in 1815 on his father's retirement. He published tomes asking for cooperation between the samurai and peasants for fiscal reforms of the domain. Citing ill heath, he retired in 1836. His wife was a daughter of Aoyama Yukitaka of Gujō Domain. he died in 1848 and the age of 52. His grave is at the temple of Eishin-ji in Shitaya, Taito, Tokyo.

=== Matsudaira Nobumasu ===
Matsudaira Nobumasa (松平信賢; July 10, 1808-September 11, 1873) was the 8th daimyō of Ojima Domain. He was the sixth son of Matsudaira Nobuyuki of Kameyama Domain and was adopted as heir via marriage to a daughter of Matsudaira Nobutomo. He became daimyō in 1836 on Matsudaira Nobutomo's retirement. During his tenure, the domain had to cope with the effects of the Tenpō famine. He retired in 1851 and died in 1873 at the age of 66. His grave is at the temple of Eishin-ji in Shitaya, Taito, Tokyo.

=== Matsudaira Nobuyuki ===
Matsudaira Nobuyuki (松平信進; September 8, 1813-March 13, 1863) was the 9th daimyō of Ojima Domain. He was the second son of Matsudaira Naritsune of Matsue Domain and was married to a daughter Matsudaira Nobuyuki of Kameyama Domain. When Matsudaira Nobumasu retired in 1851, he was adopted as heir and became daimyō of Ojima. During his tenure, over concerns of foreign invasion raised by the Perry Expedition, he did what he could increase the domain's meagre military capability. He died in 1863 at the age of 51. His grave is at the temple of Eishin-ji in Shitaya, Taito, Tokyo.

=== Matsudaira Nobufumi ===
Matsudaira Nobuyuki (松平信書; July 30, 1846-July 30, 1864) was the 10th daimyō of Ojima Domain. He was the third son of Matsudaira Nobutomo and became daimyō in 1863 on the sudden death of Matsudaira Nobuyuki. However, he died only a year later at the age of 19. His grave is at the temple of Eishin-ji in Shitaya, Taito, Tokyo.

=== Takiwaki Nobutoshi ===
Takiwaki Nobutoshi (滝脇信敏; September 18, 1851-August 10, 1887) was the 11th (and final) daimyō of Ojima Domain. He was the ninth son of Naitō Yoriyasu of Takatō Domain and was adopted posthumously as heir to Matsudaira Nobufumi in 1864. The domain played no part the Boshin War. After the Meiji restoration, Tokugawa Yoshinobu was granted Suruga Domain, and Nobutoshi was ordered to transfer to the newly created Sakurai Domain in Kazusa Province with the same kokudaka in 1868. He changed his surname from "Matsudaira" to "Takiwaki" to distance himself from the former regime. The new jin'ya was completed in 1869, and he resided in Kazusa as Imperial Governor of Sakurai until the abolition of the han system in 1871. In 1879 he was sent as a government official to Okinawa Prefecture. In 1884 he was elevated to viscount (shishaku) in the new kazoku peerage system. He died in 1887 at the age of 37. His grave is at the temple of Eishin-ji in Shitaya, Taito, Tokyo.

== See also ==
- List of Han
- List of Historic Sites of Japan (Shizuoka)
