= Mizuno Tadanori =

Daimyō of Numazu Domain

Mizuno Tadanori 水野忠敬
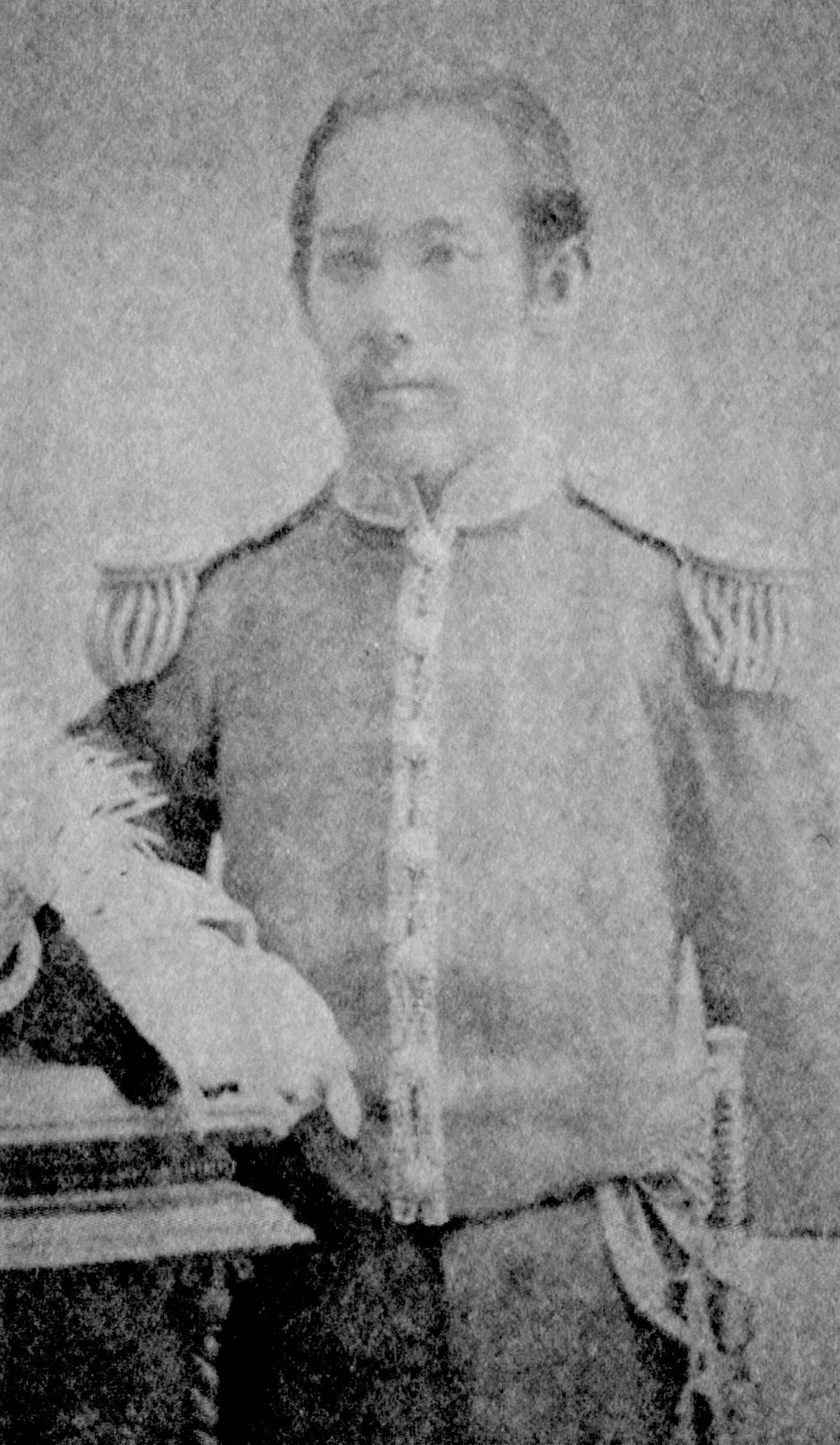
- Born: August 6, 1851
- Died: August 18, 1907 (aged 56)
- Occupation: Daimyō of Numazu Domain (1866-1868)
- Father: Mizuno Tadaakira

Mizuno Tadanori (水野忠敬; August 6, 1851 – August 18, 1907) was the 8th and final daimyō of Numazu Domain in Suruga Province, Honshū, Japan (modern-day Shizuoka Prefecture), and 15th hereditary head of the Numazu-Mizuno clan.

== Biography ==
Mizuno Tadanori was born as the younger son of a hatamoto of Numazu Domain and was posthumously adopted as heir to Mizuno Tadanobu on the latter's sudden death in 1866.

In 1867, he received the courtesy title of Dewa-no-kami and was appointed to the guard of the Otemon of Edo Castle. However, the following year he pledged fealty to the new Meiji government and fought in the Boshin War against the remnants of the pro-Tokugawa forces.

Following the reassignment of the Tokugawa clan to Shizuoka Domain, he was transferred to the newly-created Kikuma Domain in Kazusa Province with the same nominal kokudaka and his courtesy title was changed to Ugo-no-kami. he was appointed imperial governor of Kikuma until the abolition of the han system in 1871.

In July 1884, he received the peerage title of viscount (shishaku) under the kazoku peerage system.

He died in 1907 and his grave is at the Denzu-in in Bunkyo, Tokyo.

== Family ==
His wife was the third daughter of Ōkōchi Masatomo, daimyō of Ōtaki Domain

| Preceded by Mizuno Tadanobu | 8th Daimyo of Numazu; 1866-1868 | Succeeded by none |
| Preceded by -none- | 1st Daimyo of Kikuma; 1868-1871 | Succeeded by none |
