= Tanaka Domain =

Edo period Japanese feudal domain in Suruga Province

Tanaka Domain 田中藩
- under Tokugawa shogunate Japan
- 1601–1868
- Capital: Tanaka Castle
- Area
  - Coordinates: 34°52′19.22″N 138°16′28.57″E
  - Type: Daimyō
- Historical era: Edo period
  - Established: 1601
  - Disestablished: 1868
- Today part of: part of Shizuoka Prefecture

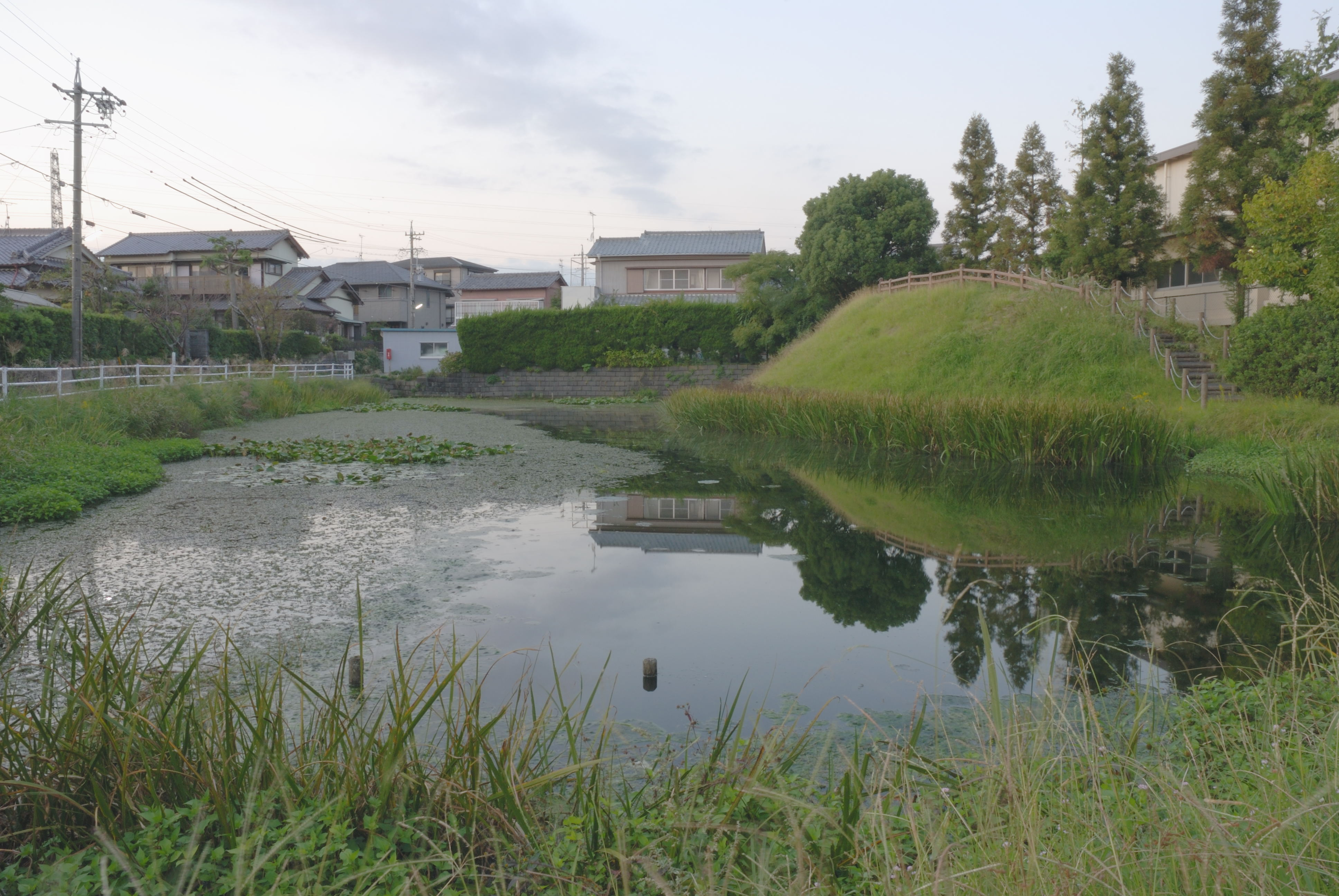
Remnant of the San-no-maru moats of Tanaka Castle

Tanaka Domain (田中藩, Tanaka-han) was a feudal domain under the Tokugawa shogunate of Edo period Japan, located in Suruga Province in what is now modern-day Fujieda, Shizuoka. It was centered around Tanaka Castle. Tanaka Domain was controlled by a large number of fudai daimyō clans in the course of its history, seldom for more than one generation.

== History ==
Tanaka Castle was built by the Imagawa clan as a subsidiary fortification guarding the eastern approaches to Sunpu Castle and was greatly expanded by the Takeda clan after they occupied Suruga Province. After the defeat of the Takeda clan, the castle came under the control of Tokugawa Ieyasu. In 1590, the Tokugawa clan was transferred to the Kanto region by Toyotomi Hideyoshi, who awarded the castle to his retainer, Nakamura Kazutada. Ieyasu regained control after the defeat of the Toyotomi forces at the Battle of Sekigahara.

In 1601, Ieyasu made Sakai Tadatoshi castellan, with a kokudaka of 10,000 koku. This marked the start of Tanaka Domain. Tadatoshi developed Fujieda-juku into a post station on the Tōkaidō, and as a castle town. He was so successful in his efforts that he was rewarded with a larger domain at Kawagoe in Musashi Province in 1607, and Tanaka Domain reverted to direct Shogunal control.

Tanaka Domain was then given to Matsudaira Tadashige, with its kokudaka increased to 25,000 koku in 1633. However, Tadashige was transferred to Kakegawa two years later, and his place was taken Mizuno Tadayoshi, with kokudaka of 45,000 koku. The Mizuno clan was subsequently replaced by the Fujii-Matsudaira, Hōjō, Nishio, Sakai, Tsuchiya, Ōta, Naitō, and Toki clans until Tanaka Domain finally came under the rule of the Honda clan in 1730. The Honda continued to rule Tanaka Domain over seven generations, until the Meiji Restoration of 1868.

After the final Tokugawa Shōgun, Tokugawa Yoshinobu, surrendered his title to Emperor Meiji, he relocated from Edo to Sumpu, with the provinces of Suruga, Izu and Mikawa assigned as his personal domains. Tanaka Domain was included within the area of the new Shizuoka Domain. Thus, in September 1868, Tanaka Domain officially ceased to exist. The final daimyō of Tanaka Domain, Honda Masamori, received the new (and short-lived) domain of Nagao Domain in Awa province in exchange for his previous holdings, and took steps to relocate to that location before the abolition of the han system in 1871.

== Holdings at the end of the Edo period ==
As with most domains in the han system, Tanaka Domain consisted of several discontinuous territories calculated to provide the assigned kokudaka, based on periodic cadastral surveys and projected agricultural yields.

- Shimōsa Province
  - 33 villages in Katsushika District
  - 10 villages in Soma District
- Suruga Province
  - 6 villages in Suntō District
  - 57 villages in Shida District
  - 20 villages in Mashizu District

== List of daimyō ==
#	Name	Tenure	Courtesy title	Court Rank	kokudaka
Sakai clan, 1601-1609 (fudai)
1	Sakai Tadatoshi (酒井 忠利)	1601–1607	Bungo-no-kami (備後守)	Junior 5th Rank, Lower Grade (従五位下)	10,000 koku
tenryō 1607–1635
Matsudaira (Sakurai) clan, 1633-1635 (fudai)
1	Matsudaira Tadashige (松平 忠重)	1633–1635	Daizen-no-suke (大膳亮)	Junior 5th Rank, Lower Grade (従五位下)	25,000 koku
Mizuno clan, 1535-1642 (fudai)
1	Mizuno Tadayoshi (水野 忠善)	1635–1642	Daikenmotsu (大監物)	Junior 5th Rank, Lower Grade (従五位下)	45,000 koku
Matsudaira (Fujii) clan, 1642-1644 (fudai)
1	Matsudaira Tadaharu (松平 忠晴)	1642–1644	Iga-no-kami (伊賀守)	Junior 5th Rank, Lower Grade (従五位下)	25,000 koku
Hōjō clan, 1644-1648 (tozama)
1	Hōjō Ujishige (北条 氏重)	1644–1648	Dewa-no-kami ( 出羽守)	Junior 5th Rank, Lower Grade (従五位下)	25,000 koku
Nishio clan, 1648-1679 (fudai)
1	Nishio Tadateru (西尾 忠照)	1649–1654	Tango-no-kami (丹後守)	Junior 5th Rank, Lower Grade (従五位下)	25,000 koku
2	Nishio Tadanari (西尾 忠成)	1654–1679	Oki-no-kami (隠岐守)	Junior 5th Rank, Lower Grade (従五位下)	25,000 koku
Sakai clan, 1679-1681 (fudai)
1	Sakai Tadayoshi (酒井 忠能)	1679–1681	Hyūga-no-kami(日向守)	Junior 5th Rank, Lower Grade (従五位下)	40,000 koku
Tsuchiya clan, 1681-1684 (fudai)
1	Tsuchiya Masanao (土屋 政直)	1681–1684	Sagami-no-kami (相模守); Jijū (侍従)	Junior 5th Rank, Lower Grade (従五位下)	45,000 koku
Ōta clan, 1684-1705 (fudai)
1	Ōta Sukenao (太田 資直)	1684–1705	Settsu-no-kami (摂津守)	Junior 5th Rank, Lower Grade (従五位下)	50,000 koku
2	Ōta Sukeharu (太田 資晴)	1705	Bitchu-no-kami (備中守)	Junior 4th Rank, Lower Grade (従四位下)	50,000 koku
Naitō clan, 1705-1712 (fudai)
1	Naitō Kazunobu (内藤弌信)	1705–1712	Bizen-no-kami (豊前守)	Junior 4th Rank, Lower Grade (従四位下)	50,000 koku
Toki clan, 1712-1730 (fudai)
1	Toki Yoritaka (土岐頼殷)	1712–1713	Iyo-no-Kami (伊予守)	Junior 4th Rank, Lower Grade (従四位下)	35,000 koku
2	Toki Yoritoshi (土岐頼稔)	1713–1742	Tango-no-kami (丹後守); Jiju (侍従)	Junior 4th Rank, Lower Grade (従四位下)	35,000 koku
Honda clan, 1730-1868 (fudai)
1	Honda Masanori (本多正矩)	1730–1735	Bizen-no-kami (豊前守)	Junior 5th Rank, Lower Grade (従五位下)	40,000 koku
2	Honda Masayoshi (本多正珍)	1735–1773	Hoki-no-kami (伯耆守)	Junior 4th Rank, Lower Grade (従四位下)	40,000 koku
3	Honda Masatomo (本多正供)	1773–1777	Kii-no-kami (紀伊守)	Junior 5th Rank, Lower Grade (従五位下)	40,000 koku
4	Honda Masaharu (本多正温)	1777–1800	Hōki-no-kami (伯耆守)	Junior 5th Rank, Lower Grade (従五位下)	40,000 koku
5	Honda Masaoki (本多正意)	1800–1829	Tōtōmi-no-kami (遠江守)	Junior 5th Rank, Lower Grade (従五位下)	40,000 koku
6	Honda Masahiro (本多正寛)	1829–1850	Tōtōmi-no-kami (遠江守)	Junior 5th Rank, Lower Grade (従五位下)	40,000 koku
7	Honda Masamori (本多正訥)	1850–1868	Kii-no-kami (紀伊守)	Junior 5th Rank, Lower Grade (従五位下)	40,000 koku

=== Honda Masanori ===
Honda Masanori (本多正矩; October 15, 1681 - October 3, 1735) was the 3rd daimyō of Numata Domain in Kōzuke Province and 1st Honda daimyō of Tanaka Domain. The son of a hatamoto, he was adopted as heir to Honda Masatake in 1713 and became daimyō on the latter's death in 1721. In 1723, he served as sōshaban in the shogun's court. In 1730, he was ordered to relocate to Tanaka Domain in Suruga Province, with the same nominal kokudaka of 40,000 koku.

=== Honda Masayoshi ===
Honda Masayoshi (本多 正珍; August 2, 1710 - September 19, 1786) was the 2nd Honda daimyō of Tanaka Domain. Masayoshi was the third son of Honda Masanori. He was presented in formal audience to the Shōgun in 1725, and received the courtesy title of Kii-no-kami. He became daimyō on his father's death in 1735. In 1737, he served as sōshaban in the shogun's court and in 1739 he was appointed Jisha-bugyō. In 1746, he promoted to rōjū and received the courtesy title of Hōki-no-kami and the honorific title of chamberlain in 1747. he resigned his posts in 1758 due to accusations of mishandling a major peasant uprising in Mino Province and was ordered the shave his head in atonement. He retired in 1773 and died in 1768. His grave is at the temple of Renshō-ji in Fujieda. His wife was a daughter of Matsudaira Nobutoki of Yoshida Domain.

=== Honda Masatomo ===
Honda Masatomo (本多正供; October 27, 1746 - July 14, 1777) was the 3rd Honda daimyō of Tanaka Domain. Masatomo was born in Edo as the second son of Honda Masayoshi, and became heir on the death of his eldest brother in 1757. He was presented in formal audience to the Shōgun in 1761, and received the courtesy title of Kii-no-kami. He became daimyō on his father's retirement in 1773. Although he encouraged the development of martial arts within the domain, he died after a short tenure in 1777. His grave is at the temple of Tokuhon-ji in Asakusa, Tokyo. He did not have a formal wife.

=== Honda Masaharu ===
Honda Masaharu (本多正温; January 29, 1767 - June 2, 1838) was the 4th Honda daimyō of Tanaka Domain. Masaharu was born in Edo as the eldest son of Honda Masatomo, and became daimyō on the death of his father in 1777. Due to his youth, the shogunate appointed his uncle, Kuroda Naokuni, as regent. He was presented in formal audience to the Shōgun in 1782, and received the courtesy title of Hōki-no-kami. The shogunate ordered Tanaka Domain to take control of Sagara Castle after the dispossession of Tanuma Okitsugu in 1787.In 1798 he changed his name from Masatoku to Masaharu. In 1794, he brought Kishu mikan trees from Kii Province to his domain, establishing the start of the orange industry in Shizuoka. In 1799, the shogunate ordered him to reconstruct Edo's Yushima Seidō. However, due to a peasant's revolt in his domain, he retired from office in 1800. He died in 1831 and his grave is at the temple of Tokuhon-ji in Asakusa, Tokyo. His wife was a daughter of Nagao Naoyoshi of Takatsuka Domain.

=== Honda Masaoki ===
Honda Masaoki (本多正意; October 29, 1784 - June 28, 1829) was the 5th Honda daimyō of Tanaka Domain. Masaoki was born in Edo as the eldest son of Honda Masaharu. Masaharu had divorced his wife earlier that year, not realizing that she was pregnant and Masaoki was born at the Nagai clan's Edo residence. After he received word of the birth, he agreed to take Masaoki as his heir. He became daimyō on his father's retirement in 1800. In 1808, he served as sōshaban in the shogun's court. He was noted for encouraging education within the domain, including financial incentives similar to a modern scholarship program for people with financial difficulties; however, this applied only to the samurai class, and the peasants rose in revolt again in 1816 after a typhoon resulted in a crop failure. In 1822, he was appointed Jisha-bugyō and in 1825 was promoted to wakadoshiyori, with his courtesy title changed to Tōtōmi-no-kami. He died in 1829 and his grave is at the temple of Tokuhon-ji in Asakusa, Tokyo. His wife was a daughter of Toda Takanaka of Utsunomiya Domain.

=== Honda Masahiro ===
Honda Masahiro (本多正寛; June 2, 1808 - March 9, 1860) was the 6th Honda daimyō of Tanaka Domain. Masaoki was born in Edo as the eldest son of Honda Masaoki and became daimyō on his father's death in 1829. During his tenure he attempted to reform the financial situation of the domain through planting new crops, encouraging wood, oil and charcoal production and domain monopolies on certain goods. In 1836, he served as sōshaban and in 1837 he opened a han school. He also modernized the domain's military forces by creating a rifle brigade and by purchasing artillery. The domain suffered considerable damage during the 1854 Tōkai earthquake. He died in 1860 at the age of 53. His wife was a daughter of Matsudaira Naritaka of Tsuyama Domain.

=== Honda Masamori ===
Honda Masamori (本多 正訥; March 7, 1827 – November 1, 1885) was the 7th (and final) daimyō of Tanaka Domain. Masamori was the younger brother of Honda Masahiro, and became daimyō on his brother's death in 1860. After the Meiji restoration, he was forced to relocate from Tanaka to newly created Nagao Domain in Awa province, with the same nominal revenue of 40,000 koku. He retired in 1870 and died in 1885.

== See also ==
- List of Han
- Abolition of the han system
