= Nobutoshi =

- Gender: Male

Origin
- Origin: Japanese
- Meaning: Different meanings depending on the kanji used

Nobutoshi (written: 延年, 信敏, 喜稔 or 暢年) is a masculine Japanese given name. Notable people with the name include:

- Nobutoshi Akao (赤尾 信敏) (born 1937), Japanese diplomat
- Nobutoshi Canna (神奈 延年) (born 1968), Japanese voice actor
- Nobutoshi Hikage (日蔭 暢年) (born 1956), Japanese judoka
- Nobutoshi Kaneda (金田 喜稔) (born 1958), Japanese footballer
- Nobutoshi Kihara (木原 信敏) (1926–2011), Japanese electronics engineer
- Matsudaira Nobutoshi (Takiwaki) (松平 信敏) (1851–1887), Japanese daimyō
- Oda Nobutoshi (織田 信敏) (1853–1901), Japanese daimyō
