= Jōzai Domain =

Jōzai Domain 請西藩
- under Tokugawa shogunate Japan
- 1825–1871
- Capital: Kaifuchi jin'ya (1825–50); Jōzai jin'ya (1850–68); Sakurai jin'ya (1868–71)
  - Type: Daimyō
- Historical era: Edo period
  - Established: 1825
  - Disestablished: 1871
- Today part of: part of Chiba Prefecture

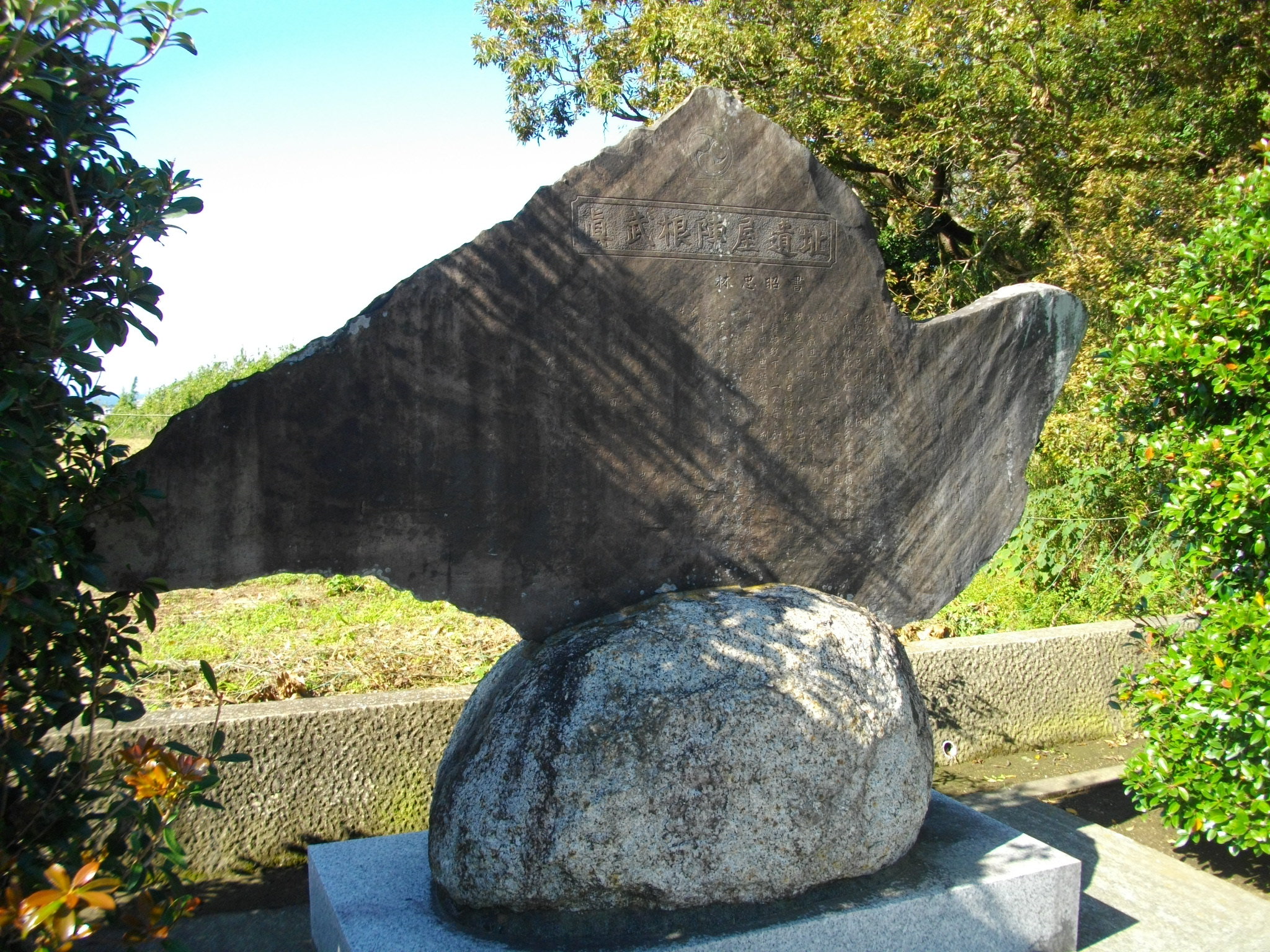
Site of Mabuchi Jin’ya, administrative center of Jōzai Domain

Jōzai Domain (請西藩, Jōzai-han) was a feudal domain under the Tokugawa shogunate of Edo period Japan, located in Kazusa Province (modern-day Chiba Prefecture), Japan. The domain was centered on Manube jin’ya, in what is now the city of Kisarazu, Chiba. It was ruled for the entirety of its history by a branch of the Mizuno clan. Relatively small in size, it played an important role at the end of its existence, during the Boshin War of the Meiji Restoration.

== History ==
=== Kaibuchi-han ===
Shōgun Tokugawa Ienari's attendant (osobashu) Hayashi Tadafusa was promoted from hatamoto to wakadoshiyori, or junior councilor in April 1825. Receiving an addition of 3,000 koku on top of his 7,000 koku stipend, he thus passed the 10,000 koku qualification to become a daimyō, and was assigned a small holding in Kazusa Province: Kaibuchi (貝淵藩, Kaibuchi-han) was created. He received an additional 3,000 koku in revenue in December 1834, and after being assigned to supervise reconstruction efforts at Edo Castle in 1839, was granted another 5,000 koku, bringing his total income up to 18,000 koku. However, on the death of Ienari, he was stripped of his position and residence and forced into retirement, with his income reduced to 10,000 koku.

In November 1850, during the headship of Tadafusa's son Hayashi Tadaakira, the family moved the location of its jin'ya within its landholdings, from Kaibuchi Village to Jōzai Village, and for the rest of its time under Hayashi rule, the domain was known as Jōzai.

=== Jōzai-han ===
After Hayashi Tadaakira's relocation of the domain seat from Kaibuchi to Jōzai, the domain found itself in a strategic location with the arrival of Commodore Matthew C. Perry and the American fleet. On June 4, 1853, coastal defenses at Kaibuchi, which lay on Edo Bay, were strengthened, and were kept at that level of preparation until March 23, 1854. The focus for the Hayashi family then shifted once more to positions in the shogunate, with Tadaakira's successor Hayashi Tadakata first becoming Captain of the Guard (ōbangashira), and then Magistrate of Fushimi. With Tadakata's death, the domain headship passed into the hands of his brother and adopted heir, Hayashi Masanosuke, or as he is more often known, Tadataka (忠崇)

With the start of the Boshin War, Hayashi Tadataka was at Jōzai, and though he was not able to participate in the Battle of Toba–Fushimi, he set himself apart from all other fudai lords in that he invoked his hereditary obligation to the Tokugawa clan in going to war. Taking part in the guerrilla warfare efforts of Hitomi Katsutarō, Tadataka departed his domain with his entire retainer force, and fought from Izu Province all the way north to Aizu and Sendai as part of the Ōuetsu Reppan Dōmei, finally surrendering when he received news that the main Tokugawa family had been given a fief at Sunpu (modern-day Shizuoka), in Suruga Province. However, in punishment for Tadataka's actions, Jōzai was taken over by the new government. Tadataka himself was placed in confinement at the Edo residence of the Ogasawara family of Karatsu, of which his family was a branch line. He was later released, and held several government positions before his retirement, and was also made a baron (danshaku) in the kazoku peerage. Hayashi Tadataka was the last of the former daimyōs to die, in 1941.

=== Sakurai-han ===
Following Tadataka's departure from Jōzai, the domain was reassigned to Matsudaira Nobutoshi (head of the Takiwaki branch of the Matsudaira clan), and renamed Sakurai-han (桜井藩) After the abolition of the han system in July 1871, Sakurai Domain became “Sakurai Prefecture”, which merged with the short lived “Kisarazu Prefecture” in November 1871, which later became part of Chiba Prefecture.

== Holdings at the end of the Edo period ==
As with most domains in the han system, Kururi Domain consisted of several discontinuous territories calculated to provide the assigned kokudaka, based on periodic cadastral surveys and projected agricultural yields.

=== As Jōzai Domain ===
- Kazusa Province
  - 1 village in Sue District
  - 17 villages in Moda District
  - 13 villages in Ichihara District
- Kōzuke Province
  - 1 village in Yamada District

=== As Sakurai Domain ===
- Kazusa Province
  - 26 villages in Sue District
  - 25 villages in Moda District
  - 1 village in Ichihara District

== List of daimyōs ==
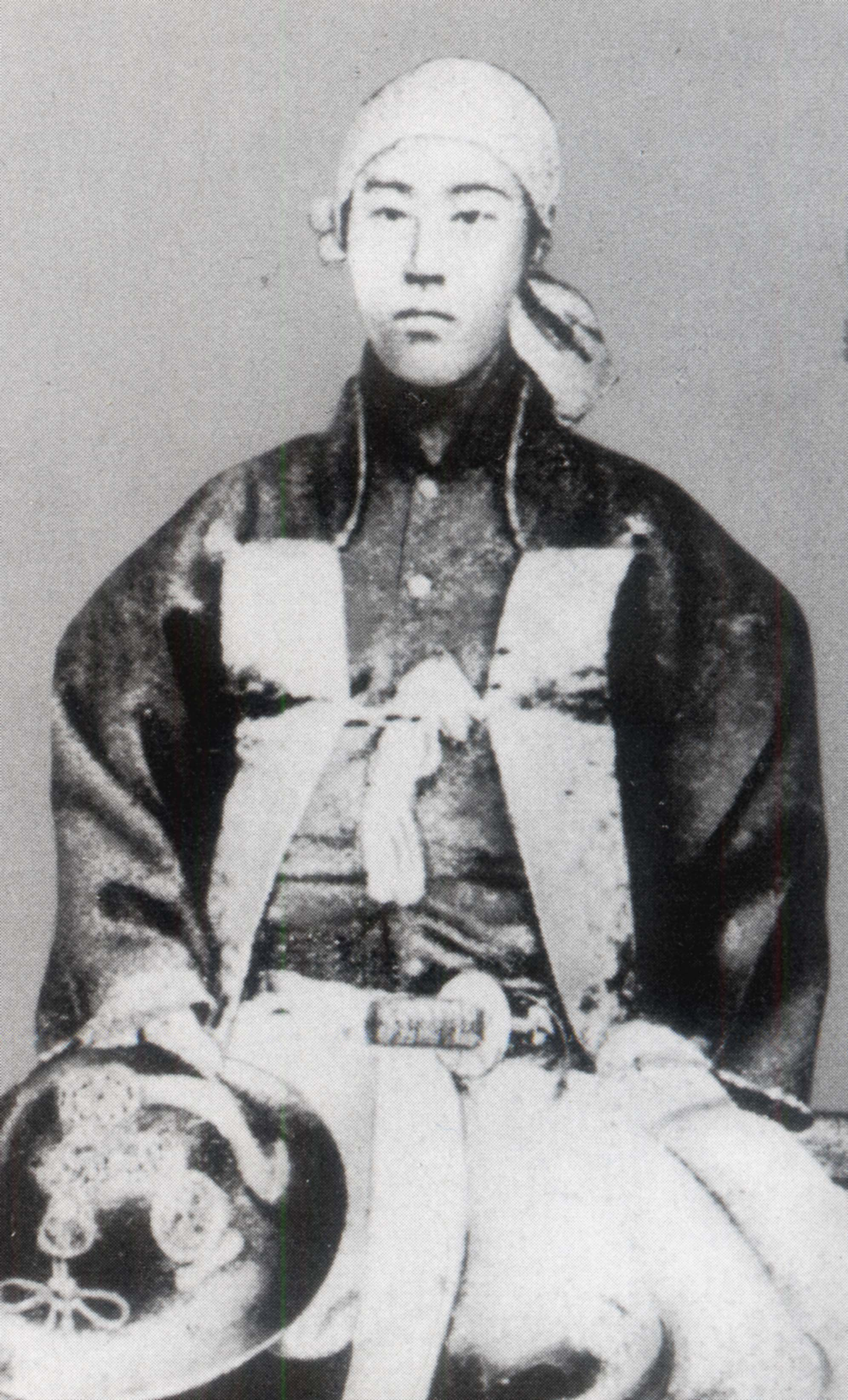
The last daimyō of Jōzai, Hayashi Tadataka

#	Name	Tenure	Courtesy title	Court Rank	kokudaka
Hayashi clan (fudai) 1825–1868
1	Hayashi Tadafusa (林忠英)	1825–1841	Higo-no-kami (肥後守)	Lower 5th (従五位下)	13,000->18,000->10,000
2	Hayashi Tadaakira (林忠旭)	1841–1854	Harima-no-kami (播磨守)	Lower 5th (従五位下)	10,000 koku
3	Hayashi Tadakata (林忠交)	1854–1867	Higo-no-kami (肥後守)	Lower 5th (従五位下)	10,000 koku
4	Hayashi Tadataka (林忠崇)	1867–1868	-none-	5th (従五位)	10,000 koku
Matsudaira (Takiwaki) clan (fudai) 1868–1872
1	Matsudaira Nobutoshi (松平信敏)	1868-1871	Tango-no-kami (丹後守)	Lower 5th (従五位下)	10,000 koku
