= Tadatomo =

- Gender: Male

Origin
- Origin: Japanese
- Meaning: Different meanings depending on the kanji used

Tadatomo (written: 忠友, 忠朝 or 忠智) is a masculine Japanese given name. Notable people with the name include:

- Honda Tadatomo (本多 忠朝; 1582–1615), Japanese samurai
- Mizuno Tadatomo (水野 忠友; 1731–1802), Japanese samurai
- Ōkubo Tadatomo (大久保 忠朝; 1632–1712), Japanese daimyō
- Tadatomo Yoshida (吉田 忠智), Japanese politician
