= Ōkubo Tadasuke =

Japanese daimyō (1537–1613)

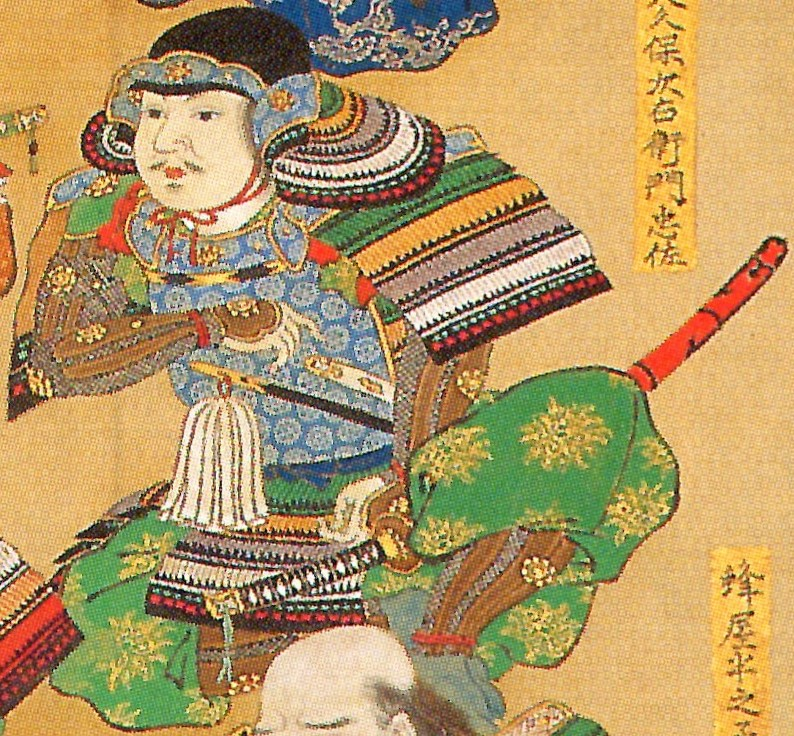
Memorial of Okubo Tadasuke

Ōkubo Tadasuke (大久保 忠佐; 1537 – 9 November 1613) was a Japanese daimyō of the Sengoku period and early Edo period. He was the head of Numazu Domain in Suruga Province.

In 1572, He participate in the battle of Hitokotosaka along with Honda Tadakatsu against Takeda clan forces.

Tadasuke participated in many Ieyasu's important battles including the conquest of Takeda clan, battle of Komaki and Nagakute, and the decisive battle of Sekigahara. He eventually became a feudal lord with 20,000 koku of land at Numazu, Suruga Province. Tadasuke died on September 27, 1613 (Keicho 18) without an heir, and his 20,000 koku of Numazu was confiscated.

It was recorded that despite participated in many battles, Tadasuke never received single wounds during his career.

Jōzan Yuasa, a samurai retainer of Okayama clan and confucian scholar who authored many anecdotes during Edo period, has recorded that Tadasuke once boasted he only ever received 13 wounds in battle during his lifetime as soldier.

When he died in 1613, he left no heir; and the domain reverted to the Tokugawa shogunate.

Preceded by ______	Daimyō of Numazu; 1601–1613	Succeeded by Mizuno Tadatomo
