= Akao =

Akao (written: 赤尾) is a Japanese surname. Notable people with the surname include:

- Akira Akao (赤尾 公, born 1988), Japanese footballer
- Bin Akao (赤尾 敏, 1899–1990), Japanese ultra-rightist
- Hikaru Akao (赤尾 ひかる, born 1995), Japanese voice actress
- Akao Kiyotsuna (赤尾 清綱, 1514–1573), Japanese samurai
- Nobutoshi Akao (赤尾 信敏, born 1937), Japanese diplomat
- Yoji Akao (赤尾 洋二, 1928–2016), Japanese business theorist
