= Ikawa, Shizuoka =

Ikawa 井川村
- Former municipality
- Location in Japan
- Coordinates: 35.217°N 138.250°E
- Country: Japan
- Region: Chūbu region (Tōkai region)
- Prefecture: Shizuoka
- District: Abe District
- Merged: January 1, 1969 (now part of Aoi-ku, Shizuoka)

Area
  - Total: 498.90 km^{2} (192.63 sq mi)

Population (April 1, 2005)
  - Total: 2,471
  - Density: 4.95/km^{2} (12.8/sq mi)
- Time zone: UTC+09:00 (JST)

Ikawa (井川村, Ikawa-mura) was a village located in Abe District, Shizuoka Prefecture, Japan.

On January 1, 1969 Ikawa joined with neighboring Shizuoka city. It is now part of Aoi-ku, Shizuoka.

As of January 1, 1969-final population data before the amalgamation, the town had an estimated population of 2,471 and a density of 4.95 persons per km^{2}. The total area was 498.90 km^{2}.

Ikawa, located in the mountainous area between Shizuoka and Yamanashi Prefecture is the location of Ikawa Dam, a major hydroelectric power plant for Shizuoka Prefecture. It is also a popular sightseeing location for local residents. "Ikawa Menpa" which is a lacquered hinoki wooden lunch box is a local speciality.
