= Numazu Military Academy =

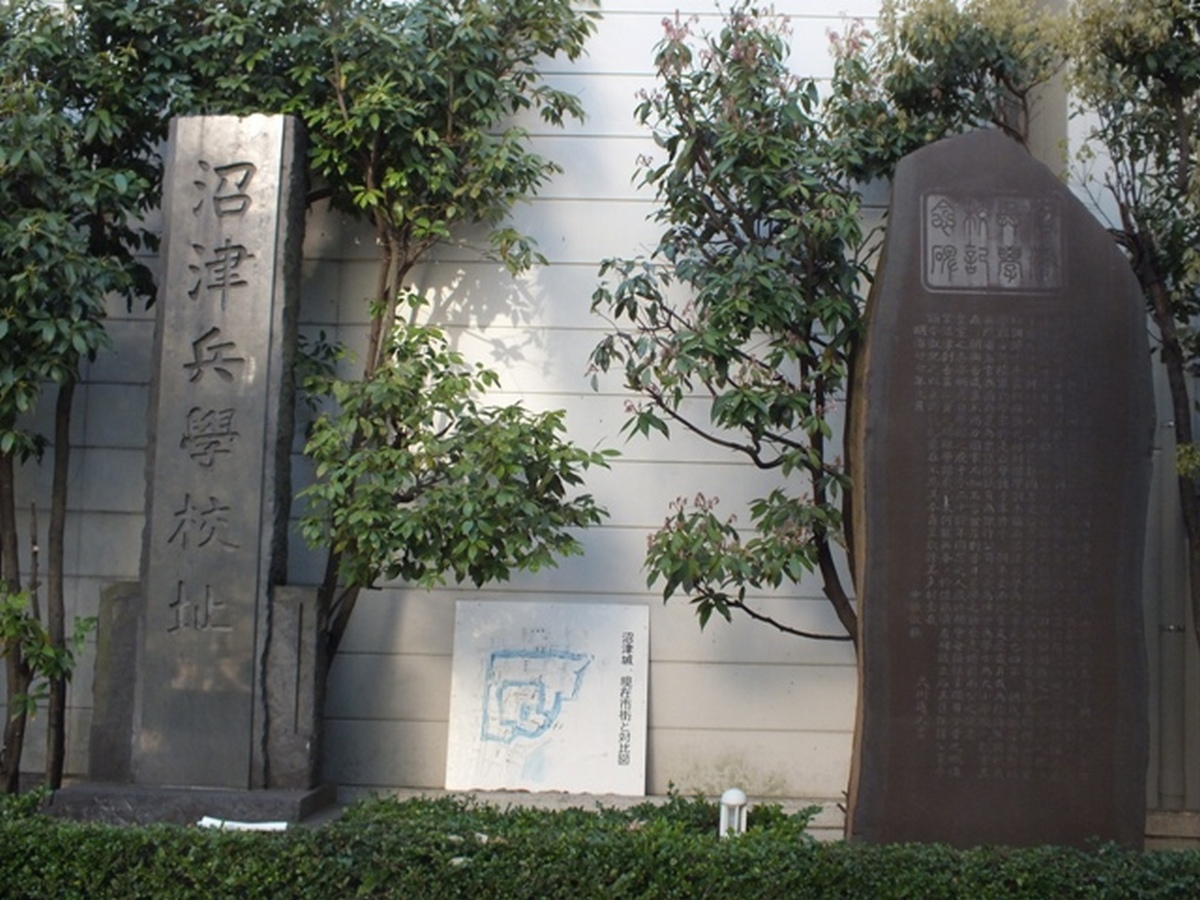
Monument marking location of the Numazu Military Academy within the grounds of Numazu Castle

Numazu Military Academy (沼津兵学校, Numazu heigakkō) was one of the first schools organized along western lines in Japan, and was located in Numazu, Shizuoka. Although the academy operated only from December 1868 to 1871, it made a major contribution to the development of public education in Japan. It was later merged into the Imperial Japanese Army Academy.

== History ==
During the Bakumatsu period, the Tokugawa shogunate belatedly attempted to modernize its military forces with the assistance of French military advisors. The attempt was ultimately unsuccessful, and following the Boshin War of the Meiji restoration, the Tokugawa clan, formerly masters of the country with revenues of over eight million koku, were reduced to 700,000 koku, spread across the provinces of Suruga, Tōtōmi and Mikawa, with the head of the clan, Tokugawa Iesato, moving to reside at Numazu. At this time, a group of hatamoto, led by Ebara Soroku, Abe Kuninosuke and Yatabori Keizō returned from studies in the Netherlands, and decided to establish a military academy along western lines within the grounds of Numazu Castle in December 1868.

The curriculum of the academy included English and French language and conversation, physics and chemistry, geography, astronomy, world history and economic theory. The curriculum was also weighed towards mathematics, particularly geometry and trigonometry, where were regarded as essential military subjects due to their usage in navigation, artillery targeting and surveying. The first head of the academy was Nishi Amane, who was a driving force behind the creation and elementary school associated with the military academy, which is now regarded as Japan’s first western-style elementary school.

In 1869, the first Japanese textbook on military engineering was published by the Numazu Military Academy.

On November 12, 1871 the academy came under the direct control of the Ministry of War and in 1872, it was closed, and moved to Tokyo, where it was merged with the new Imperial Japanese Army Academy.

Although in existence for only four years, its 210 academy graduates and 150 elementary school graduates included many who went on to serve as generals in the Imperial Japanese Army, admirals in the Imperial Japanese Navy or as noted educators or politicians. Its elementary school served as a model for other elementary schools which were soon established throughout Japan.

The Numazu Military Academy was also the subject of the first film of director Tadashi Imai in 1939.
