= Hayashi clan =

The Hayashi clan (林氏, Hayashi-shi) was the name of several Japanese clans, of varying origin.

- Hayashi clan (Owari) of Owari Province (a branch of the Inaba clan)
- Hayashi clan (Confucian scholars) of Confucian scholars (founded by Hayashi Razan, came to prominence in the early Edo period, scholarly advisors to Tokugawa Ieyasu)
- Hayashi clan (Jōzai) of the Jōzai Domain (descended from the Ogasawara clan)
