= Hayashi clan (Jōzai) =

Hayashi 林
- Home province: Kazusa
- Parent house: Seiwa Genji
- Titles: Various
- Final ruler: Hayashi Tadataka
- Ruled until: 1868, defeat in the Boshin War

The Hayashi clan (林氏, Hayashi-shi), onetime ruling family of the Jōzai Domain, is a Japanese clan which traces its origins to the Ogasawara clan, the shugo of Shinano Province, and through the Takeda clan, from the Seiwa Genji. The family served the Matsudaira (later Tokugawa) clan from its days in Mikawa Province. It became a family of hatamoto under the Tokugawa shogunate; in 1825, upon receiving a raise in income to 10,000 koku (thanks to the family head Tadafusa, who was then a wakadoshiyori), the Hayashi family entered the ranks of the daimyōs.

The Hayashi family was famous during the Boshin War because of the actions of its head, Hayashi Tadataka, in the fight against the imperial army. The Hayashi became commoners after Tadataka's surrender late in 1868; however, later on in the Meiji period, Tadataka's adopted son Tadahiro received the title of Danshaku (Baron) in the new kazoku system of peerage.

== See also ==
- Jōzai Domain
- Hayashi clan (disambiguation)
