= Ikawa Dam =

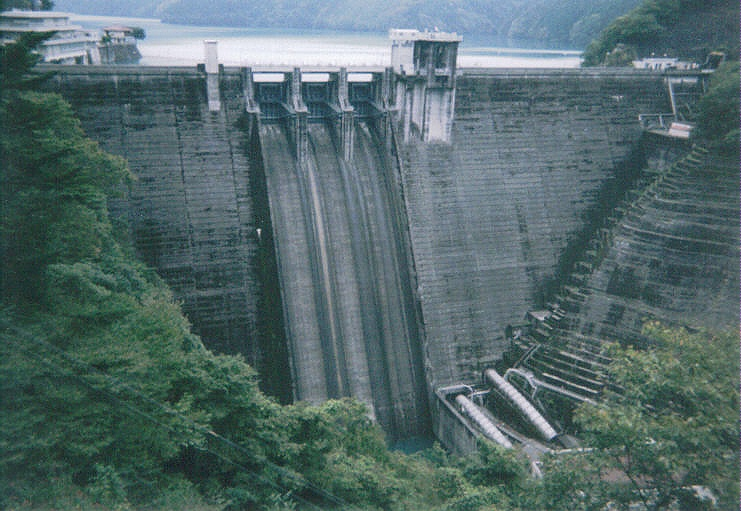
- Interactive map of Ikawa Dam
- Official name: 井川ダム
- Location: Shizuoka Prefecture, Japan
- Coordinates: 35°12′38″N 138°13′22″E
- Construction began: 1952
- Opening date: 1957
- Operator: Chubu Electric Power

Dam and spillways
- Type of dam: Gravity
- Impounds: Ōi River
- Height: 103.6 m (340 ft)
- Length: 243 m (797 ft)

Reservoir
- Creates: Ikawa-ko
- Total capacity: 150,000,000 m^{3} (5.3×10^{9} cu ft)
- Catchment area: 459.2 km^{2} (177.3 sq mi)
- Surface area: 422 hectares

The Ikawa Dam (井川ダム, Ikawa damu) is a dam on the Ōi River in Aoi-ku, Shizuoka, Shizuoka Prefecture on the island of Honshū, Japan. It was the first hollow core concrete gravity dam to be constructed in Japan, and has a hydroelectric power generating station owned by the Chubu Electric Power Company.

== History ==
The potential of the Ōi River valley for hydroelectric power development was realized by the Meiji government at the start of the 20th century. The Ōi River was characterized by a high volume of flow and a fast current. Its mountainous upper reaches and tributaries were areas of steep valleys and abundant rainfall, and were sparsely populated.

In 1906, a joint venture company, the Anglo-Japanese Hydroelectric Company (日英水力電気, Nichiei Suiroku Denki) was established, and began studies and design work on plans to exploit the potential of the Ōi River and Fuji River in Shizuoka Prefecture. The British interests were bought out by 1921, and electrical production nationalized under the aegis of the Japan Electric Generation and Transmission Company (日本発送電株式会社, Nippon Hassoden K.K.) in 1938. The first dams on the Ōi River were completed in the late 1920s and early 1930s, but further work was suspended by the Great Depression of the 1930s, and World War II in the 1940s. However, by the early 1950s, Japan's need for electrical energy was growing exponentially, especially in the industrial belt near Nagoya. After the breakup of Nippon Hassoden at the end of World War II into various regional power utilities, the bulk of the dams on the Ōi River came under the control of Chubu Electric Power.

== Design ==
Design work on the Ikawa Dam began in 1951, with construction starting in 1952 with a foreign aid grant from OCI, facilitated by the American occupation authorities. The dam design introduced the technique of hollow-core concrete construction to Japan, which had previously been used with success in Italy. There was initial resistance to the technique by Japanese civil engineers, who were concerned with the earthquake resistance of the design, but the number of successful applications in earthquake-prone areas of northern Italy together with the economics of using less concrete swayed the decision towards the new technology. Construction of the 103.6 metres (340 ft) tall dam was facilitated by its location on the Ōigawa Railway Ikawa Line, and was completed in 1957. The associated Ikawa Hydroelectric Power Plant produces 62,000 KW of power.

As a result of the lake created by the Ikawa Dam, the village of Ikawa was submerged, and its 550 households had to be relocated.

Lake Ikawa (井川湖, Ikawa-ko) serves as an important source of tap water, industrial water and irrigation water in Shizuoka Prefecture. The lake is stocked with cherry salmon, carp and trout, and is a popular fishing spot. A museum established by Chubu Electric Power near the lake has exhibits relating to the history and construction of the dam, and on hydroelectric power in general.

== Surroundings ==
Public access to the dam and its lake are by Shizuoka Prefectural Road 60, with bus connections to Shizuoka Station or Shin-Shizuoka Station.
