= Ōhama Domain =

Japanese domain of the Edo period

The Ōhama Domain (大浜藩, Ōhama-han) was a Japanese domain of the Edo period. It was associated with Shinano Province in modern-day Nagano Prefecture.

In the han system, Ōhama was a political and economic abstraction based on periodic cadastral surveys and projected agricultural yields. In other words, the domain was defined in terms of kokudaka, not land area. This was different from the feudalism of the West.

== History ==
The domain only existed for a few years. It ended in 1777.

The hereditary daimyō was head of the clan and head of the domain. In Ōhama, the sole daimyō of Ōhama was Mizuno Tadatomo. Tadatomo had been a high-income hatamoto with holdings in the Saku district of Shinano Province He was a page and later an assistant to the 10th shōgun, Tokugawa Ienari. In 1768, Mizuno became a head of the han of over 10,000 koku.

Tadatomo's family was later transferred to the Numazu Domain; and a cadet branch of the Mizuno clan remained at Numazu until the Meiji Restoration.

== See also ==
- List of Han
- Abolition of the han system
