= Hayashi Tadataka =

Japanese samurai and daimyō

Tadataka Hayashi
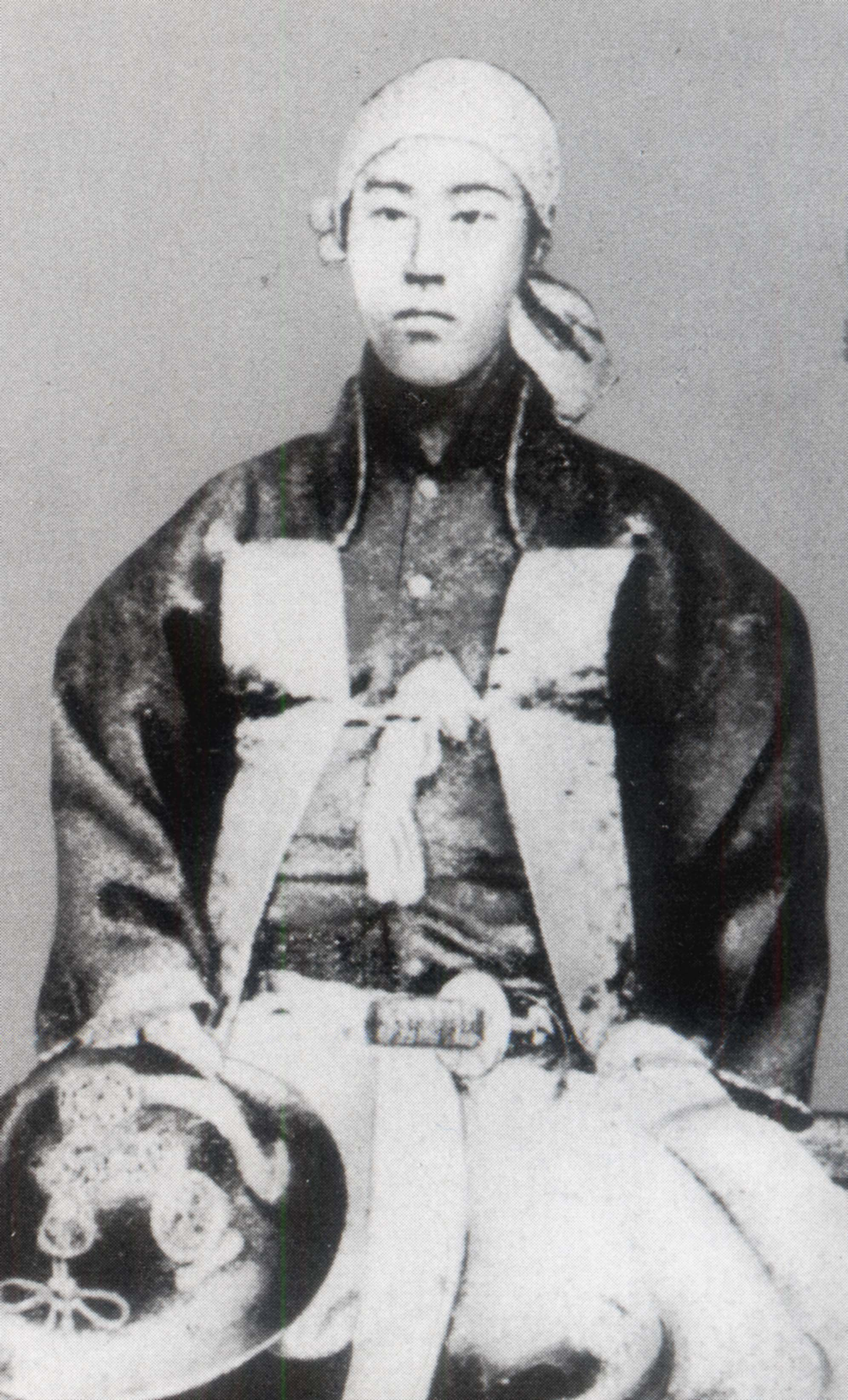
- Tadataka Hayashi in 1868

4th Daimyō of Jōzai
- In office 1867–1868
- Preceded by: [Hayashi Tadakata]]
- Succeeded by: none

Personal details
- Born: August 26, 1848 Edo, Tokugawa Shogunate
- Died: January 22, 1941 (aged 92) Tokyo, Empire of Japan
- Spouse: Kojima Chise

Tadataka Hayashi (林 忠崇, Hayashi Tadataka; August 26, 1848 – January 22, 1941) was a Japanese samurai and daimyō of the late Edo period, who ruled the Jōzai Domain. Later in life, he was also known by his style, Ichimu (一夢). During the Boshin War of 1868, Hayashi led his domain's forces in support of the armies of the former shōgun, and then the Ōuetsu Reppan Dōmei. Unlike the Tokugawa forces that went on to Ezo, Hayashi surrendered willingly when he received word that the Tokugawa family was to be granted a fief in Shizuoka. During the Meiji period he worked in various occupations (even as a clerk for a business in Hakodate), before working for the government. In the Meiji period, his family was ennobled as part of the kazoku system. For a time he also served at Tōshō-gū in Nikkō. Hayashi lived well into the 20th century, and was famous as "the last daimyō." He died in early 1941, in an apartment run by his daughter Mitsu.

When asked for a jisei on the day he died, he is reported to have said, "I had one in 1868. Not now." (明治元年にやつた。今は無い)

Hayashi appears as a character in Ikenami Shōtarō's novel Bakumatsu Yūgekitai.

Preceded by Hayashi Tadakata	4th Daimyō of Jōzai (Hayashi); 1867–1868	Succeeded by none
Preceded by Hayashi Tadakata	4th Jōzai-Hayashi family head 1867–1868	Succeeded by Hayashi Tadahiro
