= Matsudaira Nobutoshi (Takiwaki) =

Japanese daimyō (1851–1887)

Matsudaira Nobutoshi (松平信敏) (September 18, 1851 – August 10, 1887) was a Japanese daimyō of the late Edo period. He was first the lord of the Ojima Domain (in Suruga Province); however, with Tokugawa Iesato's move into Suruga, Nobutoshi's holdings were moved to the Sakurai Domain in 1868, which comprised the territory of the former Jōzai Domain. He ruled Sakurai for three years until it was disestablished in 1871 with the abolition of the han system.

Preceded by Matsudaira Nobufumi	11th Daimyō of Ojima (Takiwaki-Matsudaira); 1864–1868	Succeeded by none
Preceded by none	1st Daimyō of Sakurai (Takiwaki-Matsudaira); 1868–1871	Succeeded by none
