= Nobutoshi Akao =

Japanese diplomat

- Born: 7 December 1937 (age 88); Gifu Prefecture
- Occupation: Diplomat

Nobutoshi Akao (赤尾 信敏, Akao Nobutoshi; born 7 December 1937 in Gifu Prefecture) is a Japanese diplomat. Akao entered the Japanese Ministry of Foreign Affairs in 1961. Served as Japanese Ambassador to Thailand from November 1999 to December 2002.
