= Abe District, Shizuoka =

Former district in Shizuoka prefecture, Japan

Coordinates: 34°58′30″N 138°23′01″E

Abe District (安倍郡, Abe-gun) was formerly a rural district located in Shizuoka Prefecture, Japan. The entire area of the district is now within modern Shizuoka City, with the original core area corresponding to the extension of Aoi Ward.

== History ==
Abe District was one of the original districts of Suruga Province. Modern Abe District was established in the July 22, 1878, cadastral reforms initiated by the Meiji government with one town (Shizuoka) and 114 villages. In a round of consolidation on April 1, 1889, Shizuoka was elevated to city status and the number of villages was reduced to 15 villages. However, on April 1, 1896, Udo District was merged with Abe District, bringing in two towns (Shimizu and Irie) and raising the total number of villages to 23. Irie Town merged with the towns of Irie and Tsuji from Haibara District on January 13, 1924. However, Irie then merged with Shimizu to form the city of Shimizu on February 11 of the same year. The city of Shizuoka gradually annexed the remaining 20 villages between 1928 and 1968. On January 1, 1969, Abe District was formally dissolved after the remaining villages of Ōkōchi, Umegashima, Tamakawa, Ikawa, Kiyosawa, and Ōkawa merged in the city of Shizuoka.
