= Sunpu jōdai =

Castellan of Sunpu Castle in Edo period Japan

Sunpu jōdai (駿府城代) were officials of the Tokugawa shogunate with responsibility for holding and defending Sunpu Castle (Sunpu-jō), also called Shizuoka Castle.

Appointments to the prominent office of castle warden at Sunpu Domain were exclusively fudai daimyōs. Conventional interpretations have construed these Japanese titles as "commissioner" or "overseer" or "governor".

== List of Sunpu jōdai ==
- Toki Tomoaki, 1859–1863.

== See also ==
- Bugyō
