= Mizuno Tadatomo =

Mizuno Tadatomo (水野 忠友, 1731–1802) was a Japanese samurai of the Edo period.

== Career ==
Mizuno was an official in the Tokugawa shogunate. He was a junior counselor (wakadoshiyori) in the 1770s. From 3 November 1871 to 3 May 1788, he was a senior counselor (rōjū) at the top of the shōgun's hierarchy.

In the political struggles of his time, he was a member of the faction headed by Tanuma Okitsugu. He managed to survive Tanuma's downfall; and he worked for a time with Matsudaira Sadanobu.
