= Honda clan =

Japanese clan

Honda 本多
- The emblem (mon) of the Honda clan
- Home province: Mikawa
- Parent house: Fujiwara clan
- Titles: Viscount; Daimyō; Hatamoto; Baron
- Dissolution: still extant

The Honda clan (Japanese: 本多氏, Hepburn: Honda-shi or Honda-uji) is a Japanese family that claims descent from the medieval court noble Fujiwara no Kanemichi. The family settled in Mikawa and served the Matsudaira clan as retainers. Later, when the main Matsudaira family became the Tokugawa clan, the Honda rose in prestige. The clan includes thirteen branches who had daimyō status, and forty-five who had hatamoto status. Arguably the most famous members of the Honda clan were the 16th century samurai general Honda Shigetsugu and Honda Tadakatsu. Two of the major branches of the clan claim descent from Tadakatsu, or his close relative Honda Masanobu.

== Origins ==
The Honda clan descended from the Fujiwara clan through Fujiwara no Kanemichi. The clan was founded by Kanemichi's son, Akimitsu's 11th generation descendant, Honda Sukehide. Sukehide lived in Bungo Province (present-day Ōita Prefecture), Honda, and took the family name from his place of residence.

== History ==
Honda Sukehide's son Sukesada became a retainer to shogun Ashikaga Takauji. For his service to the Ashikaga shogunate, Sukesada was rewarded territory in the Owari Province.

Honda Yasutoshi's second son, Tadasuke, became a hatamoto. During the time of Honda Tadahiro, during Bakumatsu, the clan was listed as a daimyo and established a 10,000 koku domain, the Nishibata Domain, in Mikawa Province. On July 8, 1884, Honda Tadayuki was appointed Viscount.
