= Sunpu Castle =

Castle in Japan

Sunpu Castle 駿府城
- Aoi-ku, Shizuoka, Shizuoka prefecture, Japan
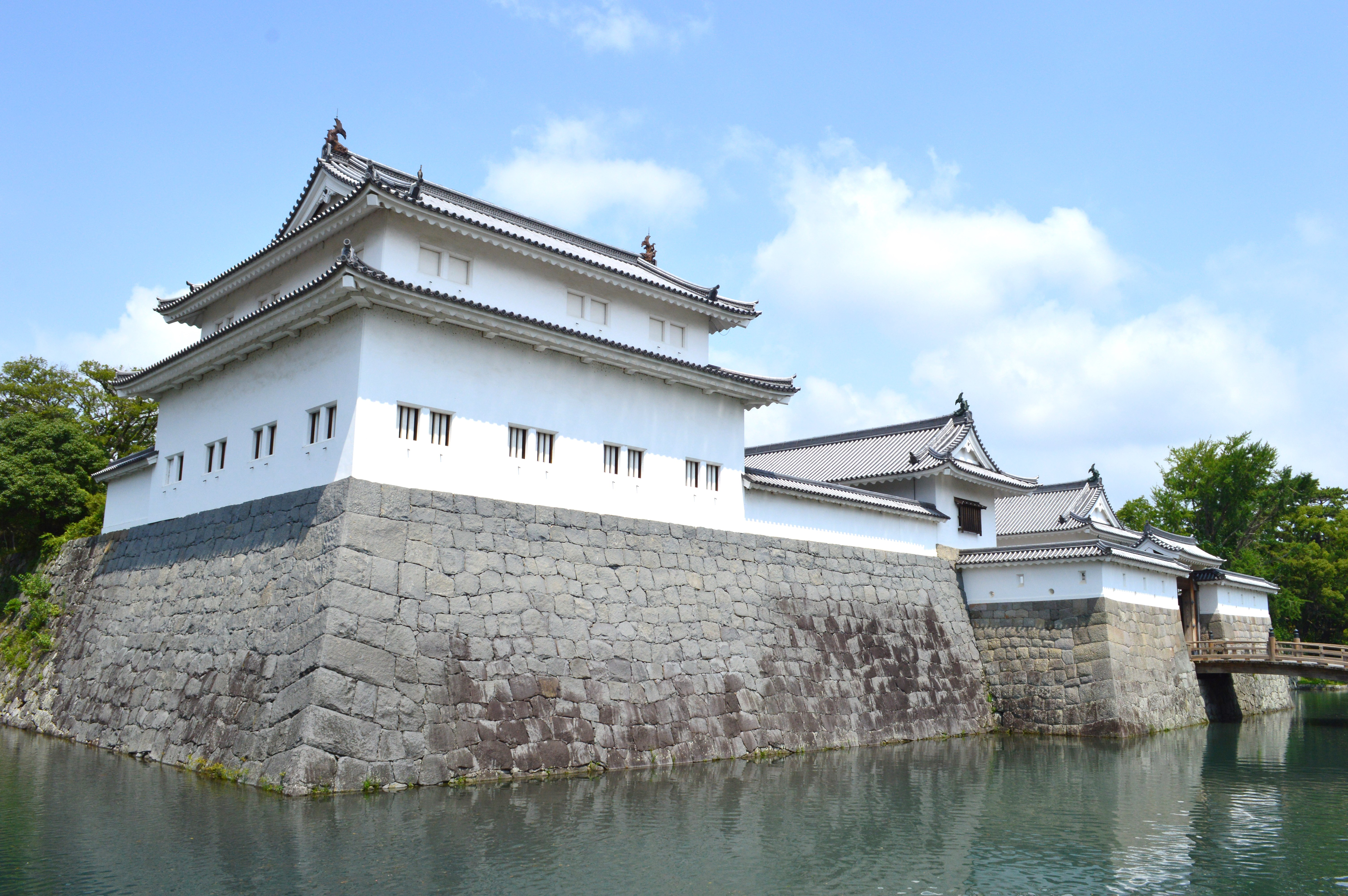
- Reconstructed Tatsumi yagura of Sunpu Castle

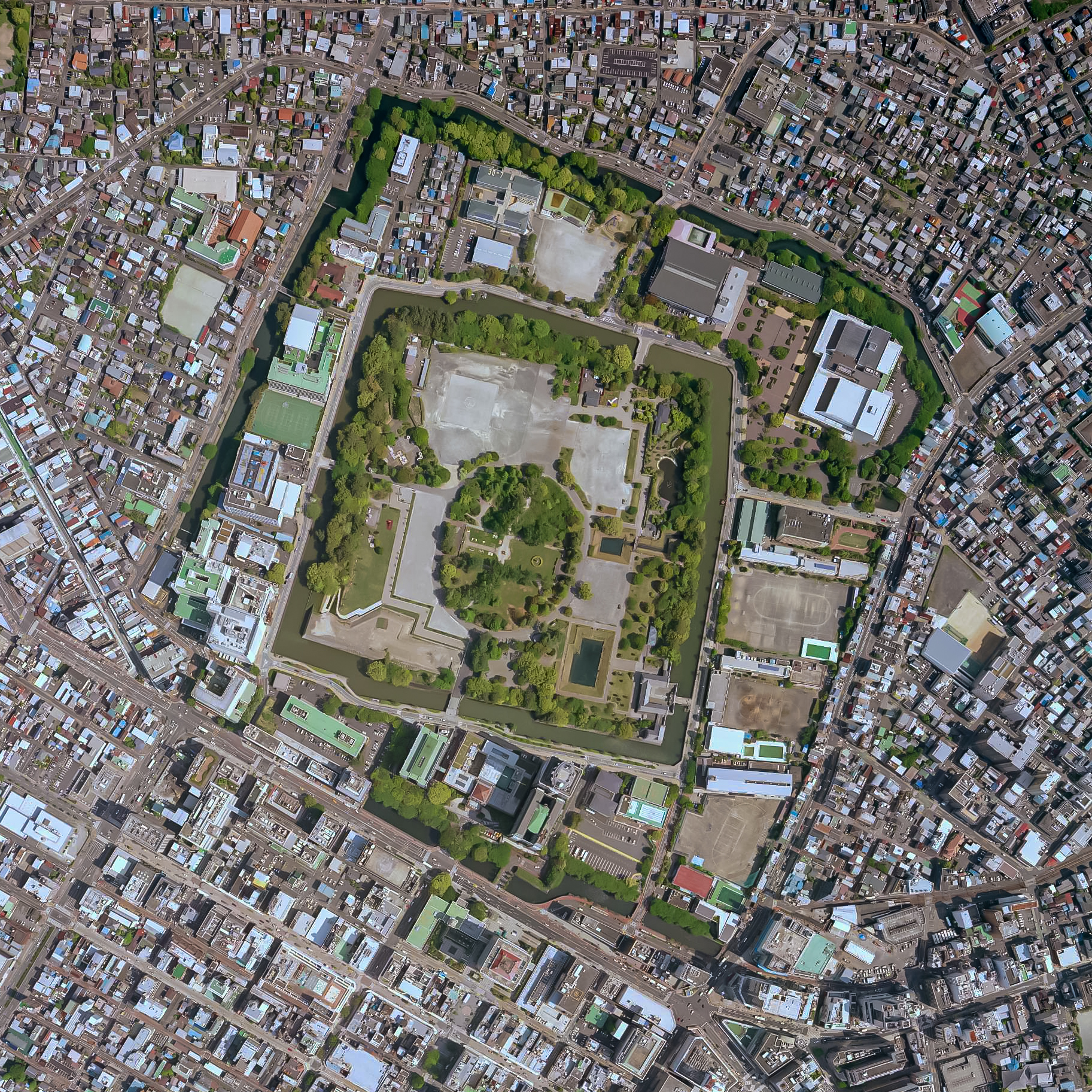
- Sunpu Castle from the air

Site information
- Type: Hirayama-style Japanese castle
- Open to the public: yes
- Condition: ruins

Location
- Coordinates: 34°58′46″N 138°23′01″E

Site history
- Built: 1589, rebuilt 1607, 1610, 1635
- Built by: Tokugawa Ieyasu
- In use: Sengoku period-1889
- Demolished: 1896

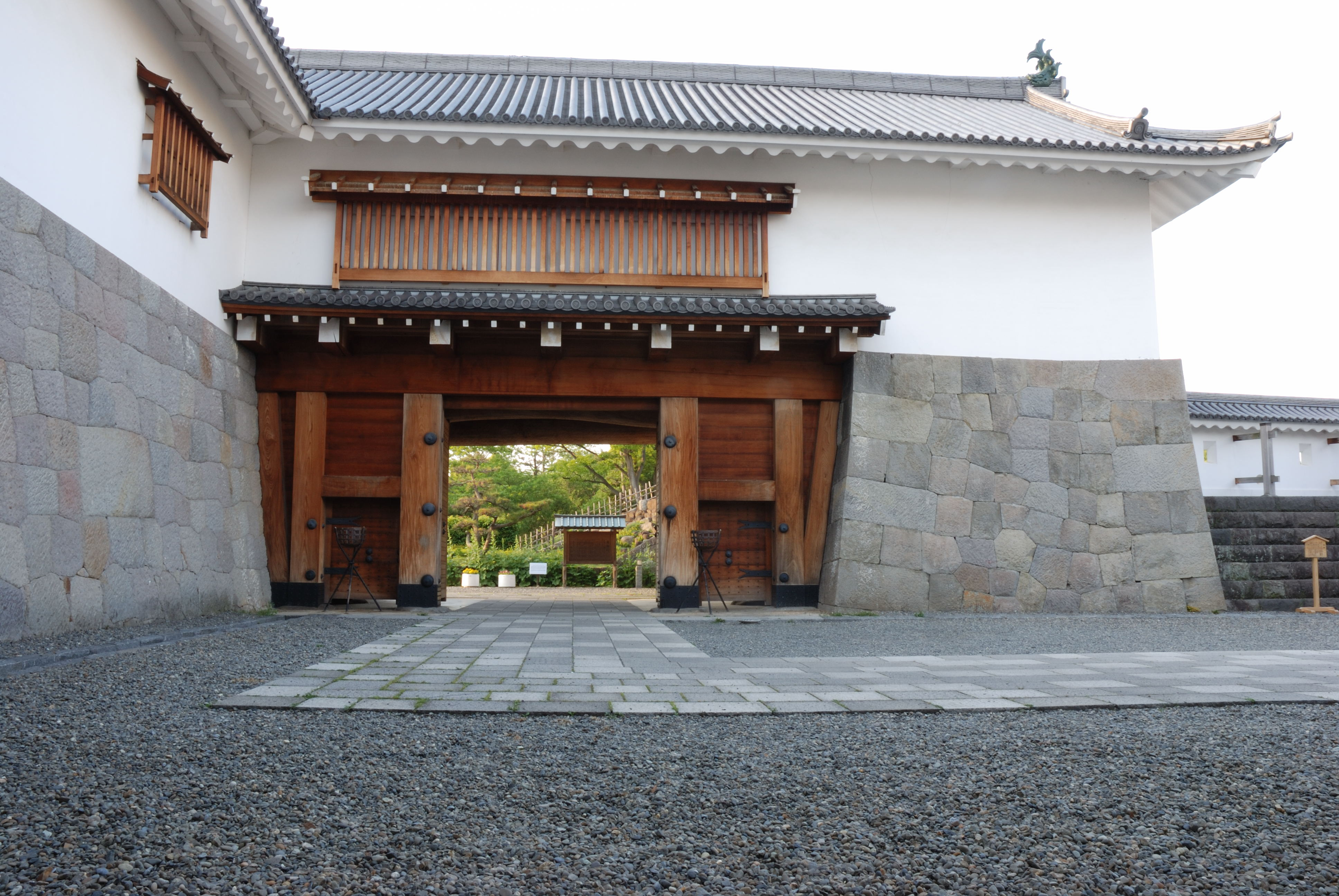
Reconstructed East Gate of Sunpu Castle

Sunpu Castle (駿府城, Sunpu-jō) is a Japanese castle in Shizuoka City, Shizuoka Prefecture in Japan. The sobriquet of this feudal fortress was the "Castle of the Floating Isle". It was also referred to as Fuchu Castle (府中城, Fuchū-jō) or Shizuoka Castle (静岡城, Shizuoka-jō).

== History ==
During the Muromachi period, the Imagawa clan ruled Suruga Province from their base at Sunpu (in modern-day central Shizuoka City). It is not certain exactly when an Imagawa Sunpu castle was built on this site.

=== Tokugawa Ieyasu ===
After Imagawa Yoshimoto was defeated at the Battle of Okehazama in 1560, Suruga Province passed to the Takeda clan, and then to Tokugawa Ieyasu, who had spent his youth in Sunpu as Yoshimoto's hostage.

In 1585, Ieyasu constructed a new Sunpu Castle on the approximate site of the former fortified Imagawa residence. He took up residence at the castle in 1586, along with his favored consort, Lady Saigō, and their two sons, Hidetada and Tadayoshi. Lady Saigo died at Sunpu Castle in 1589. After the defeat of the later Hōjō clan at the Battle of Odawara by Toyotomi Hideyoshi, Ieyasu was forced to change his domains in the Tōkai region with the provinces of the Kantō region, and turned Sunpu Castle over to Toyotomi retainer Nakamura Kazuichi in 1590.

After the defeat of the forces loyal to the heir of Toyotomi at the Battle of Sekigahara, Ieyasu recovered Sunpu. With the formation of the Tokugawa shogunate, Ieyasu turned the title of shōgun over to his son Tokugawa Hidetada, and retired to Sunpu, where he set up a shadow government to maintain effective rule over the country from behind the scenes. As part of the Tokugawa policy to sap potential rivals of economic strength, daimyōs from around the country were called upon to rebuild Sumpu Castle in 1607 with a triple moat system, keep and palace. When this burned down in 1610, the daimyōs were ordered to rebuild it immediately, this time with a seven-story donjon.

The castle was visited by John Saris on the first English trade mission to Japan in 1613. Saris and William Adams met with Ieyasu here to exchange gifts and negotiate terms for the East India Company to trade with Japan.

=== Later Edo period ===
After Ieyasu's death in 1616, Sunpu Castle remained the seat of government for the surrounding Sunpu Domain, which for most of its existence was a tenryō territory governed directly by the shōgun in Edo.

During this period, a series of appointed overseers were based at Sunpu Castle to serve as administrators for the region. These officials were called the Sunpu jōdai (駿府城代) or Sushū Rioban, and were most often appointed from the ranks of the Ōbangashira.

In 1635, most of Sunpu burned down in a fire, which also consumed the buildings of Sunpu Castle. By 1638, the palace, gates, yagura and other structures were reconstructed, but notably, the donjon was not, since Sunpu was ruled by an appointed administrator, rather than by a daimyō.

=== Modern era ===
After the Meiji Restoration, the final Tokugawa shōgun, Tokugawa Yoshinobu, resigned his post and moved to Sunpu in retirement. However, he was not allowed to move into Sunpu Castle, but was given the former Sunpu Daikansho offices to be his residence. His heir, Tokugawa Iesato, was briefly established as daimyō of "Shizuoka Domain" (700,000 koku) in 1868 until its abolition a year later in 1869.

In 1871, American educator E. Warren Clark arrived in Shizuoka to teach science. Shortly thereafter, he directed construction of an American-style house on the grounds of the former castle. In 1873, Clark left Shizuoka for Tokyo. A western-style school, the Shizuhatasha (or Shizuhatanoya) was established in the house which had been built for Clark; and a Canadian missionary, Davidson McDonald, was engaged to run it. McDonald later helped establish Aoyama Gakuin University in Tokyo.

The castle grounds became property of Shizuoka City from 1889. Much of the moat system was filled in, and portions of the bailey either became a park, or were used as for prefectural government offices. In 1896, a large portion of the inner castle grounds was turned over to the Imperial Japanese Army as a base for the IJA 34th Infantry Regiment.

In 1949, the army base was abolished, and the area turned over to the city government, which transformed the area into "Sunpu Park". Reconstruction projects in 1989 and in 1996 recreated the Tatsumi Yagura and eastern gate.

== See also ==
- Sunpu Domain

== Literature ==
- Benesch, Oleg and Ran Zwigenberg (2019). Japan's Castles: Citadels of Modernity in War and Peace. Cambridge: Cambridge University Press. p. 374. ISBN 9781108481946.
- De Lange, William (2021). An Encyclopedia of Japanese Castles. Groningen: Toyo Press. pp. 600 pages. ISBN 978-9492722300.
- Schmorleitz, Morton S. (1974). Castles in Japan. Tokyo: Charles E. Tuttle Co. pp. 127–128. ISBN 0-8048-1102-4.
- Motoo, Hinago (1986). Japanese Castles. Tokyo: Kodansha. p. 200 pages. ISBN 0-87011-766-1.
- Mitchelhill, Jennifer (2004). Castles of the Samurai: Power and Beauty. Tokyo: Kodansha. p. 112 pages. ISBN 4-7700-2954-3.
- Turnbull, Stephen (2003). Japanese Castles 1540–1640. Osprey Publishing. p. 64 pages. ISBN 1-84176-429-9.
