= Suruga Province =

Former province of Japan

Coordinates: 35°07′39″N 138°29′12″E

Map of Japanese provinces (1868) with Suruga Province highlighted

Suruga Province (駿河国, Suruga no Kuni) (Note: Japanese pronunciation: [sɨ́.ɾɯ̈̀.ɡä̀ (nò̞ kɯ̈̀.ɲ̟ì), sɨ́.ɾɯ̈̀.ŋä̀ (nò̞ kɯ̈̀.ɲ̟ì), sɨ̀.ɾɯ̈́.ɡä́ (nò̞ kɯ̈̀.ɲ̟ì), sɨ̀.ɾɯ̈́.ŋä́ (nò̞ kɯ̈̀.ɲ̟ì)]) was an old province in the area that is today the central part of Shizuoka Prefecture. Suruga bordered on Izu, Kai, Sagami, Shinano, and Tōtōmi provinces; and was bordered by the Pacific Ocean through Suruga Bay to the south. Its abbreviated form name was Sunshū (駿州).

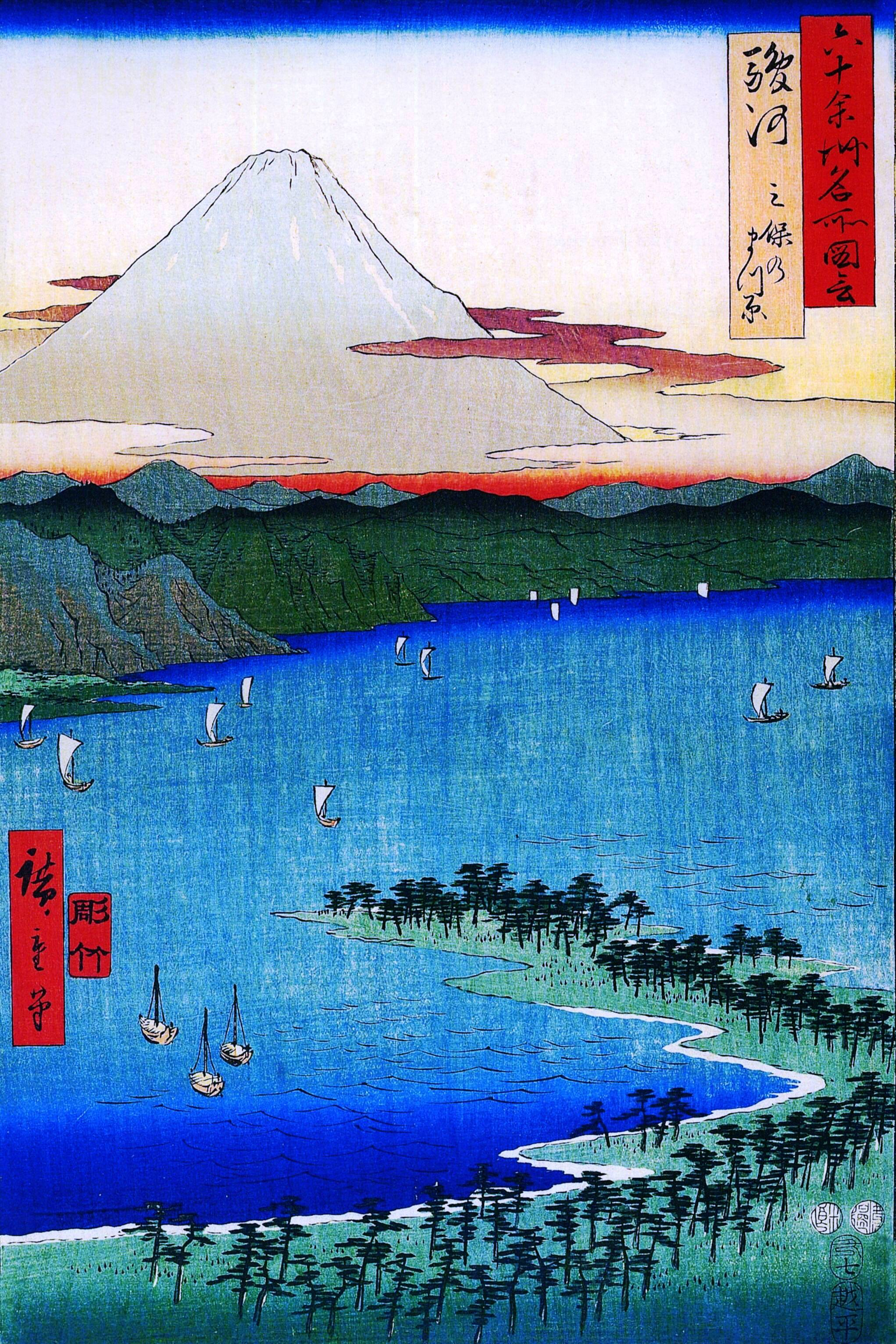
Hiroshige ukiyo-e "Suruga" in "The Famous Scenes of the Sixty States" (六十余州名所図会), depicting the Miho no Matsubara and Mount Fuji

== History ==
=== Early period ===
Suruga was one of the original provinces of Japan established in the Nara period under the Taihō Code. The original capital of the province was located in what is now Numazu, which also had the Kokubun-ji and the Ichinomiya (Mishima Taisha) of the province. Under the Engishiki classification system, Suruga was ranked as a "major country" (上国), and was governed by a Kuni no miyatsuko; under the ritsuryō system, Suruga was classified as a "middle country" (中国).

In a 680 AD cadastral reform, the districts forming Izu Province were administratively separated from Suruga, and the provincial capital was relocated to the right bank of the Abe River in what is now Shizuoka City.

== Medieval period ==
Records of Suruga during the Heian period are sparse, but during the Kamakura period, Suruga was under direct control of the Hōjō clan. With the development of the Kamakura shogunate came increased traffic on the Tōkaidō road connecting Kamakura with Kyoto. The province came under the control of the Imagawa clan from the early Muromachi period through much of the Sengoku period. The Imagawa made efforts to introduce the customs and rituals of the kuge aristocracy to their capital. However, after Imagawa Yoshimoto was defeated by Oda Nobunaga at the Battle of Okehazama, the province taken by Takeda Shingen of Kai. The Takeda were in turn defeated by Tokugawa Ieyasu, who was already master of Mikawa and Tōtōmi.

After the Siege of Odawara (1590), Toyotomi Hideyoshi forced the Tokugawa to exchange their domains for the provinces of the Kantō region, and reassigned Sunpu Castle to one of his retainers, Nakamura Kazuichi. However, after the defeat of Ishida Mitsunari at the Battle of Sekigahara, Tokugawa Ieyasu recovered his former domains, and made Sunpu Castle his home after he formally retired from the position of Shōgun.

=== Early modern period ===
During the Edo period, Suruga prospered due to its location on the Tōkaidō, and numerous post towns developed. For defensive purposes, the Tokugawa shogunate forbade the construction of bridges on the major rivers of Suruga Province (such as at the Ōi River), which further led to town development on the major river crossings.

During this period, the major urban center of Sunpu remained a tenryō territory, administered directly the Shōgun by the Sunpu jōdai, and several smaller feudal domains were assigned to close fudai retainers.

Following the defeat of the Tokugawa shogunate during the Boshin War of the Meiji Restoration, the last Tokugawa shōgun, Tokugawa Yoshinobu returned to Suruga in 1868 to rule the short-lived Shizuoka Domain until the abolition of the han system in 1871 by the new Meiji government.

Suruga was subsequently merged with the neighboring provinces of Tōtōmi and Izu (less the Izu Islands) to form modern Shizuoka Prefecture. At the same time, the province continued to exist for some purposes. For example, Suruga is explicitly recognized in treaties in 1894 (a) between Japan and the United States and (b) between Japan and the United Kingdom.

In the mid-19th century, Suruga was one of the most frequently mapped provinces in Japan.

== Historical districts ==
Suruga Province consisted of seven districts:

- Shizuoka Prefecture
  - Abe District (安倍郡) – absorbed Udo District on April 1, 1896; now dissolved
  - Fuji District (富士郡) – dissolved
  - Ihara District (庵原郡) – dissolved
  - Mashizu District (益津郡) – merged into Shida District on April 1, 1896
  - Shida District (志太郡) – absorbed Mashizu District on April 1, 1896; now dissolved
  - Suntō District (駿東郡)
  - Udo District (有渡郡) – merged into Abe District on April 1, 1896

== Bakumatsu-period domains ==
Bakumatsu-period domains
Name	type	daimyō	kokudaka
Numazu Domain	fudai	Mizuno	50,000 koku
Tanaka Domain	fudai	Honda	40,000 koku
Ojima Domain	fudai	Matsudaira (Takiwaki)	10,000 koku

== Highways ==
- Tōkaidō – connecting Edo with Kyoto

== See also ==
- Shizuoka, Shizuoka
- Sunpu Domain

== Bibliography ==
- Nussbaum, Louis-Frédéric and Käthe Roth. (2005). Japan encyclopedia. Cambridge: Harvard University Press. ISBN 978-0-674-01753-5; OCLC 58053128
- Papinot, Edmond. (1910). Historical and Geographic Dictionary of Japan. Tokyo: Librarie Sansaisha. OCLC 77691250
- (in Japanese) Suruga on "Edo 300 HTML"
