= Sunpu Domain =

Edo period Japanese feudal domain in Suruga province

Shizuoka Domain (1869–1871) 静岡藩 Suruga-Fuchū Domain (1601–1632) 駿河府中藩
- Domain of Japan
- 1601–1606; 1609–1619; 1624–1632; 1868–1871
- Capital: Sunpu Castle
  - Type: Daimyō
- Historical era: Edo period
  - Established: 1601
  - Disestablished: 1871
- Today part of: part of Nagano Prefecture

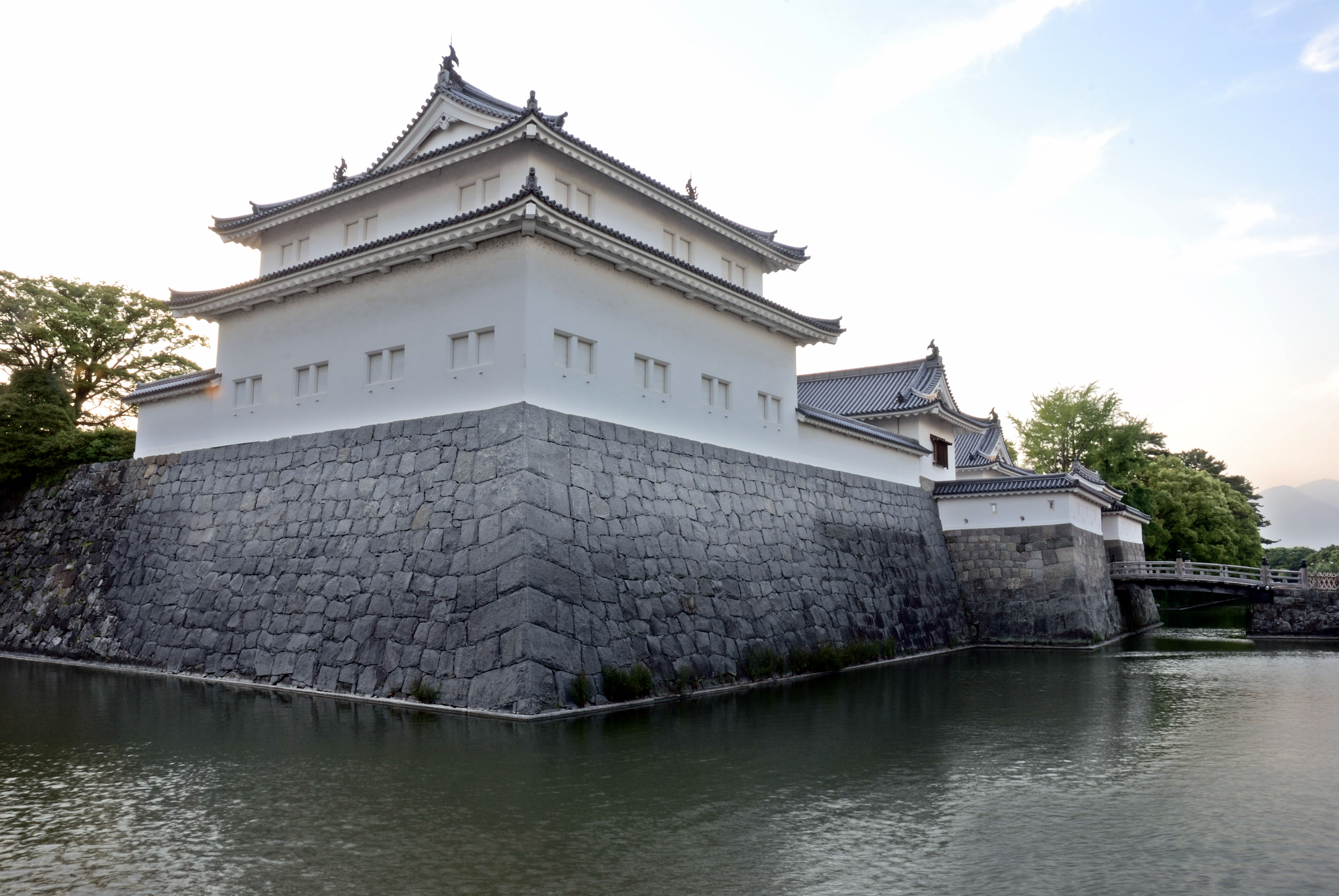
Tatsumi Yagura of Sunpu Castle (reconstruction)

Sunpu Domain (駿府藩, Sunpu-han) was a feudal domain under the Tokugawa shogunate of Edo period Japan. The domain centered at Sunpu Castle is what is now the Aoi-ku, Shizuoka. From 1869 it was briefly called Shizuoka Domain (静岡藩).

== History ==
During the Muromachi period, Sunpu was the capital of the Imagawa clan. The Imagawa were defeated at the Battle of Okehazama, and Sunpu was subsequently ruled by Takeda Shingen, followed by Tokugawa Ieyasu. However, Toyotomi Hideyoshi relocated Ieyasu from his territories in the Tōkai region of Japan, and installed Nakamura Kazutada in his place. After the Toyotomi were defeated in the Battle of Sekigahara, Ieyasu recovered Sunpu and relocated Nakamura to Yonago in Hōki Province. Sunpu was initially reassigned to Naitō Nobunari in 1601. This marked the start of Sunpu Domain.

In April 1606, Ieyasu officially retired from the post of shōgun, and he retired to Sunpu, where he established a secondary court, from which he could influence Shōgun Tokugawa Hidetada from behind the scenes. Naitō was transferred to Nagahama in Ōmi Province.

The Sunpu Domain was briefly re-established in 1609 for Tokugawa Ieyasu's tenth son Tokugawa Yorinobu. It was disbanded in 1619 and reverted to tenryō status (direct administration by the shogunate) when Yorinobu moved to Wakayama to found Wakayama Domain.

In 1624, Sunpu Domain was again established, this time for Tokugawa Hidetada's third son Tokugawa Tadanaga, with assigned revenues of 550,000 koku. However, Tadanaga had very strained relations with his brother, Shōgun Tokugawa Iemitsu. He was removed from office and forced to commit seppuku in December 1632, after which time the Sunpu Domain returned to the direct administration by the shogunate. Through the remainder of the Edo period, Sunpu was ruled by the Sunpu jōdai (駿府城代), an official with hatamoto status, appointed by the central government.

During the Meiji Restoration, the final Tokugawa shōgun, Tokugawa Yoshinobu resigned his office to Emperor Meiji and leadership of the Tokugawa clan to Tokugawa Iesato. In 1868, Iesato was demoted in status to that of an ordinary daimyō, and assigned the newly created Shizuoka Domain, which included all of the former Sunpu Domain, neighboring Tanaka and Ōjima Domains, and additional lands in Tōtōmi and Mutsu Provinces for a total revenue of 700,000 koku. The territories in Mutsu were exchanged for territories in Mikawa Province later that year.

In the Meiji period from 1868 to 1871, the title of the Shizuoka daimyō was han-chiji or chihanji (domainal governor). In 1871, Shizuoka Domain was replaced by Shizuoka Prefecture.

The lands of the former Shizuoka Domain now form the western two-thirds of Shizuoka Prefecture, plus the Chita Peninsula in Aichi Prefecture. At times, the domain included Kai Province and parts of Tōtōmi Province in addition to Suruga Province.

== List of daimyōs ==
#	Name	Tenure	Courtesy title	Court Rank	kokudaka
Naitō clan, 1601–1609 (fudai)
1	Naitō Nobunari (内藤信成)	1601–1606	Bizen-no-kami (備前守)	Lower 5th (従五位下)	40,000 koku
Tokugawa clan, 1609-1868 (shinpan)
x	tenryō	1608–1609			
1	Tokugawa Yorinobu (徳川 頼宣)	1609–1619	Dainagon (大納言)	2nd (従二位)	500,000 koku
x	tenryō	1619–1625			
1	Tokugawa Tadanaga (徳川 忠長)	1625–1634	Dainagon (大納言)	2nd (従二位)	550,000 koku
x	tenryō	1634–1869			
1	Tokugawa Iesato (徳川 家達)	1869–1871	Sangi (参議)	1st (従一位)	700,000 koku

== See also ==
- List of Han
- Yamaoka Tesshū
