= Tanba-Kameyama Domain =

Japanese feudal domain located in Tanba Province

Tanba-Kameyama Domain 丹波亀山藩
- under Tokugawa shogunate Japan
- 1600–1871
- Capital: Kameyama Castle
- Area
  - Coordinates: 35°17′48.5″N 135°7′46.8″E
  - Type: Daimyō
- Historical era: Edo period
  - Established: 1600
  - Disestablished: 1871
- Today part of: part of Kyoto Prefecture

Location of Kameyama Castle
Tanba-Kameyama Domain (Japan)

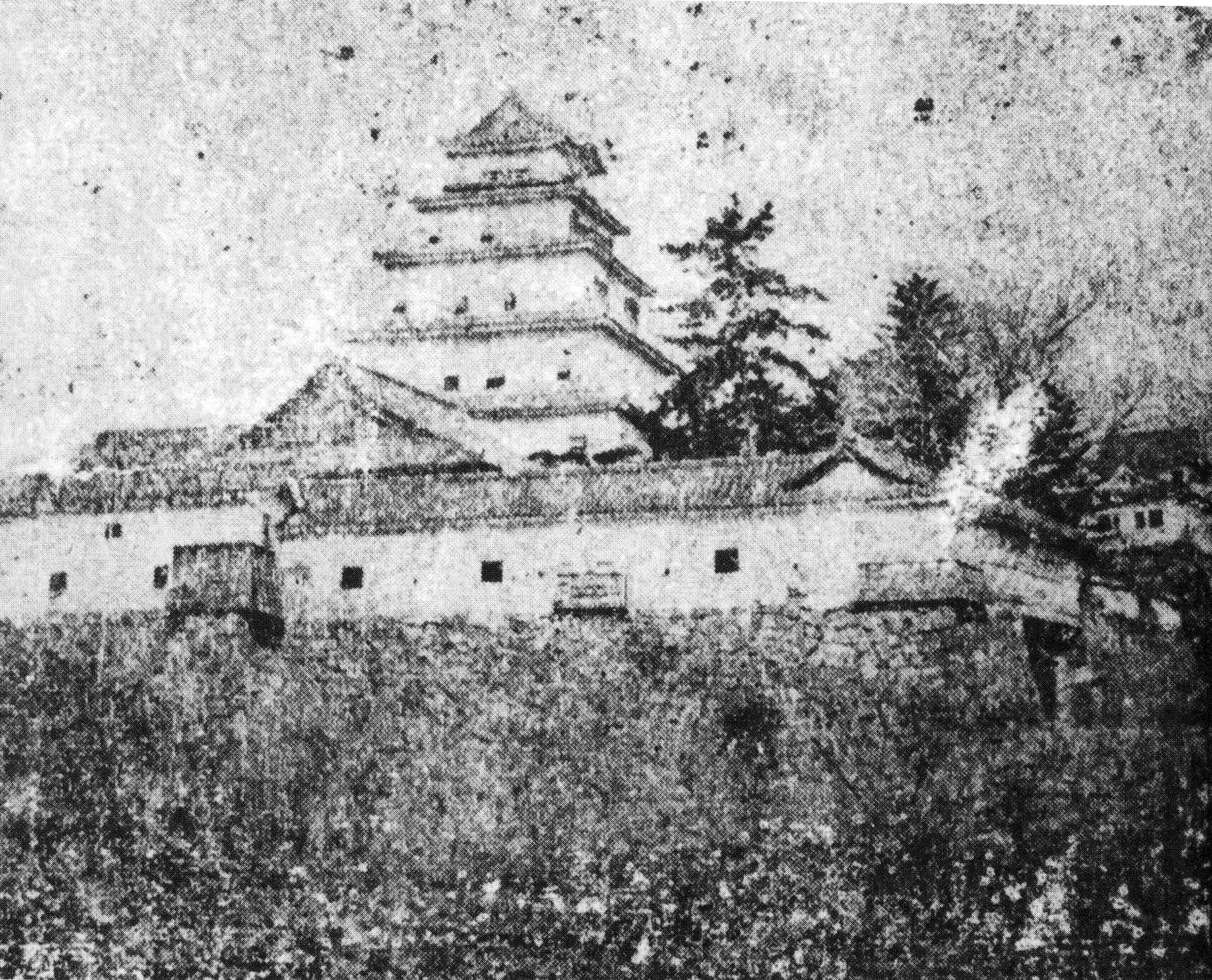
Kameyama Castle in 1872

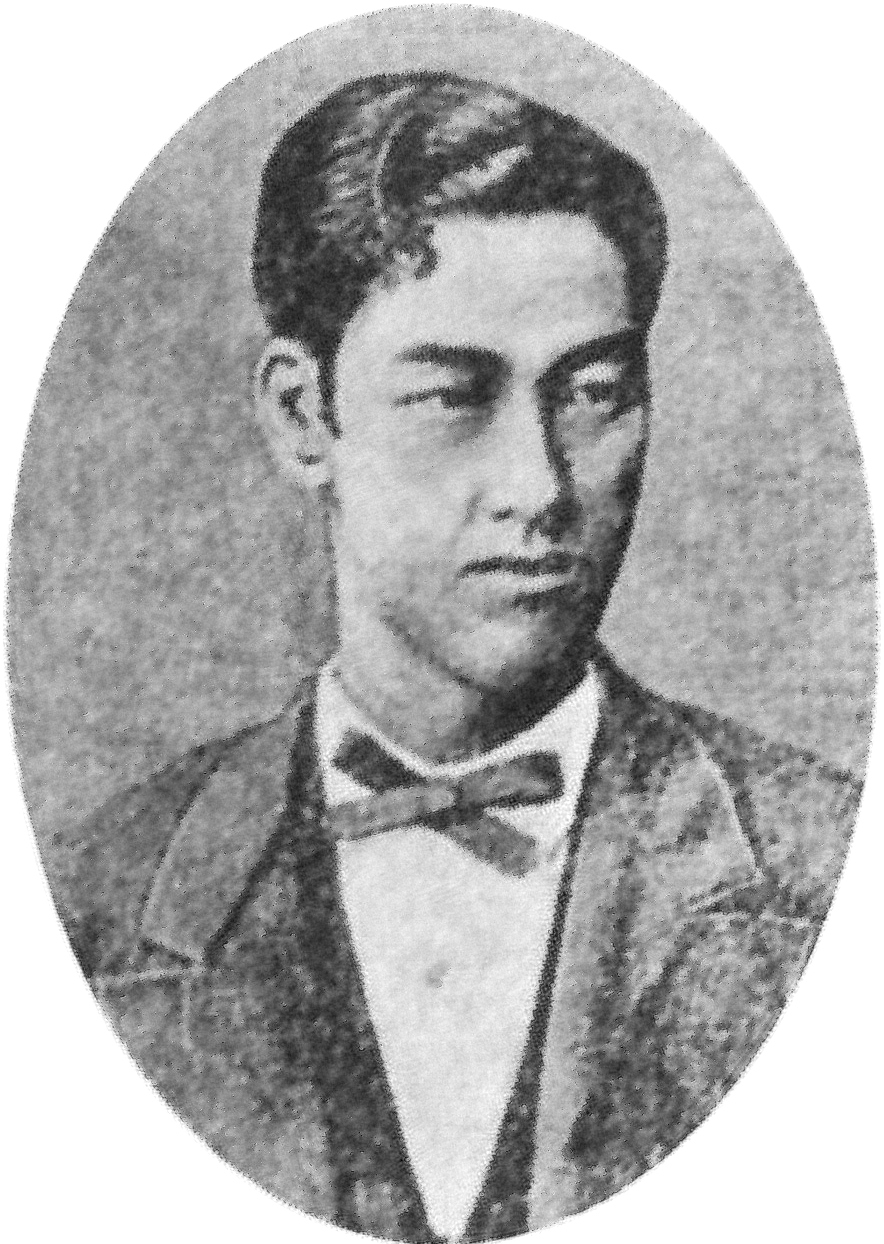
Matsudaira Nobumasa, final daimyō of Tanba-Kameyama

Tanba-Kameyama Domain (丹波亀山藩, Tanba-Kameyama-han) was a feudal domain under the Tokugawa shogunate of Edo period Japan, located in Tanba Province in what is now the west-central portion of modern-day Kyoto Prefecture. It was centered initially around Kameyama Castle in what is now the city of Kameoka, Kyoto. It is referred to as "Tanba-Kameyama Domain" to disambiguate it from Ise-Kameyama Domain.

== History ==
The Kameoka area is located about 20 kilometers to the west of Kyoto, to which it is connected by the Kizugawa River. The area has long been regarded as the western gateway to Kyoto and was of strategic importance in protecting it from approach from both the San'in region and San'yo regions of western Japan. Recognizing the importance of this location, Oda Nobunaga's vassal Akechi Mitsuhide constructed a castle from which he conquered Tanba Province. It was from this castle that he later set out in 1582 to assassinate Nobunaga at the Honnō-ji Incident. After Akechi Mitsuhide's defeat by Toyotomi Hideyoshi, the castle was held by a number of members of the Toyotomi clan or various generals, who changed in rapid succession, including Maeda Gen'i, one of Toyotomi Hideyoshi's Go-Bugyō. Maeda joined the Western army at the Battle of Sekigahara, but although he was on the losing side, Tokugawa Ieyasu confirmed him as daimyō of the 50,000 koku Kameyama Domain under the Tokugawa shogunate. His adopted son, Maeda Shigekatsu was transferred to Yakami Domain in 1609. The domain then passed through a large number of fudai clans in its history, most of whom stayed for only one or two generations.

In 1609, Okabe Nagamori was transferred from Shimōsa Province as a measure against Toyotomi Hideyori in Osaka Castle. The castle town was completed, and Kameyama Castle was rebuilt with the assistance of various western daimyō as a gesture of fealty to the Tokugawa. The Okabe were transferred to Fukuchiyama Domain in 1621. Later that same year, Matsudaira Narishige of the Ogyu-Matsudaira was transferred from Nishio Domain in Mikawa Province. His son, Matsudaira Tadaaki, was transferred to Bungo Province in 1634. The Matsudaira were replaced by Suganuma Sadayoshi of Zeze Domain. On the death of his son Suganuma Sadaakiara without heir in 1647, the domain passed to Matsudaira Sadaharu of the Fujii-Matsudaira, formerly of Kakegawa Domain. The clan ruled to 1686, when they were transferred to Iwatsuki Domain. The domain was then ruled from 1686 to 1697 by Kuze Shigeyuki, formerly of Niwase Domain. After his transfer to Yoshida Domain, Inoue Masamune of Gujō Domain ruled briefly to his transfer to Shimodate Domain in 1702. The Aoyama clan then ruled to 1748, with Aoyama Tadashige coming from Hamamatsu Domain, and his grandson Aoyama Tadatomo going to Sasayama Domain.

Following the Aoyama, the domain came under the rule of the Katanobara-Matsudaira clan, who would continue to rule for the remainder of the Edo Period. This brought a period of political stability to the domain. The 7th daimyō, Matsudaira Nobuyoshi served as Jisha-bugyō, Osaka-jō dai and rōjū during the tumultuous Bakumatsu period, and narrowly escaped assassination for his role as Ii Naosuke's assistant in the Ansei Purge. He was one of the Japanese negotiators in the Anglo-Satsuma War. His successor, Matsudaira Nobumasa reversed the domain's position, and quickly joined the imperial side in the Boshin War. On July 27, 1869, the domain's name was officially changed to "Kameoka Domain" to avoid confusion with Ise-Kameyama Domain. In 1871, with the abolition of the han system, Kameoka briefly became "Kameoka Prefecture", which was merged with Kyoto Prefecture a few months later.

== Holdings at the end of the Edo period ==
As with most domains in the han system, Tanba-Kameyama Domain consisted of several discontinuous territories calculated to provide the assigned kokudaka, based on periodic cadastral surveys and projected agricultural yields.

- Tanba Province
  - 58 villages in Kuwada District
  - 39 villages in Funai District
- Bitchū Province
  - 7 villages in Asakuchi District

== List of daimyō ==
#	Name	Tenure	Courtesy title	Court Rank	kokudaka
Maeda clan, 1600-1602 (tozama)
1	Maeda Gen'i (前田玄以)	1600 – 1602	Minbukyō-hōin (民部卿法印)	-none-	50,000 koku
2	Maeda Shigekatsu (前田茂勝)	1602 – 1602	Shuzen-no-kami (主膳正)	Junior 5th Rank, Lower Grade (従五位下)	50,000 koku
Okabe clan, 1609-1615 (fudai)
1	Okabe Nagamori (部長盛)	1609 – 1615	Naizen-no-kami (内膳正)	Junior 5th Rank, Lower Grade (従五位下)	32,000 koku
Ogyū-Matsudaira clan, 1615-1634 (fudai)
1	Matsudaira Narishige (松平成重)	1615 – 1615	Ukon-no-jō (右近将監)	Junior 5th Rank, Lower Grade (従五位下)	22,000 koku
2	Matsudaira Tadaaki (松平忠昭)	1615 – 1634	Shinano-no-kami (信濃守)	Junior 5th Rank, Lower Grade (従五位下)	22,000 koku
Suganuma clan, 1634-1648 (fudai)
1	Suganuma Sadayoshi (菅沼定芳)	1634 – 1643	Oribe-no-kami (織部正)	Junior 5th Rank, Lower Grade (従五位下)	41,000 koku
2	Suganuma Sadaakira (沼定昭)	1643 – 1648	Sakon-no-jo (左近将監)	Junior 5th Rank, Lower Grade (従五位下)	41,000 koku
Fujii-Matsudaira clan, 1648-1685 (fudai)
1	Matsudaira Tadaharu (松平忠晴)	1648 – 1667	Iga-no-kami (伊賀守)	Junior 5th Rank, Lower Grade (従五位下)	38,000 koku
2	Matsudaira Tadaaki (松平忠昭)	1667 – 1683	Iga-no-kami (伊賀守)	Junior 5th Rank, Lower Grade (従五位下)	38,000 koku
3	Matsudaira Tadachika (松平忠周)	1683 – 1685	Iga-no-kami (伊賀守)	Junior 5th Rank, Lower Grade (従五位下)	38,000 koku
Kuze clan, 1685 -1697 (fudai)
1	Kuze Shigeyuki (久世重之)	1685 – 1697	Yamato-no-kami (大和守); Jijū (侍従)	Junior 4th Rank, Lower Grade (従四位下)	50,000 koku
Inoue clan, 1697 -1702 (fudai)
1	Inoue Masamine (井上正岑)	1697 – 1702	Kawachi-no-kami (河内守); Jijū (侍従)	Junior 4th Rank, Lower Grade (従四位下)	47,000 koku
Aoyama clan, 1702-1749 (fudai)
1	Aoyama Tadashige (青山忠重)	1702 – 1722	Inaba-no-kami (因幡守)	Junior 5th Rank, Lower Grade (従五位下)	50,000 koku
2	Aoyama Toshiharu (青山俊春)	1722 – 1730	Inaba-no-kami (因幡守)	Junior 5th Rank, Lower Grade (従五位下)	50,000 koku
3	Aoyama Tadatomo (青山忠朝)	1730 – 1749	Inaba-no-kami (因幡守)	Junior 5th Rank, Lower Grade (従五位下)	50,000 koku
Katanobara-Matsudaira clan, 1749 -1871 (fudai)
1	Matsudaira Nobumine (松平信岑)	1748 – 1763	Kii-no-kami (紀伊守)	Junior 4th Rank, Lower Grade (従四位下)	50,000 koku
2	Matsudaira Nobunao (松平信直)	1763 – 1781	Kii-no-kami (紀伊守)	Junior 4th Rank, Lower Grade (従四位下)	50,000 koku
3	Matsudaira Nobumichi (松平信道)	1781 – 1791	Kii-no-kami (紀伊守)	Junior 4th Rank, Lower Grade (従四位下)	50,000 koku
4	Matsudaira Nobukata (松平信彰)	1791 – 1802	Kii-no-kami (紀伊守)	Junior 4th Rank, Lower Grade (従四位下)	50,000 koku
5	Matsudaira Nobuzane (松平信志)	1802 – 1816	Kii-no-kami (紀伊守)	Junior 4th Rank, Lower Grade (従四位下)	50,000 koku
6	Matsudaira Nobuhide (松平信豪)	1816 – 1843	Kii-no-kami (紀伊守)	Junior 4th Rank, Lower Grade (従四位下)	50,000 koku
7	Matsudaira Nobuyoshi (松平信義)	1843 – 1866	Kii-no-kami (紀伊守); Jijū (侍従)	Junior 4th Rank, Lower Grade (従四位下)	50,000 koku
8	Matsudaira Nobumasa (松平信正)	1866 – 1871	Zusho-no-kami (図書頭)	Junior 4th Rank, Lower Grade (従四位下)	50,000 koku

== See also ==
- List of Han
- Abolition of the han system
