= Inoue Masaharu =

Japanese daimyō (1805–1847)

Inoue Masaharu 井上正春
- Born: November 25, 1805
- Died: March 28, 1847 (aged 41)
- Other names: Kawachi-no-kami
- Occupation: Daimyō

Inoue Masaharu (井上 正春; November 25, 1805 – March 28, 1847) was a daimyō and official of the Tokugawa shogunate during late-Edo period in Japan. His courtesy title was Kawachi-no-kami.

== Biography ==
Inoue Masaharu was the eldest son of the disgraced former daimyō of Hamamatsu, Inoue Masamoto, who had been demoted to Tanagura Domain in Mutsu Province. He inherited the leadership of the Inoue clan and the position of daimyō of Tanakura Domain on his father's death in 1820.

In 1820, Masaharu was appointed to the office of Sōshaban (Master of Ceremonies), and in 1834 to that of Jisha-bugyō. In 1836, he was transferred to the Tatebayashi Domain (60,000 koku) in the Kōzuke Province. In 1838, he was appointed Osaka-jō dai (Castellan of Osaka), and in 1840, he ascended to the rank of Rōjū (Senior Councilor) in the service of Shōgun Tokugawa Ieyoshi.

In 1845, with the resignation of head Rōjū Mizuno Tadakuni over the failure of the Tenpō Reforms and subsequent exile from the Hamamatsu Domain to the Yamagata Domain in the Dewa Province, Inoue Masaharu was able to achieve the Inoue clan's goal of returning to Hamamatsu after an absence of 28 years. From his years in Tanakura in Mutsu, Masaharu brought back a considerable body of knowledge on cotton production and artisans to build new looms, thus developing a major new industry for Hamamatsu and a source of income for the domain. He died in 1847, only two years after the return of the clan to Hamamatsu, and his grave is at the clan temple of Jōshin-ji in Mukogaoka, Bunkyō, Tokyo

Masaharu was married to a daughter of Abe Masakiyo, daimyō of Fukuyama Domain. He was succeeded by his fourth son, Inoue Masanao. One of his daughters was the formal wife of Mizuno Tadakiyo, the son and heir of Mizuno Tadakuno.

Preceded by Inoue Masamoto	Daimyō of Tanagura; 1820–1836	Succeeded by Matsudaira Yasukata
Preceded by Matsudaira Nariyasu	Daimyō of Tatebayashi; 1836–1845	Succeeded by Akimoto Yukitomo
Preceded by Manabe Akikatsu	61st Castellan of Osaka; 1838–1840	Succeeded by Aoyama Tadanaga
Preceded by Mizuno Tadakiyo	Daimyō of Hamamatsu; 1845–1847	Succeeded by Inoue Masanao
