= Inoue Masamoto =

Japanese daimyō

Inoue Masamoto 井上正甫
- Born: December 24, 1778
- Died: March 11, 1858 (aged 79)
- Other names: Kawachi-no-kami
- Occupation: Daimyō

Inoue Masamoto (井上正甫; December 24, 1778 – March 11, 1858) was a daimyō and official of the Tokugawa shogunate during mid-Edo period Japan.

== Biography ==
Inoue Masamoto was the eldest son of the previous daimyō of Hamamatsu Domain, Inoue Masasada. He became 8th head of the Mikawa-branch of Inoue clan and daimyō of Hamamatsu Domain on his father's death in 1786. He was awarded Lower 5th Court Rank and the courtesy title of Kawachi-no-kami soon afterwards.

In 1802, Masamoto entered the administration of the Tokugawa shogunate as a Sōshaban (Master of Ceremonies) under shōgun Tokugawa Ienari.

In 1816, while hawking in what is now Sendagaya outside of Edo, Masamoto raped a young farm wife. On being discovered by her husband, he drew his sword and cut off the man's arm. He gave retainers orders to silence the couple by kidnapping them and taking them to Hamamatsu, but in a short time the story become known throughout Edo, and Masamoto and his men became an object of ridicule by the townspeople and were shunned by their peers. On December 23 of the same year, Masamoto was relieved of his posts, and was reassigned on September 14, 1817, to Tanagura Domain (60,000 koku), in what is now Fukushima Province. However, claiming illness, he never left Edo and remained in seclusion at his Edo residence until his death in 1858.

Inoue Masamoto was married to a daughter of Sanada Yukihiro, daimyō of Matsushiro Domain in Shinano Province. He also had a daughter of Matsudaira Takehiro (daimyō of Tatebayashi Domain) and a daughter of Oda Nobuchika (daimyō of Takahata Domain) as his concubines. He was succeeded by his eldest son Inoue Masaharu in 1820.

His grave is at the Inoue clan temple of Jōshin-ji in Bunkyō, Tokyo.

Preceded by Inoue Masasada	Daimyō of Hamamatsu; 1786–1817	Succeeded by Mizuno Tadakuni
Preceded by Ogawasara Nagamasa	Daimyō of Tanagura; 1817–1820	Succeeded by Inoue Masaharu
