= Inoue Masatsune =

Japanese daimyō

Inoue Masatsune 井上正経
- Born: 1725
- Died: July 6, 1766 (aged 40–41)
- Other names: Kawachi-no-kami; Yamato-no-kami
- Occupations: Daimyō; Rōjū

Inoue Masatsune (井上 正経; 1725 – July 6, 1766) was a daimyō and official of the Tokugawa shogunate during mid-Edo period Japan.

== Biography ==
Inoue Masatsune was the eldest son of the daimyō of Kasama Domain in Hitachi Province, Inoue Masayuki. He was introduced in a formal audience to the shōgun Tokugawa Yoshimune in 1737, and was confirmed as 6th head of the Mikawa-branch of Inoue clan and as daimyō of Kasama Domain on his father's death the same year. In 1739, he was awarded Lower 5th Court Rank and the courtesy title of Kawachi-no-kami. In 1747, Masatune was transferred to Iwakitaira Domain (37,000 koku), also in Hitachi Province, but this was a significant demotion from the previous 60,000 koku he enjoyed while at Kasama.

In 1752, Masatsune entered the administration of the Tokugawa shogunate as a Sōshaban (Master of Ceremonies), becoming Jisha-bugyō on March 28, 1753, and then Osaka-jō dai from May 7, 1756. Also in 1756, his Court Rank was increased to Lower 4th.

His fortunes continued to rise: in 1758 he received the position of Kyoto Shoshidai, and the same year was transferred to Hamamatsu Domain (60,000 koku) in Tōtōmi Province.

Masatsune became a Rōjū on December 12, 1760, serving Shogun Tokugawa Ieshige to March 13, 1763. Also in 1763, his courtesy title was changed to Yamato-no-kami.

Inoue Masatsune was married to a daughter of Sengoku Masafusa, daimyō of Izushi Domain in Tajima Province. He died in 1766 at the relatively young age of 41 and was succeeded by his second son Inoue Masasada.

Preceded by Inoue Masayuki	Daimyō of Kasama; 1737–1747	Succeeded by Makino Sadamichi
Preceded by Naito Masaki	Daimyō of Iwakitaira; 1747–1758	Succeeded by Ando Nobunari
Preceded by Matsudaira Terutaka	23rd Kyoto Shoshidai; 1758–1760	Succeeded by Abe Masasuke
Preceded by Matsudaira Sukemasa	Daimyō of Hamamatsu; 1758–1766	Succeeded by Inoue Masasada
