= Matsudaira Sukekuni =

Japanese daimyō

Matsudaira Sukekuni 松平資訓
- Born: 1700
- Died: May 9, 1752 (aged 51–52)
- Other names: Sanō Sukekuni; Honjō Sukekuni; Bungō-no-kami
- Occupation: Daimyō

Matsudaira Sukekuni (松平 資訓; 1700 – May 9, 1752) was a hatamoto, and later a daimyō during mid-Edo period Japan.

== Biography ==
Matsudaira Sukekuni was born as Sano Sukekuni, the second son of the hatamoto Sanō Katsuyori. In 1714, he entered into the administration of the Tokugawa shogunate as a minor hatamoto, and received Lower 5th Court Rank. In 1718, he received the courtesy title of Bungō-no-kami.

On the death of his brother-in-law, Matsudaira Suketoshi, the daimyō of Hamamatsu Domain in Tōtōmi Province in 1773, Sukekuni was adopted into the Honjō branch of the Matsudaira clan and inherited the 70,000 koku domain. In 1729, he was transferred to Yoshida Domain in Mikawa Province. In 1741, he became a Sōshaban (Master of Ceremonies) in the administration of Edo Castle. In 1748, his Court Rank was raised to Lower 4th. In 1749, he was appointed Kyoto Shoshidai, at which time he exchanged Yoshida Domain back for Hamamatsu Domain. The same year, his courtesy title was upgraded to Chamberlain. He died in 1752.

Sukekuni was married to a daughter of Arima Yorimoto, the daimyō of Kurume Domain.

Preceded by Matsudaira Suketoshi	Daimyō of Hamamatsu; 1723–1749	Succeeded by Matsudaira Nobutoki
Preceded by Matsudaira Nobutoki	Daimyō of Yoshida; 1729–1749	Succeeded by Matsudaira Nobunao
Preceded by Makino Sadamichi	19th Kyoto Shoshidai; 1749–1752	Succeeded by Sakai Tadamochi
Preceded by Matsudaira Nobunao	Daimyō of Hamamatsu; 1749–1752	Succeeded by Matsudaira Sukemasa
