= Mizuno (surname) =

Mizuno (written: 水野) is a Japanese surname. Notable people with the surname include:

- Awa Mizuno (水野 亜和), pen name of Ken Akamatsu (born 1968), Japanese manga artist
- Eiji Mizuno, Japanese mixed martial artist
- Eita Mizuno (水野 英多), Japanese manga artist and illustrator
- Elina Mizuno (水野 絵梨奈; born 1993), Japanese dancer and actress
- Hideko Mizuno (水野 英子; born 1939), Japanese artist and manga artist
- Hideo Mizuno (水野 英郎; born 1970), Japanese weightlifter
- Hikaru Mizuno (水野 輝; born 1991), Japanese footballer
- Hiroko Mizuno (水野 浩子; born 1974), Japanese professional wrestling personality
- Hiromichi Mizuno (水野 弘道), Japanese financial executive
- John Mizuno (born 1964), American politician
- Junko Mizuno (水野 純子; born 1973), Japanese artist and manga artist
- Katsuhito Mizuno (水野 雄仁; born 1965), Japanese baseball player
- May Mizuno, American politician (surname acquired by marriage)
- Mizuno Katsushige (水野 勝成; 1564–1651), Japanese daimyō
- Mizuno Katsutomo (水野 勝知; 1838–1919), Japanese daimyō
- Ken Mizuno (水野 剣; born 1978), Japanese freestyle skier
- Kenichi Mizuno (水野 賢一; born 1966), Japanese politician
- Koki Mizuno (水野 晃樹; born 1985), Japanese footballer
- Kota Mizuno (水野 宏太; born 1982), Japanese basketball coach
- Kumi Mizuno (水野 久美; born 1937), Japanese actress
- Lili Mizuno (born 2001), American rhythmic gymnast
- Maki Mizuno (水野 真紀; born 1970), Japanese actress
- Marie Mizuno (水野 麻里絵), Japanese voice actress
- Miki Mizuno (水野 美紀; born 1974), Japanese actress
- Mikiko Mizuno (水野 幹子; born 1977), Japanese dancer and choreographer
- Nayuta Mizuno (水野 那由太; born 1983), Japanese motorcycle racer
- Mizuno Nobumoto (水野 信元; died 1576), Japanese daimyō
- Mizuno Rentarō (水野 錬太郎; 1868–1949), Japanese politician and cabinet minister
- Riko Mizuno (born 1932), American art dealer
- Risa Mizuno (水野 理紗; born 1978), Japanese voice actress
- Ryo Mizuno (水野 良; born 1963), Japanese author and game designer
- Ryo Mizuno (motorcyclist) (水野 涼; born 1998), Japanese motorcycle racer
- Saku Mizuno (水野 朔; born 1999), Japanese voice actress
- Shunpei Mizuno (水野 俊平; born 1968), Japanese writer
- Sonoya Mizuno, English actress, model and ballet dancer
- Mizuno Tadaaki (水野 忠光; 1771–1814), Japanese daimyō
- Tadahiko Mizuno (水野 忠彦; born 1945), Japanese chemist
- Mizuno Tadahiro (水野 忠弘; 1856–1905), Japanese daimyō
- Mizuno Tadakiyo (水野 忠精; 1833–1884), Japanese daimyō
- Mizuno Tadakuni (水野 忠邦; 1794–1851), Japanese daimyō
- Mizuno Tadamasa (水野 忠政; 1493–1543), Japanese samurai
- Mizuno Tadanori (水野 忠敬; 1851–1907), Japanese daimyō
- Mizuno Tadashige (水野 忠重; 1541–1600), Japanese samurai
- Mizuno Tadatomo (水野 忠友; 1731–1802), Japanese samurai
- Mizuno Tadayuki (水野 忠之; 1669–1731), Japanese daimyō
- Taisuke Mizuno (水野 泰輔; born 1993), Japanese footballer
- Takashi Mizuno (水野 隆; born 1931), Japanese footballer
- Tatsuya Mizuno (水野 竜也; born 1981), Japanese mixed martial artist
- Tohko Mizuno (水野 十子), Japanese manga artist
- Yoshikane Mizuno (水野 義兼; born 1954), Japanese astronomer
- Yui Mizuno (水野 由結; born 1999), Japanese idol, model, and singer
- Yukari Mizuno (水野 友加里; born 1986), Japanese actress
- Yuko Mizuno (水野 裕子; born 1982), Japanese television personality and actress

== Fictional characters ==
- Ai Mizuno (水野 愛), a character in the anime series Zombie Land Saga
- Ami Mizuno (水野 亜美) (also known as "Amy Mizuno" or "Amy Anderson"), a character in the manga series Sailor Moon
- Haruka Mizuno (水野 遥), a character in the manga series Tokyo Daigaku Monogatari
- Kanta Mizuno (水野 灌太), a character in the manga series Desert Punk
- Katsuo Mizuno (水野 カツオ), a character in the manga series The Prince of Tennis
- Suzy Mizuno (Suzume Mizuno (水野 鈴芽)), a character in the manga series Zatch Bell!
- Tomomi Mizuno (水野 友美), a character in the eroge Dōkyūsei 2
