= Inoue Masanao =

Japanese daimyō (1837–1904)

Inoue Masanao 井上正直
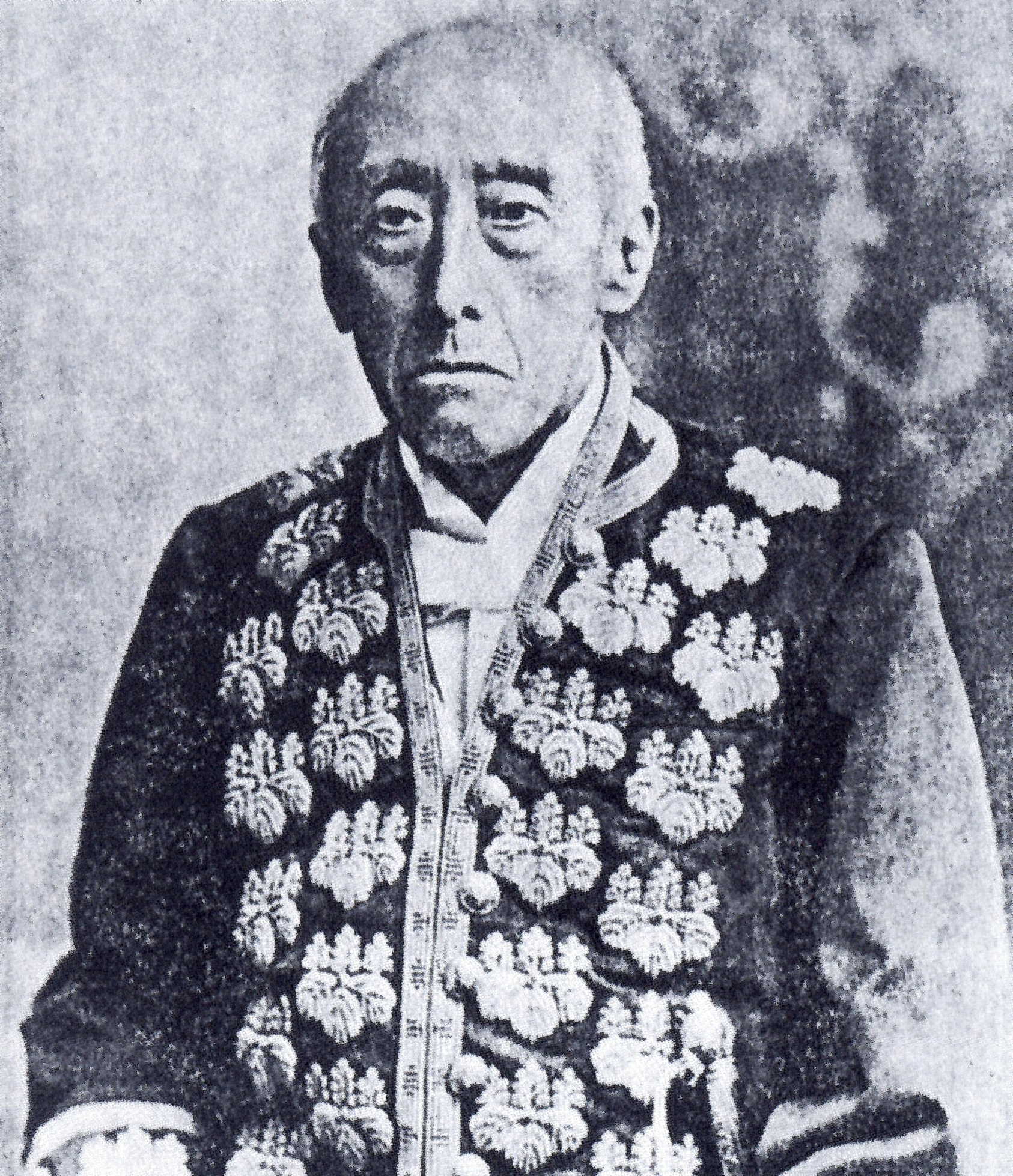
- Born: November 26, 1837
- Died: March 9, 1904 (aged 66)
- Other names: Kawachi-no-kami
- Occupation: Daimyō

Inoue Masanao (井上 正直; November 26, 1837 – March 9, 1904) was a daimyō and official of the Tokugawa shogunate during Bakumatsu period Japan.

== Biography ==
Inoue Masanao was the fourth son of the daimyō of Tatebayashi Domain, Inoue Masaharu, and was born before his father was transferred to Hamamatsu. He inherited the leadership of the Inoue clan and the position of daimyō of Hamamatsu Domain on his father’s death in 1847. In 1851, he was awarded Lower 5th Court Rank and the courtesy title of Kawachi-no-kami.

During the Bakumatsu period, he entered the administration of the Tokugawa shogunate, first as Sōshaban (Master of Ceremonies) in 1858, as Jisha-bugyō in 1861, then as Rōjū (Senior Councilor) in 1862 under Shōgun Tokugawa Ienari. His court rank was correspondingly increased to Lower 4th. In 1863–1864 he participated in the discussions within Edo Castle on the ending of Japan’s national isolation policy and the signing of the unequal treaties with the western powers. Dismissed as Rōjū on July 12, 1864, he was reappointed again on November 26, 1865. In 1866, he participated in the Second Chōshū expedition by the command of the shogunal deputy in Kyoto, Tokugawa Yoshinobu. He resigned again on June 17, 1867.

In 1868, despite his background as a fudai daimyō and former Rōjū, he sided with the Imperial forces in the Boshin War of the Meiji Restoration. In May 1868, Shōgun Tokugawa Yoshinobu was forced to resign his office, and the Tokugawa clan under the new leadership of Tokugawa Iesada was given the provinces of Suruga, Tōtōmi and a portion of Mikawa Province as compensation. The Inoue clan was reassigned to a new 60,000 koku domain in Kazusa Province called Tsurumai Domain in September of the same year. In 1869, Inoue Masaharu became domain governor of Tsurumai Domain under the Meiji government. The domain was abolished in 1871 with the abolition of the han system. After the establishment of the kazoku peerage system, he became a viscount (shishaku). He later became a student of C. Carrothers at the Keio Gijuku in Tokyo.

Inoue Masaharu was married to a daughter of Matsudaira Tadakata, daimyō of Ueda Domain. He was succeeded as head of the Inoue clan by his fourth son Inoue Masanao. His grave is at the Somei Cemetery in Toshima, Tokyo.

Preceded by Inoue Tadaharu	Daimyō of Hamamatsu; 1847–1868	Succeeded by none
Preceded by none	Daimyō of Tsurumai; 1868–1871	Succeeded by none
