= Mizuno (disambiguation) =

Mizuno is a Japanese sportswear and sports equipment manufacturer.

Mizuno may also refer to:

- Mizuno (surname)
- 4541 Mizuno, a minor-planet moon named after Yoshikane Mizuno
