= Tatebayashi Domain =

Japanese administrative area of the Edo period

Tatebayashi Domain 館林藩
- under Tokugawa shogunate Japan
- 1590–1871
- Capital: Tatebayashi Castle
  - Type: Daimyō
- Historical era: Edo period
  - Established: 1590
  - Disestablished: 1871
- Today part of: part of Gunma Prefecture

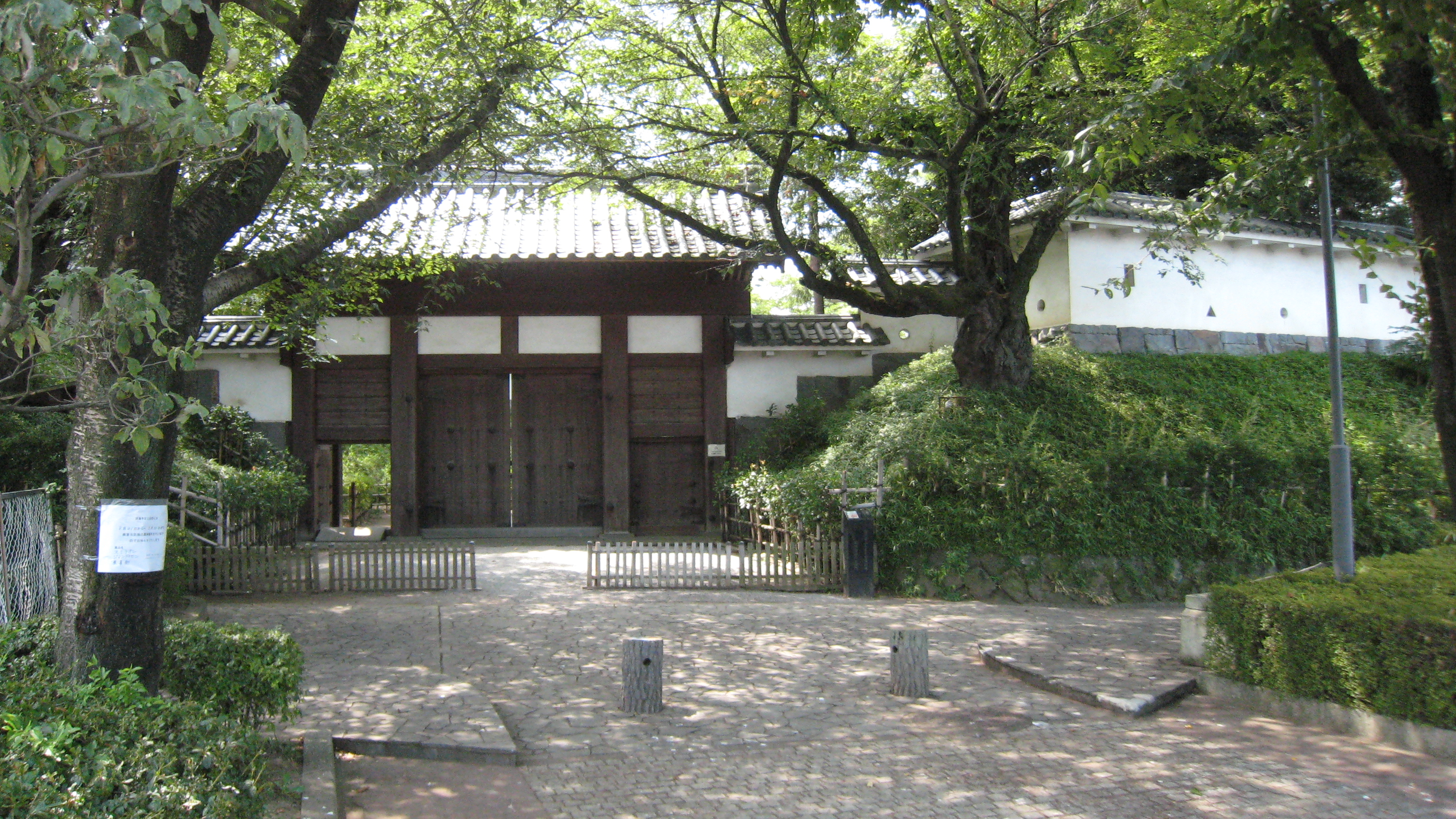
Remaining gate of Tatebayashi Castle, administrative center of Tatebayashi Domain

Tatebayashi Domain (館林藩, Tatebayashi-han) was a feudal domain under the Tokugawa shogunate of Edo period Japan, located in Kōzuke Province (modern-day Gunma Prefecture), Japan. It was centered on Tatebayashi Castle in what is now the city of Tatebayashi, Gunma.

== History ==
Following the Battle of Odawara in 1590, Toyotomi Hideyoshi assigned the Kantō region to Tokugawa Ieyasu, who confirmed Sakakibara Yasumasa, one of this Four Generals as daimyō of Tatebayashi, with revenues of 100,000 koku. Yasumasa built Tatebayashi Castle and the surrounding castle town, as well as constructing waterworks protecting the new town from flooding. His son Sakakibara Yatsukatsu participated in the Siege of Osaka, and his nephew and heir Sakakibara Tadatsugu received permission to use the Matsudaira surname and an increase in revenues to 110,000 koku in 1625. He was transferred to Shirakawa Domain in Mutsu Province in 1643.

Tatebayashi Domain was then assigned to Matsudaira Norinaga, who served as rōjū under Shōgun Tokugawa Iemitsu with revenues set at 60,000 koku. However, when his son, Matsudaira Norihisa took over the domain in 1654, he set aside 5,000 koku for his younger brother Norimasa. He was transferred to Sakura Domain in Shimōsa Province in 1661.

The domain was then given to the younger brother of Shōgun Tokugawa Ietsuna, the future Shōgun Tokugawa Tsunayoshi with revenues increased to 250,000 koku. However, Tsunayoshi never actually set foot in Tatebayashi, preferring to remain in Edo. After he became Shōgun in 1680, he assigned Tatebayashi to his infant son, Tokugawa Tokumatsu. When Tokumatsu died in 1683, Tatebayashi Castle was allowed to fall to ruin and the domain was abolished.

The domain was revived in 1707 for the grandson of Shōgun Tokugawa Iemitsu, Matsudaira Kiyotake, who was allotted only 24,000 koku. He received an increase to 34,000 koku in 1710 and to 54,000 koku in 1712. His grandson Matsudaira Takechika was transferred to Tanakura Domain in Mutsu in 1728. He was replaced at Tatebayashi by the wakadoshiyori Ōta Sukeharu who remained until appointed Osaka-jō dai in 1734. Tatebayashi remained vacant in 1740, when Sukeharu's son Ōta Suketoshi was finally appointed daimyo. He was transferred to Kakegawa Domain in Tōtōmi Province in 1746 and Matsudaira Takechika (now a rōjū) returned from Tanakura. In December 1769, his holdings were increased to 61,000 koku. His grandson Matsudaira Nariyasu was transferred to Hamada Domain in Iwami Province in 1836.Inoue Masaharu was then transferred from Tanakura to Tatebayashi, and his revenues were set at 60,000 koku. In 1845 he was sent to Hamamatsu Domain.

In 1845, Akimoto Yukitomo was transferred from Yamagata Domain to Tatebayashi. He was, along with Tokugawa Nariaki of Mito Domain, a strong supporter of the sonnō jōi movement. However, he opposed the actions of Chōshū Domain, and retired after receiving word of the Kinmon Incident. The domain attempted to remain neutral in the Boshin War, but after paying a fine of 20,000 ryō to the new Meiji government, was allowed to send its forces to participate in the campaign in the northern Japan against the remaining pro-Tokugawa forces of the Ōuetsu Reppan Dōmei, for which it received an increase in revenues to 70,000 koku.

After the end of the conflict, with the abolition of the han system in July 1871, Tatebayashi Domain became “Tatebayashi Prefecture”, which later became part of Gunma Prefecture.

The domain had a population of 75,057 people in 15,868 households per a census in 1869.

== Holdings at the end of the Edo period ==
As with most domains in the han system, Tatebayashi Domain consisted of several discontinuous territories calculated to provide the assigned kokudaka, based on periodic cadastral surveys and projected agricultural yields.

- Dewa Province
  - 39 villages in Murayama District
- Kōzuke Province
  - 1 village in Nitta District
  - 43 villages in Ōra District
- Shimotsuke Province
  - 3 villages in Tsuga District
  - 1 villages in Aso District
- Kawachi Province
  - 10 villages in Tannan District
  - 16 villages in Tanboku District
  - 11 villages in Yakami District

== List of daimyō ==
#	Name	Tenure	Courtesy title	Court Rank	kokudaka
Sakakibara clan (fudai) 1590–1643
1	Sakakibara Yasumasa (榊原康政)	1590–1606	Shikibu-taifu (式部大輔)	Lower 4th (従四位下)	100,000 koku
2	Sakakibara Yasukatsu (榊原康勝)	1606–1615	Tōtōmi-no-kami (遠江守)	Lower 5th (従五位下)	100,000 koku
3	Sakakibara Tadatsugu (榊原忠次)	1615–1643	Shikibu-taifu (式部大輔), Jiju (侍従)	Lower 4th (従四位下)	100,000 ->110,000 koku
Ogyu-Matsudaira clan (fudai) 1644–1661
1	Matsudaira Norinaga (松平乗寿)	1644–1654	Izumi-no-kami (和泉守)	Lower 5th (従五位下)	60,000 koku
2	Matsudaira Norihisa (松平乗久)	1654–1661	Izumi-no-kami (和泉守)	Lower 5th (従五位下)	60,000-->55,000 koku
Tokugawa clan (shinpan) 1644–1683
1	Tokugawa Tsunayoshi (徳川綱吉)	1661–1680	Sangi (参議)	3rd (正三位)	250,000 koku
2	Tokugawa Tokumatsu (徳川徳松)	1680–1683	-none-	-none-	250,000 koku
	tenryō	1683–1707			
Matsudaira clan (shinpan) 1707–1728
1	Matsudaira Kiyotake (松平清武)	1707–1724	Ukon-no-jō (右近将監)	Lower 4th (従四位下)	24,000 ->34,000 ->54,000 koku
2	Matsudaira Takemasa (松平武雅)	1724–1728	Higo-no-kami (肥後守)	Lower 5th (従五位下)	54,000 koku
3	Matsudaira Takechika (松平武元)	1728–1728	Ukon-no-jō (右近将監), Jiju (侍従)	Lower 4th (従五位下)	54,000 koku
Ōta clan (fudai) 1728–1734
1	Ōta Sukeharu (太田資晴)	1728–1734	Bitchu-no-kami (備中守)	Lower 4th (従四位下)	50,000 koku
	tenryō	1734–1740			
Ōta clan (fudai) 1740–1746
1	Ōta Suketoshi (太田資俊)	1740–1746	Settsu-no-kami (摂津守)	Lower 5th (従五位下)	50,000 koku
Matsudaira clan (shinpan) 1746–1728
1	Matsudaira Takechika (松平武元)	1746–1779	Ukon-no-jō (右近将監)	Lower 4th (従四位下)	54,000 ->61,000 koku
2	Matsudaira Takemasa (松平武寛)	1779–1784	Ukon-no-jō (右近将監)	Lower 5th (従五位下)	61,000 koku
3	Matsudaira Nariyasu (松平斉厚)	1784–1836	Ukon-no-jō (右近将監)	Upper 4th (従四位上)	61,000 koku
Inoue clan (fudai) 1836–1845
1	Inoue Masaharu (井上正春)	1836–1845	Kawachi-no-kami (河内守); Jijū (侍従)	Lower 4th (従四位下)	60,000 koku
Akimoto clan (fudai) 1845–1871
1	Akimoto Yukitomo (秋元志朝)	1845–1864	Tajima-no-kami (但馬守)	Lower 4th (従四位下)	60,000 koku
2	Akimoto Hirotomo (秋元礼朝)	1864–1871	Tajima-no-kami (但馬守)	Lower 5th (従五位下)	60,000->70,000 koku
