= Masasada =

- Gender: Male

Origin
- Origin: Japanese
- Meaning: Different meanings depending on the kanji used

Masasada (written: 正定 or 正貞) is a masculine Japanese given name. Notable people with the name include:

- Hoshina Masasada (保科 正貞; 1588–1661), Japanese daimyō
- Inoue Masasada (井上 正定; 1754–1786), Japanese daimyō
