= Munetoshi =

- Gender: Male

Origin
- Origin: Japanese
- Meaning: Different meanings depending on the kanji used

Munetoshi (written: 宗厳 or 宗俊) is a masculine Japanese given name. Notable people with the name include:

- Aoyama Munetoshi (青山 宗俊) (1604–1679), Japanese daimyō
- Yagyū Munetoshi (柳生 宗厳) (1529–1606), Japanese samurai
