= Inoue Masasada =

Japanese daimyō

Inoue Masada 井上正定
- Born: 1754
- Died: April 18, 1786 (aged 31–32)
- Other names: Kawachi-no-kami
- Occupation: Daimyō

Inoue Masasada (井上正定; 1754 – April 18, 1786) was a daimyō and official of the Tokugawa shogunate during mid-Edo period Japan.

== Biography ==
Inoue Masasada was the second son of the previous daimyō of Hamamatsu Domain, Inoue Masatsune. He became 7th head of the Mikawa-branch of Inoue clan and daimyō of Hamamatsu Domain on his father's death in 1766. In 1769, he was awarded Lower 5th Court Rank and the courtesy title of Kawachi-no-kami.

In 1774, Masasada entered the administration of the Tokugawa shogunate as a Sōshaban (Master of Ceremonies), becoming Jisha-bugyō on May 11, 1781.

Inoue Masasada was married to a daughter of Matsudaira Norisuke, daimyō of Yamagata Domain, but had three other concubines. He died in 1786 at the relatively young age of 33 and was succeeded by his eldest son Inoue Masamoto.

Preceded by Inoue Masatsune	Daimyō of Hamamatsu; 1766–1786	Succeeded by Inoue Masamoto
