= Suketsugu =

- Gender: Male

Origin
- Origin: Japanese
- Meaning: Different meanings depending on the kanji used

Suketsugu (written: 輔嗣 or 資次) is a masculine Japanese given name. Notable people with the name include:

- Kujō Suketsugu (九条 輔嗣) (1784–1807), Japanese kuge
- Ōta Suketsugu (太田 資次) (1630–1685), Japanese daimyō
