= Ōta Suketsugu =

Japanese daimyō

Ōta Suketsugu 太田資次
- Born: January 13, 1630
- Died: May 20, 1685 (aged 55)
- Other names: Settsu-no-kami
- Occupation: Daimyō

Ōta Suketsugu (太田資次; January 13, 1630 – May 20, 1685) was a daimyō during early-Edo period Japan. His courtesy title was Settsu-no-kami.

== Biography ==
Ōta Suketsugu was the second son of Ōta Sukemune, the daimyō of Hamamatsu Domain. His elder brother Ōta Sukemasa entered the service of Shōgun Tokugawa Iemitsu at an early age, but was disinherited in 1651 by order of Iemitsu. Sukesugu was confirmed as head of the Ōta clan on his father's retirement in 1671. On December 18, 1671, he became daimyō of Hamamatsu. He entered the administration of the Tokugawa shogunate under Shōgun Tokugawa Ietsugu in 1673 as a Sōshaban (Master of Ceremonies) at Edo Castle and on July 26, 1676, he was appointed a Jisha-bugyō (Commissioner of Shrine and Temples). On June 19, 1678, he received the post of Osaka-jō dai (Castellan of Osaka). In order to take up his posting to Osaka, he surrendered Hamamatsu Domain back to the shogunate, in exchange for 20,000 koku of additional territories scattered in Settsu, Kawachi and Shimōsa provinces.

Suketsugu was married to a daughter of Honda Tadatoshi, daimyō of Okazaki Domain. His son, Ōta Sukenao, later became daimyō of Tanaka Domain in Suruga Province.

Preceded by Ōta Sukemune	Daimyō of Hamamatsu; 1671–1678	Succeeded by Aoyama Munetoshi
Preceded by Aoyama Munetoshi	14th Castellan of Osaka; 1671–1678	Succeeded by Mizuno Tadaharu
