= Matsudaira Sukemasa =

Japanese daimyō

Matsudaira Sukemasa 松平資昌
- Born: November 3, 1744; Yoshida, Mikawa Province, Japan
- Died: February 11, 1762 (aged 42); Miyazu, Tango Province, Japan
- Other names: Iyo-no-kami
- Occupation: Daimyō

Matsudaira Sukemasa (松平資昌; November 3, 1744 – February 11, 1762) was a daimyō during mid-Edo period Japan.

== Biography ==
Matsudaira Sukemasa was the third son of Matsudaira Sukekuni, the daimyō of Yoshida Domain in Mikawa Province. On the death of his father in 1752, he became daimyō of Hamamatsu Domain and head of the Okōchi-branch of the Matsudaira clan at the age of eight.

On December 27, 1758, he was transferred to Miyazu Domain in Tango Province, but owing to his poor health, was unable to exercise administration. On November 27, 1761, he retired from public life, turning the domain over to his adopted son Matsudaira Suketada.

Sukemasa died two months later at the age of 17.

Preceded by Matsudaira Sukekuni	Daimyō of Hamamatsu; 1752–1758	Succeeded by Inoue Masatsune
Preceded by Aoyama Yoshimichi	Daimyō of Miyazu; 1758–1761	Succeeded by Matsudaira Nobuuya
