= Nobunao =

- Gender: Male

Origin
- Origin: Japanese
- Meaning: Different meanings depending on the kanji used

Nobunao (written: 信直 or 信復) is a masculine Japanese given name. Notable people with the name include:

- Matsudaira Nobunao (松平 信復) (1719–1768), Japanese daimyō
- Nanbu Nobunao (南部 信直) (1546–1599), Japanese daimyō
