= Matsudaira Nobutoki =

Japanese daimyō

Matsudaira Nobutoki 松平信祝
- Born: December 23, 1683
- Died: May 29, 1744 (aged 60)
- Other names: Matsudaira Nobutaka; Kai-no-kami, Izu-no-kami,
- Occupations: Daimyō; Rōjū

Matsudaira Nobutoki (松平 信祝; December 23, 1683 – May 29, 1744) was a daimyō during mid-Edo period Japan.

== Biography ==
Matsudaira Nobutoki was the eldest son of Matsudaira Nobuteru, the daimyō of Koga Domain in Shimōsa Province. He was given the adult name of Nobutaka in 1694, and did not change his name to Nobutoki until 1719.

On December 18, 1697, he was granted Lower 5th Court Rank and the courtesy title of Kai-no-kami. On the death of his father on June 18, 1709, he became daimyō of Koga Domain and head of the Ōkōchi-branch of the Matsudaira clan. A few days later, his courtesy title changed to Izu-no-kami. On July 12, 1712, he was transferred to Yoshida Domain in Mikawa Province, with a rise in revenues to 70,000 koku.

On February 2, 1729, he was appointed Osaka-jō dai and his Court Rank was increased to Lower 4th. On February 15, 1729, he was transferred to Hamamatsu Domain in Tōtōmi Province. On July 11, 1730, he was elevated to the rank of Rōjū in the service of Shōgun Tokugawa Yoshimune. His courtesy title was also upgraded to Chamberlain.

Matsudaira Nobutoki was married to a daughter of Sakai Tadataka, the daimyō of Maebashi Domain.

Preceded by Matsudaira Nobuteru	Daimyō of Koga; 1709–1712	Succeeded by Honda Tadanaga
Preceded by Makino Narinaka	Daimyō of Yoshida; 1712–1729	Succeeded by Matsudaira Sukekuni
Preceded by Hotta Masatora	25th Castellan of Osaka; 1729–1730	Succeeded by Toki Yoritoshi
Preceded by Matsudaira Sukekuni	Daimyō of Hamamatsu; 1729–1744	Succeeded by Matsudaira Nobunao
