= Ōta Sukemune =

Japanese daimyō

Ōta Sukemune 太田資宗
- Born: December 27, 1600
- Died: February 22, 1680 (aged 79)
- Other names: Settsu-no-kami, Bitchu-no-kami
- Occupation: Daimyō

Ōta Sukemune (太田 資宗; December 27, 1600 – February 22, 1680) was a daimyō during early-Edo period Japan. His courtesy title was Bitchu no Kami.

== Biography ==
Ōta Sukemune was the second son of Ōta Shigemasa, a Sengoku period samurai descended from Ōta Dōkan, who entered into the service of Tokugawa Ieyasu after the fall of the Go-Hōjō clan in 1590. Shigemasa's elder sister, Eisho-in, later became one of Ieyasu's concubines.

When Sukemune was seven years old in 1606, he was introduced to Tokugawa Ieyasu in a formal audience. On the death of his father in 1610, he was confirmed as head of the Ōta clan and inherited his father's holdings of 5,600 koku in the Kantō region. In 1615, he received the courtesy title of Settsu-no-kami and lower 5th Court Rank. He continued in Ieyasu's service, receiving various minor commissions within the hierarchy of the Tokugawa shogunate, and in 1633 became one of the first group of wakadoshiyori.

In 1635, Sukemune was rewarded with properties in Shimotsuke Province with an assessed value of 10,000 koku, which (when added to his existing 5,600 koku) enabled him to become daimyō of the newly created Yamakawa Domain. His courtesy title was changed at that time to Bitchu-no-kami. In 1638, Yamakawa Domain was suppressed when Sukemune was transferred to Nishio Domain in Mikawa Province with an increase in revenues to 35,000 koku. From 1641–1643, he was appointed a bugyō overseeing the work of noted Confucian scholar Hayashi Razan.

In 1644, Sukemune was transferred to Hamamatsu Domain, a more prestigious posting, but with the same revenue rating of 35,000 koku. He retired from public life in 1671, leaving the domain to his second son, Ōta Suketsugu.

Sukemune was married to an adopted daughter of Itakura Shigemune, the Kyoto Shoshidai.

Preceded by	Daimyō of Yamakawa; 1635-1638	Succeeded by
Preceded by Honda Toshitsugu	Daimyō of Nishio; 1648-1644	Succeeded by Ii Naoyoshi
Preceded by Matsudaira Norinaga	Daimyō of Hamamatsu; 1644-1671	Succeeded by Ōta Suketsugu
