= Aoyama Munetoshi =

Japanese daimyō

Aoyama Munetoshi 青山宗俊
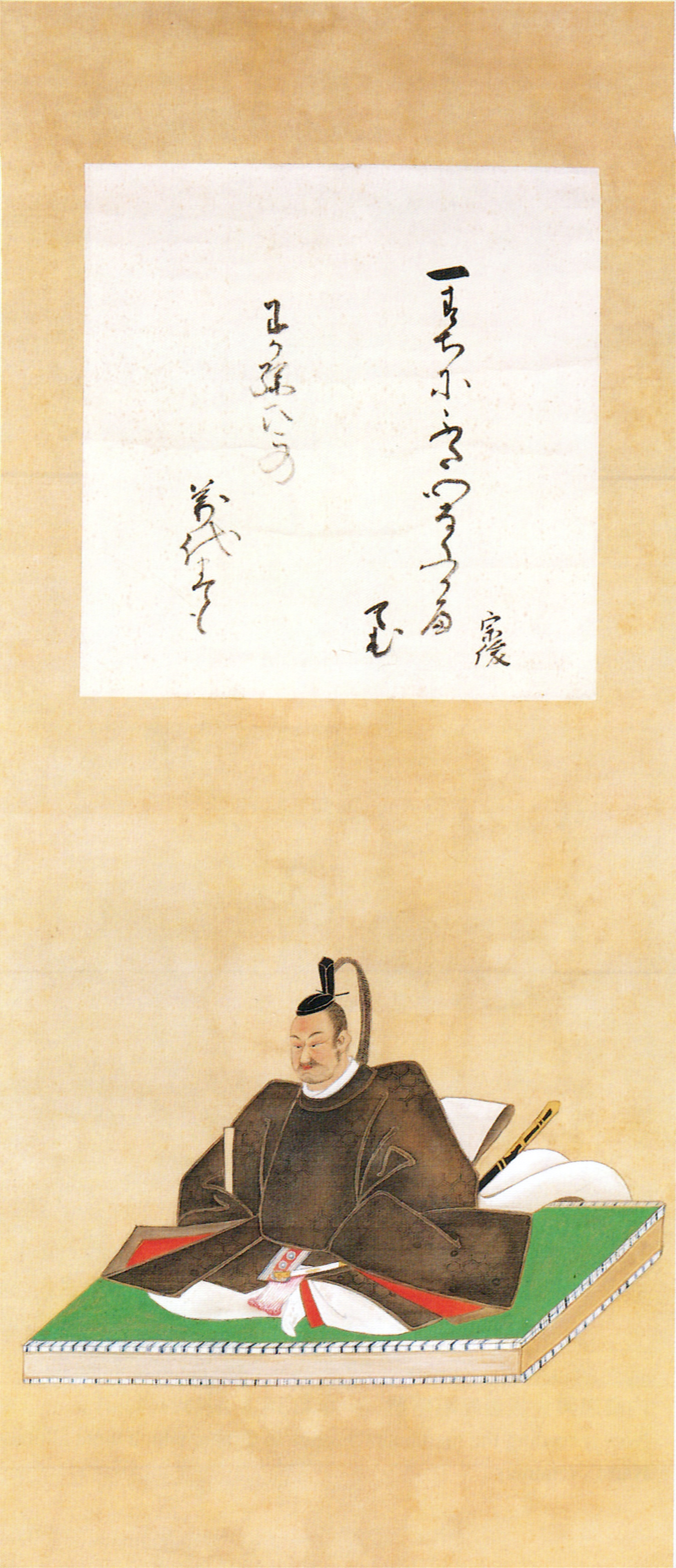
- Born: December 26, 1604
- Died: April 26, 1679 (aged 74)
- Other names: Inaba-no-kami
- Occupation: Daimyō

Aoyama Munetoshi (青山 宗俊; December 26, 1604 – March 26, 1679) was a daimyō during early-Edo period Japan. His courtesy title was Inaba-no-kami.

== Biography ==
Aoyama Munetoshi was the eldest son of Aoyama Tadatoshi, the daimyō of Iwatsuki Domain (Musashi Province) and later Ōtaki Domain (Kazusa Province). In 1623, his father fell out of favor with Shōgun Tokugawa Iemitsu, and was exiled to Kōza District in Sagami Province.

In 1634, Munetoshi received permission to return to Edo, and on December 1, 1638, was appointed to the minor post of Shoinbangashira, a hatamoto-level position with revenue of only 3000 koku. On May 23, 1644, he was promoted to Ōbangashira, and by January 19, 1648, received an additional 27,000 koku, which made him daimyō of the newly created Komoro Domain in Shinano Province.

On March 29, 1662, Munetoshi received the post of Osaka-jō dai (Castellan of Osaka). In order to take up his posting to Osaka, he surrendered Komoro Domain back to the shogunate, in exchange for 20,000 koku of additional territories scattered in Settsu, Kawachi and Izumi, Tōtōmi, Musashi and Sagami Provinces.

On December 26, 1669, Munetoshi received Lower 4th Court Rank. On August 18, 1678, he retired from his position of Osaka-jō dai and was assigned to Hamamatsu Domain in its place, which he ruled to his death on March 16, 1679. His grave is at the temple of Daitoku-ji in Kyoto.

Preceded by Matsudaira Norinaga	Daimyō of Komoro; 1648–1662	Succeeded by Sakai Tadayoshi
Preceded by Mizuno Tadamoto	13th Castellan of Osaka; 1662–1678	Succeeded by Ōta Suketsugu
Preceded by Ōta Suketsugu	Daimyō of Hamamatsu; 1678–1679	Succeeded by Aoyama Tadao
