= Matsudaira Norinaga =

Japanese daimyō

Matsudaira Norinaga 松平 乗寿
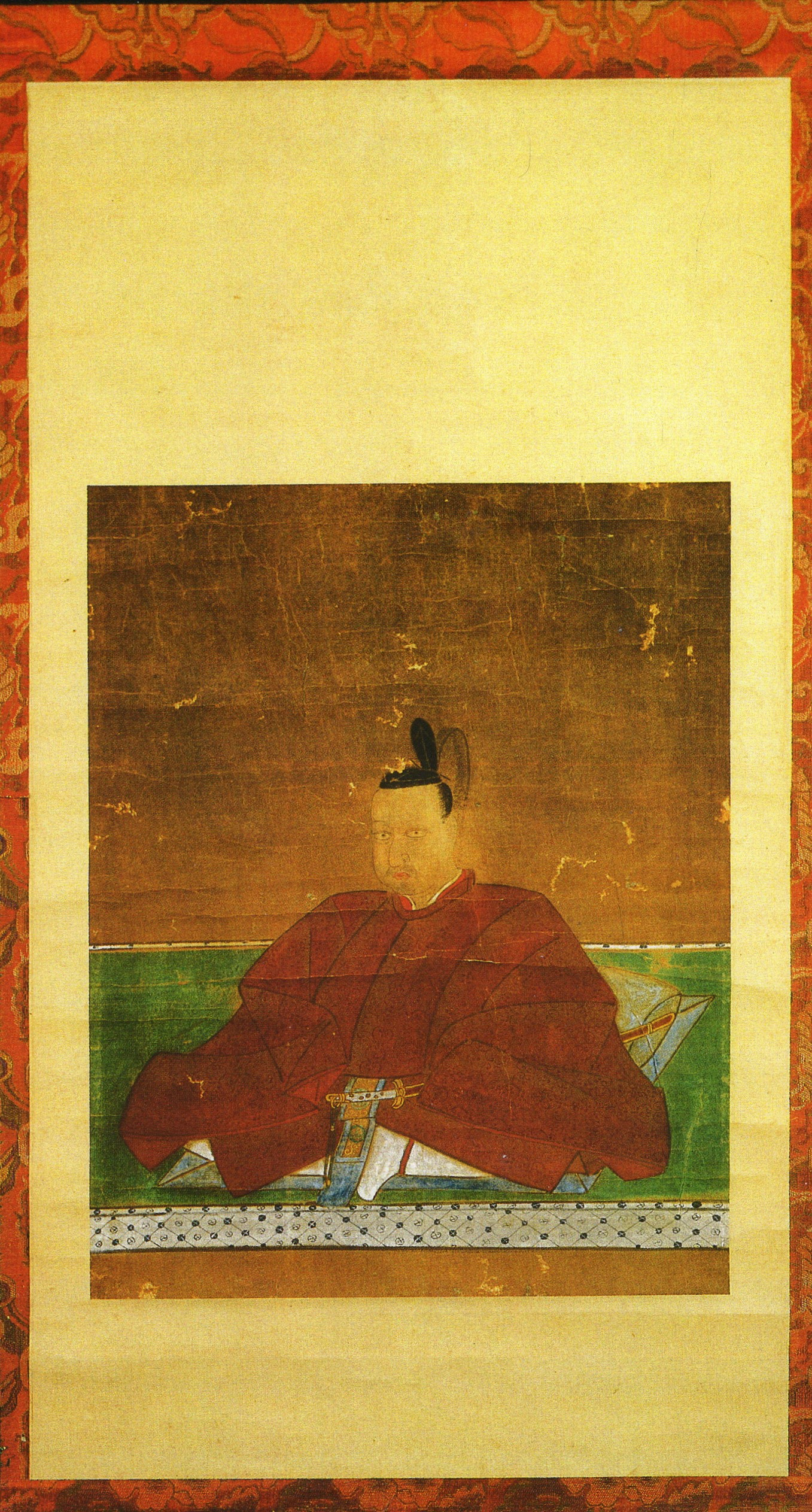
- Born: February 26, 1600
- Died: March 19, 1654 (aged 54)
- Occupation: Daimyō

Matsudaira Norinaga (松平 乗寿; February 26, 1600 – March 19, 1654) was a daimyō during early-Edo period Japan. He was the second head of the Ogyū-Matsudaira clan.

== Biography ==
Matsudaira Norinaga was the eldest son of Matsudaira Ienori, a Sengoku period samurai and daimyō of Iwamura Domain in Mino Province under the early Tokugawa shogunate. On the death of his father in 1614, he was confirmed as head of the Ogyū-Matsdaira clan and the same year accompanied the forces of Shōgun Tokugawa Hidetada at the Siege of Osaka. In 1634, he was transferred to Hamamatsu Domain in Tōtōmi Province with an increase in revenues from 20,000 to 36,000 koku.

In 1642, Matsudaira Norinaga was promoted to the post of Rōjū under Shōgun Tokugawa Iemitsu. From 1644, he was transferred to Tatebayashi Domain in Kōzuke Province with an increase in revenues to 60,000 koku, where he ruled to his death in 1654.

Matsudaira Norinaga was married to the daughter of Mizuno Tadayoshi, daimyō of Yoshida Domain in Mikawa Province.

Preceded by Matsudaira Ienori	Daimyō of Iwamura; 1614–1638	Succeeded by Niwa Ujinobu
Preceded by Kōriki Tadafusa	Daimyō of Hamamatsu; 1638–1644	Succeeded by Ōta Sukemune
Preceded by Sakakibara Tadatsugu	Daimyō of Tatebayashi; 1644–1654	Succeeded by Matsudaira Norihisa
