= Aoyama Tadashige =

Japanese daimyō

Aoyama Tadashige 青山忠重
- Born: July 7, 1654; Komoro, Shinano, Japan
- Died: December 6, 1722 (aged 68)
- Other names: Shimotsuke-no-kami; Inaba-no-kami
- Occupation: Daimyō

Aoyama Tadashige (青山 忠重; July 7, 1654 – December 6, 1722) was a daimyō during mid-Edo period Japan.

== Biography ==
Aoyama Tadashige was the third son of Aoyama Munetoshi, the daimyō of Komoro Domain and was born in Komoro, Shinano Province. On August 5, 1683, he was adopted by his sickly elder brother Aoyama Tadao, at the time daimyō of Hamamatsu Domain (Tōtōmi Province). He became 5th head of the Aoyama clan and daimyō of Hamamatsu on his brother's death in 1685.

On September 7, 1702, Tadashige was transferred to Kameyama Domain in Tanba Province (50,000 koku), where his descendants remained for the next three generations. In September 1714, his courtesy title was changed to Inaba-no-kami. On June 18, 1722, he turned his titles over to his fourth son, Aoyama Toshiharu. He subsequently took the tonsure, and died three months later at age 69.

His grave is at the temple of Tōkai-ji in Shinagawa, Tokyo.

Preceded by Aoyama Tadao	Daimyō of Hamamatsu; 1685–1702	Succeeded by Matsudaira Suketoshi
Preceded by Inoue Masamine	Daimyō of Kameyama; 1702–1722	Succeeded by Aoyama Tadashige
