= Matsudaira Suketoshi =

Japanese daimyō

Matsudaira Suketoshi 松平資俊
- Born: 1660
- Died: August 14, 1723 (aged 62–63)
- Other names: Honjō Suketoshi; Aki-no-kami, Bungō-no-kami, Hōki-no-kami
- Occupation: Daimyō

Matsudaira Suketoshi (松平 資俊; 1660 – August 14, 1723) was a hatamoto, and later a daimyō, during mid-Edo period Japan.

== Biography ==
Matsudaira Suketoshi was the second son of Honjō Munesuke, the daimyō of Kasama Domain in Hitachi Province. On October 10, 1684, he joined the ranks of the hatamoto in direct service to the shōgun and at the end of 1691 was allowed to assume the courtesy title of Aki-no-kami and Lower 5th Court Rank. On the death of his father in 1699, he became daimyō of Kasama Domain and head of the Honjō clan. Receiving Lower 4h Court Rank at the end of 1701, he was granted an additional 20,000 koku of territory in (Bitchu Province), bringing his total revenues to 70,000 koku. He was transferred to Hamamatsu Domain (Tōtōmi Province) in September 1702.

On March 23, 1705, Shōgun Tokugawa Tsunayoshi permitted him to take the surname of Matsudaira, with the reward extended posthumously to cover his father as well. His courtesy title also changed to Bungō-no-kami, and later to Hōki-no-kami.

Although Suketoshi was married and had several concubines, by whom he had numerous sons, on his death, he was succeeded by his wife's brother, whom he had adopted as his heir.

His grave is at the temple of Tōkai-ji in Shinagawa, Tokyo.

Preceded by Honjō Munesuke	Daimyō of Kasama; 1699–1702	Succeeded by Aoyama Tadashige
Preceded by Aoyama Tadashige	Daimyō of Hamamatsu; 1702–1723	Succeeded by Matsudaira Sukekuni
