= Matsudaira Iekiyo =

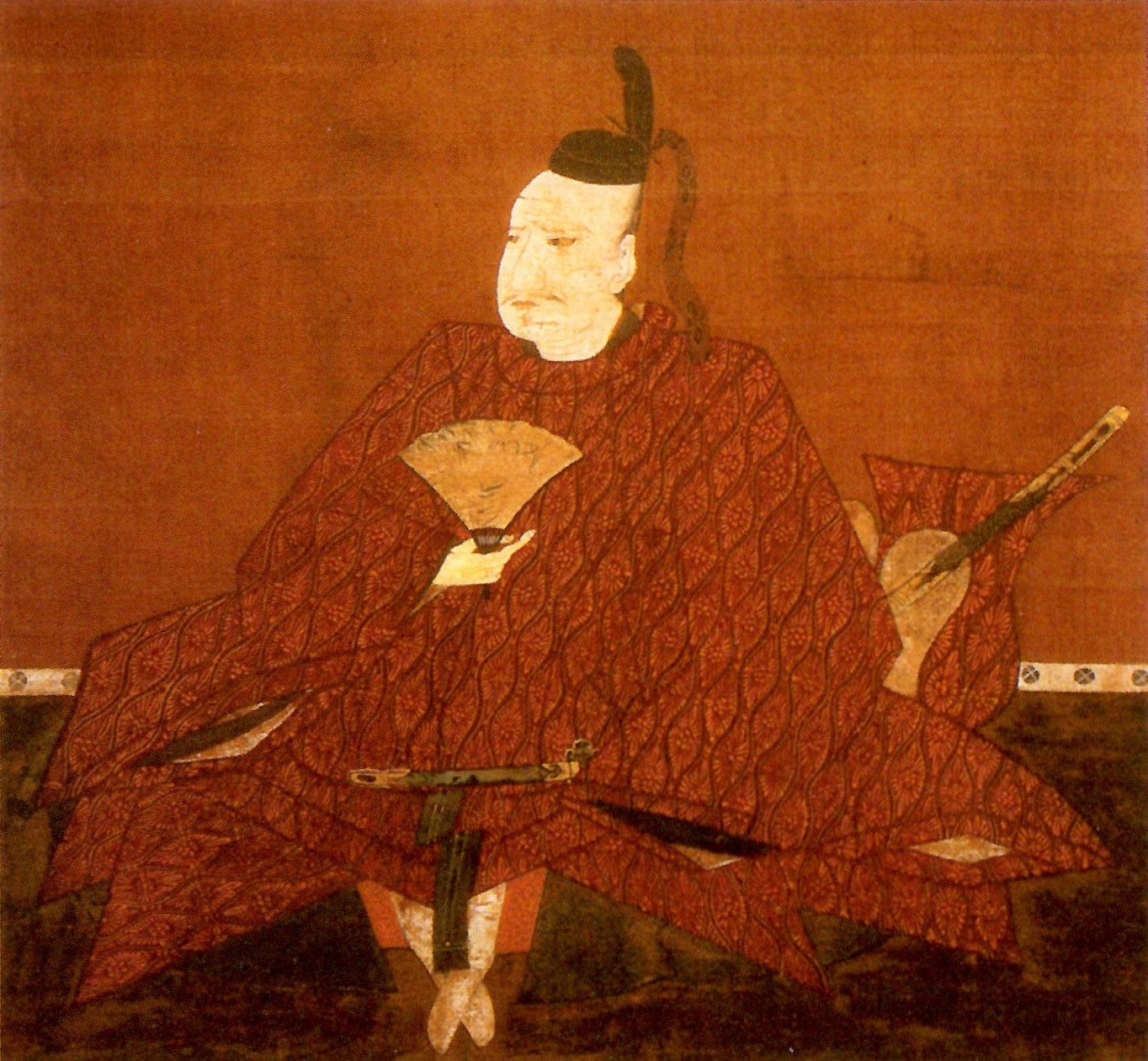
Matsudaira Iekiyo

Matsudaira Iekiyo (松平 家清) (1566 – February 3, 1611) was a Japanese samurai of the Azuchi–Momoyama period through early Edo period, who served the Tokugawa clan, and was later a daimyō. Iekiyo was the son of Matsudaira Kiyomune, and inherited headship of the Takenoya-Matsudaira clan. He served Tokugawa Ieyasu from an early age. When he came of age, received the Ie (家) character from Ieyasu's name, and thus called himself Iekiyo. In 1590, upon Ieyasu's entry into the Kantō, Iekiyo was rewarded for his services, and granted 10,000 koku of land at Hachimanyama, in Musashi Province.

During the Battle of Sekigahara, Iekiyo defended Kiyosu Castle in Owari. After the war, Ieyasu rewarded him again for his service, granting him lordship of the Yoshida Domain in Mikawa Province (30,000 koku). Iekiyo died in 1610 at age 45, and was succeeded by his son Tadakiyo.

Preceded by none	1st Daimyō of Yoshida (Takenoya-Matsudaira); 1600–1610	Succeeded by Matsudaira Tadakiyo
