= Aoyama Tadao =

Japanese daimyō (1651–1685)

Aoyama Tadao 青山忠雄
- Born: September 6, 1651; Komoro, Shinano, Japan
- Died: September 6, 1685 (aged 34)
- Other names: Izumi-no-kami
- Occupation: Daimyō

Aoyama Tadao (青山 忠雄; September 6, 1651 – September 6, 1685) was a daimyō during early-Edo period Japan. His courtesy title was Izumi-no-kami.

== Biography ==
Aoyama Tadao was the second son of Aoyama Munetoshi, the daimyō of Hamamatsu Domain (Tōtōmi Province), and was born in Komoro, Shinano Province. On his father's death in 1679, he became 4th head of the Aoyama clan and daimyō of Hamamatsu Domain.

Aoyama Tadao was married to a daughter of Sanada Nobumasa, daimyō of Matsushiro Domain in Shinano Province. He died in 1685 at the relatively young age of 35 without a direct heir, and the succession went to Aoyama Tadashige, the son of his younger brother. His grave is at the temple of Daitoku-ji in Kyoto.

Preceded by Aoyama Munetoshi	Daimyō of Hamamatsu; 1679-1685	Succeeded by Aoyama Tadashige
