= Shimotsuma Domain =

Feudal domain in Japan

Shimotsuma Domain 下妻藩
- under Tokugawa shogunate Japan
- 1606; 420 years ago–1871; 155 years ago
- Capital: Shimotsuma jin'ya
  - Type: Daimyō
- Historical era: Edo period
  - Established: 1606; 420 years ago
  - Disestablished: 1871; 155 years ago
- Today part of: part of Ibaraki Prefecture

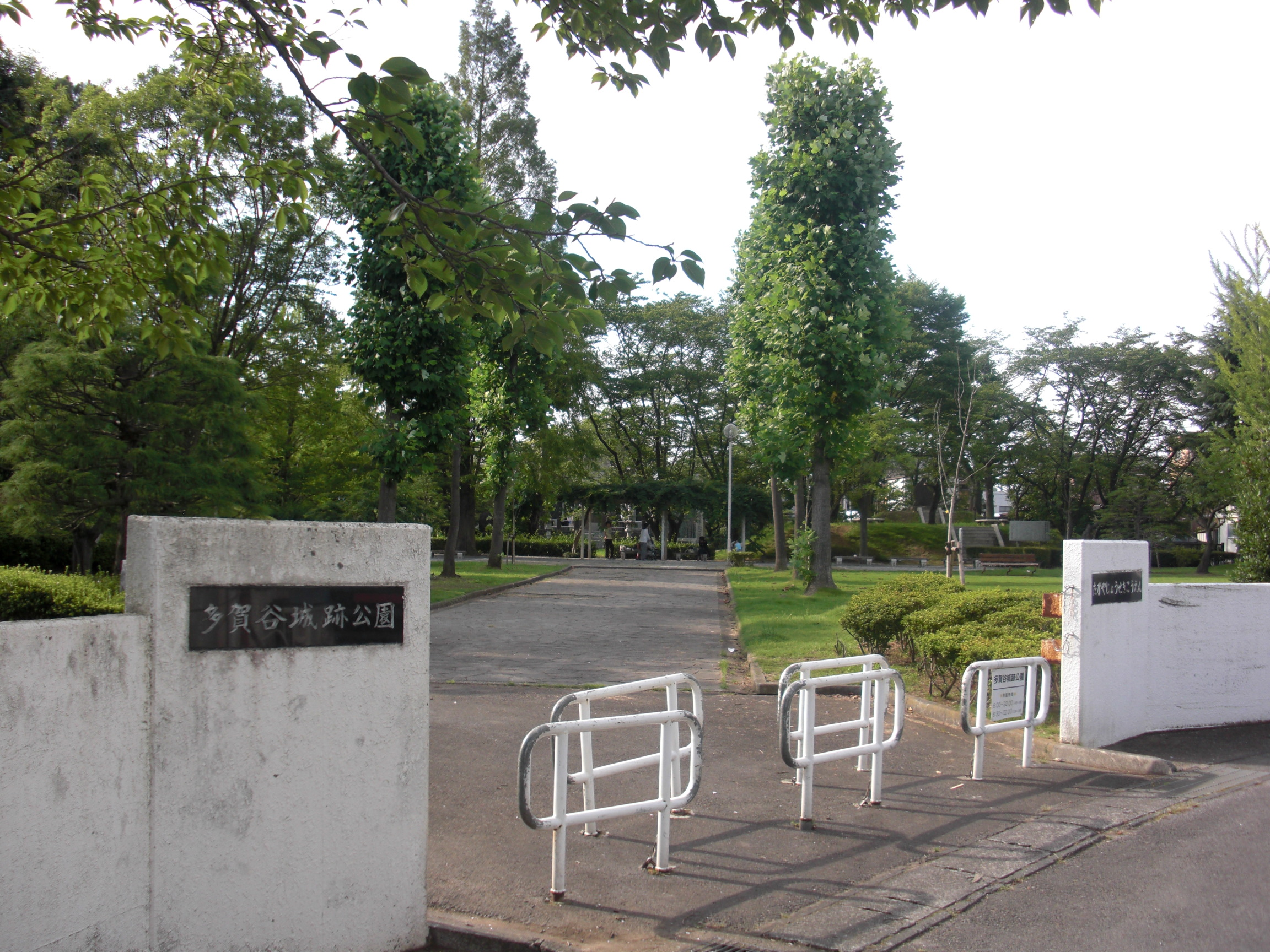
Entrance to the site of Tagaya Castle, predecessor of Shimotsuma Castle, upon which Shimotsuma Jin'ya, administrative center of Shimotsuma Domain was later built

Shimotsuma Domain (下妻藩, Shimotsuma-han) was a feudal domain under the Tokugawa shogunate of Edo period Japan, located in Hitachi Province (modern-day Ibaraki Prefecture), Japan. It was centered on Shimotsuma Jin'ya in what is now the city of Shimotsuma, Ibaraki. It was ruled for much of its history by a junior branch of the Inoue clan; however, it suffered from frequent changes of rules due to the tendency of the Inoue daimyō to die at young ages.

== History ==
During the Sengoku period, the area around Shimotsuma was controlled by the Tagaya clan, retainers of the Yūki clan. Although the Tagaya clan pledged allegiance to Tokugawa Ieyasu following the Battle of Odawara in 1590, their support of the Tokugawa was less than lukewarm, and during the Battle of Sekigahara, the clan defected to the Uesugi clan, and were therefore stripped of their 60,000 koku holdings.

The domain was then awarded to the 11th son of Tokugawa Ieyasu, Tokugawa Yorifusa, who later went on to become founder of the Mito Domain. He was replaced at Shimotsuma by Matsudaira Tadamasa, the son of Yūki Hideyasu, followed by Matsudaira Sadatsuna. After his transfer to Kakegawa Domain in 1619, the domain became tenryō territory controlled directly by the shogunate until 1712.

In 1712, Inoue Tadanaga, a confidant and retainer of Tokugawa Ienobu from the time before he became Shōgun, had risen through the government hierarchy and through merit and inheritance, has achieved the 10,000 koku necessary for daimyō status. Shimotsuma Domain was revived to become his fiefdom, and remained in the hands of the Inoue clan until the Meiji restoration. However, ten of the 14 Inoue daimyō were adopted into the clan from other families due to the tendency of the rulers to die young and without heir.

During the Boshin War, the final Inoue daimyō, Inoue Masaoto initially sided with the pro-Tokugawa forces, but then switched sides to the Imperial cause. However, many of his samurai opposed this change, and defected to fight on the side of Aizu Domain during the Battle of Aizu. Because of this, the Meiji government initially declared him to be a traitor and forfeit of his domain, but due to the strong arguments of his karō and the seppuku of leading pro-Tokugawa retainers, the decision was rescinded. He was later elevated to the kazoku peerage with the title of viscount (shishaku) during the Meiji period.

The domain had a population of 2055 people in 329 households per a census in 1855.

== Holdings at the end of the Edo period ==
As with most domains in the han system, Shimotsuma Domain consisted of several discontinuous territories calculated to provide the assigned kokudaka, based on periodic cadastral surveys and projected agricultural yields.

- Hitachi Province
  - 23 villages in Makabe District
- Shimotsuke Province
  - 12 villages in Tsuga District
- Musashi Province
  - 5 villages in Saitama District
  - 2 villages in Ōsato District

== List of daimyō ==
#	Name	Tenure	Courtesy title	Court Rank	kokudaka
Tagaya clan (tozama) 1591–1601
1	Tagaya Shigetsune (多賀谷 重経)	1591–1601	-unknown-	60,000 koku	
Tokugawa clan (Shinpan) 1606–1609
1	Matsudaira Tsuruchiyo-maru (松平鶴千代丸)	1606–1609	-none-	-none-	100,000 koku
	tenryō	1609–1615			
Echizen-Matsudaira clan (Shinpan) 1615–1616
1	Matsudaira Tadamasa (松平忠昌)	1615–1616	Iyo-no-kami (伊予守)	Lower 5th (従五位下)	30,000 koku
Hisamatsu-Matsudaira clan (Shinpan) 1616–1618
1	Matsudaira Sadatsuna (松平定綱)	1616–1618	Echu-no-kami (越中守)	Lower 5th (従五位下)	30,000 koku
	tenryō	1619–1712			
Inoue clan (Fudai) 1712–1871
1	Inoue Masanaga (井上正長)	1712–1720	Tōtōmi-no-kami (遠江守)	Lower 5th (従五位下)	10,000 koku
2	Inoue Masaatsu (井上正敦)	1720–1753	Tōtōmi-no-kami (遠江守)	Lower 5th (従五位下)	10,000 koku
3	Inoue Masatoki (井上正辰)	1753–1760	Tōtōmi-no-kami (遠江守)	Lower 5th (従五位下)	10,000 koku
4	Inoue Masamune (井上正意)	1760–1784	Tōtōmi-no-kami (遠江守)	Lower 5th (従五位下)	10,000 koku
5	Inoue Masaki (井上正棠)	1784–1789	Tōtōmi-no-kami (遠江守)	Lower 5th (従五位下)	10,000 koku
6	Inoue Masahiro (井上正広)	1789–1814	Tōtōmi-no-kami (遠江守)	Lower 5th (従五位下)	10,000 koku
7	Inoue Masanori (井上正建)	1814–1816	Sakon-no-shōgen (左近将監)	Lower 5th (従五位下)	10,000 koku
8	Inoue Masatomo (井上正廬)	1816–1819	Naizen-no-kami (内膳正)	Upper 5th (従五位上)	10,000 koku
9	Inoue Masatami (井上正民)	1819–1828	Tōtōmi-no-kami (遠江守)	Lower 5th (従五位下)	10,000 koku
10	Inoue Masakata (井上正健)	1828–1845	Tōtōmi-no-kami (遠江守)	Lower 5th (従五位下)	10,000 koku
11	Inoue Masayoshi (井上正誠)	1845–1852	Tōtōmi-no-kami (遠江守)	Lower 5th (従五位下)	10,000 koku
12	Inoue Masanobu (井上正信)	1852–1856	Tōtōmi-no-kami (遠江守)	Lower 5th (従五位下)	10,000 koku
13	Inoue Masakane (井上正兼)	1856–1876	Iyo-no-kami (伊予守)	Lower 5th (従五位下)	10,000 koku
14	Inoue Masaoto (井上正巳)	1866–1871	Iyo-no-kami (伊予守)	Lower 5th (従五位下)	10,000 koku
