= Yukari Mizuno =

Japanese actress

Yukari Mizuno (水野友加里 Mizuno Yukari; born October 5, 1986, in Tokyo) is a Japanese actress who appeared in movies such as Ice Memory, Director! and The sign man falling in love.

== Filmography ==
- 「アイスメモリ」(Ice Memory)「カントク」(Director! )「恋するサインマン」(The sign man falling in love) (2005)
