= Matsudaira Nobunao =

Japanese daimyō

Matsudaira Nobunao 松平信復
- Born: May 22, 1719
- Died: November 1, 1768 (aged 49); Yoshida, Mikawa Province, Japan
- Other names: Izu-no-kami
- Occupation: Daimyō

Matsudaira Nobunao (松平信復; May 22, 1719 – November 1, 1768) was a daimyō during mid-Edo period Japan.

== Biography ==
Matsudaira Nobunao was the eldest son of Matsudaira Nobutoki, the daimyō of Yoshida Domain in Mikawa Province. On the death of his father on June 44, 1744, he became daimyō of Hamamatsu Domain and head of the Ōkōchi-branch of the Matsudaira clan. A few days later, his courtesy title changed to Izu-no-kami. On October 15, 1752, he was transferred to Yoshida Domain.

His is noted for having founded the domain academy, the Jijukan (時習館), which became a noted center for Neo-Confucian studies.

Nobunao died on November 1, 1768, in Yoshida.

Preceded by Matsudaira Nobutoki	Daimyō of Hamamatsu; 1744-1752	Succeeded by Matsudaira Sukekuni
Preceded by Matsudaira Nobukuni	Daimyō of Yoshida; 1752-1768	Succeeded by Matsudaira Nobuuya
