= Hamamatsu Domain =

Hamamatsu Domain 浜松藩
- under Tokugawa shogunate Japan
- 1601–1868
- Capital: Hamamatsu Castle
  - Type: Daimyō
- Historical era: Edo period
  - Established: 1601
  - Disestablished: 1868
- Today part of: Shizuoka Prefecture

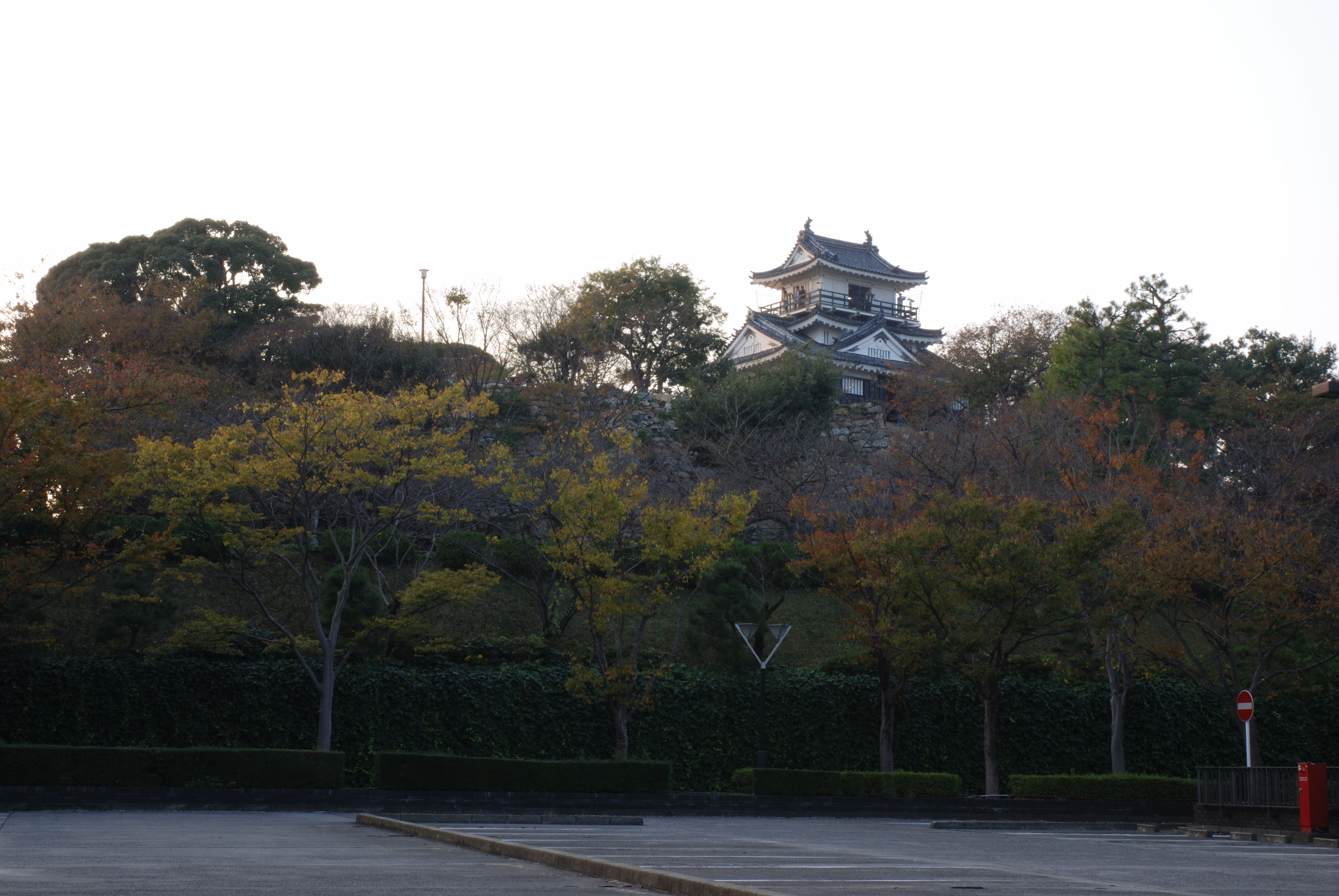
Hamamatsu Castle

Hamamatsu Domain (浜松藩, Hamamatsu-han) was a Japanese domain of the Edo period, located in Tōtōmi Province. It was centered on what is now Hamamatsu Castle in what is now the city of Hamamatsu in Shizuoka Prefecture.

Hamamatsu was the residence of Tokugawa Ieyasu for much of his early career, and Hamamatsu Castle was nicknamed "Promotion Castle" (出世城, Shussei-jō) due to Ieyasu's promotion to shōgun. The domain was thus considered a prestigious posting, and was seen as a stepping stone in a daimyō's rise to higher levels with the administration of the Tokugawa shogunate, such rōjū or wakadoshiyori.

The domain had a population of 3324 samurai in 776 households at the start of the Meiji period. The domain maintained its primary residence (kamiyashiki) in Edo at Toranomon until the An'ei (1772–1781) period, and at Nihonbashi-Hamacho until the Meiji period

== Holdings at the end of the Edo period ==
As with most domains in the han system, Hamamatsu Domain consisted of several discontinuous territories calculated to provide the assigned kokudaka, based on periodic cadastral surveys and projected agricultural yields.

- Tōtōmi Province
  - 94 villages in Fuchi District
  - 87 villages in Nagakami District
  - 28 villages in Toyoda District
  - 3 villages in Saya District
  - 2 villages in Kitō District
- Shimōsa Province
  - 38 villages in Inba District
- Harima Province
  - 7 villages in Minō District
  - 19 villages in Katō District

== List of daimyōs ==
#	Name	Tenure	Courtesy title	Court Rank	kokudaka
Matsudaira (Sakurai) clan (fudai) 1601–1609
1	Matsudaira Tadayori (松平忠頼)	1601–1609	Uma-no-jo (右馬允)	Lower 5th (従五位下)	50,000 koku
Kōriki clan (fudai) 1619–1638
1	Kōriki Tadafusa (高力 忠房)	1619–1638	Sakon-no-taifu (左近大夫)	Lower 5th (従五位下)	35,000 koku
Matsudaira (Ogyū) clan (fudai) 1638–1644
1	Matsudaira Norinaga (松平(大給)乗寿)	1638–1644	Izumi-no-kami (和泉守)	Lower 5th (従五位下)	36,000 koku
Ōta clan (fudai) 1644–1678
1	Ōta Sukemune (太田資宗)	1644–1671	Bitchu-no-kami (備中守)	Lower 5th (従五位下)	35,000 koku
2	Ōta Suketsugu (太田資次)	1671–1678	Settsu-no-kami (摂津守)	Lower 4th (従四位下)	35,000 koku
Aoyama clan (fudai) 1678–1702
1	Aoyama Munetoshi (青山宗俊)	1678–1679	Inaba-no-kami (因幡守)	Lower 4th (従四位下)	50,000 koku
2	Aoyama Tadao (青山忠雄)	1679–1685	Izumi-no-kami (和泉守)	Lower 5th (従五位下)	50,000 koku
3	Aoyama Tadashige (青山忠重)	1685–1702	Shimotsuke-no-kami (下野守)	Lower 5th (従五位下)	50,000 koku
Matsudaira (Honjō) clan (fudai) 1702–1729
1	Matsudaira Suketoshi (松平 資俊)	1702–1723	Hoki-no-kami (伯耆守)	Lower 4th (従四位下)	70,000 koku
2	Matsudaira Sukekuni (松平 資訓)	1702–1729	Bungo-no-kami (豊後守)	Lower 5th (従五下)	70,000 koku
Matsudaira (Ōkōchi/Nagasawa clan) (fudai) 1729–1752
1	Matsudaira Nobutoki (松平 信祝)	1729–1744	Izu-no-kami (伊豆守): Jijū (侍従)	Lower 4th (従四位下)	70,000 koku
2	Matsudaira Nobunao (松平 信復)	1744–1752	Izu-no-kami (伊豆守)	Lower 5th (従五下)	70,000 koku
Matsudaira (Honjō) clan (fudai) 1749–1768
1	Matsudaira Sukekuni (松平 資訓)	1749–1752	Bungo-no-kami (豊後守); Jijū (侍従)	Lower 4th (従四位下)	70,000 koku
2	Matsudaira Sukemasa (松平 資昌)	1752–1768	Iyo-no-kami (伊予守)	Lower 5th (従五下)	70,000 koku
Inoue clan (fudai)
1	Inoue Masatsune (井上正経)	1768-1766	Kawachi-no-kami (河内守); Jijū (侍従)	Lower 4th (従四位下)	60,000 koku
2	Inoue Masasada (井上正定)	1766–1786	Kawachi-no-kami (河内守)	Lower 5th (従四位下)	60,000 koku
3	Inoue Masamoto (井上正甫)	1786–1817	Kawachi-no-kami (河内守)	Lower 5th (従五下)	60,000 koku
Mizuno clan (fudai) 1817–1856
1	Mizuno Tadakuni (水野忠邦)	1817–1845	Echizen-no-kami (越前守); Jijū (侍従)	Lower 4th (従四位下)	60,000 koku
2	Mizuno Tadakiyo (水野 忠精)	1845–1856	Izumi-no-kami' (和泉守); Jijū (侍従)	Lower 4th (従四位下)	50,000 koku
Inoue clan (fudai) 1845-1868
1	Inoue Masaharu (井上正春)	1845–1847	Kawachi-no-kami (河内守); Jijū (侍従)	Lower 4th (従四位下)	60,000 koku
2	Inoue Masanao (井上正直)	1847–1868	Kawachi-no-kami (河内守); Jijū (侍従)	Lower 4th (従四位下)	60,000 koku

== See also ==
- List of Han
