= Mizuno Tadahiro =

Japanese politician

Viscount Mizuno Tadahiro
- 水野 忠弘
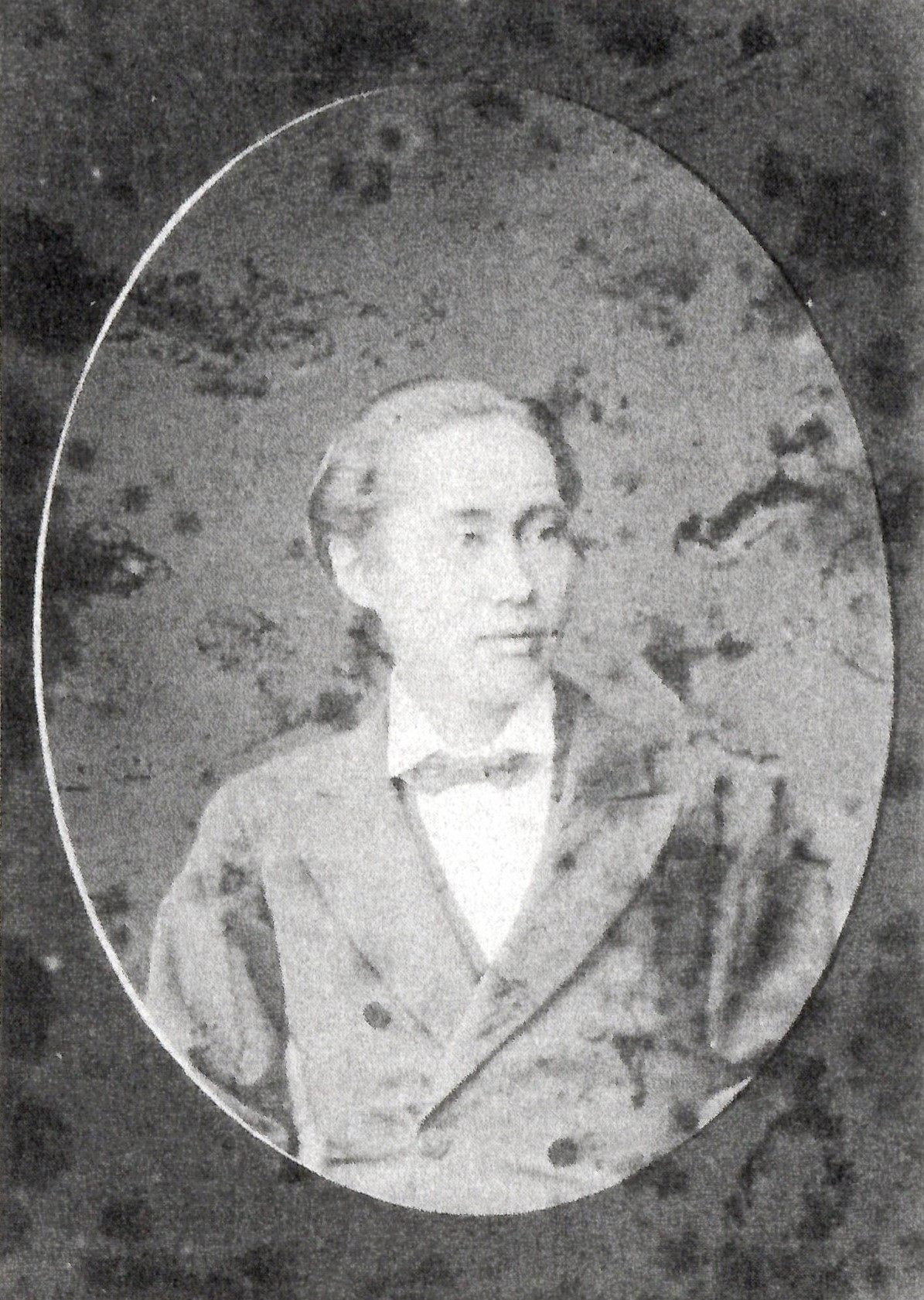

Member of the House of Peers
- In office 10 July 1904 – 7 December 1905 Elected by the Viscounts

Governor of Asahiyama Domain
- In office 1870–1871
- Monarch: Meiji
- Preceded by: Himself (as Daimyō of Yamagata)
- Succeeded by: Position abolished

Daimyō of Yamagata Domain
- In office 1866–1870
- Shōgun: Tokugawa Iemochi; Tokugawa Yoshinobu
- Preceded by: Mizuno Tadakiyo
- Succeeded by: Himself (as Governor of Asahiyama)

Personal details
- Born: 19 July 1856
- Died: 7 December 1906 (aged 50) Tokyo, Japan
- Spouse: Daughter of Mizuno Tadamoto of Kii-Shingu Domain
- Domestic partner: Daughter of Date Munenari of Uwajima Domain
- Parent: Mizuno Tadakiyo (father)

Mizuno Tadahiro (水野忠弘; 19 July 1856 – 7 December 1905) was the 2nd Mizuno daimyō of Yamagata Domain during Bakumatsu period Japan. His courtesy title was Izumi-no-kami.

== Biography ==
Mizuno Tadahiro was the eldest son of Mizuno Tadakiyo, and became daimyō on his father's retirement in 1866. In 1868, he travelled with his father to Kyoto to pledge fealty to the new Meiji government; however while in Kyoto the domain declared itself for the pro-Tokugawa Ōuetsu Reppan Dōmei. He pleaded to be allowed to return to Yamagata to resolve the situation peacefully, but his requests were denied, and Yamagata was soon subdued by government armies. Tadakiyo and his father were placed under house arrest and the karō of the domain, Mizuno Motonobu, was executed for treason. In 1869, he was released from house arrest, and in 1870 was appointed imperial governor of Asahiyama in Omi Province. This consisted of 10 villages which were formerly an exclave of Yamagata Domain, and 93 villages which had either been hatamoto holdings, or had been minor exclaves of other domains. With the abolition of the han system in 1871, he relocated to Tokyo and enrolled in the Keio Gijuku university. Mizuno Tadahiro spent 3000 ryō annually from his own fortune to assist ex-samurai of the domain to become farmers. In 1884, he became a viscount (shishaku) in the new kazoku peerage.

In 1904, he was accorded a seat in the House of Peers. He died in 1905 without a male heir and his title went to his younger brother, Mizuno Tadazane.
