= Inoue Masaoto =

Japanese daimyō

- 井上 正巳
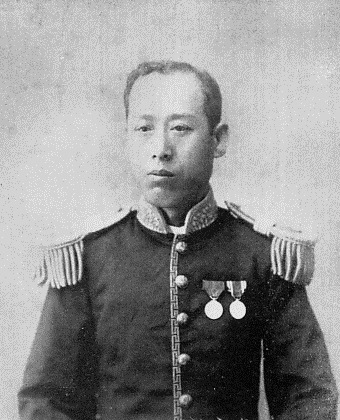
- Born: February 10, 1856
- Died: September 14, 1921 (aged 65)
- Military career
- Allegiance: Shimotsuma Domain
- Rank: Daimyō
- Conflicts: Boshin War

Inoue Masaoto (井上 正巳) (February 10, 1856 – September 14, 1921) was a Japanese daimyō of the Edo period, who served as the last lord of the Shimotsuma Domain. His court title was Iyo no kami. Under his leadership, Shimotsuma fought on the side of Aizu during the Boshin War.

Masaoto was created shishaku (viscount) in the Meiji-era kazoku nobility.

Preceded by Inoue Masakane	14th Daimyō of Shimotsuma (Inoue); 1866–1871	Succeeded by none (domain abolished)
