= Mizuno Tadakiyo =

Japanese daimyō (1833–1884)

- 水野忠精
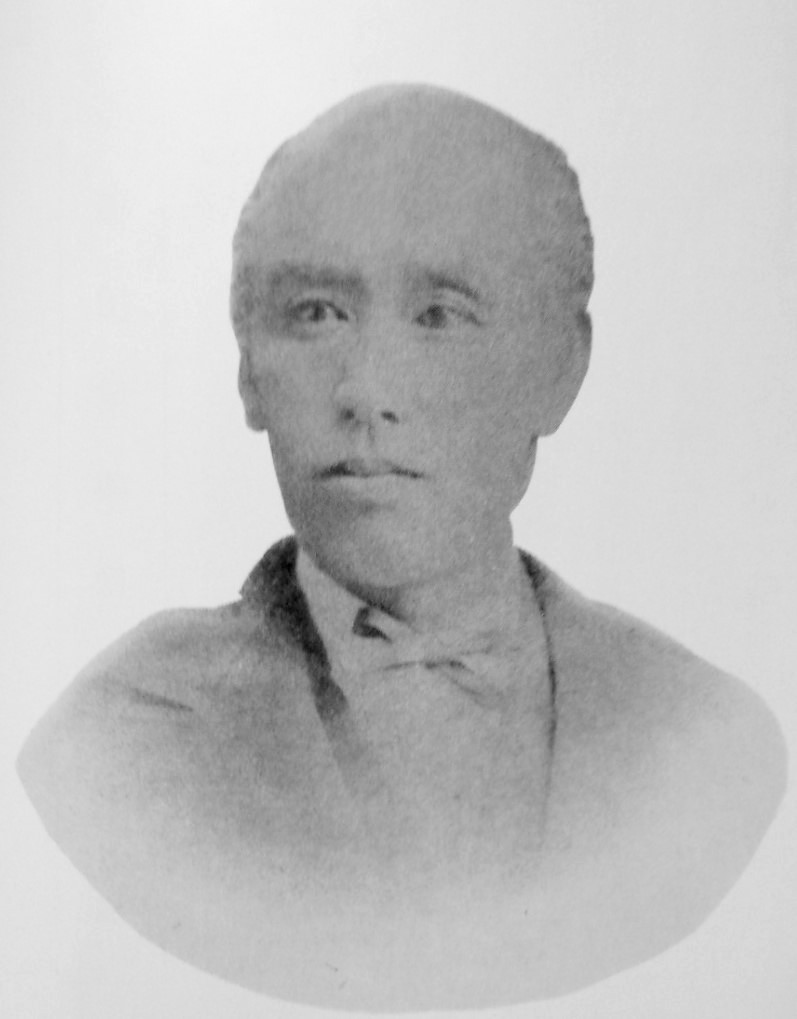
- Mizuno Tadakiyo
- Monarchs: Shōgun: Tokugawa Ieyoshi; Tokugawa Iesada; Tokugawa Iemochi

1st Daimyō of Yamagata Domain
- In office 1845–1866
- Preceded by: Akimoto Yukitomo
- Succeeded by: Mizuno Tadahiro

1st Daimyō of Hamamatsu Domain
- In office 1845–1845
- Preceded by: Mizuno Tadakuni
- Succeeded by: Inoue Masaharu

Personal details
- Born: February 5, 1833
- Died: May 8, 1884 (aged 51); Tokyo, Japan
- Spouse: daughter of Inoue Masaharu of Tanagura Domain
- Parent: Mizuno Tadakuni (father)

Mizuno Tadakiyo (水野 忠精; February 5, 1833 – May 8, 1884) was a daimyō during Bakumatsu period Japan, who served as chief senior councilor (Rōjū) in service to the Tokugawa shogunate.

== Biography ==
Mizuno Tadakiyo was the eldest son of Mizuno Tadakuni, the daimyō of Hamamatsu Domain and chief senior councilor (Rōjū) in service to the Tokugawa shogunate. After the failure of the Tenpō Reforms, Tadakuni was forced into retirement and exile, and turned the leadership of the Mizuno clan and the position of daimyō of Hamamatsu Domain to Tadakiyo in 1845.

However, the same year, Tadakuni was reassigned to Yamagata Domain (50,000 koku) in Dewa Province. After the pardon of his father in 1851, Tadakuni’s fortunes improved. Within the shogunal administration, he received the post of Jisha-bugyō (Commissioner of Shrine and Temples) and wakadoshiyori (Junior Councilor). In 1862, he became a Rōjū in the service of Shōgun Tokugawa Iemochi.

As Rōjū, he worked with Oguri Tadamasa in the construction of Yokosuka Naval Arsenal as part of the Tokugawa shogunate’s efforts to modernize Japan’s military.

He retired from public life in 1866 on the death of Shōgun Tokugawa Iemochi, and was succeeded at Yamagata by his son Mizuno Tadahiro. Mizuno Tadakiyo was married to a daughter of Inoue Masahari, a fellow Rōjū and daimyō of Tanagura Domain.
