= Yoshida Domain =

Toyohashi Domain (1869–1871) 豊橋藩 Mikawa-Yoshida Domain (1600–1869) 三河吉田藩
- Domain of Japan
- 1600–1749; 1752–1871
- Capital: Yoshida Castle
  - Type: Daimyō
- Historical era: Edo period
  - Established: 1600
  - Disestablished: 1871
- Today part of: Aichi Prefecture

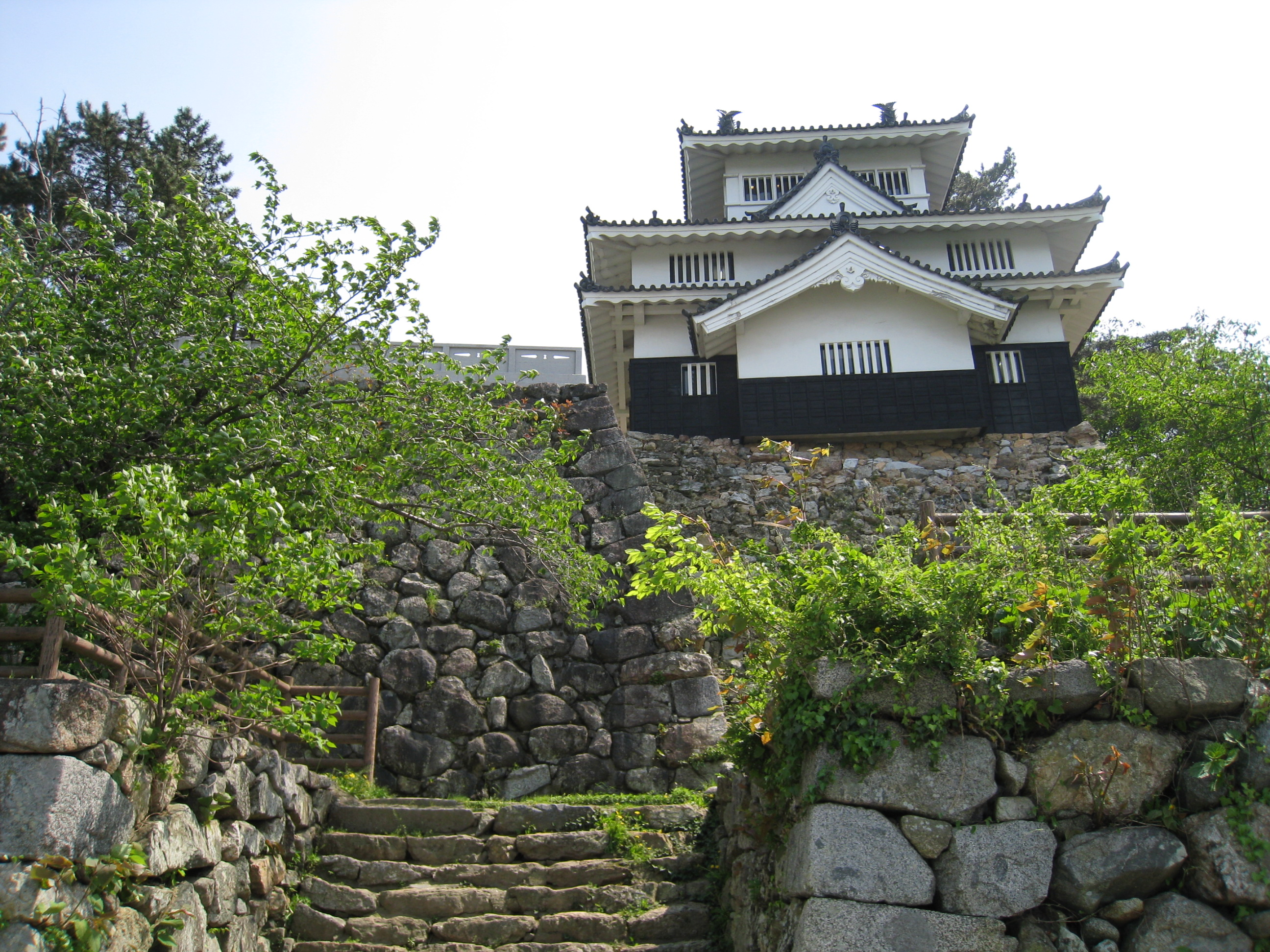
Yoshida Castle, administrative center of Yoshida Domain

Yoshida Domain (吉田藩, Yoshida-han) was a Japanese feudal domain under the Tokugawa shogunate of Edo period Japan, located in Mikawa Province located in eastern Mikawa Province (modern-day eastern Aichi Prefecture), Japan. It was centered on Yoshida Castle in what is now the city of Toyohashi, Aichi. It was ruled by a number of different fudai daimyō over the course of the Edo period, before finally passing into the hands of the Matsudaira (Ōkōchi) clan. Just before its dissolution it was renamed, and it became the Toyohashi Domain (豊橋藩, Toyohashi-han).

== History ==
Following the Battle of Odawara in 1590, Toyotomi Hideyoshi transferred Tokugawa Ieyasu to the Kantō region, and gave a portion of his former territories in eastern Mikawa to Ikeda Terumasa. Terumasa developed the castle town around Yoshida Castle and embarked on a massive and ambitious expansion plan for the castle itself. However, following the Battle of Sekigahara, he was reassigned to Himeji Castle, and left Yoshida even before a central donjon had been completed.

Following the creation of the Tokugawa shogunate, Yoshida became center of Yoshida Domain. The holding was considered strategic due to its location. It was a post station on the Tōkaidō connecting Edo and Kyoto. It was also an ocean port and river port.

After the establishment of the Tokugawa shogunate, Yoshida Castle became the center of Yoshida Domain, a feudal domain, which occupied a strategic position on the Tōkaidō between Edo and Nagoya. The domain was assigned to several different fudai daimyō clans until coming into the possession of the Matsudaira (Nagasawa-Ōkōchi) clan in 1752, which remained in residence at Yoshida until the Meiji Restoration.

The final daimyō of Yoshida, Matsudaira Nobuhisa, held a number of important posts in the Bakumatsu period government. With the Boshin War, the samurai of the domain were deeply divided over which side to support. However, with the fall of Nagoya Domain to pro-Imperial forces in February 1868, he surrendered the castle without resistance to the Meiji government in March 1868. Due to possible confusion with Iyo-Yoshida Domain, the name of the domain was changed to “Toyohashi Domain” in June 1869.

After the end of the conflict, with the abolition of the han system in July 1871, Toyohashi Domain became “Toyohashi Prefecture”, which merged with the short lived Nukata Prefecture in November 1871, which later became part of Aichi Prefecture.

The domain had a population of 76,228 people in 17,517 households per an 1869 census.

== Holdings at the end of the Edo period ==
As with most domains in the han system, Yoshida Domain consisted of several discontinuous territories calculated to provide the assigned kokudaka, based on periodic cadastral surveys and projected agricultural yields.

- Mikawa Province
  - 5 villages in Nukata District
  - 47 villages in Kamo District
  - 54 villages in Hoi District
  - 67 villages in Atsumi District
  - 48 villages in Yana District
- Tōtōmi Province
  - 3 villages in Kitō District
  - 19 villages in Fuchi District
- Omi Province
  - 20 villages in Asai District
  - 2 villages in Ika District
  - 1 village in Takashima District

== List of daimyō ==
| # | Name | Tenure | Courtesy title | Court Rank | kokudaka |
|---|---|---|---|---|---|
Matsudaira (Takenoya) clan (fudai) 1600–1612
| 1 | Matsudaira Iekiyo (松平 家清) | 1600–1610 | Genba-no-kami (玄蕃頭) | Lower 5th (従五位下) | 30,000 koku |
| 2 | Matsudaira Tadakiyo (松平忠清) | 1610–1612 | Genba-no-kami (玄蕃頭) | Lower 5th (従五位下) | 30,000 koku |
Matsudaira (Fukōzu) clan (fudai) 1612–1632
| 1 | Matsudaira Tadatoshi (松平忠利) | 1612–1632 | Tonomo-no-kami (主殿頭) | Lower 5th (従五位下) | 30,000 koku |
| 2 | Matsudaira Tadafusa (松平忠房) | 1632–1632 | Tonomo-no-kami (主殿頭) | Lower 5th (従五位下) | 30,000 koku |
Mizuno clan (fudai) 1632–1645
| 1 | Mizuno Tadakiyo (水野忠清) | 1632–1642 | Hayato-no-kami (隼人正) | Lower 5th (従五位下) | 40,000 koku |
| 2 | Mizuno Tadayoshi (水野忠善) | 1642–1645 | Daigenmotsu (大監物) | Lower 5th (従五位下) | 45,000 koku |
Ogasawara clan (fudai) 1645–1697
| 1 | Ogasawara Tadatomo (小笠原忠知) | 1645–1663 | Oki-no-kami (壱岐守) | Lower 5th (従五位下) | 45,000-->40,000 koku |
| 2 | Ogasawara Naganori (小笠原長矩) | 1663–1678 | Yamashiro-no-kami (山城守) | Lower 5th (従五位下) | 40,000 koku |
| 3 | Ogasawara Nagasuke (小笠原長祐) | 1678–1690 | Oki-no-kami (壱岐守) | Lower 5th (従五位下) | 40,000 koku |
| 4 | Ogasawara Nagashige (小笠原長重) | 1690–1697 | Sado-no-kami (佐渡守) | Lower 4th (従四位下) | 40,000 koku |
Kuze clan (fudai) 1697–1705
| 1 | Kuze Shigeyuki (久世重之) | 1697–1705 | Yamato-no-kami (大和守); Jijū (侍従) | Lower 4th (従四位下) | 50,000 koku |
Makino clan (fudai) 1705-1712
| 1 | Makino Nariharu (牧野成春) | 1705–1707 | Bizen-no-kami (備前守); Jijū (侍従) | Lower 4th (従四位下) | 80,000 koku |
| 2 | Makino Narinaka (牧野成央) | 1707–1712 | Bingo-no-kami (備後守) | Lower 5th (従五位下) | 80,000 koku |
Matsudaira (Nagasawa-Ōkōchi) clan (fudai) 1712–1729
| 1 | Matsudaira Nobutoki (松平信祝) | 1712–1729 | Izu-no-kami (伊豆守), Jijū (侍従) | Lower 4th (従四位下) | 70,000 koku |
Matsudaira (Honjō) clan (fudai) 1729-1749
| 1 | Matsudaira Sukenori (松平 資訓) | 1729–1749 | Bungo-no-kami (豊後守) | Lower 5th (従五位下) | 70,000 koku |
Matsudaira (Nagasawa-Ōkōchi) clan (fudai) 1752–1871
| 1 | Matsudaira Nobunao (松平信復) | 1752–1768 | Izu-no-kami (伊豆守) | Lower 5th (従五位下) | 70,000 koku |
| 2 | Matsudaira Nobuiya (松平信礼) | 1768–1770 | Izu-no-kami (伊豆守) | Lower 5th (従五位下) | 70,000 koku |
| 3 | Matsudaira Nobuakira (松平 信明) | 1770–1817 | Izu-no-kami (伊豆守) | Lower 4th (従四位下) | 70,000 koku |
| 4 | Matsudaira Nobuyori (松平信順) | 1817–1842 | Izu-no-kami (伊豆守); Jiju (伊豆守) | Lower 4th (従四位下) | 70,000 koku |
| 5 | Matsudaira Nobutomi (松平信宝) | 1842–1844 | Izu-no-kami (伊豆守) | Lower 5th (従五位下) | 70,000 koku |
| 6 | Matsudaira Nobuaki (松平信璋) | 1844–1849 | Izu-no-kami (伊豆守) | Lower 5th (従五位下) | 70,000 koku |
| 7 | Matsudaira Nobuhisa (松平 信古) | 1849–1871 | Izu-no-kami (伊豆守) | Lower 5th (従五位下) | 70,000 koku |
