= Inoue clan =

Inoue 井上氏
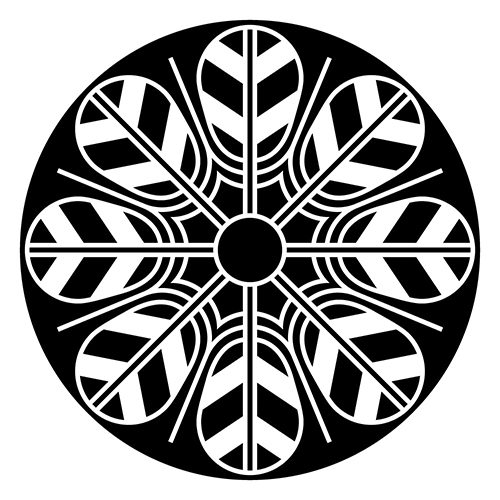
- Family crest (kamon) of main Inoue line
- Home province: Shinano Province
- Parent house: Minamoto clan (Seiwa Genji)
- Titles: daimyō, viscount
- Founder: Minamoto no Yorisue
- Final ruler: Inoue Masanao
- Ruled until: 1873 (Abolition of the han system)

The Inoue clan (井上氏, Inoue-shi) was a samurai clan which came to prominence from the late Kamakura through Edo periods in Japanese history, descending from the Seiwa Genji. Mention of an Inoue surname is found in Nara period records; however, the Inoue clan which later became prominent in the Edo period traces its antecedents to the Seiwa Genji line founded by Minamoto no Yorisue, grandson of Minamoto no Mitsunaka in the late Heian period. Minamoto no Yorisue settled in Inoue in Takai District, Shinano Province, and this was the main branch, but there were other branches in Harima, Aki and Mikawa Provinces. Under the Tokugawa shogunate, the Inoue, as hereditary vassals of the Tokugawa clan, were classified as one of the fudai daimyō clans. Following the Meiji Restoration, the clan was appointed Viscount.

== Hamamatsu branch ==
The main branch of the Inoue clan was transferred numerous times throughout the Edo period. Inoue Masanari (1577–1628), the 3rd son of Inoue Kiyohide, was made daimyō of Yokosuka Domain (53,000 koku) in Tōtōmi Province in 1623. His descendants resided at Kasama Domain, Hitachi Province in 1645, Gujo Domain in Mino Province in 1692, Kameyama Domain in Tanba Province in 1697, Shimodate Domain in Hitachi Province in 1702, back to Kasama Domain in Hitachi in 1703, and then to Iwakidaira Domain in Mutsu Province in 1747. Subsequently, they were transferred to Hamamatsu Domain in Tōtōmi Province in 1758, Tanakura Domain in Mutsu Province in 1817, Tatebayashi Domain in Kōzuke Province in 1836, back to Hamamatsu in 1845 and finally to Tsurumai Domain in Kazusa Province in 1868. The final daimyō of the main branch, Inoue Masanao (1837–1904), was made a viscount (shishaku) under the kazoku peerage system.

== Shimotsuma branch ==
A cadet branch of the Inoue clan was established in 1712 at Shimotsuma Domain, Hitachi Province by Inoue Masanaga (1654–1721), the 3rd son of Inoue Masato, daimyō of Gujō Domain in Mino Province. A minor 10,000 koku domain, it remained in the hands of the Inoue clan until the Meiji Restoration. Its final daimyō, Inoue Masaoto (1856–1921) was subsequently made a viscount.

== Takaoka branch ==
A cadet branch of the Inoue clan was established in 1649 at Takaoka Domain, Shimōsa Province by Inoue Masashige (1585–1661), a retainer of Tokugawa Ieyasu and fourth son of Inoue Kiyohide. Takaoka Domain (10,000 koku) remained in the Inoue clan until the Meiji Restoration. Its final daimyō, Inoue Masayori (1854–1904) served in the early police forces of the Meiji government and was made a viscount.
