= Rōjū =

One of the highest-ranking posts of Tokugawa Shogunate

The Rōjū (老中), usually translated as Elder, was one of the highest-ranking government posts under the Tokugawa shogunate of Edo period Japan. The term refers either to individual Elders, or to the Council of Elders as a whole; under the first two shōguns, there were only two Rōjū. The number was then increased to five, and later reduced to four. The Rōjū were usually appointed from the ranks of the fudai daimyōs with domains of between 25,000 and 50,000 koku.

== Duties ==
The Rōjū had a number of responsibilities, most clearly delineated in the 1634 ordinance that reorganized the government and created a number of new posts:

1. Relations with the Emperor, the Court, and the Prince-Abbots.
2. Supervision of those daimyō who controlled lands worth at least 10,000 koku.
3. Managing the forms taken by official documents in official communications.
4. Supervision of the internal affairs of the Shogun's domains.
5. Coinage, public works, and enfiefment.
6. Governmental relations and supervision of monk monasteries and shrines.
7. Compilation of maps, charts, and other government records.

The Rōjū served not simultaneously, but in rotation, each serving the Shogun for a month at a time, communicating with the Shogun through a chamberlain, called Soba-yōnin. However, the Rōjū also served as members of the Hyōjōsho council, along with the Ō-Metsuke and representatives of various Bugyō (Commissions or Departments). As part of the Hyōjōsho, the Rōjū sometimes served a role similar to that of a supreme court, deciding succession disputes and other such disputed matters of state and its vassals.

Under the reign of Tokugawa Tsunayoshi (1680–1709) the Rōjū lost nearly all their power, as the Shogun began to work more closely with the Tairō, Chamberlains, and others, including Yanagisawa Yoshiyasu, who held the power of a Tairō, but not the title. The Rōjū became little more than messengers, going through the motions of their proper roles as intermediaries between the Shogun and other offices, but not being able to exercise any power to change or decide policy. As Arai Hakuseki, a major Confucian poet and politician of the time wrote, "All the Rōjū did was to pass on his [Yoshiyasu's] instructions" (Sansom 141). Even after Tsunayoshi's death, the Rōjū did not regain their former power. They continued to exist, however, as a government post and a council with, officially if not in fact, all the powers and responsibilities they originally held, through the Edo period.

== List of Rōjū ==
Each office-holder is listed once. Some may have served under multiple shōguns, and as a result of multiple terms, the list may not fully accurate reflect the order in which the office was held. For example, Hotta Masayoshi served in 1857–58 after Abe Masahiro (1843–57), but also served earlier, and is listed earlier; he is not also listed after Abe.

=== Under Tokugawa Ieyasu ===
- Ōkubo Tadachika (大久保忠隣)(1593–1614)
- Ōkubo Nagayasu (大久保長安)(1600–1613)
- Sakakibara Yasumasa (榊原康政)(1600–1606)
- Honda Masanobu (本多正信)(1600–1615)
- Naruse Masanari (成瀬正成)(1600–1616)
- Andō Naotsugu (安藤直次)(1600–1616)
- Honda Masazumi (本多正純)(1600–1622)
- Naitō Kiyonari (内藤清成)(1601–1606)
- Aoyama Tadanari (青山忠成)(1601–1606)

=== Under Tokugawa Hidetada ===
- Aoyama Narishige (青山成重)(1608–1613)
- Sakai Tadatoshi (酒井忠利)(1609–1627)
- Sakai Tadayo (酒井忠世)(1610–1634)
- Doi Toshikatsu (土井利勝)(1610–1638)
- Andō Shigenobu (安藤重信)(1611–1621)
- Naitō Kiyotsugu (内藤清次)(1616–1617)
- Aoyama Tadatoshi (青山忠俊)(1616–1623)
- Inoue Masanari (井上正就)(1617–1628)
- Nagai Naomasa (永井尚政)(1622–1633)

=== Under Tokugawa Iemitsu ===
- Abe Masatsugu (阿部正次)(1623–1626)
- Inaba Masakatsu (稲葉正勝)(1623–1634)
- Naitō Tadashige (内藤忠重)(1623–1633)
- Sakai Tadakatsu (酒井忠勝)(1624–1638)
- Morikawa Shigetoshi (森川重俊)(1628–1632)
- Aoyama Yukinari (青山幸成)(1628–1633)
- Matsudaira Nobutsuna (松平信綱)(1632–1662)
- Abe Tadaaki (阿部忠秋)(1633–1666)
- Hotta Masamori (堀田正盛)(1635–1651)
- Abe Shigetsugu (阿部重次)(1638–1651)
- Matsudaira Norinaga (松平乗寿)(1642–1654)

=== Under Tokugawa Ietsuna ===
- Sakai Tadakiyo (酒井忠清)(1653–1666)
- Inaba Masanori (稲葉正則)(1657–1681)
- Kuze Hiroyuki (久世広之)(1663–1679)
- Itakura Shigenori (板倉重矩)(1665–1668, 1670–1673)
- Tsuchiya Kazunao (土屋数直)(1665–1679)
- Abe Masayoshi (阿部正能)(1673–1676)
- Ōkubo Tadatomo (大久保忠朝)(1677–1698)
- Hotta Masatoshi (堀田正俊)(1679–1681)
- Doi Toshifusa (土井利房)(1679–1681)
- Itakura Shigetane (板倉重種)(1680–1681)

=== Under Tokugawa Tsunayoshi ===
- Toda Tadamasa (戸田忠昌)(1681–1699)
- Abe Masatake (阿部正武)(1681–1704)
- Matsudaira Nobuyuki (松平信之)(1685–1686)
- Tsuchiya Masanao (土屋政直)(1687–1718)
- Ogasawara Nagashige (小笠原長重)(1697–1705, 1709–1710)
- Akimoto Takatomo (秋元喬知)(1699–1707)
- Inaba Masamichi (稲葉正往)(1701–1707)
- Honda Masanaga (本多正永)(1704–1711)
- Ōkubo Tadamasu (大久保忠増)(1705–1713)
- Inoue Masamine (井上正岑)(1705–1722)

=== Under Tokugawa Ienobu and Ietsugu ===
- Abe Masataka (阿部正喬)(1711–1717)
- Kuze Shigeyuki (久世重之)(1713–1720)
- Matsudaira Nobutsune (松平信庸)(1714–1716)
- Toda Tadazane (戸田忠真)(1714–1729)

=== Under Tokugawa Yoshimune ===
- Mizuno Tadayuki (水野忠之)(1717–1730)
- Andō Nobutomo (安藤信友)(1722–1732)
- Matsudaira Norisato (松平乗邑)(1723–1745)
- Matsudaira Tadachika (松平忠周)(1724–1728)
- Ōkubo Tsuneharu (大久保常春)(1728)
- Sakai Tadaoto (酒井忠音)(1728–1735)
- Matsudaira Nobutoki (松平信祝)(1730–1744)
- Matsudaira Terusada (松平輝貞)(1730–1745)
- Kuroda Naokuni (黒田直邦)(1732–1735)
- Honda Tadanaga (本多忠良)(1734–1746).
- Toki Yoritoshi (土岐頼稔)(1742–1744)
- Sakai Tadazumi (酒井忠恭)(1744–1749)
- Matsudaira Norikata (松平乗賢)(1745–1746)
- Hotta Masasuke (堀田正亮)(1745–1761)

=== Under Tokugawa Ieshige ===
- Nishio Tadanao (西尾忠尚)(1746–1760)
- Honda Masayoshi (本多正珍)(1746–1758)
- Matsudaira Takechika (松平武元)(1746–1779)
- Sakai Tadayori (酒井忠寄)(1749–1764)
- Matsudaira Terutaka (松平輝高)(1758–1781)
- Inoue Masatsune (井上正経)(1760–1763)
- Akimoto Sumitomo (秋元凉朝)(1747–1764, 1765–1767)

=== Under Tokugawa Ieharu ===
- Matsudaira Yasutoshi (松平康福)(1762–1788)
- Abe Masasuke (阿部正右)(1764–1769)
- Itakura Katsukiyo (板倉勝清)(1769–1780)
- Tanuma Okitsugu (田沼意次)(1769–1786)
- Abe Masachika (阿部正允)(1780)
- Kuze Hiroakira (久世広明)(1781–1785)
- Mizuno Tadatomo (水野忠友)(1781–1788, 1796–1802)
- Torii Tadaoki (鳥居忠意)(1781–1793)
- Makino Sadanaga (牧野貞長)(1784–1790)

=== Under Tokugawa Ienari ===
- Abe Masatomo (阿部正倫)(1787–1788)
- Matsudaira Sadanobu (松平定信)(1787–1793)
- Matsudaira Nobuakira (松平信明)(1788–1803, 1806–1817)
- Matsudaira Norisada (松平乗完)(1789–1793)
- Honda Tadakazu (本多忠籌)(1790–1798)
- Toda Ujinori (戸田氏教)(1790–1806)
- Ōta Sukeyoshi (太田資愛)(1793–1801)
- Andō Nobunari (安藤信成)(1793–1810)
- Makino Tadakiyo (牧野忠精)(1801–1816, 1828–1831)
- Doi Toshiatsu (土井利厚)(1802–1822)
- Aoyama Tadahiro (青山忠裕)(1804–1835)
- Matsudaira Noriyasu (松平乗保)(1810–1826)
- Sakai Tadayuki (酒井忠進)(1815–1828)
- Mizuno Tadanari (水野忠成)(1817–1834)
- Abe Masakiyo (阿部正精)(1817–1823)
- Ōkubo Tadazane (大久保忠真)(1818–1837)
- Matsudaira Norihiro (松平乗寛)(1822–1839)
- Matsudaira Terunobu (松平輝延)(1823–1825)
- Uemura Ienaga (植村家長)(1825–1828)
- Matsudaira Yasutō (松平康任)(1826–1835)
- Mizuno Tadakuni (水野忠邦)(1828–1843, 1844–1845)
- Matsudaira Muneakira (松平宗発)(1831–1840)
- Ōta Sukemoto (太田資始)(1834–1841, 1858–1859, 1863)
- Wakisaka Yasutada (脇坂安董)(1836–1841)
- Matsudaira Nobuyori (松平信順)(1837)
- Hotta Masayoshi (堀田正睦)(1837–1843, 1855–1858)

=== Under Tokugawa Ieyoshi ===
- Doi Toshitsura (土井利位)(1838–1844)
- Inoue Masaharu (井上正春)(1840–1843)
- Manabe Akikatsu (間部詮勝)(1840–1843, 1858–1859)
- Sanada Yukitsura (真田幸貫)(1841–1844)
- Hori Chikashige (堀親寚)(1843–1845)
- Toda Tadaharu (戸田忠温)(1843–1851)
- Makino Tadamasa (牧野忠雅)(1843–1857)
- Abe Masahiro (阿部正弘)(1843–1857)
- Aoyama Tadanaga (青山忠良)(1844–1848)
- Matsudaira Noriyasu (松平乗全)(1845–1855, 1858–1860)
- Matsudaira Tadakata (松平忠優)(1848–1855, 1857–1858)
- Kuze Hirochika (久世広周)(1851–1858, 1860–1862)
- Naitō Nobuchika (内藤信親)(1851–1862)

=== Under Tokugawa Iesada ===
- Wakisaka Yasuori (脇坂安宅)(1857–1860, 1862)

=== Under Tokugawa Iemochi and Yoshinobu ===
- Andō Nobumasa (安藤信正)(1860–1862)
- Honda Tadamoto (本多忠民)(1860–1862, 1864–1865)
- Matsudaira Nobuyoshi (松平信義)(1860–1863)
- Ogasawara Nagamichi (小笠原長行)(1862–1863, 1865, 1866–1868)
- Itakura Katsukiyo (板倉勝静)(1862–1864, 1865–1868)
- Inoue Masanao (井上正直)(1862–1864)
- Mizuno Tadakiyo (水野忠精)(1862–1866)
- Sakai Tadashige (酒井忠績)(1863–1864)
- Arima Michizumi (有馬道純)(1863–1864)
- Makino Tadayuki (牧野忠恭)(1863–1865)
- Matsumae Takahiro (松前崇広)(1864–1865)
- Abe Masato (阿部正外)(1864–1865)
- Suwa Tadamasa (諏訪忠誠)(1864–1865)
- Inaba Masakuni (稲葉正邦)(1864–1865, 1866–1868)
- Matsudaira Munehide (松平宗秀)(1864–1866)
- Inoue Masanao (井上正直)(1865–1867)
- Matsudaira Yasuhide (松平康英)(1865–1868)
- Mizuno Tadanobu (水野忠誠)(1866)
- Matsudaira Norikata (松平乗謨)(1866–1868)
- Inaba Masami (稲葉正巳)(1866–1868)
- Matsudaira Sadaaki (松平定昭)(1867)
- Ōkōchi Masatada (大河内正質)(1867–1868)
- Sakai Tadatō (酒井忠惇)(1867–1868)
- Tachibana Taneyuki (立花種恭)(1868)
