= Osaka-jō dai =

Former officials of Edo shogunate, Japan

Ōsaka-jō dai (大坂城代) were officials of the Tokugawa shogunate in Edo period Japan. Those appointed to this prominent office were exclusively fudai daimyō. Conventional interpretations have construed these Japanese titles as "commissioner" or "overseer" or "governor".

== History ==
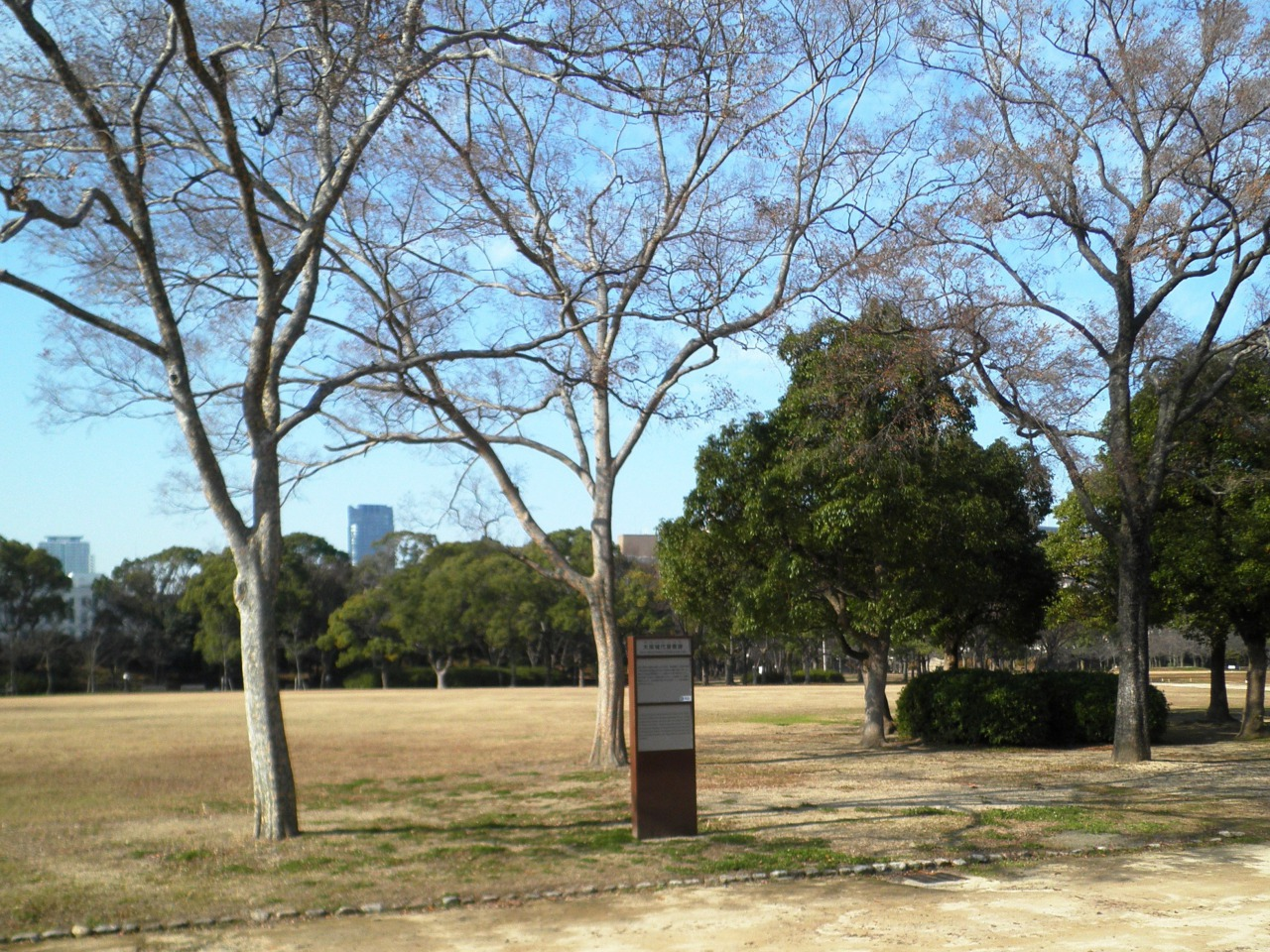
Site of the Osaka Castle dai's residence at Osaka Castle's Nishinomaru

This bakufu title identifies an official responsible for holding and defending Osaka Castle (大坂城・大阪城, Ōsaka-jō), and for administration of the city of Osaka. This office was considered only slightly less important than the Kyoto shoshidai; and this important daimyō officer was charged with guarding the security of the Kansai region. Originally, there were six jōdai, but that number was eventually reduced to only one. Conventionally, the person appointed to this essential position would have previously demonstrated his abilities and loyalty by serving as jisha-bugyō or by having succeeded in another similarly important role. From this high position, a career path would have typically included promotion to the office of Kyoto shoshidai and then to a position amongst the rōjū in Edo.

The residence of the jōdai was located at Osaka Castle's Nishinomaru. It was a large shoin palace and the second largest one after the Honmaru Palace. It was lost in a fire by the Meiji era.

== Shogunal city ==
During this period, Osaka ranked with other urban centers, some of which were designated as a "shogunal city". The number of such cities rose from three to eleven under Tokugawa administration.

== List of Osaka Castle dai ==
- Naitō Nobumasa (1619-1626)
- Mizuno Tadakuni (1825)
- Matsudaira Noryasu (1845)
- Matsudaira Tadakata (1845–1848)
- Naitō Nobuchika (1848–1850)
- Matsudaira Nobuatsu (1858–1861)
- Honjō Munehide (1861–1862)

== See also ==
- Bugyō
