= Sōshaban =

Sōshaban (奏者番, also Sōjaban) were officials of the Tokugawa shogunate in Edo period Japan. Conventional interpretations have construed this Japanese title as "master of ceremonies"

Created in 1632, this bakufu title identified an official selected from the ranks of the daimyōs whose responsibility was to formally introduce hatamoto and other daimyōs to the shōgun during audiences, to read aloud the list of presents received by the shōgun from the various domains during New Year's and other ceremonial occasions, and in general to regulate the details of these ceremonies. The title was initially assigned to two daimyōs, but was subsequently increased to up to twenty-four, who performed their duties in rotation. The Sōshaban were also responsible for managing the guard of Edo Castle at night. After 1658, the four Jisha-bugyō came to be selected from the ranks of the Sōshaban, who continued to hold their original title concurrently; the title was also restricted to the ranks of the fudai daimyō. The title was suppressed in 1862.

== See also ==
- Bugyō
