= Nishio (surname) =

Nishio (written: 西尾) is a Japanese surname. Notable people with the surname include:

- Akira Nishio (西尾 明; born 1979), Japanese shogi player
- Daisuke Nishio (西尾 大介; born 1959), Japanese animator and director
- Esther Takei Nishio (1925–2019), Japanese-American internee
- Etsuko Nishio (西尾 悦子; born 1973), Japanese singer, actress and model
- Hiroshi Nishio (西尾 孔志; born 1974), Japanese film director, animator and writer
- Kanji Nishio (西尾 幹二; 1935–2024), Japanese academic
- Linda Nishio (born 1952), Japanese-American artist
- Mari Nishio (西尾 まり; born 1974), Japanese actress
- Masanori Nishio (西尾 正範; born 1949), Japanese politician
- Ryuya Nishio (西尾 隆矢; born 2001), Japanese footballer
- Shoji Nishio (西尾 昭二; 1927–2005), Japanese aikidoka
- Shojiro Nishio (西尾 章治郎), Japanese computer scientist
- Nishio Tadaatsu (西尾 忠篤; 1850–1910), Japanese daimyō
- Nishio Tadakata (西尾 忠固; 1811–1857), Japanese daimyō
- Nishio Tadamitsu (西尾 忠需; 1716–1760), Japanese daimyō
- Nishio Tadanao (西尾 忠尚; 1689–1760), Japanese daimyō
- Nishio Tadanari (西尾 忠成; 1653–1713), Japanese daimyō
- Nishio Tadasaka (西尾 忠受; 1821–1861), Japanese daimyō
- Nishio Tadateru (西尾 忠照; 1613–1654), Japanese daimyō
- Nishio Tadayoshi (西尾 忠善; 1768–1831), Japanese daimyō
- Nishio Tadayuki (西尾 忠移; 1749–1801), Japanese daimyō
- Tetsuya Nishio (西尾 鉄也; born 1968), Japanese animator and character designer
- Toku Nishio (西尾 徳; 1939–2005), Japanese actor and voice actor
- Toshizō Nishio (西尾 寿造; 1881–1960), Japanese general
