= Nishio Tadakata =

Japanese daimyō

Nishio Tadakata 西尾忠固
- Born: 1811; Edo, Japan
- Died: June 18, 1857 (aged 45–46); Yokosuka Domain, Japan
- Occupation: daimyō
- Spouse: daughter of Matsudaira Muneakira

Nishio Tadakata (西尾 忠固; 1811 – June 18, 1857) was a daimyō in late-Edo period Japan, who ruled Yokosuka Domain in Tōtōmi Province.

Tadakata was the fourth son of Nishio Tadayoshi, and succeeded his father as head of the Nishio clan and daimyō of Yokosuka in 1829. His wife was a daughter of Matsudaira Muneakira, daimyō of Miyazu Domain in Tango Province, but he had no children. He retired due to illness in 1843, yielding the clan leadership to his adopted son Tadasaka. Tadakata died in Yokosuka Castle on June 18, 1857, at age 47. His grave is located at the Nishio clan temple of Ryumin-ji in modern Kakegawa, Shizuoka.

Preceded by Nishio Tadayoshi	Daimyō of Yokosuka; 1829-1843	Succeeded by Nishio Tadasaka
