= Kaminoyama Castle =

Hirayama-style Japanese castle in Kaminoyama, Japan

- 上山城
- Kaminoyama, Yamagata Prefecture, Japan
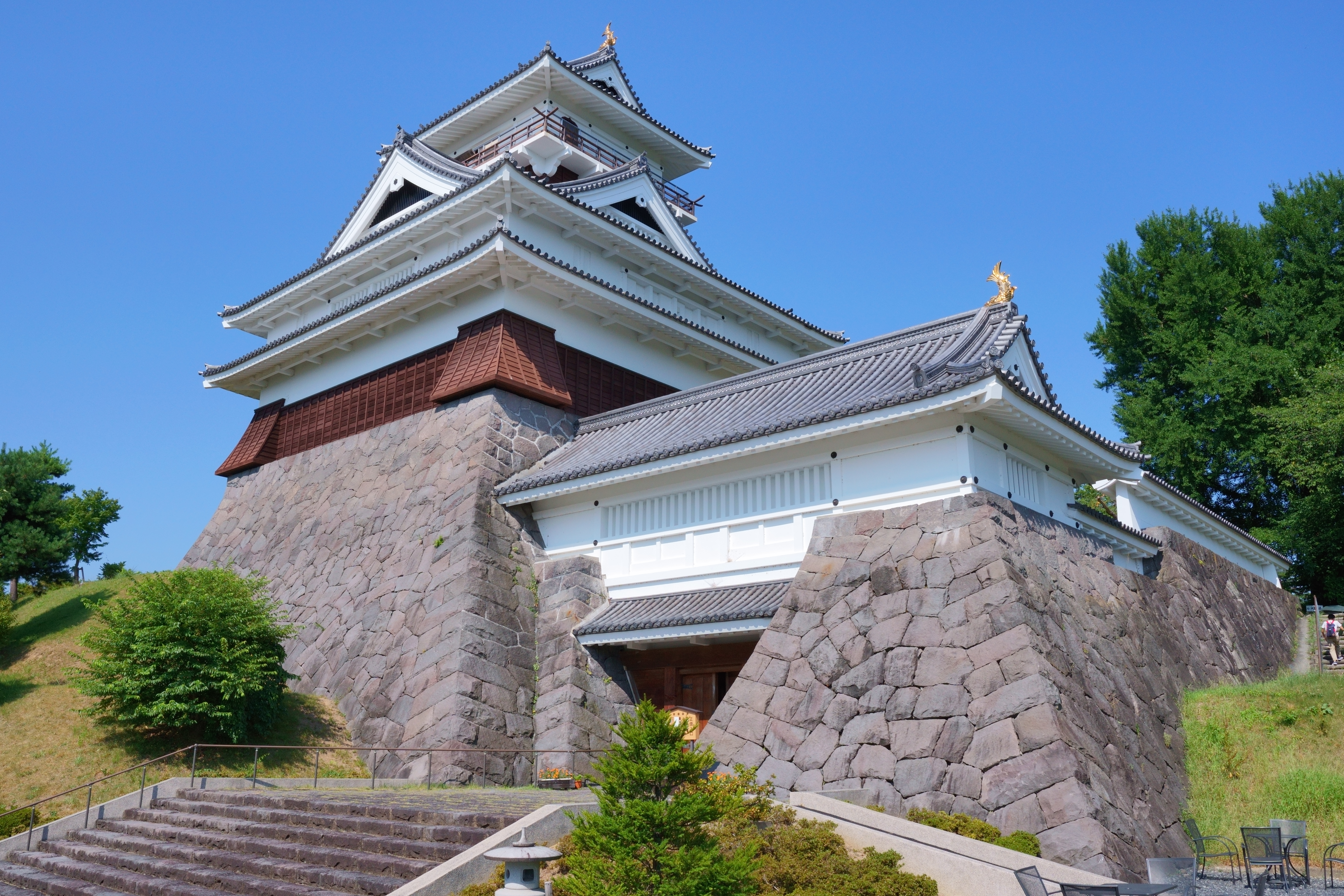
- Reconstructed keep of Kaminoyama Castle

Site information
- Type: hirayama-style Japanese castle
- Open to the public: yes
- Condition: reconstructed 1982

Location
- Location within Yamagata Prefecture Location within Japan
- Coordinates: 38°09′27″N 140°16′34″E

Site history
- Built: 1535
- Built by: Takenaga Yoshitada
- In use: Edo period
- Demolished: 1872

Kaminoyama Castle (上山城, Kaminoyama-jō) is a hirayama-style Japanese castle located in the center of the city of Kaminoyama, eastern Yamagata Prefecture, Japan. Throughout the Edo period, Kaminoyama Castle was the headquarters for the daimyō of Kaminoyama Domain. The castle was also known as Tsukioka Castle (月岡城, Tsukioka-jō).

Tsukioka Shrine is a Shinto shrine located in Kaminoyama Castle, Yamagata Prefecture.

== History ==
The first castle on this site dates to the early Muromachi period, when the area was under the control of the Tendō clan. The area was contested between the Mogami clan and the Date clan, changing hands several times. The foundations of the present castle were built by Takenaga Yoshitada, a retainer of the Mogami, in 1535. However, after the establishment of the Tokugawa shogunate, the Mogami were dispossessed, and a new 40,000 koku domain, Kaminoyama Domain was created. Thereafter the castle and Kaminoyama Domain passed through a number of daimyō clans, often for only a generation or two, and its revenues were often reduced. Under the Toki clan, a donjon was built, but it was destroyed when the clan was transferred elsewhere in 1692. In 1697, the castle came under the control of the Fujii branch of the Matsudaira clan, which continued to rule over Kaminoyama Domain until the Meiji restoration.

With the abolition of the han system in 1871, Kaminoyama Domain became Kaminoyama Prefecture, and in 1872 the castle grounds were sold to the government and turned into a park.

In 1982, on the site of the second bailey, a reconstruction of a "typical" Edo period castle tower was constructed out of concrete to serve as a tourist attraction and to contain a local history museum.

== Literature ==
- De Lange, William (2021). An Encyclopedia of Japanese Castles. Groningen: Toyo Press. pp. 600 pages. ISBN 978-9492722300.
- Schmorleitz, Morton S. (1974). Castles in Japan. Tokyo: Charles E. Tuttle Co. pp. 144–145. ISBN 0-8048-1102-4.
- Motoo, Hinago (1986). Japanese Castles. Tokyo: Kodansha. p. 200 pages. ISBN 0-87011-766-1.
- Mitchelhill, Jennifer (2004). Castles of the Samurai: Power and Beauty. Tokyo: Kodansha. p. 112 pages. ISBN 4-7700-2954-3.
- Turnbull, Stephen (2003). Japanese Castles 1540-1640. Osprey Publishing. p. 64 pages. ISBN 1-84176-429-9.
