= Yokosuka Domain =

Yokosuka Domain 横須賀藩
- under Tokugawa shogunate Japan
- 1601–1868
- Capital: Yokosuka Castle
- Area
  - Coordinates: 34°41′8″N 137°58′16″E
  - Type: Daimyō
- Historical era: Edo period
  - Established: 1601
  - Disestablished: 1868
- Today part of: part of Shizuoka Prefecture

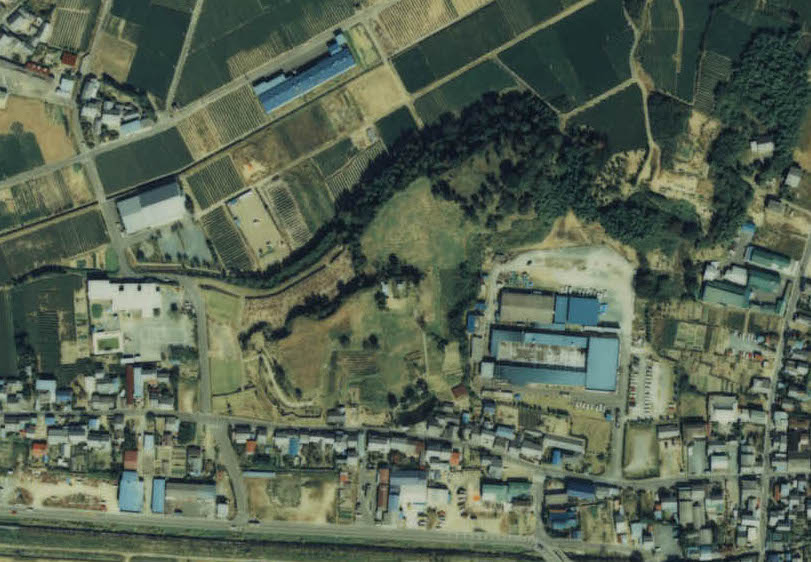
Yokosuka Castle

Yokosuka Domain (横須賀藩, Yokosuka-han) was a feudal domain under the Tokugawa shogunate of Edo period Japan, located in Tōtōmi Province. It was centered at Yokosuka Castle in what is now the Matsuo district of the city of Kakegawa in Shizuoka Prefecture.

== History ==
In February 1601, Ōsuga Tadamasa, lord of Kururi Domain in Kazusa Province, was allowed by Tokugawa Ieyasu to return to his ancestral estates in Tōtōmi, and was granted the status of a 55,000 koku daimyō. Ōsuga Tadamasa was the son of the Castellan of Yokosuka Castle and had been relocated by Toyotomi Hideyoshi along with Ieyasu to the Kantō region. During the unsettled period following Hideyoshi’s death, Ōsuga Tadamasa developed a reputation for his upright leadership, and was a strong supporter of Ieyasu. However, his son succeeded to Tatebayashi Domain (110,000 koku) in Kōzuke Province, and Yokosuka Domain reverted to tenryō status in December 1615.

In October 1619, Matsudaira Shigekatsu was transferred from Sekiyado Domain in Shimōsa Province and assigned revenues of 26,000 koku at Yokosuka. His son, Matsudaira Shigetada, former castellan of Sumpu Castle became daimyō in 1621, and had his revenues increased to 40,000 koku before being transferred to Kaminoyama Domain in Dewa Province the following year.

Yokosuka Domain was assigned next to rōjū Inoue Masanari, with revenues now set at 52,500 koku. His son, Inoue Masatoshi inherited only 47,500 koku in 1628, with the remaining 5,000 koku assigned to his younger brother. However, he was rewarded with 2,500 koku by Shōgun Tokugawa Iemitsu for his role in the Tokugawa Tadanaga affair, and was thus ranked as 50,000 koku daimyō when he was transferred to Kasama Domain in Hitachi Province in 1645.

The next inhabitant of Yokosuka Castle was Honda Toshinaga, formerly daimyō of Okazaki Domain in Owari Province. Honda proved to be a very unpopular ruler, spending prolifically on prostitutes and sake, ignoring matters of governance, imprisoning or executing his advisors and establishing a network of spies and informers throughout the domain. After severely increasing taxes and issuing a series of 100 repressive ordinances in 1682, the domain was struck by a typhoon, after which the population rose in revolt. Honda was arrested by officials from the Tokugawa Shogunate and imprisoned within Edo Castle, where he was charged with 23 charges of official misconduct. However, he was later pardoned, and assigned to Murayama Domain in Dewa Province (10,000 koku).

Following this incident, Yokosuka Domain was assigned to Nishio Tadanari, formerly of Komoro Domain, Shinano Province, whose family ruled for the next eight generations until the Meiji Restoration.

The domain had a population of 2,644 people per the Kyōhō period (1716-1735) census, which decreased to 2525 people per the Keiō period (1865-1867) census. The domain maintained its primary residence (kamiyashiki) in Edo at Soto-Sakura, in what is now Kasumigaseki, Tokyo.

During the Bakumatsu period, the eighth (and final) daimyō, Nishio Tadaatsu, initially attempted to remain neutral, but later contributed his forces to the imperial armies. In February 1869, he was transferred by the new Meiji government to the short-lived Hanabusa Domain in Awa Province and Yokosuka Domain was absorbed into the new Shizuoka Domain created for retired ex-Shōgun Tokugawa Yoshinobu. .

== Holdings at the end of the Edo period ==
As with most domains in the han system, Yokosuka Domain consisted of several discontinuous territories calculated to provide the assigned kokudaka, based on periodic cadastral surveys and projected agricultural yields.

- Tōtōmi Province
  - 66 villages in Kitō District
  - 9 villages in Saya District
  - 6 villages in Shūchi District
  - 17 villages in Yamane District
- Suruga Province
  - 13 villages in Shida District

== List of daimyō ==
#	Name	Tenure	Courtesy title	Court Rank	kokudaka
Ōsuga clan, 1601-1619 (fudai)
1	Ōsuga Tadamasa (大須賀忠政)	1601–1607	Dewa-no-kami (出羽守)	Junior 5th Rank, Lower Grade (従五位下)	60,000 koku
2	Sakakibara (Ōsuga) Tadatsugu (榊原忠次)	1607–1615	Shikibu-Ōi-no-suke (式部大輔); Jijū (侍従)	Junior 4th Rank, Lower Grade (従四位下)	26,000 koku
Matsudaira (Nomi) clan, 1619-1622 (fudai)
1	Matsudaira Shigekatsu (松平重勝)	1619–1621	Ōsumi-no-kami (大隈守)	Junior 5th Rank, Lower Grade (従五位下)	26,000 koku
2	Matsudaira Shigetada (松平重忠)	1621–1622	Tango-no-kami (丹後守)	Junior 5th Rank, Lower Grade (従五位下)	26,000 koku
Inoue clan, 1622-1645 (fudai; 52,000)
1	Inoue Masanari (井上正就)	1622–1629	Kazue-no-kami (主計頭)	Junior 5th Rank, Lower Grade (従五位下)	52,500 koku
2	Inoue Masatoshi (井上正利)	1628–1645	Kawachi-no-kami (河内守)	Junior 5th Rank, Lower Grade (従五位下)	50,000 koku
Honda clan, 1645-1682 (fudai)
1	Honda Toshinaga (本多利長)	1645–1681	Echizen-no-kami (越前守)	Junior 5th Rank, Lower Grade (従五位下)	40,000 koku
Nishio clan, 1682-1868 (fudai)
1	Nishio Tadanari (西尾忠成)	1682–1713	Oki-no-kami (隠岐守)	Junior 5th Rank, Lower Grade (従五位下)	25,000 koku
2	Nishio Tadanao (西尾忠尚)	1713–1760	Oki-no-kami (隠岐守); Jijū (侍従)	Junior 4th Rank, Lower Grade (従四位下)	35,000 koku
3	Nishio Tadamitsu (西尾忠需)	1760–1782	Mondo-no-shō (主水正)	Junior 4th Rank, Lower Grade (従四位下)	35,000 koku
4	Nishio Tadayuki (西尾忠移)	1782–1801	Oki-no-kami (隠岐守)	Junior 5th Rank, Lower Grade (従五位下)	35,000 koku
5	Nishio Tadayoshi (西尾忠善)	1801–1829	Oki-no-kami	Junior 5th Rank, Lower Grade (従五位下)	35,000 koku
6	Nishio Tadakata (西尾忠固)	1829–1843	Oki-no-kami (隠岐守)	Junior 5th Rank, Lower Grade (従五位下)	35,000 koku
7	Nishio Tadasaka (西尾忠受)	1843–1861	Oki-no-kami (隠岐守)	Junior 5th Rank, Lower Grade (従五位下)	35,000 koku
8	Nishio Tadaatsu (西尾忠篤)	1861–1868	Oki-no-kami (隠岐守)	Viscount	35,000 koku

== See also ==
- List of Han
