= Matsudaira Nobutsune =

Matsudaira Nobutsune may refer to:

- Matsudaira Nobutsune (Sasayama) (1666–1717), Rōjū and daimyō of Sasayama Domain
- Matsudaira Nobutsune (Kaminoyama) (1844–1918), daimyō of Kaminoyama Domain

See also:

- Matsudaira Nobutsuna
