= Tadamitsu =

- Gender: Male

Origin
- Origin: Japanese
- Meaning: Different meanings depending on the kanji used

Tadamitsu (written: 忠光, 忠晃, 忠三 or 忠需) is a masculine Japanese given name. Notable people with the name include:

- Daitetsu Tadamitsu (大徹 忠晃; born 1956), Japanese sumo wrestler
- Tadamitsu Fujii (藤井 忠光; born 1954), Japanese ice hockey player
- Tadamitsu Kishimoto (岸本 忠三; born 1939), Japanese immunologist
- Nishio Tadamitsu (西尾 忠需; 1716–1760), Japanese daimyō
