= Toshinaga =

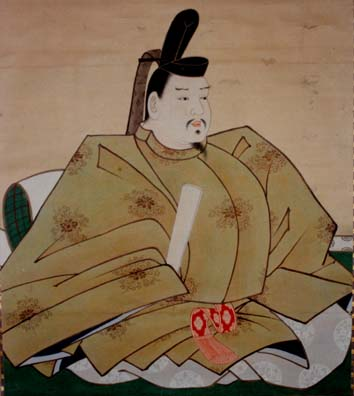
- Toshinaga Maeda (1562–1614), Japanese daimyō
- Pronunciation: toɕinaga (IPA)
- Gender: Male

Origin
- Origin: Japanese
- Meaning: Different meanings depending on the kanji used

Other names
- Alternative spelling: Tosinaga (Kunrei-shiki) Tosinaga (Nihon-shiki) Toshinaga (Hepburn)

Toshinaga is a masculine Japanese given name.

== Written forms ==
Toshinaga can be written using different combinations of kanji characters. Some examples:

- 敏永, "agile, eternity"
- 敏長, "agile, long/leader"
- 俊永, "talented, eternity"
- 俊長, "talented, long/leader"
- 利永, "benefit, eternity"
- 利長, "benefit, long/leader"
- 年永, "year, eternity"
- 年長, "year, long/leader"
- 寿永, "long life, eternity"
- 寿長, "long life, long/leader"

The name can also be written in hiragana としなが or katakana トシナガ.

== Notable people with the name ==
- Toshinaga Honda (本多 利長, 1635–1693), Japanese daimyō.
- Toshinaga Maeda (前田 利長, 1562–1614), Japanese daimyō.
- Toshinaga Saito (斎藤 利永, ????–1460), Japanese daimyō.
