= Shigetada =

- Gender: Male

Origin
- Origin: Japanese
- Meaning: Different meanings depending on the kanji used

Shigetada (written: 重忠 or 重格) is a masculine Japanese given name. Notable people with the name include:

- Hatakeyama Shigetada (畠山 重忠) (1164–1205), Japanese samurai
- Matsudaira Shigetada (松平 重忠) (1570–1626), Japanese daimyō
- Shigetada Morishita (森下 重格), Japanese mayor
- Shigetada Nishijima (西嶋 重忠) (1911-2006), Japanese scholar, spy, and lobbyist
- Shigetada Nakanishi (中西 重忠) (born 1942), Japanese biochemist and neuroscientist
- Sakai Shigetada (酒井 重忠) (1549-1617), Japanese daimyō and father of Sakai Tadayo (酒井 忠世) (1572-1636)
