= Yoita Domain =

Fudai feudal domain under the Tokugawa shogunate

Yoita Domain 与板藩
- under Tokugawa shogunate Japan
- 1634–1871
- Capital: Yoita jin'ya
- Area
  - Coordinates: 37°32′39″N 138°48′41″E
- Government
  - Type: Daimyō
- Historical era: Edo period
  - Established: 1634
  - Disestablished: 1871
- Today part of: Niigata Prefecture

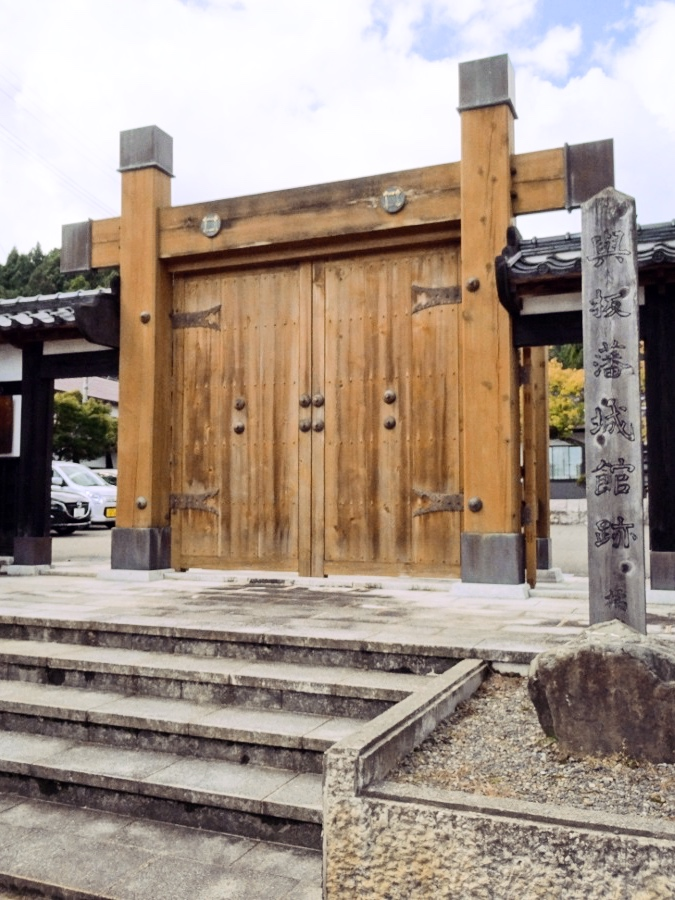
Gate of the Yoita Jin'ya

Yoita Domain (与板藩, Yoita-han) was a fudai feudal domain under the Tokugawa shogunate of Edo period Japan. It was located in Echigo Province, Honshū. The domain was centered at Yoita Jin'ya, located in what is now part of the city of Nagaoka in Niigata Prefecture.

== History ==
Yoita Domain began as a 10,000 koku holding created in 1634 for Makino Yasunari (1617–1658), a younger son of Makino Tadanari, 1st daimyō of Nagaoka Domain. The site of Yoita Jin'ya was the former residence of Uesugi Kagekatsu's senior retainer. Naoe Kanetsugu. The Makino ruled for three generations, and were transferred to Komoro Domain in Shinano Province in 1689. The territory reverted for a brief period to tenryō status from 1689-1705.

In 1705, Ii Naotomo, daimyō of Kakegawa Domain refused to participate in the mandatory sankin-kōtai to Edo, and was relieved of his office by the shogunate due to mental illness. Normally, this would have been cause for attainder, but the shogunate took into account the role of the Ii clan in the early days of the shogunate, and allowed his adopted son, Ii Naonori to inherit, albeit with a reduction in kokudaka from 35,000 to 20,000 koku. The following year Naonori was transferred from Kakegawa to Yoita, which lacked the status of a "castle-holding domain".

This cadet branch of the Ii clan continued to rule Yoita until the Meiji restoration.

During the Boshin War, the domain initially sided with the imperial side, but as it was a small domain wedged in between the powerful domains of Nagaoka and Aizu, both of whom were strongly pro-Tokugawa, Yoita was strongly pressured towards an alliance with Nagaoka. Ii Naoyasu refused, and pledged fealty to the imperial side at Takada. The domain was ordered to supply 10,000 ryō of gold and 500 bales of rice to support the imperial armies, but was able to raise only 7000 ryō. Yoita resisted sending its own forces to fight in the Boshin War until the battle against Shōnai Domain, at which time it contributed 166 troops out of a samurai population of 253. In July 1871, with the abolition of the han system, Yoita Domain briefly became Yoita Prefecture, which was merged with Kashiwazaki Prefecture a few months later, and then merged into the newly created Niigata Prefecture. Under the new Meiji government, Ii Naoyasu was given the kazoku peerage title of shishaku (viscount), and later served as a member of the House of Peers.

== Bakumatsu period holdings ==
As with most domains in the han system, Yoita Domain consisted of several discontinuous territories calculated to provide the assigned kokudaka, based on periodic cadastral surveys and projected agricultural yields.

- Echigo Province
  - 13 villages in Kariwa District
  - 33 villages in Santō District
  - 25 villages in Kanbara District

== List of daimyō ==
| # | Name | Tenure | Courtesy title | Court Rank | kokudaka | Notes |
|---|---|---|---|---|---|---|
Makino clan (fudai) 1634-1689
| 1 | Makino Yasunari (牧野康成) | 1634-1657 | Naizen-no-kami (内膳正) | Junior 5th Rank, Lower Grade (従五位下) | 10,000 koku | |
| 2 | Makino Yasumichi (牧野康道) | 1657-1689 | Tōtōmi-no-kami (遠江守) | Junior 5th Rank, Lower Grade (従五位下) | 10,000 koku | |
| 3 | Makino Yasushige (牧野康重) | 1689-1696 | Suo-no-kami (周防守) | Junior 5th Rank, Lower Grade (従五位下) | 10,000 koku | transfer to Komoro |
tenryō 1696-1705
Ii clan (fudai) 1705-1868
| 1 | Ii Naonori (井伊直矩) | 1706-1731 | Hyōbu-no-shō (兵部少輔) | Junior 5th Rank, Lower Grade (従五位下) | 20,000 koku | transfer from Kakegawa |
| 2 | Ii Naoharu (井伊直陽) | 1731-1732 | Tamba-no-kami (丹波守) | Junior 5th Rank, Lower Grade (従五位下) | 20,000 koku | |
| 3 | Ii Naokazu (井伊直員) | 11732-1735 | Hōki-no-kami (伯耆守) | Junior 5th Rank, Lower Grade (従五位下) | 20,000 koku | |
| 4 | Ii Naoari (井伊直存) | 1735-1760 | Iga-no-kami (伊賀守) | Junior 5th Rank, Lower Grade (従五位下) | 20,000 koku | |
| 5 | Ii Naokuni (井伊直郡) | 1760-1760 | -none- | -none- | 20,000 koku | |
| 6 | Ii Naoakira (井伊直朗) | 1761-1819 | Ukyō-no-taifu (右京大夫) | Junior 4th Rank, Lower Grade (従四位下) | 20,000 koku | |
| 7 | Ii Naoteru (井伊直朗) | 1820-1826 | Kunai-no-shō (宮内少輔) | Junior 5th Rank, Lower Grade (従五位下) | 20,000 koku | |
| 8 | Ii Naotsune (井伊直経) | 1827-1856 | Hyōbu-no-shō (兵部少輔) | Junior 5th Rank, Lower Grade (従五位下) | 20,000 koku | |
| 9 | Ii Naoatsu (井伊直充) | 1856-1862 | Hyōbu-no-shō (兵部少輔) | Junior 5th Rank, Lower Grade (従五位下) | 20,000 koku | |
| 10 | Ii Naoyasu (井伊直安) | 1862-1868 | Hyōbu-no-shō (兵部少輔) | Junior 5th Rank, Lower Grade (従五位下) | 20,000 koku | later 2nd Rank, shishaku |

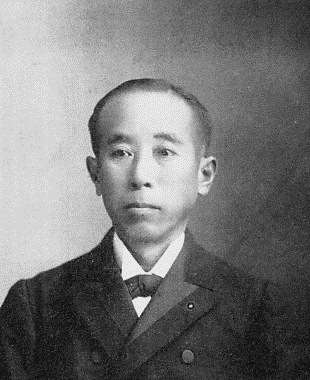
Ii Naoyasu, final daimyō of Yoita Domain

=== Ii Naonori ===
Ii Naonori (井伊直矩; February 1, 1694 – April 23, 1742) was the 3rd Ii daimyō of Kakegawa Domain, and the 1st Ii daimyō of Yoita. Masazumi was the fourth son of Ii Naooki of Hikone Domain, and the adopted heir of Ii Naotomo. He became daimyō in 1705 when his adopted father was relieved of his position by the Tokugawa shogunate due to mental illness and his refusal to go on the sankin kōtai to Edo. The domain was punished by a reduction in kokudaka from 35,000 to 20,000 koku. The following year, Naonori was transferred from Kakegawa to Yoita in Echigo Province, which had an equal kokudaka, but did not have the prestige of a castle. In 1715, he was ordered to serve as bugyō presiding over the 100th anniversary of Tokugawa Ieyasu's death at the Nikkō Tōshō-gū. In retired in 1731, and died at the domain's Edo residence in 1742. His wife was a daughter of Abe Masakuni of Fukuyama Domain.

=== Ii Naoharu ===
Ii Naoharu (井伊直陽; April 25, 1719 – December 1, 1732) was the 2nd Ii daimyō of Yoita. Naoharu was the eldest son of Ii Naonori and became daimyō on his father's retirement in 1731. He died less than 8 months later, at the age of 14, and only three days after he adopted Ii Naokazu as his heir.

=== Ii Naokazu ===
Ii Naokazu (井伊直矩; June 30, 1716 – May 26, 1735) was the 3rd Ii daimyō of Yoita. Naokazu was the eldest son of Kimata Moriyoshi, the karō of Hikone Domain. He was adopted as heir to Ii Naoharu in 1732 and became daimyō only three days later. His wife was a daughter of Tachibana Yasunaga of Miike Domain. He died in Edo in 1735 without a natural heir.

=== Ii Naoari ===
Ii Naoari (井伊直存; May 19, 1719 – October 28, 1760) was the 4th Ii daimyō of Yoita. Naoari was the fourth son of Matsudaira Tadamasa, the daimyō of Kuwana Domain. He was adopted as heir to Ii Naokazu in 1735 and became daimyō only three days later. During his career, he served as bugyō presiding over the Shogunal pilgrimage to Nikkō Tōshō-gū and to one of the Joseon missions to Japan. In 1756, the domain's Edo residence burned down. He died in Edo in 1760.

=== Ii Naokuni ===
Ii Naokuni (井伊直郡; November 23, 1743 – January 31, 1761) was the 5th Ii daimyō of Yoita. Naokuni was the second son of Ii Naoari and was born in Edo. In March 1750, he contracted smallpox, but recovered and outlived his father by a year. He died in Edo in 1761 at the age of 18.

=== Ii Naoakira ===
Ii Naoakira (井伊直朗; June 7, 1750 – February 4, 1820) was the 6th Ii daimyō of Yoita. Naoakira was the third son of Ii Naoari and was born in Edo. In 1761, he was adopted as heir to Naokuni, who died the following day. His wife was a younger daughter of Tanuma Okitsugu of Sagara Domain. During his career, he served as Osaka kaban and Sōshaban, and in 1781 was appointed a wakadoshiyori. In 1804, the domain's status was elevated to that of a "castle-holding domain". His younger son was adopted by Matsudaira Tadatomo of Kuwana Domain and subsequently became daimyō of Kuwana. He died in 1820 in Edo and was succeeded by his grandson.

=== Ii Naoteru ===
Ii Naoteru (井伊直暉; November 30, 1791 – June 29, 1826) was the 7th Ii daimyō of Yoita. Naoteru was born in Edo as the eldest son of Ii Naohiro, the eldest son of Naoakira. As his father died in 1792, he was named heir, and became daimyō on his grandfather's death in 1820. His wife was an adopted daughter of Ii Naonaka of Hikone Domain. He rebuilt Yoita jin'ya to more resemble a castle, in line with the improved prestige of the domain. He died in 1826 at the age of 36.

=== Ii Naotsune ===
Ii Naotsune (井伊直経; March 30, 1798 – July 31, 1856) was the 8th Ii daimyō of Yoita. Naotsune was born in Edo as the seventh son of Naoakira. He was adopted as Noteru's posthumous heir and became daimyō in 1826. His wife was a daughter of Matsudaira Nobuyuki of Tamba-Kameyama Domain. He was remembered as a good ruler, rebuilding the domain after damage caused by the 1828 Sanjō earthquake and reconstructing many Buddhist temples and Shinto shrines. He died in Edo in 1856 at the age of 58.

=== Ii Naoatsu ===
Ii Naoatsu (井伊直充; March 26, 1838 – November 15, 1862) was the 9th Ii daimyō of Yoita. Naoatsu was born in Yoita as the eldest son of Naotsune. He became daimyō on his father's death in 1856. He was noted for the creation of a han school in 1860. He died in Edo in 1862 at the age of 25.

=== Ii Naoyasu ===
Ii Naoyasu (井伊直安; March 13, 1851 – August 25, 1935) was the 10th (and final) Ii daimyō of Yoita. Naoyasu was born in Edo as the fourth son of Ii Naosuke of Hikone Domain. He was adopted as posthumous heir to Ii Naoatsu, but did not officially become recognised as daimyō until 1864, two years after Naoatsu's death. In 1868, he declared Yiota for the side of the imperial cause in the Boshin War, and was appointed imperial governor of Yoita by the Meiji government in 1868. In 1871, with the abolition of the han system, he moved to Tokyo. In 1872, he enrolled in Keio Gijuku, the forerunner to Keio University, and travelled to the United States with his brother, Ii Naonori. In 1884, he became a viscount (shishaku) in the kazoku peerage system. He served in the House of Peers from January 1896 to December 1920. In 1922, his court rank was elevated to Second Rank, and retired the same year. He died in 1935 and his grave is with the Hikone-Ii graves at the temple of Gotoku-ji in Setagaya, Tokyo. Naoyasu was also a noted painter in both the western and nihonga styles.

== See also ==
List of Han
