= Komoro Domain =

Komoro Domain 小諸藩
- under Tokugawa shogunate Japan
- 1590–1871
- Capital: Komoro Castle
- Area
  - Coordinates: 36°19′38.41″N 138°25′2.09″E
  - Type: Daimyō
- Historical era: Edo period
  - Established: 1590
  - Disestablished: 1871
- Today part of: part of Nagano Prefecture

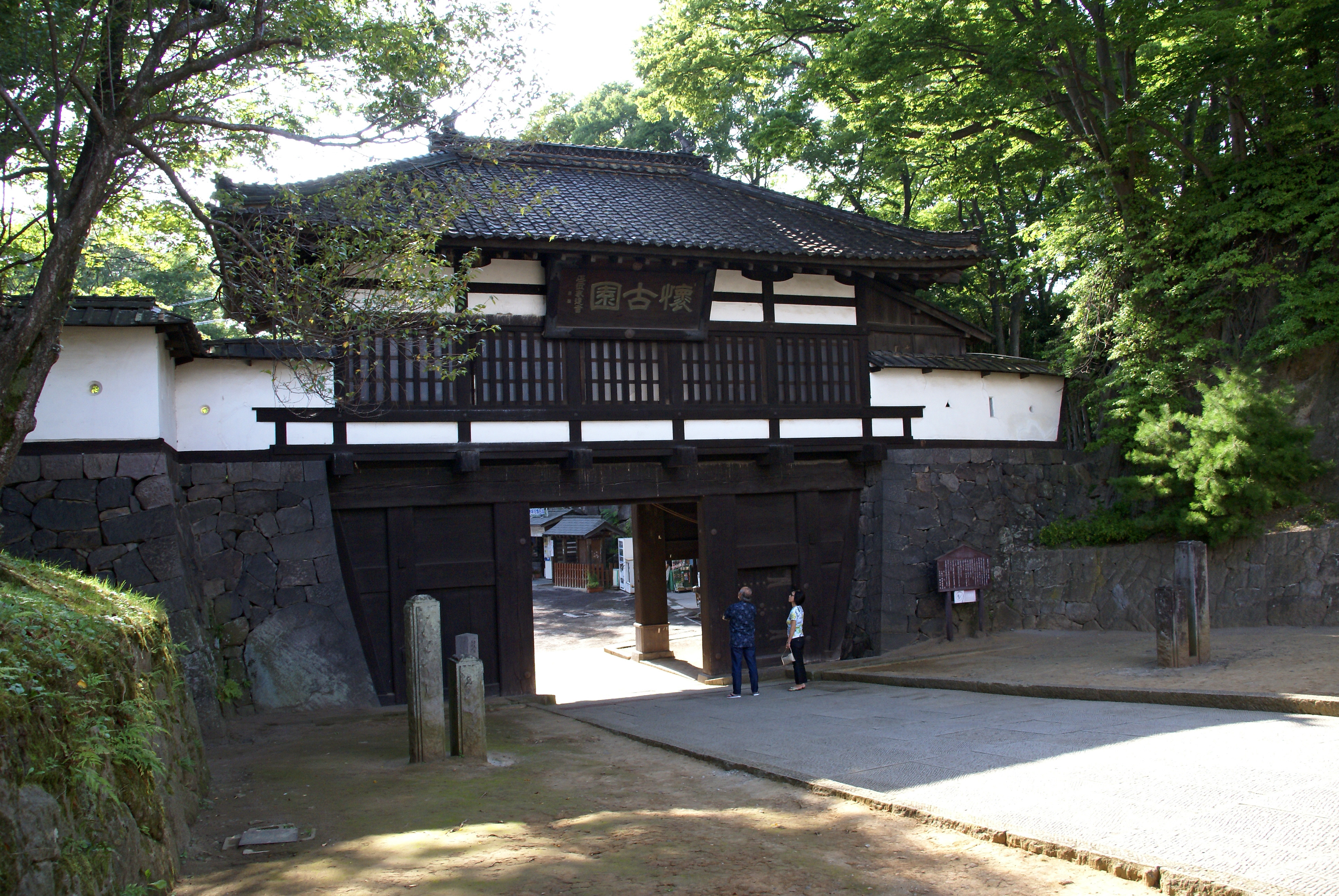
Komoro castle, administrative centre of Komoro Domain

Komoro Domain (小諸藩, Komoro han) was a feudal domain under the Tokugawa shogunate of Edo period Japan. It is located in Shinano Province, Honshū. The domain was centered at Komoro Castle, located in what is now part of the city of Komoro in Nagano Prefecture.

== History ==
The area which later became Komoro Domain was repeated contested between the Uesugi clan, the Takeda clan and the Later Hōjō clan during the Sengoku period, changing hands repeatedly. After Toyotomi Hideyoshi annihilated the Hōjō clan in the Siege of Odawara in 1590, he awarded Komoro as a 50,000 koku holding to Sengoku Hidehisa. The marked the start of Komoro Domain. He was confirmed in his status by Tokugawa Ieyasu after the Battle of Sekigahara, and his son, Sengoku Tadamasa was transferred to Ueda Domain in 1622.

Komoro was part of the holdings of Kōfu Domain from 1622 to 1624, but was revived as an independent domain for Matsudaira Norinaga from 1624 to 1647. On his death without an heir, the domain was placed under Matsumoto Domain for a year, until the transfer of Aoyama Munetoshi, who was raised from hatamoto status. He subsequently served as Osaka-jō dai from 1662, and Komoro was given to Sakai Tadayoshi, formerly of Isesaki Domain. Sakai was demoted to Tanaka Domain in Suruga Province in 1679. The next ruler of Komoro was Nishio Tadanari, formerly of Tanaka Domain. He made great efforts to undo the damage caused by the misgovernment of Sakai Tadayoshi, but was transferred to Yokosuka Domain in 1682. Komoro was then given to a junior branch of the Matsudaira clan from 1679 to 1702.

In 1702, Makino Yasushige was transferred to Komoro from Yoita Domain in Echigo Province. This at last brought stability to the administration of the domain, as the Makino clan continued to rule until the Meiji restoration.

During the Boshin War, the 10th daimyō, Makino Yasumasu quickly supported the imperial side, and participated in the Battle of Hokuetsu and was assigned to guard Usui Pass. However, in September 1869 he was forced to suppress an attempted coup d’etat within his own domain.

In July 1871, with the abolition of the han system, Komoro Domain briefly became Komoro Prefecture, and was merged into the newly created Nagano Prefecture.

== Bakumatsu period holdings ==
As with most domains in the han system, Komoro Domain consisted of several discontinuous territories calculated to provide the assigned kokudaka, based on periodic cadastral surveys and projected agricultural yields.

- Shinano Province
  - 16 villages in Chiisagata District
  - 46 villages in Saku District

== List of daimyō ==
#	Name	Tenure	Courtesy title	Court Rank	kokudaka	Notes
Sengoku clan (tozama) 1590–1622
1	Sengoku Hidehisa (仙石秀久)	1590-1614	Echizen-no-kami (越前守)	Junior 5th Rank, Lower Grade (従五位下)	50,000 koku	
2	Sengoku Hidemasa (仙石忠政)	1614-1622	Hyōbu-no-daifu (兵部大輔)	Junior 5th Rank, Lower Grade (従五位下)	50,000 koku	transfer to Ueda Domain
under Kofu Domain 1622–1624
Matsudaira clan (fudai) 1590–1622
1	Matsudaira Norinaga (松平憲良)	1624-1647	Inaba-no-kami (因幡守)	Junior 5th Rank, Lower Grade (従五位下)	50,000->45,000 koku	from Ogaki Domain
Matsumoto Domain 1647–1648
Aoyama clan (fudai) 1648–1662
1	Aoyama Munetoshi (青山宗俊)	1648-1662	Inaba-no-kami (因幡守)	Junior 5th Rank, Lower Grade (従五位下)	42,000 koku	transfer to Osaka jodai
Sakai clan, 1662-1679 (fudai)
1	Sakai Tadayoshi (酒井忠能)	1662-1679	Hyūga-no-kami (日向守)	Junior 5th Rank, Lower Grade (従五位下)	30,000 koku	transfer to Tanaka Domain
Nishio clan, 1679-1682 (fudai)
1	Nishio Tadanari (西尾忠成)	1679-1682	Oki-no-kami (隠岐守)	Junior 5th Rank, Lower Grade (従五位下)	25,000 koku	transfer to Yokosuka Domain
Ogyu-Matsudaira clan, 1682-1697 (fudai)
1	Matsudaira Norimasa (松平乗政)	1682-1684	Mimasakai-no-kami (美作守)	Junior 5th Rank, Lower Grade (従五位下)	20,000 koku	
2	Matsudaira Noritada (松平乗紀)	1684-1697	Noto-no-kami (能登守)	Junior 5th Rank, Lower Grade (従五位下)	20,000 koku	
Makino clan (fudai) 1696–1871
1	Makino Yasushige (牧野康重)	1696-1722	Suo-no-kami (周防守))	Junior 5th Rank, Lower Grade (従五位下)	15,000 koku	
2	Makino Yasuchika (牧野康周)	1722-1758	Naizen-no-kami (内膳正)	Junior 5th Rank, Lower Grade (従五位下)	15,000 koku	
3	Makino Yasumitsu (牧野康満)	1758-1784	Tōtōmi-no-kami (遠江守)	Junior 5th Rank, Lower Grade (従五位下)	15,000 koku	
4	Makino Yasuyori (牧野康陛)	1784-1794	Suo-no-kami (周防守)	Junior 5th Rank, Lower Grade (従五位下)	15,000 koku	
5	Makino Yasutomo (牧野康儔)	1794-1800	Naizen-no-kami (内膳正)	Junior 5th Rank, Lower Grade (従五位下)	15,000 koku	
6	Makino Yasunaga (牧野康長)	1800-1819	Naizen-no-kami (内膳正)	Junior 5th Rank, Lower Grade (従五位下)	15,000 koku	
7	Makino Yasuakira (牧野康明)	1819-1827	Suo-no-kami (周防守)	Junior 5th Rank, Lower Grade (従五位下)	15,000 koku	
8	Makino Yasunobu (牧野康命)	1827-1832	Tōtōmi-no-kami (遠江守)	Junior 5th Rank, Lower Grade (従五位下)	15,000 koku	
9	Makino Yasutoshi (牧野康哉)	1832-1863	Tōtōmi-no-kami (遠江守)	Junior 5th Rank, Lower Grade (従五位下)	15,000 koku	
10	Makino Yasumasa (牧野康済)	1863-1871	Tōtōmi-no-kami (遠江守)	Junior 5th Rank, Lower Grade (従五位下)	15,000 koku	

=== Makino Yasushige ===
Makino Yasushige (牧野康重; October 18, 1677 – January 4, 1723) was the 3rd Makino daimyō of Yoita Domain in Echigo Province and the 1st Makino daimyō of Komoro Domain under the Edo period Tokugawa shogunate. Ieshige was the fifth son of Honjō Munesuke of Ashikaga Domain and his mother was a princess of the Nijō clan. In 1688 he was adopted by Makino Yasumichi, and became daimyō of Yoita on the latter's retirement the following year. In 1702, he received an increase in kokudaka of 5000 koku, and was transferred to Komoro. His wife was a daughter of Ogasawara Tadakata of Kokura Domain. He died in 1723.

=== Makino Yasuchika ===
Makino Yasuchika (牧野康周; 1707 – February 15, 1758) was the 2nd Makino daimyō of Komoro. Yasuchika was the eldest son of Makino Yasushige. He was received in formal audience by Shogun Tokugawa Yoshimune in 1720, and became daimyō on his father's death in 1722. In 1725 he visited his domain for the first time. In 1731 he was appointed bugyō to oversee ceremonies at Nikkō Tōshōgū. In 1742, the domain suffered from severe damage due to storms and he applied for a loan of 2000 ryō from the shogunate. In 1751, he turned to the parent house of the Makino clan at Nagaoka Domain for financial assistance. His wife was a daughter of Rokugō Masaharu of Honjō Domain. He died in 1758.

=== Makino Yasumitsu ===
Makino Yasumitsu (牧野康満; October 29, 1732 – August 26, 1801) was the 3rd Makino daimyō of Komoro. Yasumitsu was the eldest son of Makino Yasuchika and was born in Komoro. He became daimyō on his father's death in 1758. In 1762 he was appointed a sōshaban, holding that position until his retirement in 1784. He retired to Edo, where he devoted his days to poetry, painting and drinking until his death in 1801. His wife was a daughter of Makino Sadamichi of Nobeoka Domain.

=== Makino Yasuyori ===
Makino Yasuyori (牧野康陛; 1750 – December 8, 1794) was the 4th Makino daimyō of Komoro. Yasuyori was the eldest son of Makino Yasumitsu and became daimyō on his father's retirement in 1784. In 1786 he was appointed Osaka kaban. He died at the clan's Edo residence at Koishikawa in 1794 at the age of 45. His wife was a daughter of Matsudaira Chikamitsu of Kitsuki Domain.

=== Makino Yasutomo ===
Makino Yasutomo (牧野康儔; April 7, 1773 – August 16, 1800) was the 5th Makino daimyō of Komoro. Yasutomo was the eldest son of Makino Yasuyori and became daimyō on his father's death in 1794. In 1798 he was appointed a Sōshaban. However, he was sickly and could only walk with a cane. He died of beriberi in Edo in 1800 at the age of 27. His wife was a daughter of Matsudaira Nobuhiro of Akashi Domain.

=== Makino Yasunaga ===
Makino Yasunaga (牧野康長; 1796 – January 28, 1868) was the 6th Makino daimyō of Komoro. Yasunaga was the eldest son of Makino Yasutomo and became daimyō on his father's death in 1800. In 1802 he established a han school. He received the courtesy title of Naizen-no-kami in 1814. He retired citing illness in 1819, but lived to 1868. He never took a formal wife.

=== Makino Yasuakira ===
Makino Yasuakira (牧野康明; February 25, 1800 – September 15, 1827) was the 7th Makino daimyō of Komoro. Yasuakira was the second son of Makino Yasutomo and became daimyō on his brother's retirement in 1819. He received the courtesy title of Naizen-no-kami in 1822. He died at the clan's Edo residence at Koishikawa in 1827 at the age of 28. His wife was a daughter of Torii Tadateru of Mibu Domain; however, he had no male heir.

=== Makino Yasunobu ===
Makino Yasunobu (牧野康命; December 27, 1809 – August 13, 1832) was the 8th Makino daimyō of Komoro. His name is also sometimes transliterated as "Yasunori". Yasunobu was the sixth son of Makino Tadakiyo of Nobeoka Domain and was adopted as heir to Makino Yasuakira. He became daimyō in 1827; however, he died at the clan's Edo residence at Hamamachi in 1832 at the age of 24. His wife was a daughter of Ishikawa Fusasuke of Kameyama Domain; however, he had no male heir.

=== Makino Yasutoshi ===
Makino Yasutoshi (牧野康哉; November 15, 1818 – July 28, 1863) was the 9th Makino daimyō of Komoro. Yasutoshi was born in Hibiya, Edo as the sixth son of Makino Sadamoto of Kasama Domain and was adopted as posthumous heir to Makino Yasunobu in 1832. At the time, the domain was suffering greatly form the Great Tenpō famine, and also from a smallpox epidemic. Yasunobu brought doctors with smallpox vaccine from Edo, and led the effort vaccinate the population by having his own children vaccinated first to set an example. From 1855, he attempted to institute numerous rural reforms based on the teachings of Ninomiya Sontoku and to create stockpiled against future bad harvests. He also encouraged the development of a washi paper industry. In 1858, he was appointed a wakadoshiyori, and was a strong supporter of the Tairō Ii Naosuke. He died in 1863 at the age of 46. His wife was a daughter of Matsudaira Nobuhide of Kameyama Domain. After her death, he remarried to a daughter of Kutsuki Tsunaeda of Fukuchiyama Domain.

=== Makino Yasumasa ===
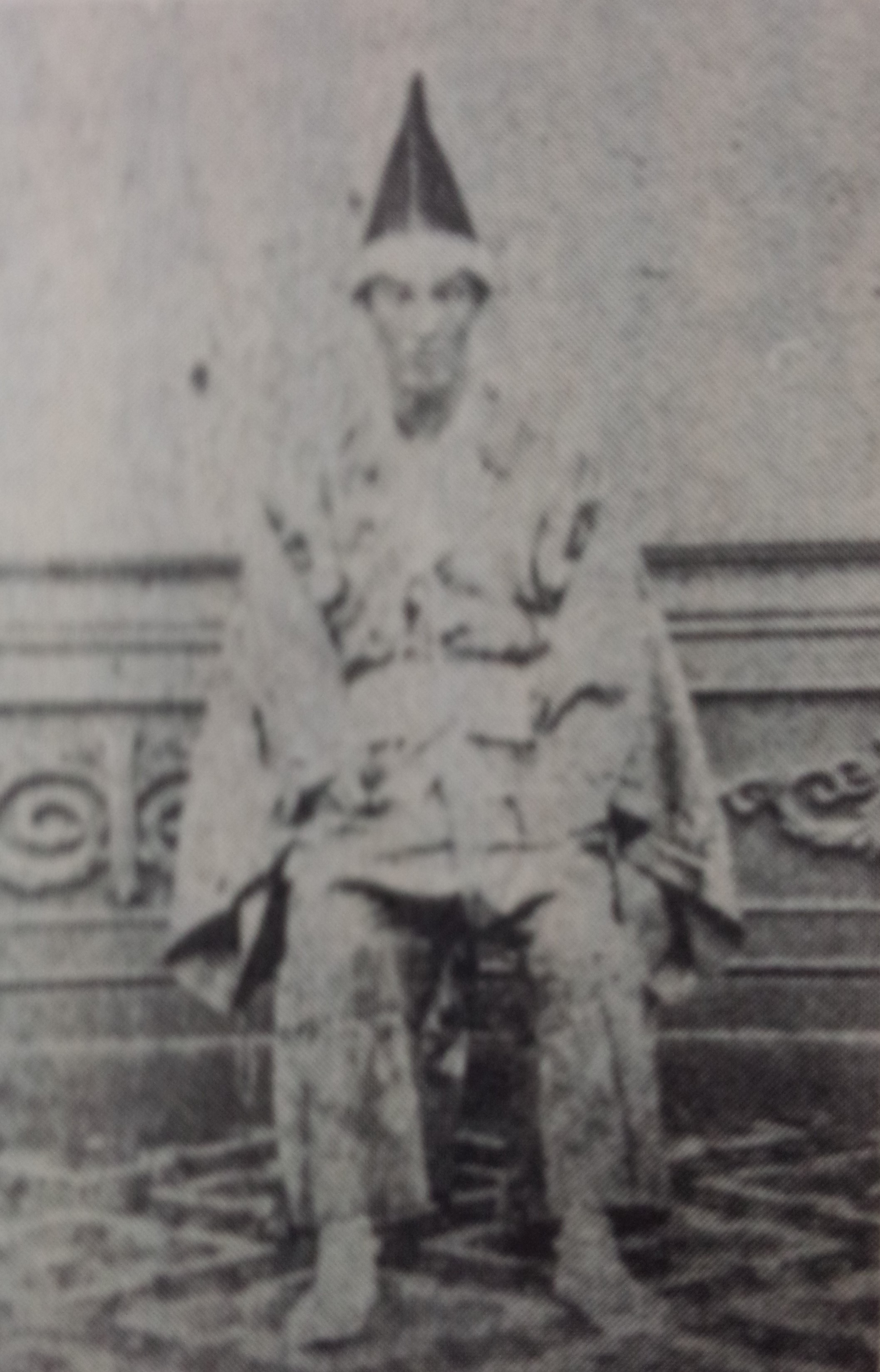
Makino Yasumasa

Makino Yasumasa (牧野康済; January 31, 1841 – January 15, 1918) was the 10th (and final) Makino daimyō of Komoro. Yasutoshi was the second son of Makino Yasutoshi and was received in formal audience by Shogun Tokugawa Iemochi in 1859. He became daimyō on his father's death in 1863 and from 1864 his courtesy title was promoted to Tōtōmi-no-kami. However, among his retainers, there was a strong faction which supported his younger brother Nobunosuke (later Honda Tadanao, daimyō of Okazaki Domain), and was forced to suppress an attempted coup. He also faced possible overthrow when he sided with the imperial faction in the Boshin War and ordered his forces against the pro-Tokugawa army at the Battle of Hokuetsu, as this placed the domain in direct conflict with its parent house at Nagaoka Domain. In September 1869, he also had to suppress a revolt by followers of the failed Mito rebellion within his domain. Later in 1869, he was appointed imperial governor of Komoro by the new Meiji government. On the abolition of the han system in July 1871, he changed his name to Yasutomi (康民). He retired from public life in 1883 and died in 1918.

== See also ==
List of Han
