= Matsudaira Shigekatsu =

Japanese daimyō

First (Nomi-Matsudaira) Daimyō of Sanjō
- In office 1612–1617
- Preceded by: Hori Naokiyo
- Succeeded by: Ichihashi Nagakatsu

Personal details
- Born: 1549
- Died: 1620 (aged 71)

Matsudaira Shigekatsu (松平 重勝; 1549 – January 6, 1620) was a Japanese daimyō of the early Edo period. Also known as Denzaburō (伝三郎). Inherited headship of the Nomi-Matsudaira (能見松平) from his father, Matsudaira Shigeyoshi. He served as a retainer first to Tokugawa Ieyasu, fighting at Komaki-Nagakute, and later was assigned to Ieyasu's sixth son Tadateru as a senior retainer. Following the dissolution of Tadateru's domain, Shigekatsu was made daimyō of the Sekiyado Domain in Shimōsa Province. Soon afterward, in 1619, he was transferred to the Yokosuka Domain, in Tōtōmi Province, rated at 26,000 koku. At this time, he also served as warden of Ieyasu's castle at Sunpu. During his career, he acquired a court rank of "junior 5th lower grade", as well as the titles of Echizen no Kami 越前守 and Ōsumi no Kami 大隅守.

Preceded by Hori Naokiyo	First (Nomi-Matsudaira) Daimyō of Sanjō; 1612–1616	Succeeded by Ichihashi Nagakatsu
Preceded by Matsudaira Tadayoshi	First (Nomi-Matsudaira) Daimyō of Sekiyado; 1617–1619	Succeeded by Ogasawara Masanobu
Preceded by Ōsuga Tadatsugu	First (Nomi-Matsudaira) Daimyō of Yokosuka; 1619–1620	Succeeded by Matsudaira Shigetada
