= Nishio Tadateru =

Japanese daimyō (1613–1654)

Nishio Tadateru 西尾忠照
- Born: 1613; Suruga Province, Japan
- Died: December 4, 1654 (aged 40–41)
- Other names: Nishio Tadaakira
- Occupation: daimyō

Nishio Tadateru (西尾 忠照; also Nishio Tadaakira) (1613 – December 4, 1654) was a daimyō of the early Edo period, Japan, who ruled Tsuchiura Domain in Hitachi Province and was subsequently transferred to Tanaka Domain in Suruga Province. His courtesy title was Tangō no Kami.

== Biography ==
Nishio Tadateru was the eldest son of Nishio Tadanaga, daimyō of Tsuchiura Domain, but was born in Suruga Province. In 1620, at the age of seven, he became head of the Nishio clan and daimyō of Tsuchura on his father's death. In 1621, he attended to Shōgun Tokugawa Hidetada during his pilgrimage to the Nikkō Tōshō-gū, and were permitted to expand the size of his castle. On February 11, 1649, his holdings were increased in size by an additional 5,000 koku when he was transferred to Tanaka Domain in Suruga.

Tadateru was married to a daughter of Takenaka Shigeyoshi, daimyō of Funai Domain in Bungo Province. He died in 1654, and was succeeded by his son Tadanari.

His grave is at the temple of Myōgen-ji in present-day Ageo, Saitama.

| Preceded by Matsudaira Nobuyoshi | Daimyō of Tsuchiura; 1620–1649 | Succeeded by Kutsuki Tanetsuna |
| Preceded by Matsudaira Tadaharu | Daimyō of Tanaka; 1649–1654 | Succeeded by Nishio Tadanari |
