= Hanabusa Domain =

Hanabusa Domain (花房藩, Hanabusa-han) was a Japanese feudal domain of the early Meiji period, located in Nagasa District, Awa Province. It was centered at what is now the Yokosuka (横渚) area of the city of Kamogawa in modern Chiba Prefecture.

== History ==
In 1867, during the Meiji Restoration, the final shōgun, Tokugawa Yoshinobu resigned his office to Emperor Meiji and leadership of the Tokugawa clan to Tokugawa Iesato. In 1868, Iesato was demoted in status to that of an ordinary daimyō, and assigned the newly created Shizuoka Domain, which included all of former Sunpu Domain, neighboring Tanaka and Ojima Domains, and additional lands in Tōtōmi and Mutsu Provinces for a total revenue of 700,000 koku. The new domain covered the western two-thirds of Shizuoka Prefecture, plus the Chita Peninsula in Aichi Prefecture.

In the process, the existing daimyōs in Suruga and Tōtōmi Provinces were displaced. This included the eighth (and final) daimyō of Yokosuka Domain, Nishio Tadaatsu. As Tadaatsu had proved his loyalty to the new Meiji government by contributed his forces to the imperial armies during the Boshin War despite his status as a fudai daimyō, he was allowed to keep his revenues of 35,000 koku, but was transferred to the newly created Hanabusa Domain in Awa Province.

However, in 1869, the title of daimyō was abolished, and with the abolition of the han system in 1871, Hanabusa Domain itself was abolished, becoming Hanabusa Prefecture, which in turn merged with neighboring Kisarazu Prefecture later that year to become modern Chiba Prefecture.

== List of daimyōs ==
- Nishio clan (fudai) 1867–1871

#	Name	Tenure	Courtesy title	Court Rank	Revenues
1	Nishio Tadaatsu (西尾忠篤)	1861–1868	Oki-no-kami	Viscount	35,000 koku
