= Nishio Tadasaka =

Japanese daimyō

Nishio Tadasaka 西尾忠受
- Born: 16 May 1821; Edo, Japan
- Died: August 31, 1861 (aged 40); Edo, Japan
- Other name: Oki-no-kami
- Occupation: daimyō
- Spouse: daughter of Toki Yorinobu

Nishio Tadasaka (西尾 忠受; May 16, 1821 – August 31, 1861) was a daimyō in late-Edo period Japan who ruled Yokosuka Domain in Tōtōmi Province.

Tadasaka was the second son of Sakai Tadazane, daimyō of Himeji Domain, and was adopted by the heirless 6th daimyō of Yokosuka Domain, Nishio Tadakata, to be his successor. When Tadakata retired from public life in 1843, Tadasaka became daimyō and head of the Nishio clan.

Tadasaka entered into the administration of the Tokugawa shogunate in 1846 as a Sōshaban (Master of Ceremonies). During his administration of his domain, he helped place its finances on more stable footing by encouraging the cultivation of green tea and the increased production of lumber. Tadasaka, like several of his predecessors, was skilled in the arts; he had the pseudonym Kakei (華渓).

Tadasaka died on August 26, 1861, at the Nishio clan residence in Soto-Sakurada, Edo, at age 40. His grave is located at the Nishio clan temple of Ryumin-ji in what is now part of the city of Kakegawa, Shizuoka. He was succeeded by his son Tadaatsu.

Preceded by Nishio Tadakata	Daimyō of Yokosuka; 1843-1861	Succeeded by Nishio Tadaatsu
