= Nishio Tadanao =

Japanese daimyō

Nishio Tadanao 西尾忠尚
- Born: 1689; Edo, Japan
- Died: April 25, 1760 (aged 70–71); Edo, Japan
- Other names: Oki no Kami
- Occupation: daimyō
- Spouse: daughter of Kyōgoku Takatoyo

Nishio Tadanao (西尾 忠尚; 1689 – April 25, 1760) was a daimyō in mid-Edo period Japan, who ruled Yokosuka Domain in Tōtōmi Province. He also served as an official within the administration of Tokugawa shogunate, rising through the ranks first as Sōshaban, Jisha-bugyō, Wakadoshiyori, and finally to the position of Rōjū.

== Biography ==
Tadanao was the fourth son of Nishio Tadanari, the first daimyō of the Nishio clan at Yokosuka Domain. He was recognized as heir apparent in 1696 and granted courtesy rank and title of junior 5th court rank, lower grade (ju go i no ge 従五位下), and Harima no Kami in 1703. He became clan leader upon his father's retirement in 1713. In the same year, he received his father's former courtesy title, Oki no Kami.

Tadanao entered the service of the Tokugawa administration in the spring of 1732, with his appointment to the offices of Sōshaban and Jisha-bugyō. After two years in these positions, he was promoted to wakadoshiyori. In 1745, his court rank was raised to junior 4th, lower grade (ju shi i no ge 従四位下), and his domain increased by 5,000 koku to 30,000 koku. The following summer, he was made a rōjū in the service of Shōgun Tokugawa Ieshige, and served in the position until 1747. His domains were further expanded by another 5,000 koku in 1749, bringing Yokosuka Domain to 35,000 koku in size.

Tadanao resumed his service as rōjū in 1751, but fell ill in the spring of 1760, while still serving as rōjū. He did not recover from his illness, and died at Tatsunokuchi, in Edo, a few days later. He was 72 years old. His grave is located at the Nishio clan temple of Ryumin-ji in modern Kakegawa, Shizuoka.

Tadanao's official wife was a daughter of Kyōgoku Takatoyo, the daimyō of Marugame Domain in Sanuki province, but he had no son. His adopted son Tadamitsu succeeded him as daimyō of Yokosuka and head of the Nishio clan.

Tadanao, like his father Tadanari, is remembered as a patron of culture and the arts. The Enshu-Yokosuka San-Kumano Taisai festival, still held every year during a week in April, was started by Tadanao, who spent much time in Edo and wished to bring something of its culture to Yokosuka.

Preceded by Nishio Tadanari	Daimyō of Yokosuka; 1713–1760	Succeeded by Nishio Tadamitsu
