= Nishio Tadayoshi =

Japanese daimyō

Nishio Tadayoshi 西尾忠善
- Born: 2 September 1768; Edo, Japan
- Died: January 30, 1831 (aged 62); Edo, Japan
- Occupation: daimyō
- Spouse: daughter of Nishio Tadayuki

Nishio Tadayoshi (西尾 忠善; September 2, 1768 – January 30, 1831) was a daimyō in mid-Edo period Japan, who ruled Yokosuka Domain in Tōtōmi Province.

Nishio Tadayoshi was the fourth son of Makino Sadanaga, daimyō of Kasama Domain in Hitachi Province. He became the adopted heir of the fourth daimyō of Yokosuka Domain, Nishio Tadayuki, in 1783 and married Tadayuki's daughter. Tadayoshi became daimyō and head of the Nishio clan after his adoptive father's death in 1801.

Tadayoshi entered the administration of the Tokugawa shogunate as a Sōshaban (Master of Ceremonies) in 1806. He encouraged learning amongst his retainers, founding the domain school, Shūdōkan (修道館), in 1811. He invited noted kokugaku scholar Yagi Tomiho to lecture there. Tadayoshi also revised fishing laws and encouraged sword production for the purpose of stabilizing the domain's finances. Despite these measures, he was confronted with a peasant revolt aiming for lowered taxes, in 1816. In 1829, citing illness, Tadayoshi resigned from his position as daimyō, yielding it to his fourth son, Tadakata.

Tadayoshi died at his Edo residence in Kobiki-chō on January 30, 1831, at age 63. His grave is located at the Nishio clan temple of Ryumin-ji in modern Kakegawa, Shizuoka.

Preceded by Nishio Tadayuki	Daimyō of Yokosuka; 1801-1829	Succeeded by Nishio Tadakata
