= Nishio Tadanari =

Japanese daimyō (1653–1713)

Nishio Tadanari 西尾忠成
- Born: 1653; Edo, Japan
- Died: November 30, 1713 (aged 59–60); Edo, Japan
- Other names: Oki no kami
- Occupation: Daimyō
- Spouse: daughter of Niwa Mitsushige

Nishio Tadanari (西尾 忠成; 1653 – November 30, 1713) was a daimyō of the early to mid Edo period, Japan, who ruled the Tanaka and Komoro domains, and was finally transferred to Yokosuka Domain in Tōtōmi Province, where his descendants ruled until the Meiji Restoration.

== Biography ==
Nishio Tadanari was the eldest son of Nishio Tadaakira, daimyō of Tanaka Domain in Suruga Province. However, as Tadaakira died in 1654, Tadanari succeeded to the Nishio clan leadership as an infant. Tanaka Domain's revenues under the Nishio had been 25,000 koku; but since Tadanari's uncle Nishio Tadatomo was granted 5000 koku of territory, the domain's income was reduced to 20,000 koku. In 1661 the young Tadanari was received by shōgun Tokugawa Ietsuna, and given the courtesy title of Oki no kami and junior 5th court rank, lower grade. Tanaka Domain reverted to 25,000 koku status upon Nishio Tadatomo's death in 1675; however, soon afterward, in 1679, the Nishio clan was relocated to Komoro Domain in Shinano Province. Tadanari made great efforts to fix the damage caused by the misgovernment of Sakai Tadayoshi, the previous lord of Komoro; however, he was transferred once more (after barely three years in Shinano) to Yokosuka Domain.

In Yokosuka, Tadanari again made great efforts to improve the economic status of his domain, modernizing his castle town and even entertaining emissaries from the Korean court in the same year as his move to Yokosuka (1682). He was also famed as a skilled painter and patron of the arts. However, administering the domain became a great burden, especially after the major earthquake of 1707, and he chose to retire, yielding clan headship to his son, Tadanao, in the summer of 1713. Tadanari died in Sakurada, outside of Edo, in the fall of the same year, at age 61.

His grave is at the temple of Myōgen-ji in present-day Ageo, Saitama.

Preceded by Nishio Tadateru	Daimyō of Tanaka; 1654–1679	Succeeded by Sakai Tadayoshi
Preceded by Sakai Tadayoshi	Daimyō of Komoro; 1679–1682	Succeeded by Matsudaira Norimasa
Preceded by Honda Toshinaga	Daimyō of Yokosuka; 1682–1713	Succeeded by Nishio Tadanao
