= Matsudaira Shigeyoshi =

Matsudaira Jirōemon Shigeyoshi (松平 二郎右衛門 重吉; 1493 – October 5, 1580) was a head of the Nōmi-Matsudaira (能見 松平), a branch of the main Matsudaira house which later became the Tokugawa shogunal family.

== Life ==
Shigeyoshi served three successive generations of the main Matsudaira line: Kiyoyasu, Hirotada, and (Tokugawa) Ieyasu. Served as Okazaki-sōbugyō (Okazaki Magistrate) with Torii Tadayoshi, father of the famous Torii Mototada. Shigeyoshi's 4th son Matsudaira Shigekatsu went on to be the daimyō of Tōtōmi-Yokosuka (26,000 koku).
