= Komoro Castle =

Fortification

Coordinates: 36°19′38.41″N 138°25′2.09″E

Komoro Castle 小諸城
- Komoro, Nagano Prefecture, Japan
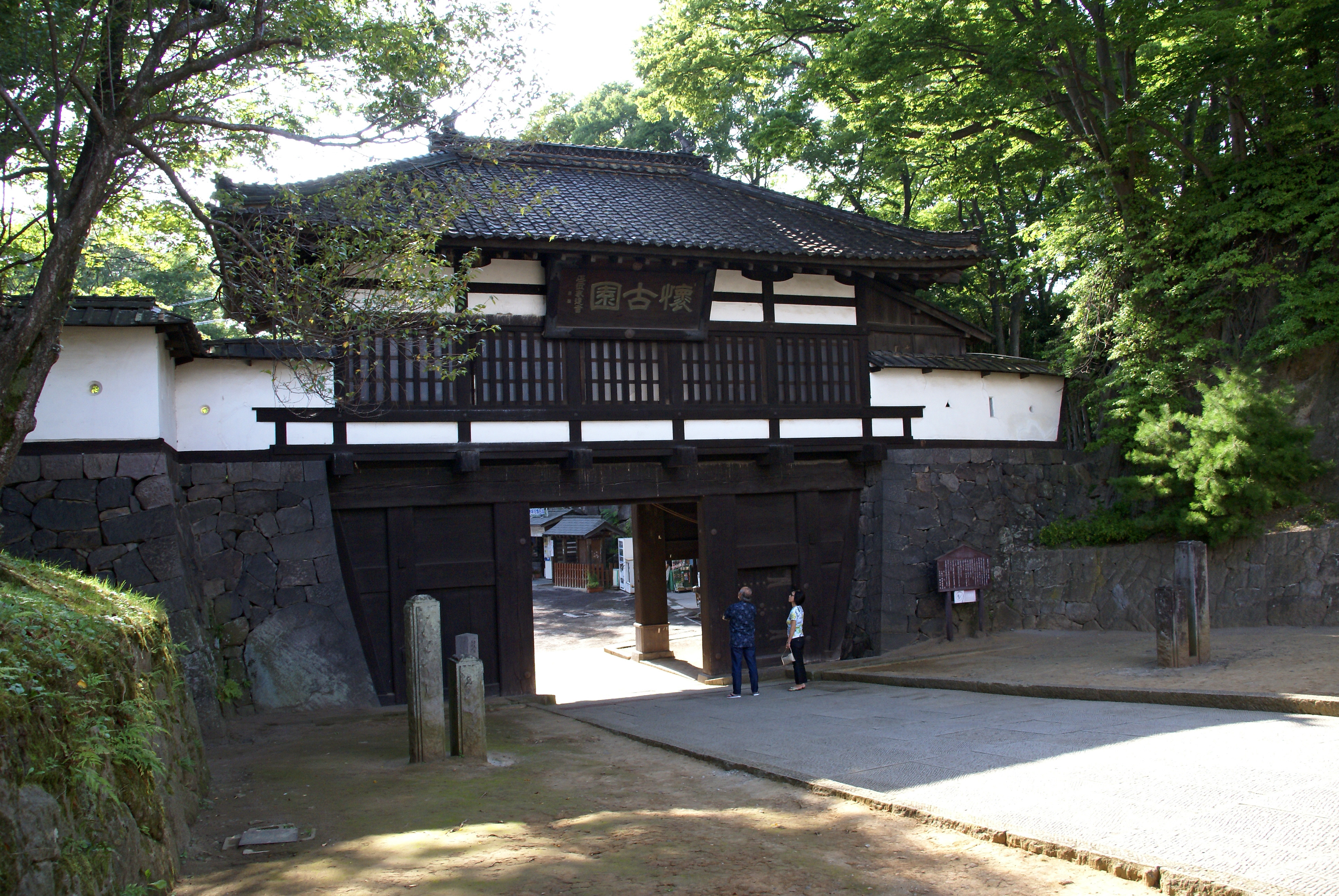
- San-no-mon gate of Komoro Castle

Site information
- Type: hirayama-style Japanese castle
- Open to the public: yes

Location

Site history
- Built: 1554
- Built by: Takeda Shingen or Yamamoto Kansuke (general)
- In use: Sengoku-Edo period
- Demolished: 1871

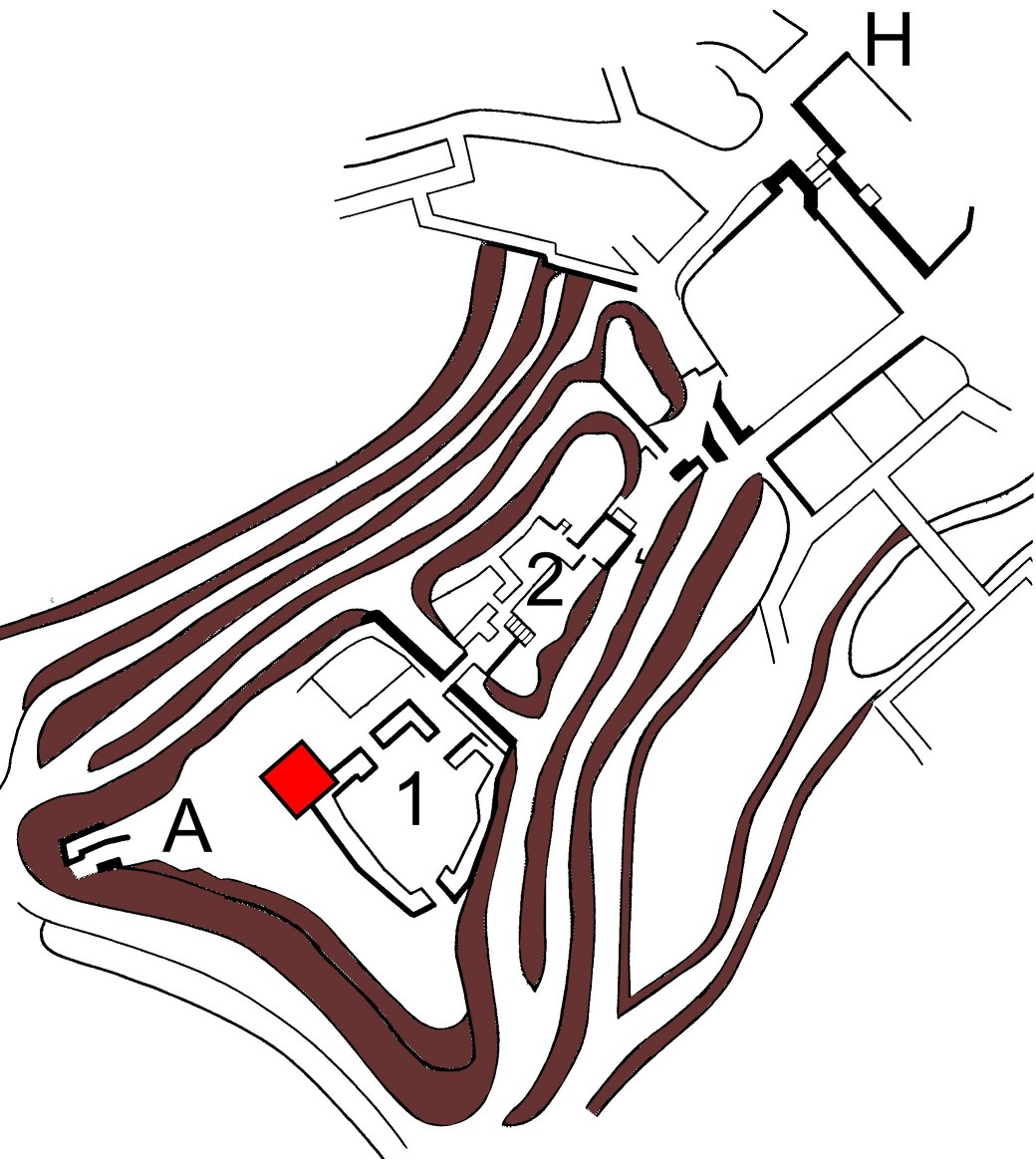
Plan of Komoro Castle. The red square = Remains of Tenshukaku

Komoro Castle (小諸城, Komoro-jō) is a Japanese castle located in the city of Komoro, central Nagano Prefecture, Japan. At the end of the Edo period, Komoro Castle was home to a junior branch of the Makino clan, daimyō of Komoro Domain. It was also known as Ana-jō (穴城, castle which is located in a place that is lower than jôkamachi) or Hakatsuru-jō (白鶴城, White Crane Castle). Today, it is open to public as Kaikoen (懐古園).

== History ==
During the Muromachi period, the area which later became the city of Komoro was under the control of a local warlord, Oi Mitsutada, who built a fortification at the site of Komoro Castle. After the area came under the control of Takeda Shingen by 1554, the fortification was completely reconstructed into a castle under the direction of Shingen's master strategist Yamamoto Kansuke. Following the destruction of the Takeda clan by Oda Nobunaga in 1582, the castle was given to Takigawa Kazumasu, one of Nobunaga's generals. After Nobunaga was assassinated in the Honnō-ji incident, it came briefly under the control of the Later Hōjō clan of Odawara.

After 1590, following the Battle of Odawara, Komoro came under the control of Tokugawa Ieyasu, who assigned it to his general Sengoku Hidehisa as daimyō of Komoro Domain, a 50,000 koku holding later confirmed under the Tokugawa shogunate. He reinforced the walls and reorganized the structure around a central bailey surrounded by a north and south bailey. He was followed by his son, Sengoku Tadamasa. Tadamasa improved the castle, and the three-story Tenshukaku's foundation dates from this time.

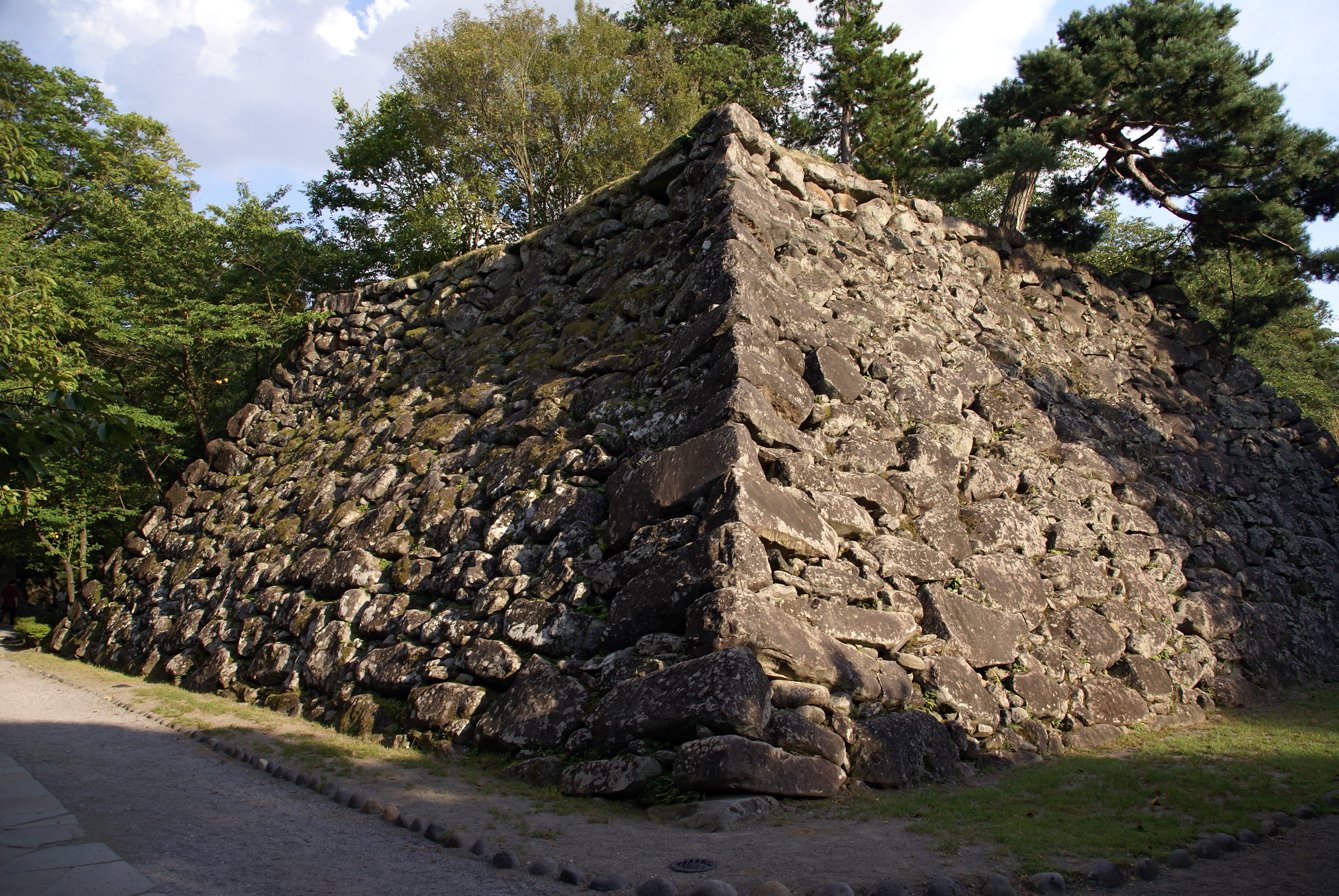
The foundation of the tench (Tenshukaku)

The domain was transferred to the Hisamatsu branch of the Matsudaira clan from 1624–1648. In 1626, the donjon was struck by lightning and burned down. It was never rebuilt. The domain and castle subsequently passed through a number of clans: the Aoyama from 1648-1662, the Sakai from 1662-1679, the Nishio from 1679–1682 and the Ishikawa clanfrom 1682–1702. In 1702, a junior branch of the Makino clan was awarded Komoro, and remained in control until the end of the Edo period. The castle was damaged from flooding in 1742 (ja).

Following the Meiji Restoration, Komoro Castle was abandoned, and in 1871 with the abolition of the han system, most of its remaining structures were demolished or donated to nearby Buddhist temples and a merchant house.

== Kaikoen ==
Currently, the castle's ruins are open to the public as Kaikoen (懐古園) which means the nostalgic park, along with two surviving gates, the Ōtemon (The fourth gate) and San-no-mon (The third gate), both of which have been declared Important Cultural Properties. The Ōtemon is one of the original structures from the early Edo period, and the San-no-mon was rebuilt in 1765 after the 1742 flood. In addition, two other gates survive at Buddhist temples within Komoro city and a portion of the central palace structure is in private hands in the city of Tōmi. Kaikoen is also famous for beautiful cherry blossoms and autumn leaves. The Shinano Railway Line cuts through the grounds of the castle, isolating the Ōtemon from the other remaining structures.

Also located within the former castle grounds is an amusement park, a zoo which opened in 1926, and a museum dedicated to Shimazaki Tōson.

Komoro Castle was listed as one of the 100 Fine Castles of Japan by the Japan Castle Foundation in 2006.

== Literature ==
- De Lange, William (2021). An Encyclopedia of Japanese Castles. Groningen: Toyo Press. pp. 600 pages. ISBN 978-9492722300.
- Takada, Tōru: Komoro-jo in: Miura, Masayuki (eds): Shiro to jin'ya. Tokoku-hen. Gakken, 2006. ISBN 978-4-05-604378-5, S. 100th
- Nishigaya, Yasuhiro (eds): Komoro-jo. In: Nihon Meijo Zukan, Rikogaku-sha, 1993. ISBN 4-8445-3017-8.
- Schmorleitz, Morton S. (1974). Castles in Japan. Tokyo: Charles E. Tuttle Co. pp. 144–145. ISBN 0-8048-1102-4.
- Motoo, Hinago (1986). Japanese Castles. Tokyo: Kodansha. p. 200 pages. ISBN 0-87011-766-1.
- Mitchelhill, Jennifer (2004). Castles of the Samurai: Power and Beauty. Tokyo: Kodansha. p. 112 pages. ISBN 4-7700-2954-3.
- Turnbull, Stephen (2003). Japanese Castles 1540–1640. Osprey Publishing. p. 64 pages. ISBN 1-84176-429-9.
