= Nishio Tadayuki =

Japanese daimyō (1749–1801)

Nishio Tadayuki 西尾忠移
- Born: 1749; Edo, Japan
- Died: May 9, 1801 (aged 51–52); Yokosuka Domain, Japan
- Other names: Oki no Kami
- Occupation: daimyō
- Known for: ==spouse== daughter of Tanuma Okitsugu

Nishio Tadanao (西尾 忠移; 1749 – May 9, 1801) was a daimyō in mid-Edo period Japan, who ruled Yokosuka Domain in Tōtōmi Province.

Nishio Tadayuki was the second son of the third daimyō of Yokosuka Domain, Nishio Tadamitsu. As his elder brother Tadamasa died in October 1765, Tadayuki was chosen to succeed his father. In 1766 he received court rank and Yamashiro no Kami. In 1782, he succeeded his newly retired father as daimyō of the Yokosuka Domain, also receiving his father's courtesy title of Oki no Kami.

Tadayuki entered the administration of the Tokugawa shogunate in 1784, holding the concurrent offices of Sōshaban and Jisha-bugyō. There was a brief period where he was barred from service (after the burning of his Edo residence later that year), but he was soon back to work, and even retained his position despite the fact that his father-in-law was Tanuma Okitsugu. During his tenure, Tadayuki assisted in the attainder of Sagara Domain.

In the administration of Yokosuka Domain, Tadayuki improved the financial situation by encouraging sweet potato cultivation and research into sugar refining. He also had a great personal interest in the arts and in rangaku, and employed many prominent figures in this field, including Takamori Kankō.

Tadayuki died in Yokosuka Castle, on May 9, 1801. As his biological son had died young, his adopted heir Nishio Tadayoshi succeeded him. His grave is located at the Nishio clan temple of Ryumin-ji in modern Kakegawa, Shizuoka.

Preceded by Nishio Tadamitsu	Daimyō of Yokosuka; 1782-1801	Succeeded by Nishio Tadayoshi
