= Nishio Tadamitsu =

Japanese daimyō

Nishio Tadamitsu 西尾忠需
- Born: 1716; Edo, Japan
- Died: July 22, 1789 (aged 72–73); Edo, Japan
- Occupation: daimyō

Nishio Tadamitsu (西尾 忠需; 1716 – April 25, 1760) was a daimyō in mid-Edo period Japan, who ruled Yokosuka Domain in Tōtōmi Province.

Tadamitsu was the second son of Kyōgoku Takatoyo, daimyō of Marugame Domain in Sanuki Province. As Nishio Tadanao, had no heirs, he adopted his nephew in 1729. In 1731, Tadamitsu received the courtesy title of Mondo no Shō (主水正) along with junior 5th court rank, lower grade (ju go i no ge 従五位下). Tadamitsu became head of the Nishio clan in 1760, on Tadanao's death, and was appointed Sōshaban (master of ceremonies) in the administration of the Tokugawa shogunate. He retired in 1782, and was succeeded by his son Tadayuki.

Tadamitsu died in Edo in 1789, at age 74. His grave is located at the Nishio clan temple of Ryumin-ji in modern Kakegawa, Shizuoka.

Preceded by Nishio Tadanao	Daimyō of Yokosuka; 1760-1782	Succeeded by Nishio Tadayuki
