= Yokosuka Castle =

Japanese castle located in Kakegawa city

- 横須賀城
- Kakegawa, Shizuoka prefecture, Japan
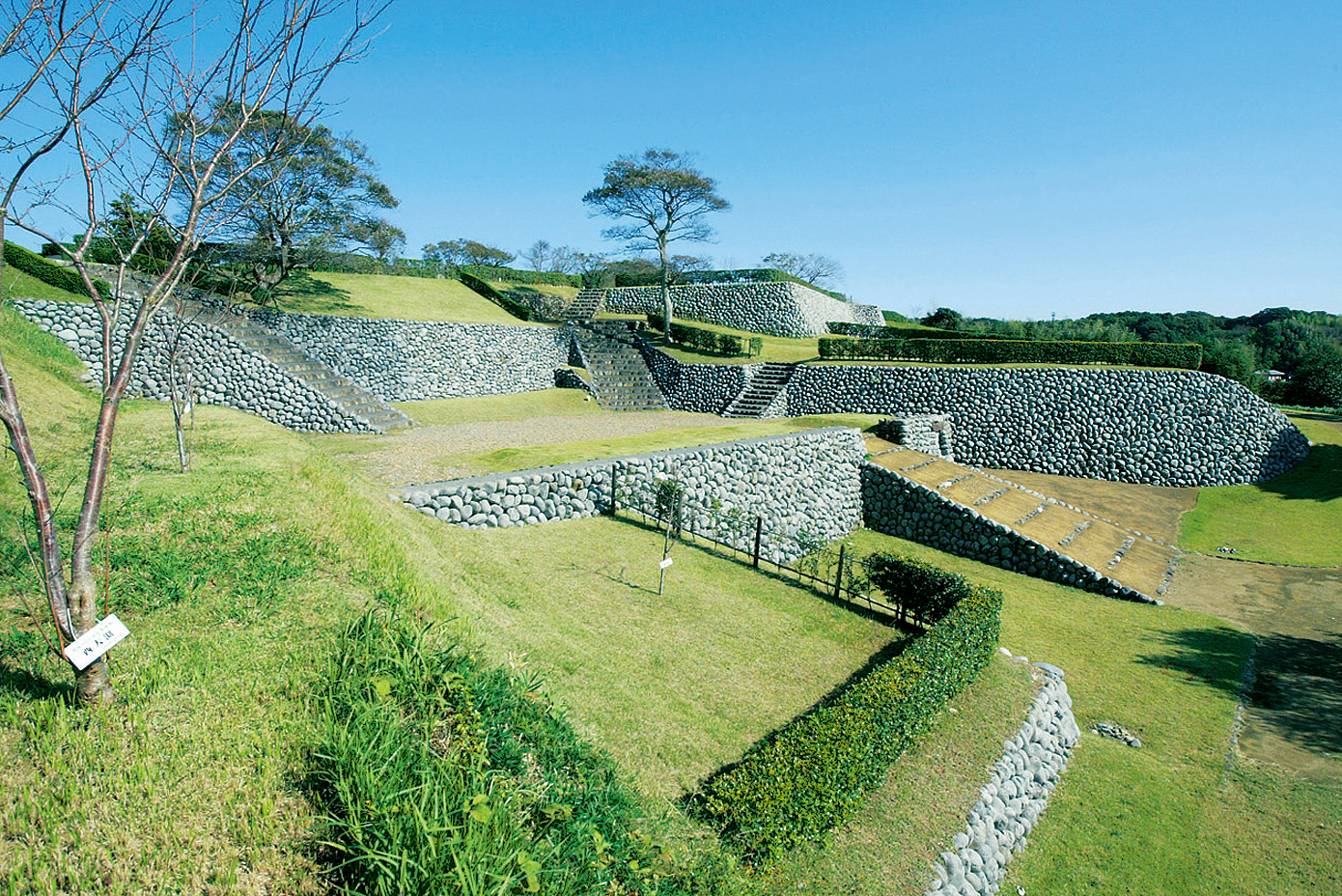
- Ruins of Yokosuka Castle

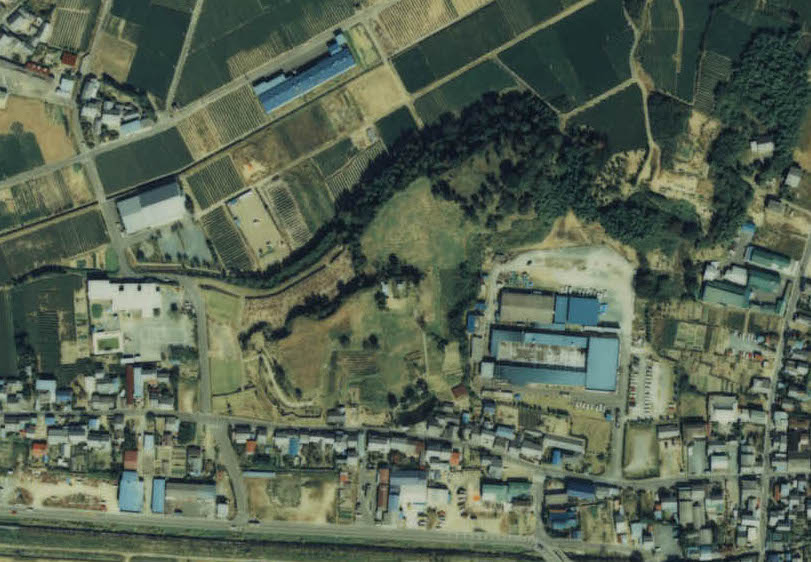
- Aerial photograph of Yokosuka Castle Park in 1988

Site information
- Type: Hirayama-style Japanese castle
- Open to the public: yes
- Condition: ruins

Location
- Location within Shizuoka Prefecture Location within Japan
- Coordinates: 34°41′8″N 137°58′16″E

Site history
- Built: c. 1580; 446 years ago
- Built by: Ōsuga Yasutaka
- In use: Edo period
- Demolished: 1871; 155 years ago

Yokosuka Castle (横須賀城, Yokosuka-jō) is a Japanese castle located in Ōsuka in the southern part of what is now the city of Kakegawa, Shizuoka, Japan. It was built in the Sengoku period and was the capital of Yokosuka Domain under the Tokugawa shogunate of Edo period Japan. In 1981, the castle ruins were designated as a National Historic Site.

== History ==
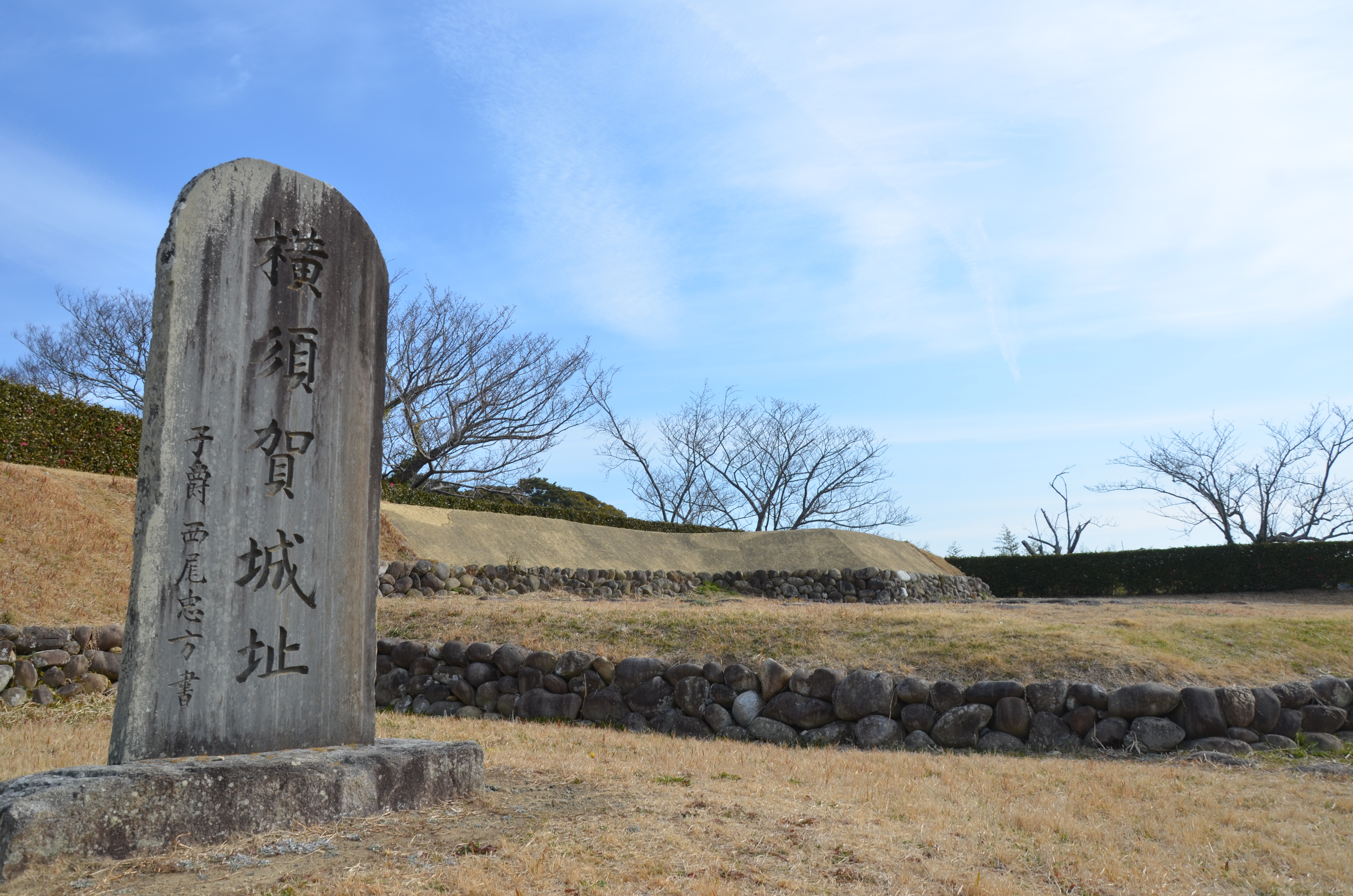
Monument of the Ruins of Yokosuka Castle

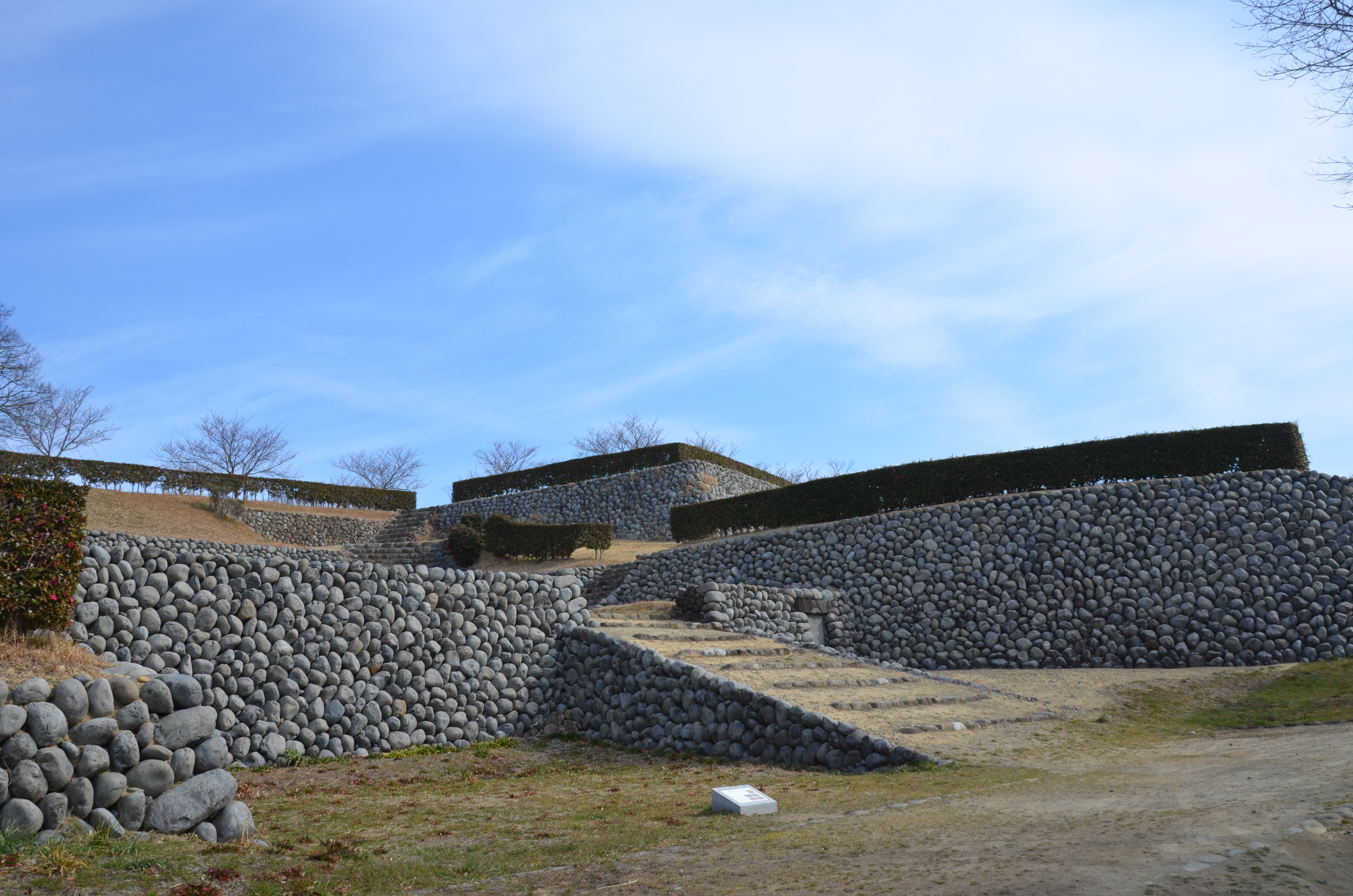
Ruins of Yokosuka Castle

During the Muromachi period, the Imagawa clan ruled Suruga and Tōtōmi Provinces from their base at Sunpu (modern-day Shizuoka City). After Imagawa Yoshimoto was defeated at the Battle of Okehazama, Tōtōmi Province became a contested territory between Tokugawa Ieyasu from neighboring Mikawa Province and Takeda Katsuyori from Kai province. Takeda Katsuyori established himself at the former Imagawa stronghold of Takatenjin Castle and resisted all efforts by the Tokugawa armies to dislodge him. Tokugawa Ieyasu therefore ordered that a series of castles be built to block off all access to Takatenjin Castle and thus starve the defenders into submission. One of these castles was Yokosuka Castle, which was built by Ieyasu's retainer Ōsuga Yasutaka in 1580. After Takatenjinn Castle fell in 1581 it was abandoned, and Yokosuka Castle grew in importance as a regional administrative center.

Following the establishment of the Tokugawa shogunate, the castle was expanded and modernized with water moats connecting to the sea and stone facing on its formerly earthen ramparts. Yokosuka Castle was noteworthy in that it used rounded boulders from the Tenryū River in the walls of its moats, instead of cut stone. The tenshu was a four-story, three-roof structure.

The castle passed through a number of fudai daimyō clans before coming under the control of the Nishio clan in 1682, under whose control it remained until the Meiji Restoration in 1868.

The keep was destroyed in an earthquake in 1707, and was not rebuilt. Following the Meiji restoration, all remaining building were destroyed except for one gate from the Ni-no-maru Bailey which was preserved at the temple of Senyō-ji in Yokosuka, a portion of the daimyō's palace, which was transferred to the temple of Yusan-ji nearby Fukuroi city. Today, a portion of the moats and earthen walls remain, and a local history museum has been built within the site of the former main bailey.

== See also ==
- List of Historic Sites of Japan (Shizuoka)
- Yokosuka Domain
