= Honda Toshinaga =

Japanese daimyō

Honda Toshinaga 本多利長
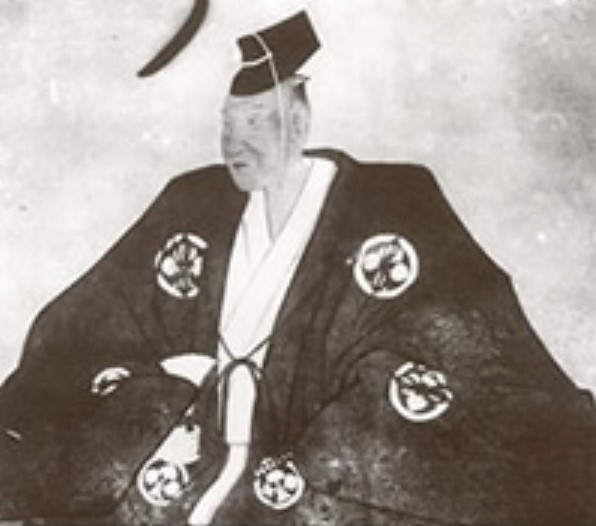
- Honda Toshinaga
- Born: 1635
- Died: January 21, 1693 (aged 57–58)
- Other names: Echizen no Kami
- Occupation: daimyō
- Spouse: daughter of Matsudaira Masatsuna

Honda Toshinaga (本多 利長; 1635 – January 21, 1693) was a daimyō of the early to mid Edo period, Japan, who ruled Okazaki and Yokosuka domains, and was finally transferred to Murayama Domain in Dewa Province.

Toshinaga was the 6th son of Honda Tadatoshi, daimyō of Okazaki Domain. His mother was a daughter of Inoue Masanari, daimyō of Yokosuka Domain. Toshinaga succeeded to clan leadership upon his father's death in 1645; however, he received only 50,000 of the 60,000 koku that had comprised Okazaki Domain under Tadatoshi's rule; the remaining 10,000 koku was divided between his brothers Honda Sukehisa and Honda Toshirō.

Toshinaga was transferred to Yokosuka Domain during the same year. He held the courtesy title of junior 5th court rank, lower grade (ju go i no ge 従五位下), and Echizen no Kami and was married to a daughter of Matsudaira Masatsuna, daimyō of Tamanawa Domain in Sagami Province.

The Tokugawa shogunate confiscated Yokosuka Domain on February 23, 1682, charging Toshinaga with gross misconduct and repressive governance. He was later pardoned, and given 10,000 koku of land in Dewa Province in northern Japan, which became known as Murayama Domain. Toshinaga died in 1692, at age 58, and was succeeded by his adopted son Honda Sukeyoshi.

Toshinaga's grave is at the temple of Kyōzen-ji, in Roppongi, Tokyo.

Preceded by Honda Tadatoshi	Daimyō of Okazaki; 1645	Succeeded by Mizuno Tadayoshi
Preceded by Inoue Masatoshi	Daimyō of Yokosuka; 1645-1682	Succeeded by Nishio Tadanari
Preceded by none	Daimyō of Murayama; 1682-1692	Succeeded by Honda Sukeyoshi
