= Shojiro Nishio =

Japanese academic

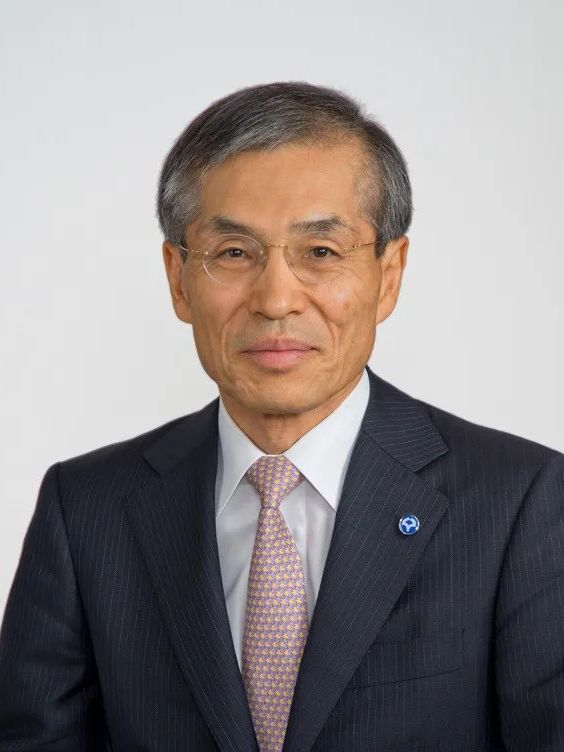
- Education: Kyoto University
- Awards: Purple Ribbon Medals of Honor (Japan); Person of Cultural Merit
- Scientific career
- Fields: Data engineering
- Workplaces: Osaka University
- Website: www-nishio.ist.osaka-u.ac.jp/~nishio/

Shojiro Nishio (西尾 章治郎, Nishio Shōjirō) is a Japanese information scientist and technology scholar and the 18th president of Osaka University. Having co-authored or co-edited more than 55 books and more than 650 refereed journal or conference papers as well as serving on editorial boards of major information sciences journals, Nishio is considered one of the most prominent and influential researchers on database systems and networks.

He became Osaka University's full professor in 1992. Thereafter he has held a number of key leadership positions of Osaka University such as the Founding Director of the Cybermedia Center, Dean of Graduate School of Information Science and Technology, Executive Vice President prior to becoming the university's president in 2015.

In addition, Nishio has served on numerous committees and governing bodies of the Ministry of Education, Culture, Sports, Science and Technology (MEXT) and the Japan Science and Technology Agency (JST). In his capacity both as a leading computer scientist and president of Japan's leading research university, Nishio has facilitated the formulation of Japan's higher education and science policies and been instrumental in setting their overall directions.

Nisho has become a member of the Science Council of Japan, the country's Academy of Science, since 2006 and acted as the Chair of Informatics from 2011 to 2014.

== Education ==
Nishio was a student at Kyoto University. He earned a Bachelor of Engineering in 1975, a Master of Engineering in 1977, and a Ph.D. in engineering in 1980.

== Honors ==
Nishio was awarded the Medal of Honor with Purple Ribbon from the Emperor of Japan in 2011 for his outstanding and important academic contributions. He received the Distinguished Achievement and Contributions Award in the information science and technology field from the MEXT, Japan in 2014. In 2016, he was named a Person of Cultural Merit for his significant achievements in the field of Information Science, the title that confers among the highest honors and distinctions for academics in Japan.

In recognition of his outstanding academic achievements and two decades of service to the university, he was also conferred the title of Distinguished Professor in July 2013 from Osaka University.

== Research Contributions and Awards ==
Nishio's areas of expertise range from database systems including concurrency control, knowledge discovery, deductive and object-oriented databases, multimedia systems, to database system architectures for advanced networks such as broadband networks and mobile computing environments. Many of his papers appear in journals in those fields, such as IEEE Transactions, ACM Transactions, and Data & Knowledge Engineering (Elsevier), and the proceedings of some of the best level conferences, such as IEEE International Conference on Data Engineering (ICDE), International Conference on Very Large Data Bases (VLDB), IEEE International Conference on Distributed Computing Systems (ICDCS), IEEE International Conference on Pervasive Computing and Communications (PerCom), IEEE International Conference on Data Mining (ICDM), and International World Wide Web Conference (WWW).

Nishio has served as a member of the Program or Organizing Committees for more than 100 international conferences including VLDB, ACM SIGMOD, IEEE ICDE, and IEEE Infocom. He served as the Program Committee (PC) Co-Chairs for several international conferences including DOOD 1989, VLDB 1995, and IEEE ICDE 2005.

He served as a member of the executive committee of the IEEE Computer Society Technical Committee on Data Engineering (Asia Coordinator) (1992-1997), the vice-chair and PC Chair of the Japan Chapter of ACM SIGMOD (1994-1995), and a member of the Board of Directors of the VLDB Endowment (2002-2007).

He served as an editor of journals in his research fields, such as IEEE Transactions on Knowledge and Data Engineering, VLDB Journal, ACM Transactions on Internet Technology.

Nishio received the 2001 Achievement Award from the Institute of Electronics, Information and Communication Engineers (IEICE), the 2004 Achievement Award from Funai Foundation for Information Technology (FFIT), the 2010 Distinguished Achievement and Contributions Award from the Information Processing Society of Japan (IPSJ), the 2010 Distinguished Achievement and Contributions Award from the Database Society of Japan (DBSJ), the 2012 Distinguished Achievement Award from Tateisi (OMRON) Science and Technology Foundation, and the 2013 Distinguished Achievement and Contributions Award from the IEICE.

Nishio is a member of learned societies, including ACM, DBSJ (President: 2012–2013), IEEE (Life Fellow), IEICE (Fellow), IPSJ (Fellow and President: 2017–2018), and the Japan Federation of Engineering Societies (Fellow).

== Selected publications ==
- Shirakawa, M.; Hara, T.; Nishio, S. (2017). "IDF for Word N-grams". ACM Transactions on Information Systems. 36 (1): 5:1–5:38. doi:10.1145/3052775. S2CID 207248811.
- Komai, Y.; Sasaki, Y.; Hara, T.; Nishio, S. (2014). "KNN Query Processing in Mobile Ad Hoc Networks". IEEE Transactions on Mobile Computing. 13 (5): 1090–1103. doi:10.1109/TMC.2013.133. S2CID 17890717.
- Harumoto, K.; Nakano, T.; Fukumura, S.; Shimojo, S.; Nishio, S. (2005). "Effective Web browsing through content delivery adaptation". ACM Transactions on Internet Technology. 5 (4): 571–600. doi:10.1145/1111627.1111628. S2CID 17066499.
- Nishio, S. (2000). "Opening up New Vistas on Advanced Multimedia Content Processing". New Generation Computing. 18 (4): 295–303. doi:10.1007/BF03037549. S2CID 21082199.
- Han, J.; Nishio, S.; Kawano, H.; Wang, W. (1998). "Generalization-based Data Mining in Object-Oriented Databases using an Object Cube Model". Data & Knowledge Engineering. 25 (1–2): 55–97. CiteSeerX 10.1.1.12.6188. doi:10.1016/S0169-023X(97)00051-7.
- Hara, T.; Harumoto, K.; Tsukamoto, M.; Nishio, S. (1998). "Database Migration: A New Architecture for Transaction Processing in Broadband Networks". IEEE Transactions on Knowledge and Data Engineering. 10 (5): 839–854. doi:10.1109/TMC.2013.133. S2CID 17890717.
