= Matsudaira Shigetada =

Japanese daimyō

2nd (Nomi-Matsudaira) Daimyō of Yokosuka
- In office 1621–1622
- Preceded by: Matsudaira Shigekatsu
- Succeeded by: Inoue Masanari

Personal details
- Born: 1570
- Died: 1626 (aged 56)

Matsudaira Shigetada (松平 重忠; 1570 – August 22, 1626) was a Japanese daimyō of the Azuchi–Momoyama period to early Edo period. His court title was Tango no kami.

In 1612, Shigetada became an ōbangashira (captain of the great guard). He took part in the attack on Osaka Castle in the winter campaign of 1614, and in the defense of Fushimi Castle the following spring and summer. Shigetada was made warden of Sunpu Castle in 1621, and he became lord of the Yokosuka Domain in the same year, following the death of his father Shigekatsu. A year later, he was moved to the Kaminoyama Domain.

Shigetada died in 1626, and was succeeded by his adopted son Shigenao, son of Ogasawara Hidemasa.

Shigetada's grave is at Dentsū-in, in Tokyo.

| Preceded by Matsudaira Shigekatsu | 2nd (Nomi-Matsudaira) Daimyō of Yokosuka; 1621–1622 | Succeeded by Inoue Masanari |
| Preceded by Kaminoyama Yoshinao | First (Nomi-Matsudaira) Daimyō of Kaminoyama; 1622–1626 | Succeeded by Matsudaira Shigenao |
