= Kaminoyama Domain =

Feudal domain in Edo period Japan

Kaminoyama Domain 上山藩
- under Tokugawa shogunate Japan
- 1622–1871
- Capital: Kaminoyama Castle
  - Type: Daimyō
- Historical era: Edo period
  - Established: 1622
  - Disestablished: 1871
- Today part of: part of Yamagata Prefecture

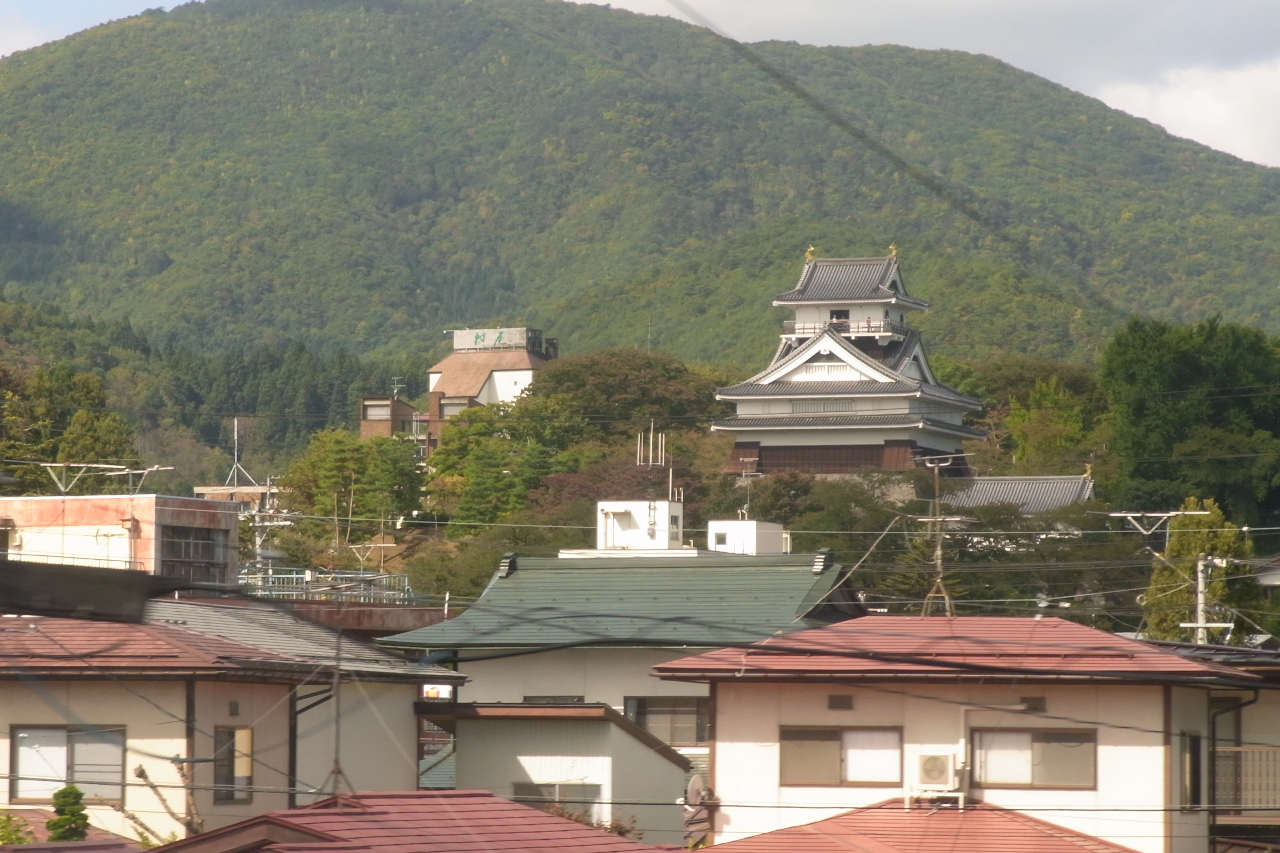
Reconstructed keep of Kaminoyama Castle

Kaminoyama Domain (上山藩, Kaminoyama han) a feudal domain in Edo period Japan, located in Dewa Province (modern-day Yamagata Prefecture), Japan. It was centered on Kaminoyama Castle in what is now the city of Kaminoyama, Yamagata.

== History ==
Kaminoyama Domain was situated on the strategic Ushū Kaidō, subroute of the Ōshū Kaidō connecting Edo with the northern portion of Honshu. The domain was sandwiched in between the powerful Yamagata Domain to the north and the Yonezawa Domain to the south.

During the Muromachi period, the area was noted as a hot spring resort and a stronghold of the Mogami clan. It was a contested territory between the Mogami and the Date clans during the Sengoku period, and later between the Mogami and the Uesugi clan. After the destruction of the Mogami clan by the Tokugawa shogunate, Kamiyama Domain (40,000 koku) was created in 1622 for Matsudaira Shigetada, who laid out the plan of the future castle town. The Matsudaira were replaced by the Gamō clan from 1626 to 1627, followed by the Toki clan from 1628 to 1691, and the Kanemori clan from 1692 to 1697. Kaminoyama Domain was then ruled by the Fujii branch of the Matsudaira clan from 1698 until the Meiji restoration. The domain had 2200 households per the 1852 census and maintained its primary Edo residence (kamiyashiki) in Azabu. The clan’s Edo temple was Tessho-ji in Nishi-Asakusa.

During the Bakumatsu period, the domain strongly supported the Tokugawa shogunate, and samurai from the domain played a key role in the attack on the Satsuma Domain residence in Edo. During the Boshin War, the domain joined the Ōuetsu Reppan Dōmei and troops from the domain were involved in the Battle of Hokuetsu, as a substantial portion of the domain’s holdings were also in Echigo Province.

After the end of the conflict, with the abolition of the han system in July 1871, Kaminoyama Domain became "Kaminoyama Prefecture", which later became part of Yamagata Prefecture.

== Bakumatsu period holdings ==
- Dewa Province (Uzen)
  - 37 villages in Murayama District
- Echigo Province
  - 21 villages in Kariwa District
  - 33 villages in Santō District

== List of daimyō ==
#	Name	Tenure	Courtesy title	Court Rank	kokudaka
Matsudaira clan (Nomi) (fudai) 1622–1626
1	Matsudaira Shigetada (松平重忠)	1622–1626	Tango-no-kami (丹後守)	Lower 5th (従五位下)	40,000 koku
2	Matsudaira Shigenao (松平重直)	1626–1626	Tango-no-kami (丹後守)	Lower 5th (従五位下)	40,000 koku
Gamō clan (tozama) 1626–1627
1	Gamō Tadatomo (蒲生忠知)	1626–1627	Nakatsuka Daiyu (中務大輔); Jijū (侍従)	Lower 4th (従四位下)	40,000 koku
Toki clan (fudai) 1628–1691
1	Toki Yoriyuki (土岐頼行)	1628–1678	Yamashiro-no-kami (山城守)	Lower 5th (従五位下)	25,000 koku
2	Toki Yoritaka (土岐頼殷)	1678–1691	Iyo-no-kami (伊予守)	Lower 4th (従四位下)	35,000 koku
Kanamori clan (tozama) 1692–1697
1	Kanamori Yoritoki (金森頼時)	1692–1697	Izuno-no-kami (出雲守)	Lower 5th (従五位下)	38,700 koku
Matsudaira clan (Fujii) (fudai) 1781–1871
1	Matsudaira Nobumichi (松平信通)	1781–1789	Etchu-no-kami (越中守)	Lower 5th (従五位下)	30,000 koku
2	Matsudaira Nagatsune (松平長恒)	1789–1812	-none-	-none-	30,000 koku
3	Matsudaira Nobumasa (松平信将)	1812–1819	Yamashiro-no-kami (山城守)	Lower 5th (従五位下)	30,000 koku
4	Matsudaira Nobutsura (松平信亨)	1820–1864	Yamashiro-no-kami (山城守)	Lower 5th (従五位下)	30,000 koku
5	Matsudaira Nobufusa (松平信古)	1864–1871	Yamashiro-no-kami (山城守)	Lower 5th (従五位下)	30,000 koku
6	Matsudaira Nobuzane (松平信愛)	1864–1871	Yamashiro-no-kami (山城守)	Lower 5th (従五位下)	30,000 koku
7	Matsudaira Nobuyuki (松平信行)	1864–1871	Yamashiro-no-kami (山城守)	Lower 5th (従五位下)	30,000 koku
8	Matsudaira Nobumichi (2) (松平信宝)	1864–1871	Yamashiro-no-kami (山城守)	Lower 5th (従五位下)	30,000 koku
9	Matsudaira Nobutsune (松平信庸)	1864–1871	Yamashiro-no-kami (山城守)	Lower 5th (従五位下)	30,000 koku
10	Matsudaira Nobuyasu (松平信安)	1864–1871	-none-	Lower 5th (従五位下)	30,000 koku
