= Tendō clan =

The Tendō clan (天童氏, Tendō-shi) was a Japanese kin group in Dewa Province during the Sengoku Period and Edo period.

== History ==
The clan claimed descent from Shiba Kaneyori.

The castle town of Tendō was the clan center.

Leaders of the clan were patrons of Hiroshige.

== See also ==
- Naomasa Nakahachi
