= Matsudaira Nobutsune (Kaminoyama) =

Japanese feudal lord (1844–1918)

- 松平 信庸
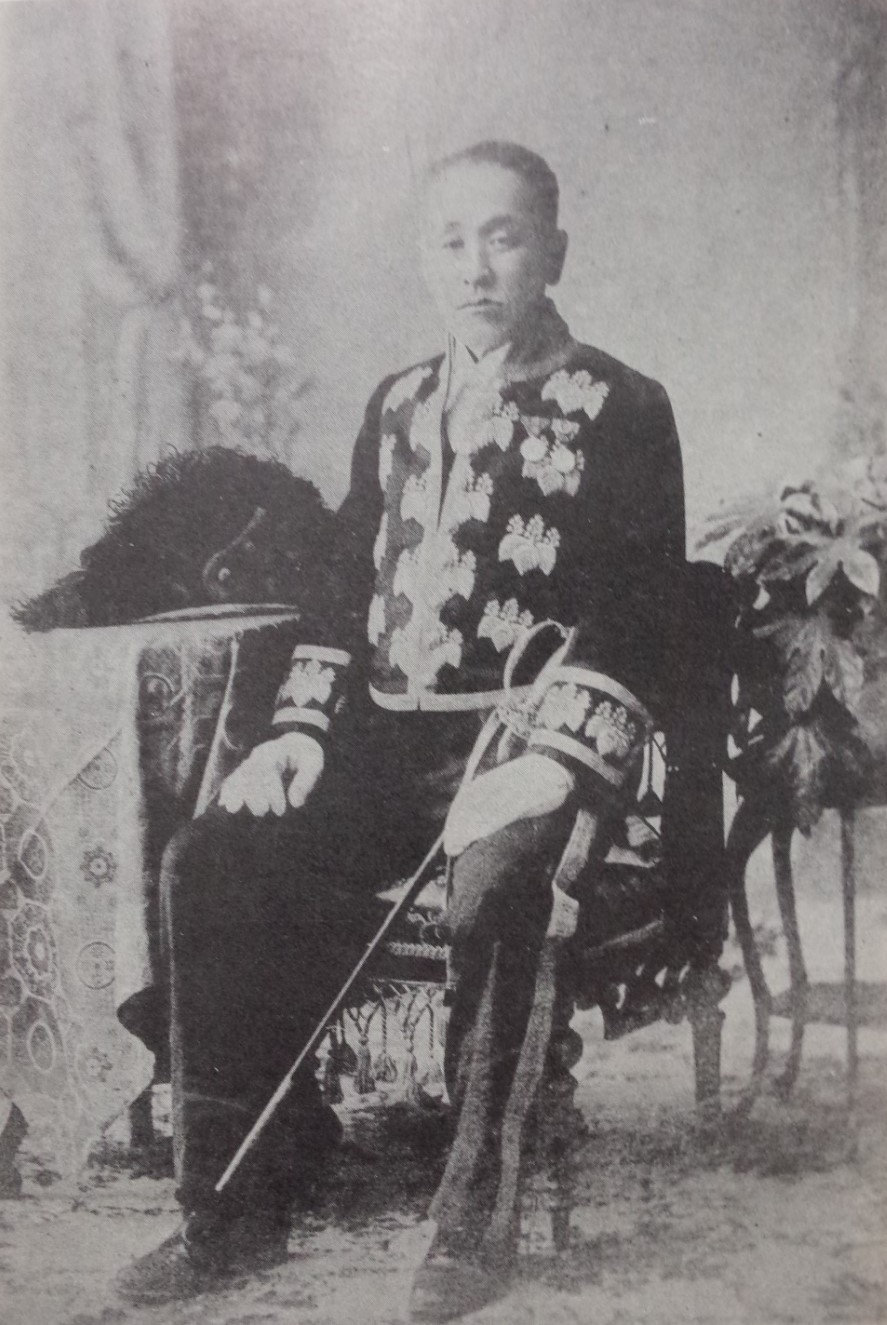
- Matsudaira Nobutsune

9th Daimyō of Kaminoyama Domain
- In office 1862–1868
- Monarchs: Shōgun: Tokugawa Iemochi; Tokugawa Yoshinobu
- Preceded by: Matsudaira Nobumichi
- Succeeded by: Matsudaira Nobuyasu

Personal details
- Born: September 22, 1844
- Died: March 5, 1918 (aged 73)
- Spouse(s): Naoko, daughter of Ogasawara Nagakuni of Karatsu Domain
- Parent: Matsudaira Nobumichi (father)

Matsudaira Nobutsune (松平 信庸; September 22, 1844 – March 5, 1918) was the 9th daimyō of Kaminoyama Domain in Dewa Province during Bakumatsu period Japan, and the 15th chieftain of the Fujii Matsudaira clan. His courtesy title was Yamashiro-no-kami.

== Biography ==
Matsudaira Nobutsune was the eldest son of Matsudaira Nobumichi, the 8th daimyō of Kaminoyama. He became daimyō on the retirement of his father in 1862. During his tenure, he is noted for building an irrigation canal. In late 1867, he was appointed commander of the shogunate forces which (together with forces from Shōnai Domain, participated in the arson attack against the Satsuma Domain residence in Mita, Edo, which was one of the flash-points for the start of then Boshin War. Kaminoyama Domain's karō, Kaneko Kiyokuni was killed in the attack. During the Boshin War, the domain was a member of the pro-Tokugawa Ōuetsu Reppan Dōmei. He surrendered to the Meiji government in September 1868 and was placed under house arrest at the clan's bodaiji of Shoko-ji in Tokyo. The domain was reduced in kokudaka by 3000 koku and Nobutsune was forced to retire in favor of his younger brother, Matsudaira Nobuyasu. He died in 1918 at the age of 75.
