= Nishio Tadaatsu =

Japanese daimyō

Nishio Tadaatsu 西尾忠篤
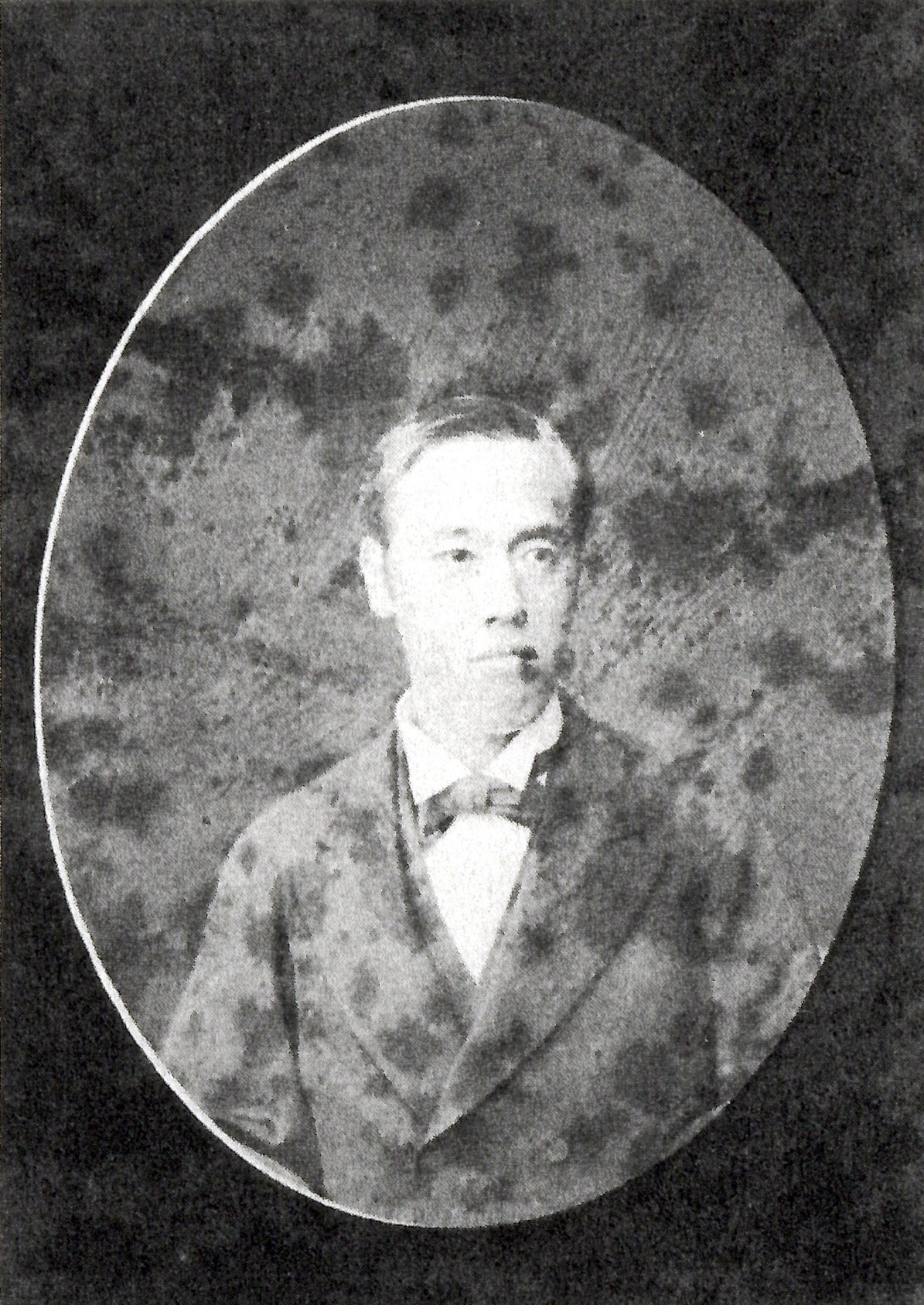
- Nishio Tadaatsu
- Born: 16 June 1850; Edo, Japan
- Died: November 5, 1910 (aged 60); Tokyo, Japan
- Other names: Oki-no-kami
- Occupation: daimyō of Yokosuka Domain
- Spouse: daughter of Matsudaira Chikayoshi

Viscount Nishio Tadaatsu (西尾 忠篤; June 16, 1850 – November 5, 1910) was the final daimyō of Yokosuka Domain in Tōtōmi Province in late-Edo period Japan, and the first (and only) daimyō of Hanabusa Domain in Awa Province in the early years of the Meiji period, and the 11th hereditary chieftain of the Yokosuka-Nishio clan.

Tadaatsu was the son of Nishio Tadasaka, the 7th daimyō of Yokosuka Domain. His mother was a daughter of Toki Yorinobu, the daimyō of Numata Domain in Kōzuke Province. He became daimyō of Yokosuka and head of the Nishio clan upon his father's death in 1861 and was received in formal audience by Shogun Tokugawa Iemochi the following year.

During the Boshin War of the Meiji Restoration, Tadaatsu's retainers were divided as to whether or not the domain should continue to support the shogunate or join forces with the Satchō Alliance in support of the new imperial government. Thanks to the persuasion of Yaso Tomiho and Aoyama Zen'ichirō, the pro-shogunate elements in Yokosuka dropped their objections, and the Yokosuka Domain peacefully submitted to the Imperial army. As a gesture of loyalty, the Yokosuka Domain contributed forces to assist the new government in its suppression of remaining pro-Tokugawa partisans in northern Japan. In 1868, due to Tokugawa Iesato's entry into the Tōkaidō region as daimyō of the newly created Sunpu Domain, the Nishio clan was transferred to the newly created Hanabusa Domain, in Awa Province , with the same nominal kokudaka. Tadaatsu ruled Hanabusa as daimyō until 1869, when he was made han chiji (imperial governor). He finally left Hanabusa after the abolition of the domains in 1871 and relocated to Tokyo. He was created a viscount under the kazoku peerage system in 1884.

Tadaatsu was married to a daughter of Matsudaira Chikayoshi, daimyō of Kitsuki Domain in Chikugo Province, and had two daughters, but no male heir.

He died in 1910, at age 61. His grave is at the temple of Myogon-ji at Ageo, Saitama.

Preceded by Nishio Tadasaka	8th Daimyō of Yokosuka; 1861-1868	Succeeded by none
Preceded by none	1st Daimyō of Hanabusa; 1868-1871	Succeeded by none
