= Nishio clan =

Nishio 西尾
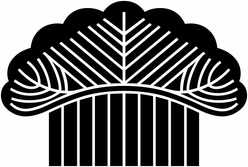
- Nishio family crest
- Home province: Mikawa Province
- Parent house: Kira clan, Seiwa Genji
- Titles: Oki-no-kami
- Founder: Nishio Yoshitsugu
- Final ruler: Nishio Tadaatsu
- Founding year: 1530
- Dissolution: 1910
- Ruled until: 1873 (Abolition of the han system)

Nishio clan (西尾氏, Nishio-shi) was a Japanese samurai kin group.

== History ==
The clan claims descent from the Kira clan, a branch of the Seiwa Genji line. Kira Yoshitsugu, a son of Kira Mochihiro, served under Oda Nobunaga, Toyotomi Hideyoshi and Tokugawa Ieyasu adopted the family name of Nishio. Under the Tokugawa shogunate, the Nishio, as hereditary vassals of the Tokugawa clan, were classified as one of the fudai daimyō clans.

Nishio Yoshitsugu was given the 12,000 koku Haraichi Domain in Musashi Province in 1602. His son, Nishio Tadanaga was transferred to the 20,000 koku Shirai Domain in Kōzuke Province in 1616, and subsequently to Tsuchiura Domain (Hitachi Province) from 1617-1649. The clan then ruled Tanaka Domain (Suruga Province) from 1649-1679, Komoro Domain (Shinano Province) from 1679-1682, and finally settled at Yokosuka Domain (Tōtōmi Province) from 1682-1868.

After the Meiji Restoration, the Nishio clan was transferred to the short-lived Hanabusa Domain in Awa Province, and was subsequently granted the kazoku title of viscount (shishaku).
