= Kakegawa Castle =

Castle in Shizuoka Prefecture, Japan

Kakegawa Castle 掛川城
- Kakegawa, Shizuoka Prefecture, Japan
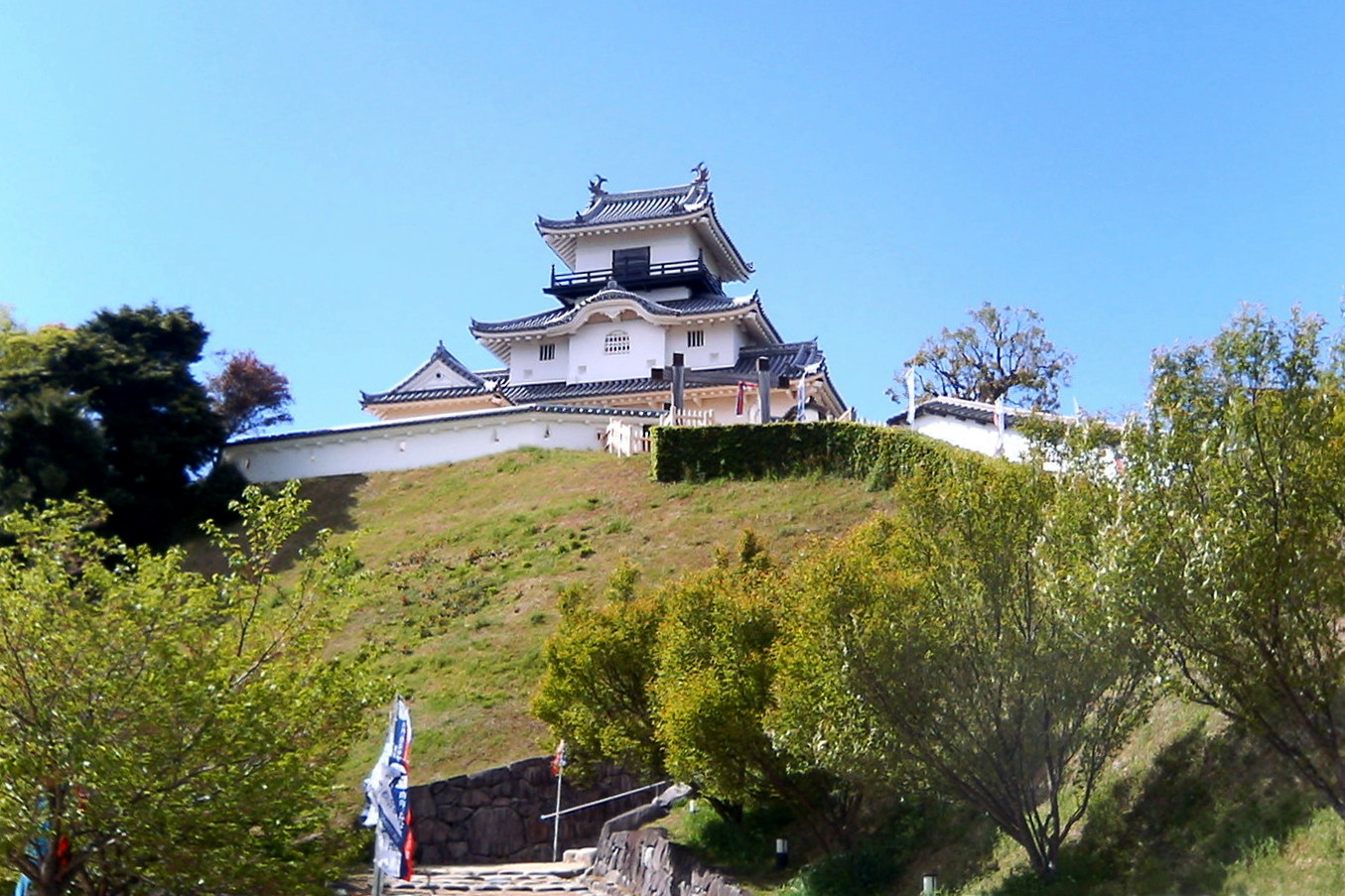
- Main keep of Kakegawa Castle

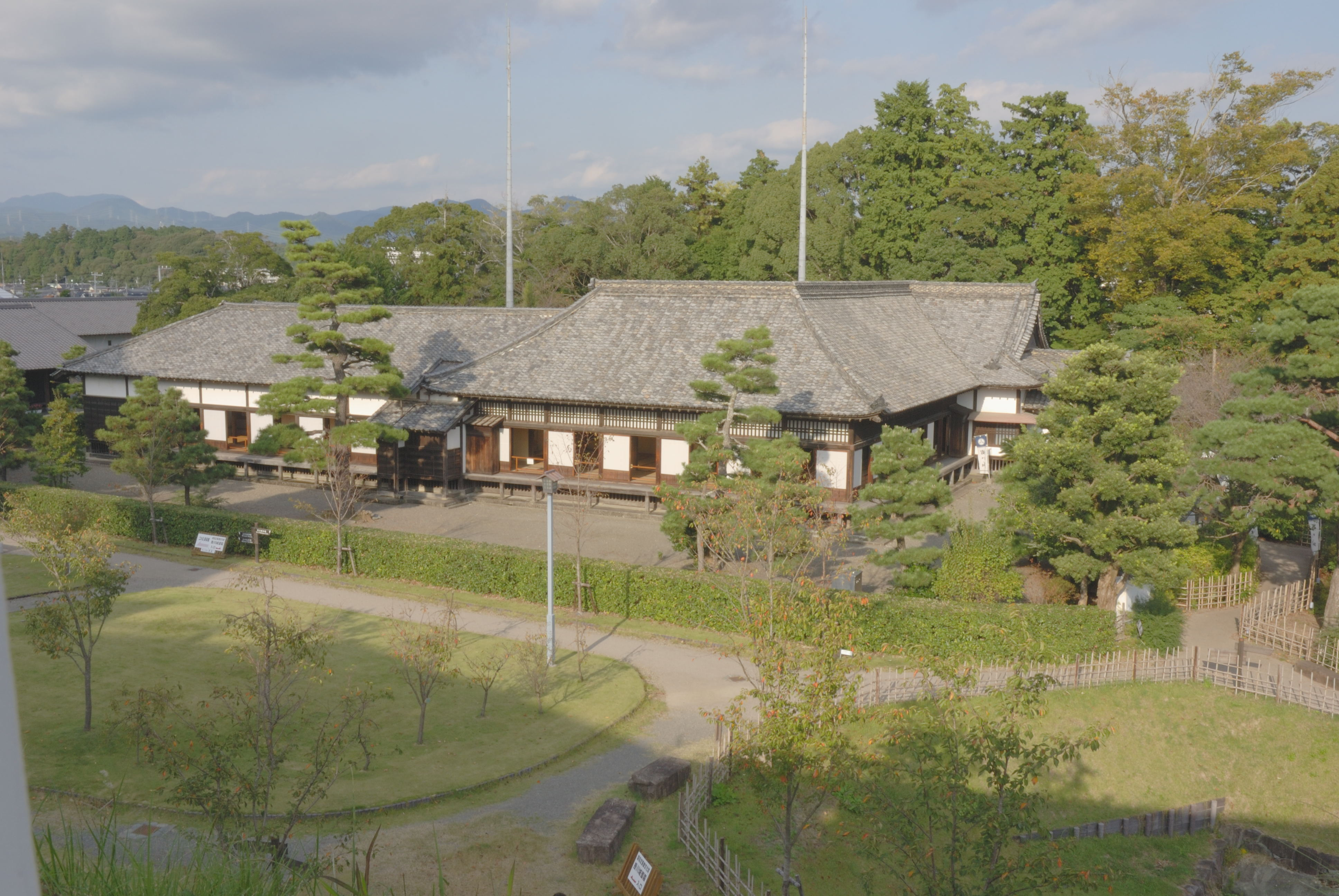
- The Ni-no-Maru Goten

Site information
- Type: Hirayama-style Japanese castle
- Open to the public: yes
- Condition: exant palace and other buildings, reconstruction of tenshu and other buildings from 1994

Location
- Location within Shizuoka Prefecture Location within Japan
- Coordinates: 34°46′32″N 138°00′53″E

Site history
- Built: 1469–1487
- Built by: Asahina Yasuhiro, Yamauchi Kazutoyo, others
- In use: Edo period
- Demolished: 1869

Kakegawa Castle (掛川城, Kakegawa-jō) is a hirayama-style Japanese castle. It was the seat of various fudai daimyō clans who ruled over Kakegawa Domain, Tōtōmi Province, in what is now central Kakegawa, Shizuoka Prefecture, Japan.

== Background ==
Kakegawa Castle is located at a small hill in the center of Kakegawa, which had been an important post station on the Tōkaidō highway connecting Kyoto with eastern Japan since the Heian period. Because of its geographical location, Kakegawa was strategic point in controlling the eastern half of Tōtōmi province.

== History ==
The first Kakegawa Castle was built by Asahina Yasuhiro in the Bunmei era (1469–1487), a retainer of the warlord Imagawa Yoshitada to consolidate his holdings over Tōtōmi Province. The castle remained in the hands of the succeeding generations of the Asahina clan. After the defeat of the Imagawa clan at the Battle of Okehazama, the former Imagawa territories were divided between Takeda Shingen of Kai and Tokugawa Ieyasu of Mikawa. Kakegawa Castle was surrendered to Tokugawa forces in 1568 by Asahina Yasutomo after a five month siege. The surrounding area remained a territory contested between the Tokugawa and Takeda for many years; however, Kakegawa Castle remained in Tokugawa hands until the fall of the Takeda clan.

After the Battle of Odawara in 1590 and the rise to power of Toyotomi Hideyoshi, Tokugawa Ieyasu was forced to trade his domains in the Tōkai region for the Kantō region instead. Kakegawa was relinquished to Toyotomi retainer Yamauchi Kazutoyo as the center of a new 51,000 koku (later 59,000 koku) domain. Yamauchi Kazutoyo completely rebuilt the castle per the latest contemporary designs, and the current layout and much of the stone walls and moats date from his period.

After the establishment of the Tokugawa shogunate, the Tokugawa recovered their lost territories, and reassigned Tōtōmi to various fudai daimyō. The Yamauchi clan was reassigned to Kōchi in Shikoku, and Kakegawa was assigned initially to Hisamatsu Sadakatsu. Over the years, numerous daimyō clans ruled Kakegawa Domain, ending with seven generations of the Ōta clan. The keep built by the Yamauchi was destroyed in an earthquake in 1604, and reconstructed in 1621.

The castle was kept in repair through the Bakumatsu period, however it suffered from extensive damage in 1854, due to the Ansei Tōkai earthquake. Many structures were rebuilt by 1861, and were in use after the Meiji Restoration as local government offices; however, the keep was not rebuilt after the earthquake.

== Today ==
Kakegawa Castle remained in ruins through the Shōwa period, with the notable exception of the Ni-no-Maru Goten (二の丸御殿) (daimyō's mansion), built by Ōta Sukekatsu after the earthquake, and registered with the government in 1980 as an Important Cultural Property.

Other surviving portions of the castle included a portion of the moats and stone walls, a guardhouse, and the drum house. A gate from the main bailey of the castle built in 1659 was given to the Buddhist temple of Yusan-ji in Fukuroi, where it now serves as the main gate of that temple. It is also a National ICP.

In April 1994, sections of the innermost bailey (honmaru), including some walls, a yagura, and the keep (tenshukaku), were reconstructed using the original methods. The tenshukaku's reconstruction was done based on a few diagrams of the original tenshukaku that survived, and marked the first time in post-war Japan that a tenshukaku had been reconstructed in wood using the original construction methods. The cost of 1 billion yen for the reconstruction was raised largely through public donation. In 2006, the site of Kakegawa Castle was listed as No. 42 of the 100 Fine Castles of Japan by the Japan Castle Foundation, primarily due to its historical significance.
