= Ōta Suketoki =

Japanese daimyō

- 太田資言
- Born: 1769
- Died: July 3, 1810 (aged 40–41)
- Occupation: Daimyō

Ōta Suketoki (太田 資言; 1769 – July 3, 1810) was the 4th Ōta daimyō of Kakegawa Domain in Tōtōmi Province, (modern-day Shizuoka Prefecture) in mid-Edo period Japan.

== Biography ==
Ōta Suketoki was the fourth son of Ōta Sukeyoshi, the 2nd Ōta daimyō of Kakegawa Domain, by a concubine. As his elder brother Ōta Sukenobu died in 1808 without a male heir, he inherited the leadership of the Ōta clan and position of daimyō of Kakegawa.

However, Ōta Suketoki died only two years later at the relatively young age of 42. Although he was married to a daughter of Makino Tadakiyo, daimyō of Nagaoka Domain in Echigo Province, he had only one daughter, and the domain passed to his son-in-law on his death.

His grave is at the Ōta clan temple of Myōhokke-ji in Mishima, Shizuoka.

Preceded by Ōta Sukenobu	Daimyō of Kakegawa; 1808–1810	Succeeded by Ōta Sukemoto
