= Ōta Suketoshi =

Daimyo

Ōta Suketoshi 太田資俊
- Born: 1720
- Died: January 12, 1764 (aged 43–44); Kakegawa, Japan
- Other names: Settsu-no-kami
- Occupation: Daimyō

Ōta Suketoshi (太田 資俊; 1720 – January 12, 1764) was a daimyō during mid-Edo period Japan and fifth hereditary chieftain of the Kakegawa-Ōta clan. His courtesy title was Settsu-no-kami.

== Biography ==
Ōta Suketoshi was the son of Ōta Sukeharu, the daimyō of Tatebayashi Domain in Kōzuke Province. He inherited the leadership of the Ōta clan on his father's death in 1734, but was not confirmed in the position of daimyō of Tatebayashi Domain until 1740. He entered into the administration of the Tokugawa shogunate by serving as sōshaban at Edo Castle. On September 25, 1746 was reassigned from Tatebayashi to Kakegawa Domain in Tōtōmi Province, (modern-day Shizuoka Prefecture) replacing Ogasawara Nagayuki. He subsequently was appointed to the position of Jisha-bugyō. He died at Kakegawa on January 12, 1716, leaving the domain to his son, Ōta Sukeyoshi. His grave is at the Ōta clan bodaiji of Myōhokke-ji in Mishima, Shizuoka.

Ōta Suketoshi was married to an adopted daughter of Itakura Shigeharu, daimyō of Ise-Kameyama Domain.

Preceded by Ogasawara Nagayuki	Daimyō of Tatebayashi; 1740–1746	Succeeded by Matsudaira Takechika
Preceded by Ogasawara Nagayuki	Daimyō of Kakegawa; 1746–1763	Succeeded by Ōta Sukeyoshi
