= Ōta Sukenobu =

Japanese daimyō

- 太田資順
- Born: 1762
- Died: November 24, 1808 (aged 45–46)
- Occupation: Daimyō of Kakegawa Domain

Ōta Sukenobu (太田 資順; 1762 – November 24, 1808) was the 3rd daimyō of Kakegawa Domain in Tōtōmi Province, (modern-day Shizuoka Prefecture) in mid-Edo period Japan and seventh hereditary chieftain of the Kakegawa-Ōta clan.

== Biography ==
Ōta Sukenobu was the second son of Ōta Sukeyoshi, the previous daimyō of Kakegawa Domain, by a concubine. As his elder brother Ōta Suketake died in 1785, he inherited the leadership of the Ōta clan and position of daimyō of Kakegawa Domain on the death of his father in 1805. The following year, he was appointed as sōshaban at Edo Castle in the service of Shōgun Tokugawa Ienari.

However, he died only three years later at the relatively young age of 47. Although he was married to a daughter of Niwa Takayasu of Nihonmatsu Domain in Mutsu Province and his concubine was a daughter of Honda Tadayoshi of Yamazaki Domain in Harima Province, he had only one daughter, and the domain passed to his adopted younger brother Ōta Suketoki on his death.

His grave is at the clan bodaiji of Myōhokke-ji in Mishima, Shizuoka.

Preceded by Ōta Sukeyoshi	Daimyō of Kakegawa; 1763–1805	Succeeded by Ōta Suketoki
