= Ōta Dōkan =

15th-century Japanese samurai, poet, military tactician and Buddhist monk

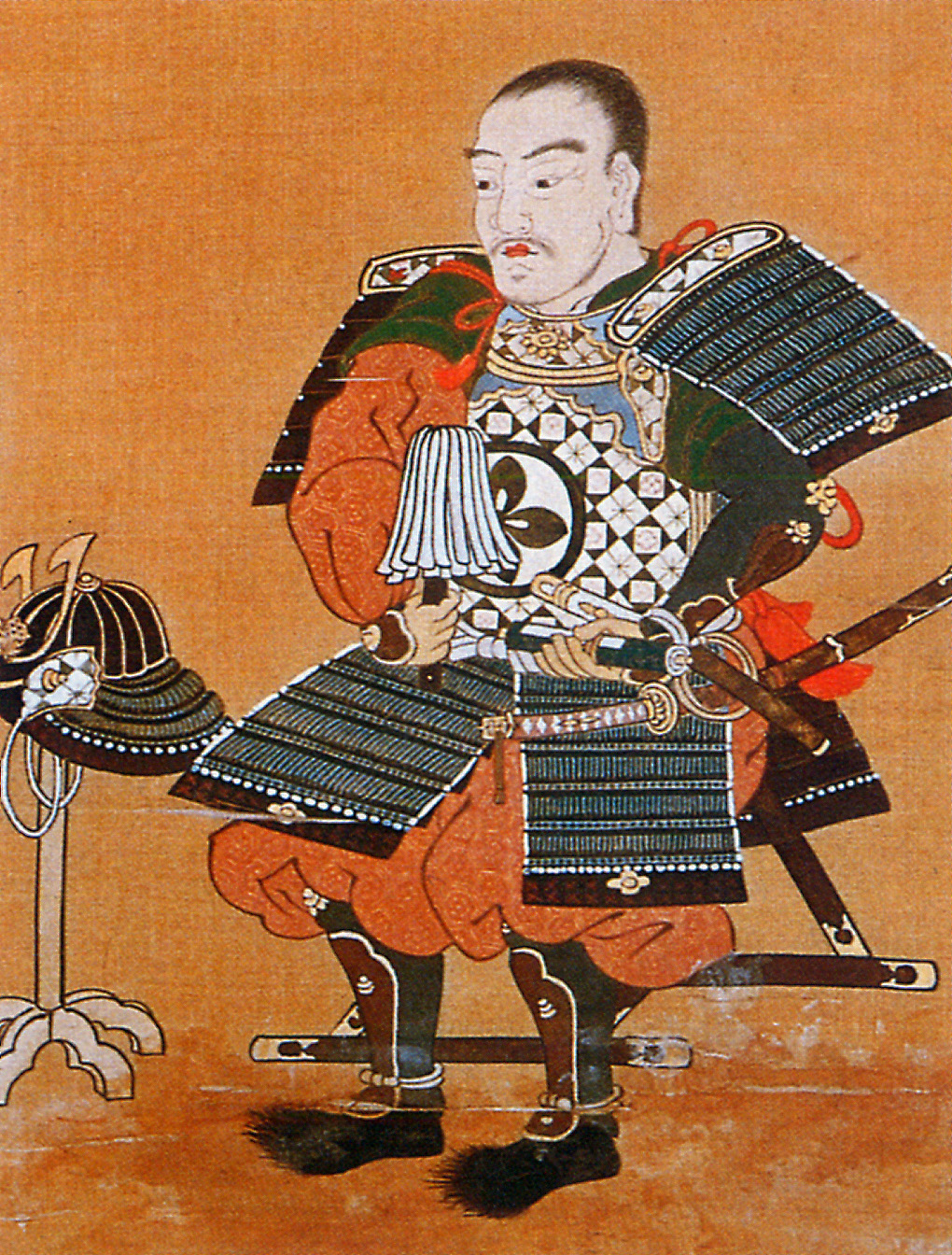
Portrait of Ōta Dōkan

Ōta Dōkan (太田 道灌; Japanese pronunciation: [oː.ta (|) doꜜː.kaɴ], 1432 - August 25, 1486), also known as Ōta Sukenaga (太田 資長), was a Japanese samurai lord, poet and Buddhist monk. He took the tonsure as a Buddhist priest in 1478, and he also adopted the Buddhist name, Dōkan, by which he is known today. Dōkan is best known as the architect and builder of Edo Castle (now the Imperial Palace) in what is today modern Tokyo; and he is considered the founder of the castle town which grew up around that Ōnin era fortress.

== Ōta clan genealogy ==
The Ōta clan originated in 15th-century Musashi Province. They claimed descent from Minamoto no Yorimasa, and through that branch of the Minamoto they claimed kinship with the Seiwa-Genji.

The feudal progenitor of the clan name, Ōta Sukekuni, established himself at Ōta in Tanba Province, and he adopted this location name as his own. He traced his lineage as a fifth-generation descendant of Yorimasa.

In a special context created by the Tokugawa shogunate, the Ōta clan were identified as tozama or outsiders, in contrast with the fudai or insider daimyō clans which were hereditary vassals or allies of the Tokugawas.

In, 1638, Ōta Sukemune, the grandson of Ōta Yasusuke, was granted Nishio Domain in Mikawa Province; and then, in 1645, he and his family was transferred to Hamamatsu Domain (35,000 koku) in Tōtōmi Province. Yasusuke's descendants were moved several times by shogunate decree, residing successively in 1687 at Tanaka Domain in Suruga Province, in 1703 at Tanakura Domain in Mutsu Province, and in 1728 at Tatebayashi Domain in Kōzuke Province. Then, in the period spanning the years 1746 through 1868, this branch of the Ōta clan established itself at Kakegawa Domain (53,000 koku) in Tōtōmi.

The head of this clan line was ennobled as a "Viscount" in the Meiji period.

== Events of Dōkan's life ==
Although born into the Ōta clan—and claimed by the Ōta as a clan celebrity—Dōkan served as a vassal of the Ōgigayatsu branch of the Uesugi clan which occupied land in the Kantō region of Honshū.

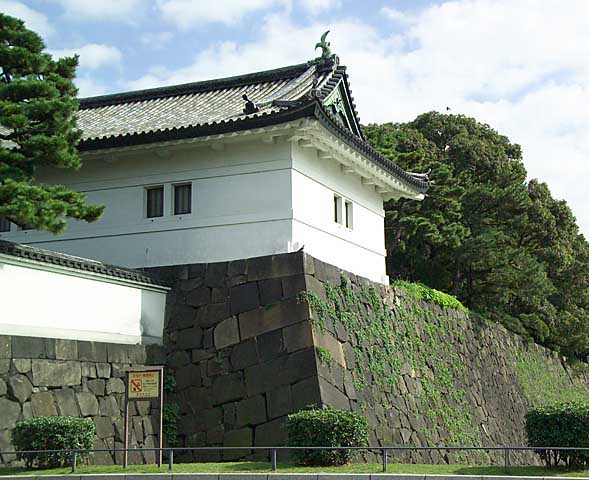
A portion of Edo Castle, built by the Tokugawa shogunate and successor to Dōkan’s castle.

Dōkan is credited with designing and building Edo Castle for Uesugi Sadamasa (1443–1494) over the fortifications Edo Shigenaga had earlier built. Work on the defensive walls and moats began in 1457; and he took the name Dōkan the following year.

Ōgigayatsu Uesugi Mochitomo ordered Ōta Michizane and Dōkan to construct fortifications at Kawagoe in 1457.

As a military strategist, he is reputed to have been an effective tactician; but political intrigues can be as deadly as any battle. Despite years of distinguished service, the Uesugi clan leader proved fickle. Dōkan met an untimely end at Uesugi Sadamasa's home in Sagami (modern-day Kanagawa) after he was falsely accused of disloyalty during a period when the Uesugi family struggled through an internal clan conflict. His death poem is as follows:

Kakaru toki
sakoso inochi no
oshikarame
kanete nakimi to
omoishirazuba

Translation:

Had I not known
that I was dead
already
I would have mourned
the loss of my life.

— Translated by Yoel Hoffmann

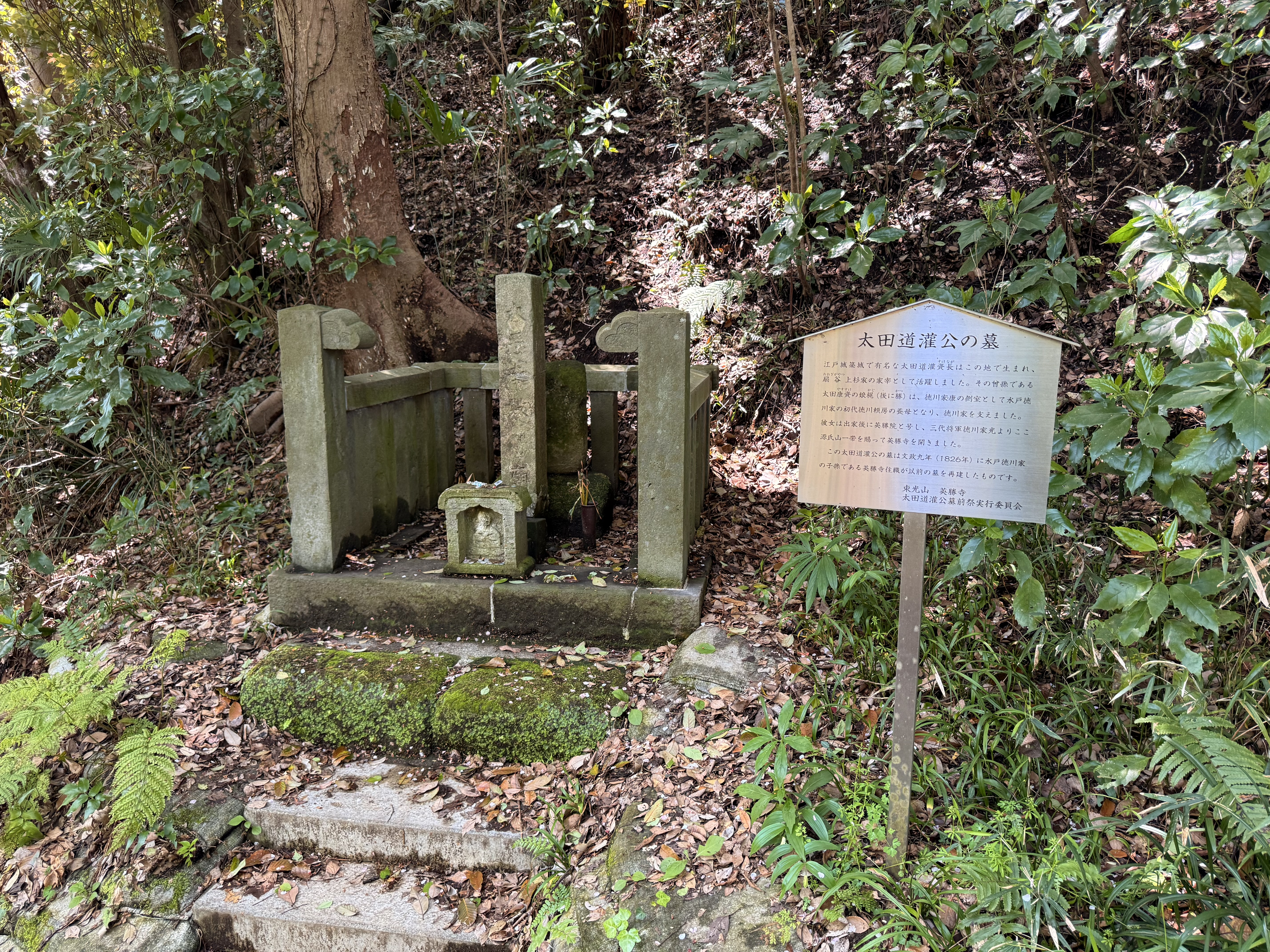
Tomb site of Ōta Dōkan in Kamakura, Japan

Following his death, the castle was then abandoned until it was taken over by Ieyasu in 1590.

Dōkan was also well-read in classical (Heian period) literature; and like other samurai of his time, Dōkan was said to have been a skilled poet, but only fragments attributed to him have survived.

Dōkan is also credited with having selected the site of the Hikawa Shrine, which is dedicated to Sugawara no Michizane, the kami of poetry and scholarship. Hikawa Shrine is located very near Edo Castle.

== Legacy ==
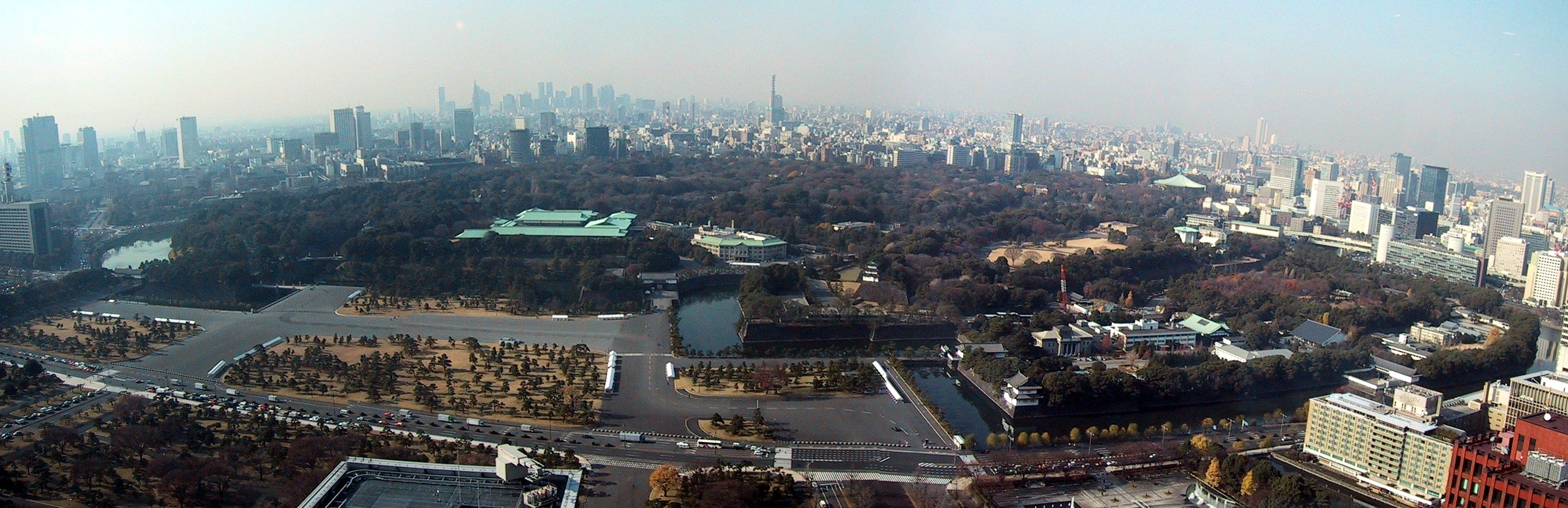
Contemporary panoramic view of the Imperial Palace which today occupies the location which Ōta Dōkan selected and fortified in 1457. The Tokyo sky and skyline are much changed, but part of Dōkan's moat is preserved as a notable element of the site's past and present.

Dōkan's residence in Kamakura became Eishō-ji, a Buddhist temple. The temple complex was founded by Okaji, a daughter of Ōta Yasusuke who would have been one of Dōkan's great-great-grandsons. Okaji was one of Tokugawa Ieyasu's attendants, and she later became a foster mother to Tokugawa Yorifusa (1603–61), the founder of the Mito branch of the Tokugawa family. After Ieyasu's death, Okatsu became a nun, taking the name Eishoin. The third shōgun, Tokugawa Iemitsu (1604–51), granted her the property her ancestors had once owned. In 1636, Eishoin had a temple built and she invited a daughter of Yorifusa to join her. Eisho-ji's prosperity helped preserve the memory of the 15th century ancestor who once lived in the same place.

In the late 16th century, Dōkan's Edo Castle was chosen as the new home of Tokugawa Ieyasu, who had been persuaded by Toyotomi Hideyoshi to transfer the seat of his clan holdings into the Kantō. With the establishment of the Tokugawa shogunate in the early 17th century, Edo Castle became the center of the shogunate government. When the shogunate was displaced in the Meiji Restoration in the late 19th century, the newly named Tokyo became an Imperial capital with an Imperial Palace rising from the former shōgun's stronghold. Every October 1, modern Tokyo celebrates the anniversary of its founding, which becomes a festival in honor of the memory of the samurai who would become honored as the founder of a great city.

The city of Isehara celebrates Dōkan's contributions to the area with the annual Dōkan festival each summer.

Dōkan's 15th century poetic description of what was once just a fortified hill on the Sumida River near Edo Bay would become the basis for metropolitan Tokyo Governor Ryokichi Minobe's 1971 re-election slogan: "Give Tokyo back its blue sky!"

The abode of mine
Adjoins a pine grove
Sitting on the blue sea
And from its humble eaves
Commands a view of soaring Fuji.

Instead of stone walls, the defense works around the 15th-century castle were only grassy embankments, and the structures inside them were not grand. The initial enclosure which served as the castle's core area, the space which would have been Dōkan's hon-maru, was modestly sized; but the moats were extensive for that time period. These moats and their locations would figure prominently in the serial phases of construction and development which followed.

Dōkan is also credited with diverting the Hira River east at Kandabashi to create the Nihonbashi River.

Celebrations attending the 500th Anniversary of Greater Tokyo illuminated parts of the story of Dōkan's life and achievements; and since that time, he has remained a well-known figure in modern popular culture.

== See also ==
- Nakajima Utako
