= Ōta Sukeyoshi =

Ōta Sukeyoshi may refer to:

- Ōta Sukeyoshi (I) (1739–1805), daimyō of Kakegawa Domain
- Ōta Sukeyoshi (II) (1854–1913), daimyō of Kakegawa Domain
