= Ōta Sukeyoshi (II) =

Ōta Sukeyoshi 太田資美
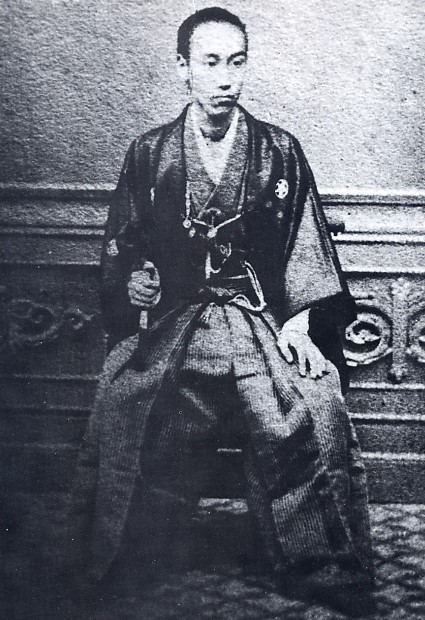
- Born: March 22, 1854
- Died: December 28, 1913 (aged 59); Tokyo, Japan
- Occupation: Daimyō of Kakegawa Domain

Ōta Sukeyoshi (太田 資美; March 22, 1854 – December 28, 1913) was the 7th (and final) daimyō of Kakegawa Domain in Tōtōmi Province, (part of modern-day Shizuoka Prefecture) in Bakumatsu period Japan and the 11th hereditary chieftain of the Kakegawa-Ōta clan. His courtesy title was Bitchu-no-kami.

== Biography ==
Ōta Sukeyoshi was the 7th son of Ōta Sukemoto, the 5th daimyō of Kakegawa Domain. He became head of the Ōta clan and daimyō of Kakegawa on the death of his elder brother, Ōta Sukekatsu in January 1862, but was only a child of eight years at the time. His father, Ōta Sukemoto, although officially retired from public life, continued to control the domain until his death in June 1867. In January 1868, he was ordered to assist in the defense of Sunpu Castle; however, with the start of the Boshin War, he withdraw to Kakegawa less than a month later, and surrendered to the new Meiji government.

In May 1868, with the Meiji Restoration, Shōgun Tokugawa Yoshinobu was forced to resign his office, and the Tokugawa clan under the leadership of Tokugawa Iesada was given the provinces of Suruga, Tōtōmi and a portion of Mikawa Province as compensation. The Ōta clan was reassigned to a new domain in Kazusa Province called Shibayama Domain in July of the same year with the same nominal kokudaka of 53,350 koku. In 1869, he became imperial governor of Shibayama under the Meiji government. During his short tenure, he established a han school and hospital, and attempted to set the foundation for the new domain by sponsoring industries. In January 1871, he completed Matsuo Castle in Shibayama and relocated his seat from Kakegawa; however, with the abolition of the han system half a year later, he relocated to Tokyo.

In December 1876, he received a post within the Imperial Household Ministry. After the establishment of the kazoku peerage system in 1884, he became a viscount (shishaku). Ōta Sukeyoshi later provided financial support for foreign educators to come to Japan, including the American missionary Christofer Carrothers at Keio Gijuku in Tokyo, the forerunner of Keio University. He was also supporter of La Société de Langue Française, the forerunner of Hosei University.

His wife was a daughter of the rōjū Manabe Akikatsu of Sabae Domain His grave is at the Ōta bodaiji of Hongyō-ji in Nippori, Tokyo.

Preceded by Ōta Sukekatsu	Daimyō of Kakegawa; 1862–1868	Succeeded by none
Preceded by -none-	Daimyō of Shibayama; 1868–1871	Succeeded by none
