= Hisamatsu Sadakatsu =

Sengoku and Edo-period Japanese daimyō

Matsudaira Sadakatsu
- 松平 定勝
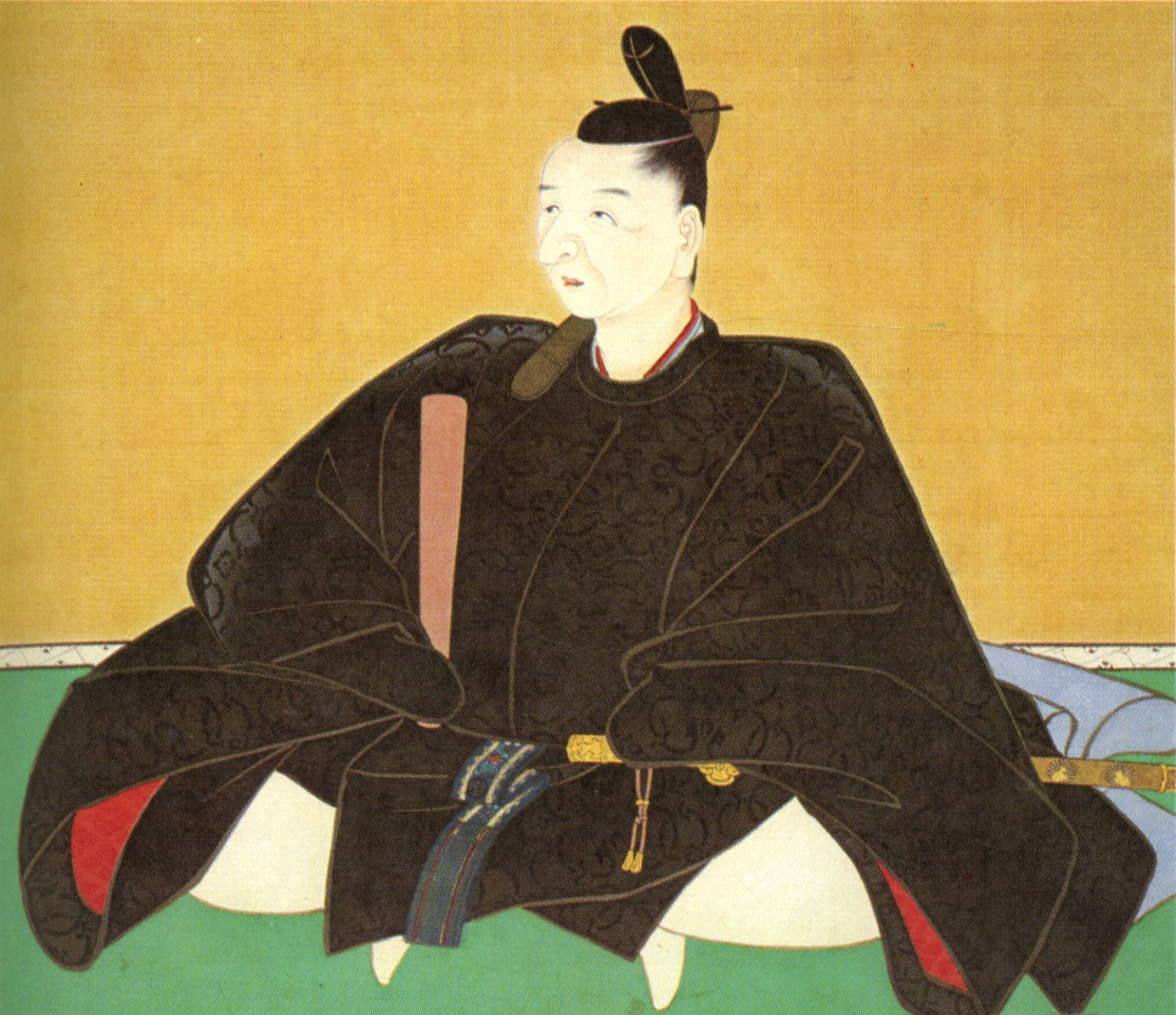

1st Daimyō of Kakegawa (Hisamatsu-Matsudaira)
- In office 1601-1607
- Preceded by: none
- Succeeded by: Matsudaira Sadayuki

1st Daimyō of Fushimi (Hisamatsu-Matsudaira)
- In office 1607-1616
- Preceded by: none
- Succeeded by: Naitō Nobumasa

1st Daimyō of Kuwana (Hisamatsu-Matsudaira)
- In office 1616-1624
- Preceded by: Honda Tadamasa
- Succeeded by: Matsudaira Sadayuki

Personal details
- Born: Nagafuku-maru (長福丸); Eiroku year 3, month 1 (1560)
- Died: Kan'ei year 1, month 3, day 14 (1624)
- Resting place: Eastern Shōgenji, Kuwana city, Mie Prefecture
- Spouse: Tatsu (adopted daughter of Okudaira Nobumasa)
- Children: Matsuo; Matsudaira Sadayoshi; Matsudaira Sadayuki; Matsudaira Sadatsuna; Kuma-hime; Matsudaira Sadazane; Kii-gimi; Matsudaira Sadafusa; Kiku; Matsudaira Sadamasa; Tsuru; Tama
- Parent(s): Hisamatsu Toshikatsu (father); Odai no Kata (mother)
- Relatives: Tokugawa Ieyasu (half-brother)

Military service
- Allegiance: Tokugawa shogunate Hisamatsu clan Hisamatsu-Matsudaira clan
- Rank: Director of Oki, Junior Fifth Rank 従五位下隠岐守; Left Imperial Guard Major General, Junior Fourth Rank 従四位下左近衛権少将

Matsudaira Sadakatsu (松平 定勝; 1560 – May 1, 1624), also known as Hisamatsu Sadakatsu (久松 定勝), was a Japanese daimyō and military commander of the early Edo period, who served the Tokugawa clan. He was the half-brother of Tokugawa Ieyasu and a founding member of the Hisamatsu-Matsudaira clan. His father was Hisamatsu Toshikatsu and his mother was Odai no Kata, Tokugawa Ieyasu's mother.

== Life ==
Sadakatsu was born in the first month of the third year of Eiroku (1560), the fourth son of Hisamatsu Toshikatsu, in Sakabe Castle, Owari Province (modern-day Agui, Aichi Prefecture). Shortly after his birth, Matsudaira Motoyasu (later known as Tokugawa Ieyasu), his half-brother, bestowed the Matsudaira family name and crest upon Sadakatsu, in recognition of his family's service in the battles of Nagashino and Tenmokuzan.

In the twelfth year of Tenshō (1584), Sadakatsu was the first to arrive on the scene during the Siege of Kanie, part of the Battle of Komaki and Nagakute. After the battles, Hashiba (later Toyotomi) Hideyoshi, in direct opposition to Ieyasu, demanded that Sadakatsu be adopted into the Hashiba clan; this was forestalled at the request of Odai no Kata, both Sadakatsu and Ieyasu's birth mother. Of Odai no Kata's children, Matsudaira Yasumoto (the eldest son) was constantly away from home, and Matsudaira Yasutoshi (the second son) had formerly been a hostage of both the Imagawa and the Takeda, having lost both his toes as a result; the desolation of being unable to stay beside her children led her to refuse sending her youngest son, Sadakatsu, to another family. Ultimately, Ieyasu's second son, Yūki Hideyasu (called Ogimaru at the time), became Hideyoshi's adopted son in Sadakatsu's stead; it was said that Ieyasu shunned Sadakatsu for some time because of this.

At the time when Okudaira Nobumasa became the son-in-law of Ieyasu and thereby a vassal to the Tokugawa, several members of the Okudaira family, including Nobumasa's younger brother and adopted daughter, had been sent as hostages to the Takeda. Following the Battle of Nagashino (in which the Tokugawa were victorious over the Takeda), Ieyasu decreed that the daughter of Nobumasa be introduced as the wife of Sadakatsu. Upon their marriage, Sadakatsu's wife's younger brother, Okudaira Sadayoshi, and uncle were transferred into the new family.

In the third month of the fifteenth year of Tenshō (1587), Sadakatsu's father Toshikatsu died in Okazaki Castle, Mikawa Province, and was interred in Anraku-ji Temple in Mikawa.

In the ninth month of the eighteenth year of Tenshō (1590), Sadakatsu was granted a 3,000-koku domain in Shimōsa Province, near modern-day Tōnoshō, Chiba Prefecture.

In the fifth year of Keichō (1600), Sadakatsu was granted a 4,000-koku domain increase and became the head of Nagashima Castle in Ise Province, followed by another domain increase of 20,000 koku.

In the second month of the following year (1601), Sadakatsu received a 3,000-koku domain increase and replaced Yamauchi Kazutoyo as head of Kakegawa Domain in Tōtōmi Province. Three months later, he was invested with the title of Junior Fifth Rank, Director of Oki Province, which became a hereditary title for the Matsudaira based in Iyo-Matsuyama Domain, Iyo Province.

In the third month of the seventh year of Keichō (1602), Tokugawa Ieyasu's tenth son (eventually named Yorinobu) was born in Fushimi Castle, Yamashiro Province. Ieyasu commanded Sadakatsu to confer his childhood name, Choufuku-maru, to the newborn child; this name thereby became that of a legitimate heir of the Kishū Tokugawa family. In the eighth month of the same year, Odai no Kata died in Fushimi Castle, after which her funeral procession was escorted from the castle.

In the fifth month of the tenth year of Keichō (1605), Sadakatsu's daughter Kuma-hime was adopted by Ieyasu and married to Yamauchi Tadayoshi. Ieyasu bequeathed him the 1000-koku domain of Yamada township in Bungo Province as a dowry.

In the twelfth year of Keichō (1607), Sadakatsu was installed as the ruler of Fushimi Castle.

In the first year of Genna (1615), Sadakatsu advanced to the post of Junior Fourth Rank.

In the third year of Genna (1617), Sadakatsu received a domain increase of 60,000 koku in Kuwana Domain, Ise Province, becoming the castle lord of a domain worth 110,000 koku. One theory states that in the following year, at the time of Ieyasu's death in Sunpu Castle, he willed that Sadakatsu serve as an advisor to his successor, Tokugawa Hidetada; furthermore, the third shōgun, Tokugawa Iemitsu, may have been aware of Sadakatsu's existence in his establishment of the position of Tairō.

Following Ieyasu's death, Sadakatsu received the respect of Hidetada; in the seventh month of the ninth year of Genna (1623), Hidetada appointed Sadakatsu to a position on the jijuushoku (board of chamberlains), which he declined. Two months later, Sadakatsu was bestowed the title of Major General of the Left Imperial Guard (左近衛権少将).

Sadakatsu died as the castle lord of Kuwana on the fourteenth day of the third month of Kan'ei (1624), at the age of 65. He was interred at Shōgen-ji in Kuwana. His mortuary tablets were enshrined in Denzuu-in temple in Edo, and later in Dairin-ji temple in Matsuyama and the now-abandoned temple of Shogen-in in Imabari.

In 1823, Sadakatsu's descendant, 11th-generation Matsudaira clan member Matsudaira Sadamichi, bestowed him with the divine title of Okinakasakitama-no-mikoto and transferred his enshrinement to Shinonome Shrine at Matsuyama Castle. This title was later changed to Shinonome-daimyōjin ("great deity of Shinonome").

Sadakatsu's descendant Matsudaira Sadatomo (b. 1944) has served as a freelance TV announcer for the NHK.

== Genealogy ==
- Legal wife: Tatsu (a.k.a. Ninomaru-dono; adopted daughter of Okudaira Nobumasa, second daughter of Okudaira Sadatomo)
  - Eldest daughter: Matsuo (Tenshō 10 - Kan'ei 12, 1582-1635) - adopted daughter of Tokugawa Ieyasu, legal wife of Hattori Masanari
  - Eldest son: Matsudaira Sadayoshi (Tenshō 13 - Keichō 8, 1585-1603)
  - Second son: Matsudaira Sadayuki (Tenshō 15 - Kanbun 8, 1587-1668)
  - Third son: Matsudaira Sadatsuna (Tenshō 20 - Keian 5, 1592-1652)
  - Second daughter: Kuma-hime (Bunroku 4 - Kan'ei 9, 1595-1632) - adopted by Ieyasu, legal wife of Yamauchi Tadayoshi
  - Fourth son: Matsudaira Sadazane (Keichō 2 - Kan'ei 9, 1597-1632)
  - Third daughter: Kii (birth unknown - Genroku 2, ?-1689) - adopted by Ieyasu, legal wife of Nakagawa Hisamori
  - Fourth daughter: Kiku (Keichō 8 - Enpō 5, 1603-1677) - legal wife of Sakai Tadayuki
  - Fifth son: Matsudaira Sadafusa (Keichō 9 - Enpō 4, 1604-1676)
- Concubine: Muraji
  - Sixth daughter: Tama (birth unknown - Enpō 7, ?-1679) - legal wife of Ikeda Tsunemoto
- Disputed heritage:
  - Sixth son: Matsudaira Sadamasa (Keichō 15 - Kanbun 12, 1610-1673)
  - Fifth daughter: Tsuru (Keichō 15 - Shōhō 2, 1610-1645) - second wife of Abe Shigetsugu
