= Ōta Sukekatsu =

Japanese daimyō

Ōta Sukekatsu 太田資功
- Born: June 24, 1827
- Died: February 12, 1862 (aged 34)
- Occupation: Daimyō of Kakegawa Domain

Ōta Sukekatsu (太田 資功; June 24, 1827 – February 12, 1862) was the 6th daimyō of Kakegawa Domain in Tōtōmi Province, (modern-day Shizuoka Prefecture) in late-Edo period Japan and 10th hereditary chieftain of the Kakegawa-Ōta clan.

== Biography ==
Ōta Sukekatsu was the eldest son of Ōta Sukemoto, the 5th daimyō of Kakegawa Domain. He was received in formal audience by Shogun Tokugawa Ieyoshi in March 1841 and became head of the Ōta clan and daimyō of Kakegawa on his father's retirement on June 10 of the same year. He was appointed to the offices of sōshaban in 1847 and Jisha-bugyō in 1849, but resigned from his posts in 1856 due to ill health. He predeceased his father, dying in 1862 at the age of 34.

Ōta Sukekatsu was married to a daughter of the rōjū Aoyama Tadanaga, of Sasayama Domain and is known to have had at least one daughter (who married Itakura Katsusuke of Bitchū-Matsuyama Domain). However, on his death, the position of daimyō of Kakegawa went to his younger brother, Ōta Sukeyoshi.

His grave is at the Ōta clan bodaiji of Myōhokke-ji in Mishima, Shizuoka.

Preceded by Ōta Sukemoto	Daimyō of Kakegawa; 1841-1862	Succeeded by Ōta Sukeyoshi
