= Nagashima Domain =

Nagashima Domain 長島藩
- under Tokugawa shogunate Japan
- 1601–1871
- Capital: Nagashima Castle
- Area
  - Coordinates: 35°5′34.5″N 136°41′52.1″E
  - Type: Daimyō
- Historical era: Edo period
  - Established: 1601
  - Disestablished: 1871
- Today part of: part of Mie Prefecture

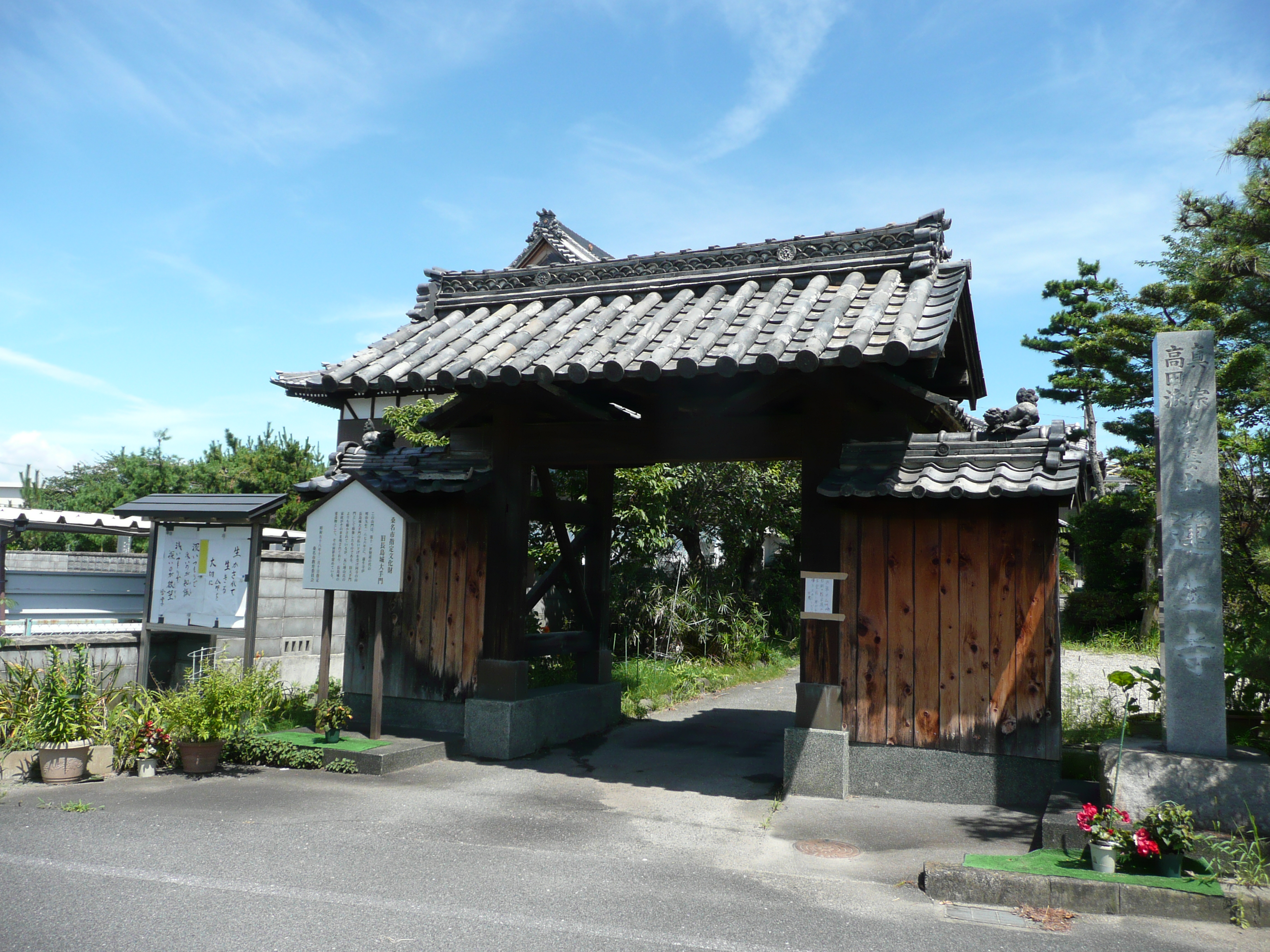
Surviving gate of Nagashima Castle

Nagashima Domain (長島藩, Nagashima-han) was a Fudai feudal domain under the Tokugawa shogunate of Edo period Japan. It was located in northern Ise Province, in the Kansai region of central Honshu. The domain was centered at Nagashima Castle, located in what is now the city of Kuwana in Mie Prefecture.

== History ==
Nagashima is an alluvial island between the Nagara River and the Kiso River at the head of Ise Bay. During the Sengoku period, the Nagashima area was a stronghold of the Ikkō-ikki movement and became infamous as the location of a massacre of 20,000 Ikkō followers by the forces of Oda Nobunaga in 1574. The territory was of strategic importance on the Tōkaidō highway to Kyoto and was held at various times by Takigawa Kazumasa, Oda Nobukatsu, Toyotomi Hidetsugu and Fukushima Takaharu (the younger brother of Fukushima Masanori). Following the Battle of Sekigahara, Nagashima Domain was established under the Tokugawa shogunate with a kokudaka of 20,000 koku and was assigned to the Suganuma clan, a fudai clan originally from Suruga Province. Under the 2nd daimyō, Suganuma Sadayoshi, Nagashima Castle was rebuilt, the foundations for the castle town were laid out, and new paddy fields were constructed. However, he died without heir in 1643, and the domain reverted to tenryō status under the direct control of the shogunate.

In 1649, Nagashima Domain was reestablished as a 10,000 koku holding for a cadet branch of the Matsudaira clan. The domain suffered greatly at this time due to massive flooding, crop failures, and peasant uprisings over high taxation. Under Hisamatsu Tadamitsu, three of his senior retainers were forced to commit seppuku and their families were executed, forcing the shogunate to intervene and declare Tadamitsu insane in 1702.

Nagashima Domain was then assigned to Mashiyama Masamitsu, with its kokudaka raised to 20,000 koku. Mashiyama Masatoshi had been raised to the ranks of the daimyō as his sister, Hojyu-in, was a concubine of Shogun Tokugawa Iemitsu and had given birth to his heir, Tokugawa Ietsuna. His son, Mashiyama Masamitsu had previously successfully served as daimyō of Nishio Domain and Shimodate Domains. The Mashiyama clan continued to rule Nagashima until the Meiji restoration. The 6th daimyō Masuyama Masayasu and the 7th daimyō Masayama Masanao both served as wakadoshiyori in the shogunal administration. During the Bakumatsu period, the domain continued to support the shogunate and sent forces in the Chōshū expedition of 1864; however, after the start of the Boshin War and the defection of surrounding (and more powerful domains) to the imperial side, Nagashima Domain also followed suit. Mashiyama Masanao was ordered to send troops in the Hokuetsu campaign and against the Ōuetsu Reppan Dōmei, but the new Meiji government remained suspicious of his loyalties, and Sekihōtai leader Sagara Sōzō extorted the domain of 3000 ryō. The domain, as with all other domains, was ended with the abolition of the han system in 1871.

== Holdings at the end of the Edo period ==
As with most domains in the han system, Nagashima Domain consisted of several discontinuous territories calculated to provide the assigned kokudaka, based on periodic cadastral surveys and projected agricultural yields.

- Ise Province
  - 57 villages in Kuwana District
- Totomi Province
  - 24 villages in Haibara District

== List of daimyō ==
#	Name	Tenure	Courtesy title	Court Rank	kokudaka
Suganuma clan, 1601-1609 (fudai)
1	Suganuma Sadayori (菅沼定仍)	1601–1605	Shima-no-kami (志摩守)	Junior 5th Rank, Lower Grade (従五位下)	20,000 koku
2	Suganuma Sadayoshi (菅沼定芳)	1605–1621	Oribe-no-sho (織部正)	Junior 5th Rank, Lower Grade (従五位下)	20,000 koku
tenryō 1631–1649
Hisamatsu-Matsudaira clan, 1649-1702 (fudai)
1	Matsudaira Yasnao (松平康尚)	1649–1685	Sado-no-kami (佐渡守)	Junior 5th Rank, Lower Grade (従五位下)	10,000 koku
2	Matsudaira Tadamitsu (松平忠充)	1685–1702	Sado-no-kami (佐渡守)	Junior 5th Rank, Lower Grade (従五位下)	10,000 koku
Mashiyama clan, 1702-1871 (fudai)
1	Mashiyama Masamitsu (増山正弥)	1702–1705	Hyobu-shoyu (兵部少輔)	Junior 5th Rank, Lower Grade (従五位下)	20,000 koku
2	Mashiyama Masato (増山正任)	1705–1741	Kawachi-no-kami (河内守)	Junior 5th Rank, Lower Grade (従五位下)	20,000 koku
3	Mashiyama Masatake (増山正武)	1742–1747	Danjo-shosuke (弾正少弼)	Junior 5th Rank, Lower Grade (従五位下)	20,000 koku
4	Mashiyama Masayoshi (増山正贇)	1747–1776	Tsushima-no-kami (対馬守)	Junior 5th Rank, Lower Grade (従五位下)	20,000 koku
5	Mashiyama Masakata (増山正賢)	1776–1801	Kawachi-no-kami (河内守)	Junior 5th Rank, Lower Grade (従五位下)	20,000 koku
6	Mashiyama Masayasu (増山正寧)	1801–1842	Danjo-shosuke (弾正少輔)	Junior 5th Rank, Lower Grade (従五位下)	20,000 koku
6	Mashiyama Masanao (増山正修)	1842–1869	Tsushima-no-kami (対馬守)	Junior 5th Rank, Lower Grade (従五位下)	20,000 koku
7	Mashiyama Masatomo (増山正同)	1869–1871	Bitchu-no-kami (中守)	5th Rank (従五位)	20,000 koku

== See also ==
- List of Han
- Abolition of the han system
