= Matsudaira Nobuyori =

Japanese daimyō

Matsudaira Nobuyori (松平 信順, July 14, 1793 – April 19, 1844) was a Japanese daimyō of the Edo period, who ruled the Yoshida Domain. He held several positions in the Tokugawa shogunate, including that of Kyoto Shoshidai.

Preceded by Ōta Sukemoto	44th Kyoto Shoshidai; 1834–1837	Succeeded by Doi Toshitsura
