= Nagashima Castle =

Japanese castle

- 長島城
- Kuwana, Mie Prefecture, Japan
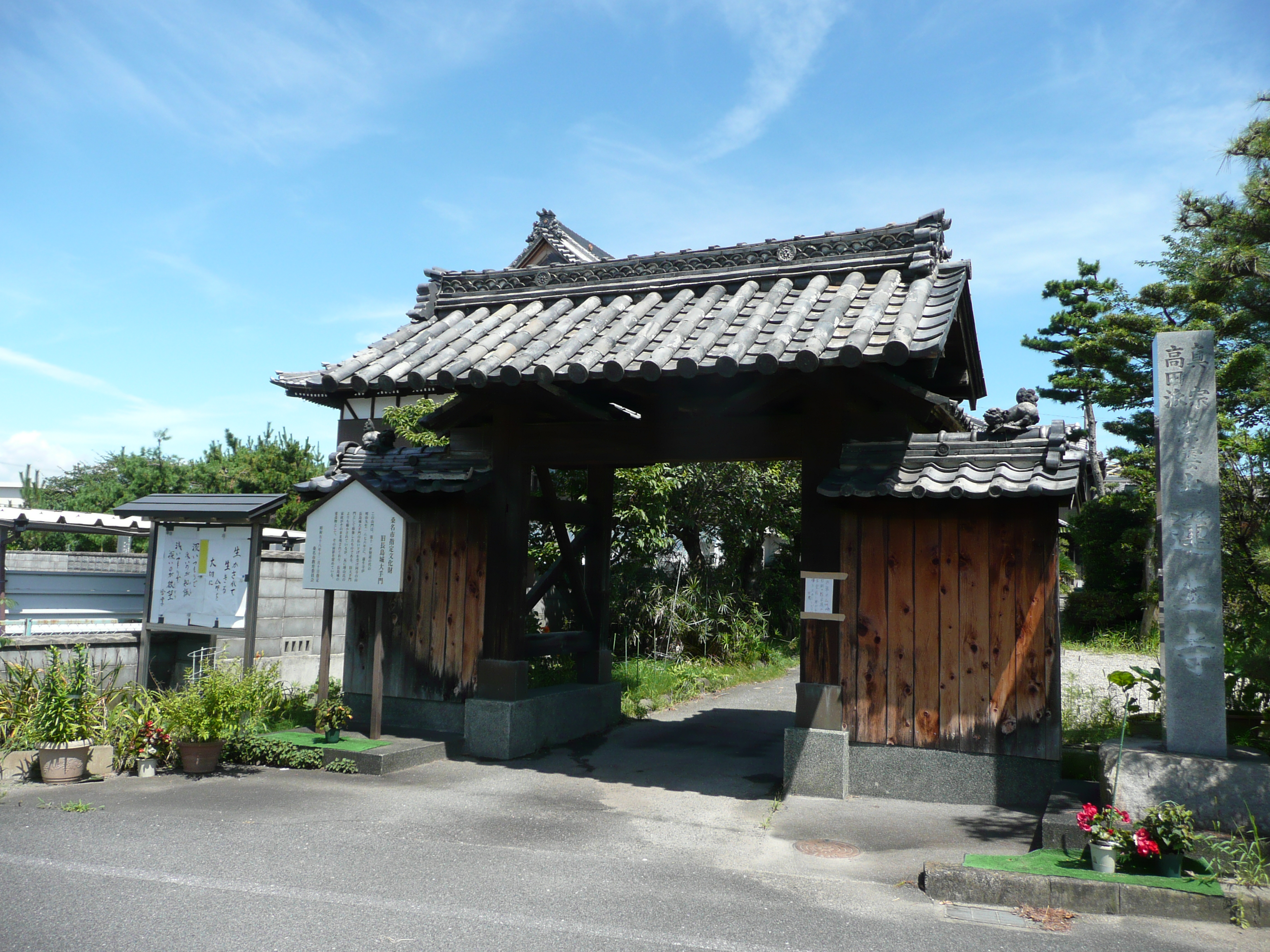
- Ōtemon gate of Nagashima Castle

Site information
- Type: hirashiro-style Japanese castle
- Open to the public: yes
- Condition: ruins

Location
- Coordinates: 35°5′34.5″N 136°41′52.1″E

Site history
- Built: 1245; rebuilt 1601
- Built by: Kujō Michiie
- In use: Edo period
- Demolished: 1872

Nagashima Castle (長島城, Nagashima-jō), is a hirashiro-style Japanese castle located in northern part of the city of Kuwana, Mie Prefecture, Japan. It was the administrative center of Nagashima Domain during the Edo period.

== History ==
Nagashima is an alluvial island between the Nagara River and the Kiso River at the head of Ise Bay. A fortification was first built here by the Regent Kujō Michiie in 1245 to protect the extensive estates he had in this region. In 1482, the castle was rebuilt by Ito Shigeharu, head of one of the 48 samurai clans of northern Ise. However, the Ito clan was expelled by Shōi the chief priest of Gansho-ji and became a stronghold of the Ikkō-ikki movement. It was later infamous as the location of a massacre of 20,000 Ikkō followers by the forces of Oda Nobunaga in 1574. The castle was later rebuilt by Takigawa Kazumasu and after the Battle of Shizugatake was assigned to Oda Nobukatsu. After a large earthquake in 1586 which caused the collapse of its tenshu, Oda Nobukatsu relocated his seat to Kiyosu Castle. Following the Battle of Sekigahara and the creation of Nagashima Domain under the Tokugawa Shogunate, Nagashima Castle was rebuilt by the Suganuma clan as the administrative center of their 20,000 koku domain, and a castle town was laid out to surround it. In 1702, Masuyama Masamitsu, the cousin of Shogun Tokugawa Ietsuna was relocated to Nagashima from Shimodate Domain in Hitachi Province, and the Masuyama clan continued to rule from Nagashima stole until the Meiji restoration. During this period the castle was renovated and expanded, but no tenshu was ever erected. In 1872, in line with edicts by the new Meiji government, the remaining structures of the castle were dismantled.

Currently, the site of the castle is occupied by the Nagashima Chubu Elementary School and Nagashima Junior High School, and most of the remains have been lost. Some stone walls and moats remain on the east side. A few of the castle structures have survived in other locations. The former Ōtemon gate of the castle is now located at the temple of Rensei-ji and the Okushoin has been relocated to the temple of Fukagyo-ji (both located within Nagashima-cho). The Otemon Gate is a Registered Tangible Cultural Property of Kuwana City. In addition, a large Japanese black pine tree estimated to be more than 300 years old, survives in what was once the southwest corner of the main enclosure (within the grounds of the Nagashima Chubu Elementary School). It is protected asa Natural Monument of Kuwana City.

The castle is a ten-minute walk from Kintetsu Nagashima Station or Nagashima Station on the JR East Kansai Main Line.

== See also ==
- Nagashima Domain

== Literature ==
- Schmorleitz, Morton S. (1974). Castles in Japan. Tokyo: Charles E. Tuttle Co. pp. 144–145. ISBN 0-8048-1102-4.
- Motoo, Hinago (1986). Japanese Castles. Tokyo: Kodansha. p. 200 pages. ISBN 0-87011-766-1.
- Mitchelhill, Jennifer (2004). Castles of the Samurai: Power and Beauty. Tokyo: Kodansha. p. 112 pages. ISBN 4-7700-2954-3.
- Turnbull, Stephen (2003). Japanese Castles 1540-1640. Osprey Publishing. p. 64 pages. ISBN 1-84176-429-9.
