= Okaji no Kata =

Concubine of Tokugawa Ieyasu

- お梶の方

Personal life
- Born: December 7, 1578
- Died: September 17, 1642

Religious life
- Religion: Buddhism
- Founder of: Eishō-ji Temple
- Dharma name: Eishō-in (英勝院)
- Consecration: Eishō-ji
- Military career
- Allegiance: Tokugawa clan
- Unit: Ōta clan

Okaji no Kata (お梶の方) (December 7, 1578 – September 17, 1642) or Lady Okaji, was a Japanese noble lady and aristocrat who lived during the Sengoku period and at the beginning of Edo period. She was the founder of Eishō-ji temple in Kamakura and was also a concubine of Tokugawa Ieyasu. She was maybe from the Ōta clan. Her other names are Ohachi no Kata (お八の方) and Okatsu no Kata (お勝の方).

== Biography ==
Okaji no kata was of relatively unknown origin. She was either Ōta Yasusuke's adopted daughter, Tōyama Naokage's daughter, or Edo Shigemichi's daughter. There are also tales that say she shared a brother-sister relationship with Dōkan. Various theories state that she could have been Tōyama Tsunakage's daughter or youngest sister.

Many people believe that Ieyasu met Okaji around the time he first settled in Edo. Due to her status as his concubine, her age when they met is not recorded but some historians postulate that she could have been in her early teens. The two met due to her older brother reaching a higher status.

She was admired by Tenkai, a Buddhist monk and political advisor from Ieyasu. He then recognized Okatsu's intelligence and recommended her to Ieyasu. Ieyasu was pleased with her charming wit and fell in love with her quickly. She was going to marry Matsudaira Masatsuna (Ieyasu's son) but the arrangement was cancelled after she became pregnant.

Okaji's life is based on several tales and theories. It is said that she was loved by Ieyasu and his retainers. There is a story that says that Ieyasu spontaneously asked his subjects what was the most delicious food. While everyone present gave their own answers, Ieyasu turned to Okaji and asked for her answer. She quaintly said salt and, when pressed for why she chose it, responded, "It seasons the taste to any meal." Ieyasu then asked what was the worst tasting food and she gave the same answer. Her explanation was "Because too much salt can simply ruin a meal." Her answers pleased her audience and lightened the mood of their gathering.

In 1607, Okaji gave birth to Ieyasu's last son - she is the sixth daughter - when she was thirty. Her daughter Ichihime was promptly engaged to Date Masamune's heir, Toragikumaru, but died aged four after she ate some wild berries that poisoned her. Because of this incident, Ieyasu ordered that 8 years old Tsuruchiyomaru (鶴千代丸) who was Kageyama-dono (Oman no Kata)'s child being adopted by Okaji. Ieyasu sent one of his grandchildren, Toramatsu, to be adopted into the Date family and asked that Furihime (daughter of Ikeda Terumasa and Tokuhime) be his adoptive mother.

Okaji was in low status, if she was killed or captured, it would not cause much turmoil in the Tokugawa clan, however, it is said that she served as an inspiration for Ieyasu. She accompanied Ieyasu at the Battle of Sekigahara and the Siege of Osaka, dressed as a man she fought alongside other warriors. She was held hostage at Osaka castle, but escaped and returned to Ieyasu on horseback.

After Ieyasu's death in 1616, Okaji became a nun with the Buddhist name Eishō-in (英勝院). She was the founder of Eishō-ji temple in Kamakura, who was the Ōta Dōkan's residence. It is speculated that she was a proud supporter of Lady Kasuga, the wet nurse and political advisor of Tokugawa Iemitsu. After Ieyasu's death, there were few other noble women remaining in the Tokugawa clan, but there were still children who needed to be raised. Since swearing as a nun, she has gladly accepted Lady Kasuga. She was very courteous to her and quickly accepted her as part of the Tokugawa family.

Okaji no Kata died at the age of 65 years. A few observers state that her ties to the Tokugawa family elongated her family's legacy until the Meiji Restoration took place.
