= Ōta Sukemoto =

Japanese daimyō (1799–1867)

- 太田資始
- Born: August 28, 1799
- Died: June 20, 1867 (aged 67); Edo, Japan
- Occupations: Daimyō; Rōjū

Ōta Sukemoto (太田 資始; August 28, 1799 – June 20, 1867) was the 5th daimyō of Kakegawa Domain in Tōtōmi Province, (modern-day Shizuoka Prefecture) in late-Edo period and Bakumatsu period Japan and a high-level office holder within the Tokugawa shogunate, and ninth hereditary chieftain of the Kakegawa-Ōta clan. His courtesy title was Dewa-no-kami.

== Biography ==
Ōta Sukemoto was the third son of Hotta Masazane, daimyō of Omi-Miyagawa Domain. He was selected as posthumous heir on Ōta Suketoki's sudden death in 1810 and married to one of Suketoki's daughters. At the time, he was only eleven years old. He was received in formal audience by Shōgun Tokugawa Ienari in 1812 and was appointed a sōshaban in 1818.

Sukemoto was appointed Jisha-bugyō on July 17, 1822, and Osaka-jō dai on November 22, 1828, followed by the post of Kyoto Shoshidai from July 4, 1831, through May 19, 1834.

On May 6, 1837, he became a rōjū, in which position he often clashed with senior rōjū Mizuno Tadakuni over the provisions of the unpopular Tenpō Reforms, especially the Agechi-rei which was to have daimyō in the vicinity of Edo and Ōsaka surrender their holdings for equal amounts of land elsewhere, thereby consolidating Tokugawa control over these strategically vital areas. After Mizuno was deposed from office, Sukemoto promoted the interests of Tokugawa Nariaki. However, one of Nariaki's first actions was to replace Sukemoto, who was asked to retire on July 20, 1841.

On his forced retirement, Sukemoto turned Kakegawa domain over to his eldest son Ōta Sukekatsu. However upon Ienari's death, he returned to serve as rōjū again from June 23, 1858, through July 23, 1859, together with Matsudaira Noriyasu and Manabe Akikatsu. He returned again for a brief third term from April 27 – May 14, 1863.

Suekmoto later remarried to a daughter of Uesugi Narisada of Yonezawa Domain. He died on June 20, 1867, and his grave is at the Ōta clan bodaiji of Myōhokke-ji in Mishima, Shizuoka.

== Notes ==
Preceded by Ōta Suketoki	Daimyō of Kakegawa; 1810–1841	Succeeded by Ōta Sukekatsu
Preceded by Matsudaira Muneakira	56th Castellan of Osaka; 1829–1831	Succeeded by Matsudaira Nobuyori
Preceded by Matsudaira Muneakira	43rd Kyoto Shoshidai; 1832–1834	Succeeded by Matsudaira Nobuyori
