= Eishō-ji =

Buddhist temple in Kamakura, Kanagawa, Japan

Coordinates: 35°19′30.5″N 139°32′59.5″E

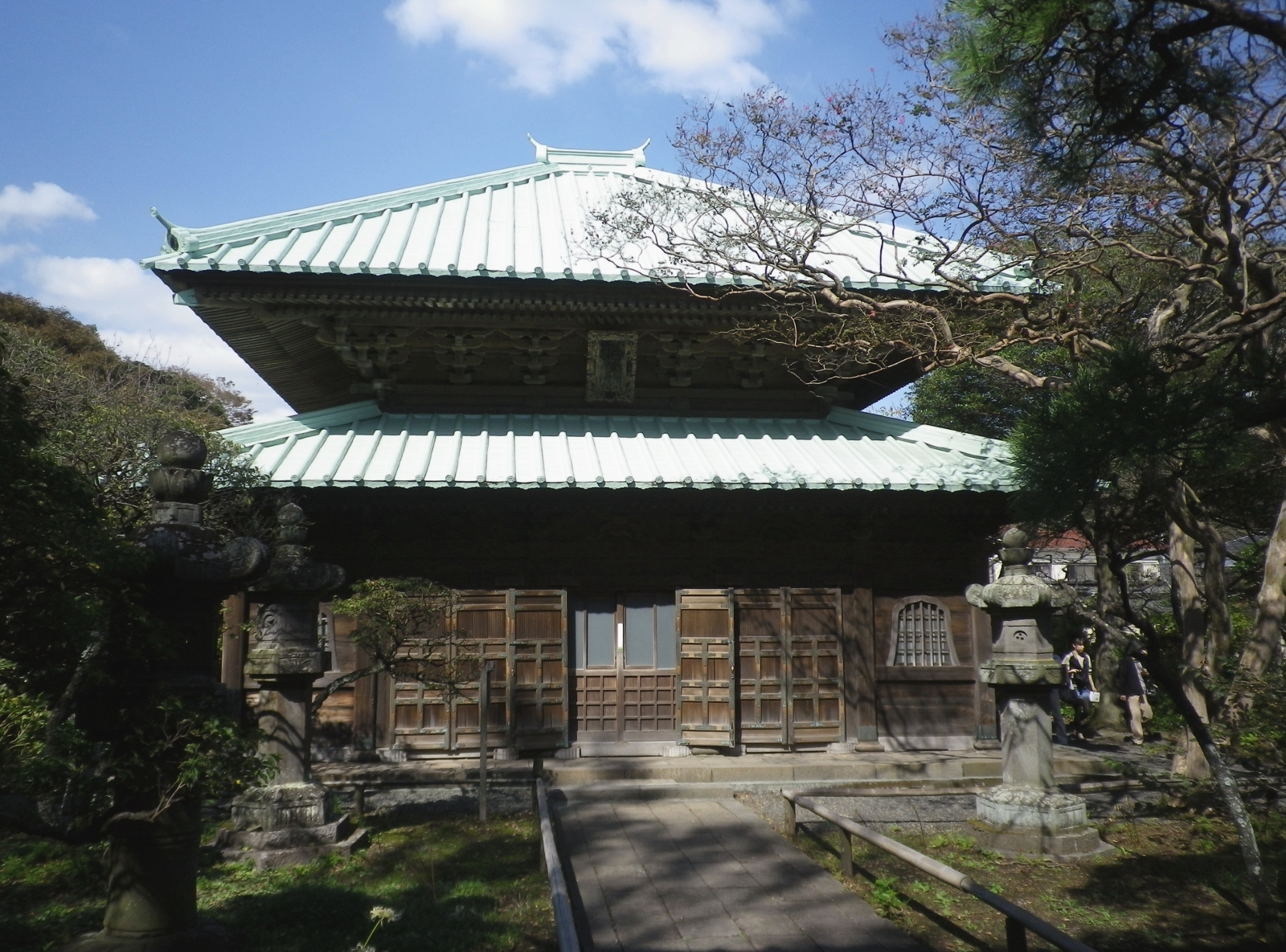
- Eishō-ji Honden

Religion
- Affiliation: Jōdo-shū

Location
- Location: 1-16-3, Ogigayatsu, Kamakura-shi, Kanagawa-ken
- Country: Japan
- Interactive map of Eishō-ji

Architecture
- Founder: Okaji no Kata (Eishōinni)
- Completed: 1636

Eisho-ji (英勝寺) is a Jōdo-shū temple in Ogigayatsu, Kamakura, Kanagawa, Japan, and is the sole nunnery in Kamakura. The mountain name is Tokozan.

Okaji no Kata, a concubine of Tokugawa Ieyasu, took the name Eishoin after her pabbajja and founded the temple. The temple is thought to be located at the site of the residence of Ōta Dōkan, who was ancestor of the architect of Edo castle. Okaji no Kata bore Ieyasu a daughter, Ichihime, but she died very young. After Ichihime's death, Ieyasu ordered Okaji no Kata to become the adoptive mother of Tokugawa Yorifusa, who later reigned over Mito Domain. The founding priestess Gyokuhōseiinni was a daughter of Yorifusa. From its foundation, princesses of Mito Domain regularly became priestesses of Eisho-ji. Thus people called the temple "Mito palace" or "Nunnery of Mito".

After the Meiji Restoration, the practice of obtaining priestesses from the Mito Domain was discontinued and influence of the temple waned. During the 1923 Great Kantō earthquake, the temple gate was damaged but volunteers eventually rebuilt it on the original cornerstone, with the completion ceremony being held on May 16, 2011. The temple is the 6th temple of Togoku Hananotera 100 kaji located in Kamakura.
