= Kakegawa Domain =

17th-19th century feudal domain in Kakegawa, Shizuoka, Japan

Kakegawa Domain 掛川藩
- under Tokugawa shogunate Japan
- 1601–1868
- Capital: Kakegawa Castle
- Area
  - Coordinates: 34°46′32″N 138°00′53″E
  - Type: Daimyō
- Historical era: Edo period
  - Established: 1601
  - Disestablished: 1868
- Today part of: part of Shizuoka Prefecture

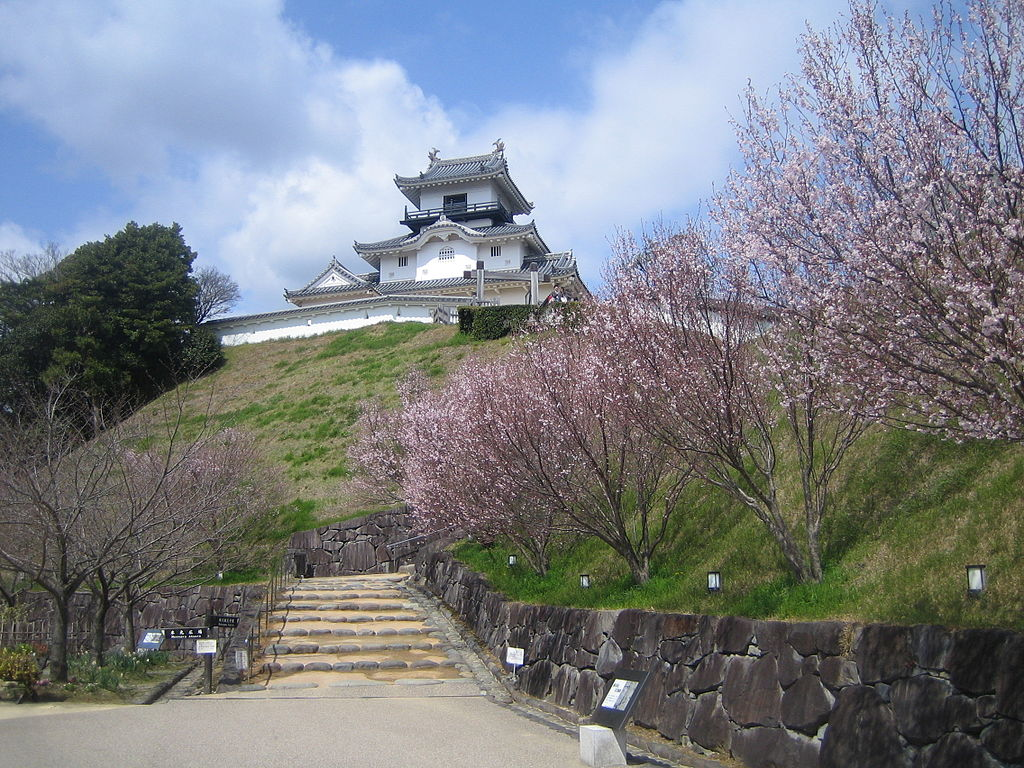
Kakegawa Castle

Kakegawa Domain (掛川藩, Kakegawa-han) was a feudal domain under the Tokugawa shogunate of Edo period Japan. The domain was centered at Kakegawa Castle in Tōtōmi Province, in what is now the city of Kakegawa, Shizuoka.

== History ==
During the Sengoku period, Kakegawa was a fortified settlement of the Imagawa clan. Following the defeat of the Imagawa at the hands of Oda Nobunaga at the Battle of Okehazama, Kakegawa, along with the rest of Tōtōmi Province came under the control of Takeda Shingen. Imagawa loyalist Asahina Yasutomo surrendered Kakegawa to Takeda ally Tokugawa Ieyasu. After the death of Takeda Shingen, Ieyasu took control of all of Tōtōmi Province, and assigned Kakegawa to his retainer Ishikawa Ienari. However, after the Battle of Odawara, Ieyasu was forced to surrender his domains in the Tōkai region to Toyotomi Hideyoshi in exchange for the provinces of the Kantō region. Toyotomi retainer Yamauchi Kazutoyo was assigned Kakegawa, and considerably improved on the structure of the castle and its moat system.

After the Battle of Sekigahara, Tokugawa Ieyasu regained control over the Tōkai region, and Yamauchi Kazutoyo surrendered Kakegawa in exchange for Tosa Province in Shikoku.

In February 1601, Hisamatsu Sadakatsu, Ieyasu's half-brother, was made daimyō of the new Kakegawa Domain with revenues of 10,000 koku. In April 1607, he was reassigned to the newly created Fushimi Domain, and turned Kakegawa over to his son Sadayuki, who ruled until reassigned to Kuwana Domain in 1617.

Andō Naotsugu was daimyō with revenues increased to 28,000 koku from 1617 to 1619, when he was reassigned to Tanabe Domain as advisor to Tokugawa Yorinobu. Rule over Kakegawa was briefly given back to a branch of the Hisamatsu clan with the transfer of Hisamatsu Sadatsuna from Shimotsuma Domain in Shimōsa Province with revenues slightly increased to 30,000 koku. However, he was transferred to Yodo Domain in Yamashiro Province in 1623.

The next inhabitant of Kakegawa Castle was Asakura Nobumasa, a close advisor of the ill-fated Tokugawa Tadanaga. After Tadanaga’s forced suicide, Asakura was stripped of his domain and exiled to Kōriyama in Yamato Province.

Aoyama Yoshinari, formerly of Hitachi Province was then assigned to Kakegawa, and his revenues were set at 33,000 koku. He was reassigned to Amagasaki Domain in 1635, and replaced by Matsudaira Tadashige, formerly daimyō of Tanaka Domain in Suruga Province. Domain revenues were increased to 40,000 koku, and after his death in 1639, he was succeeded by his son Tadamoto, who was then transferred to Iiyama Domain in Shinano Province only a month later. Honda Tadayoshi, grandson of Honda Tadakatsu was assigned to Kakegawa next, and revenues were increased to 70,000 koku. However, in 1644, Honda Tadayoshi was reassigned to Murakami Domain in Echigo Province.

Tanaka Domain again provided a successor, in the form of Matsudaira Tadaharu; however, the Bakufu reduced the rating of Kakegawa Domain back to 25,000 koku. In 1648, he was transferred to Kameyama Domain in Tanba Province. Tanaka Domain once more provided a successor: Hōjō Ujishige, who lasted until his death without heir in 1658.

In February the following year, Ii Naoyoshi was brought in from Nishio Domain in neighboring Mikawa Province, and governed Kakegawa until his death in 1672. His branch of the Ii clan continued to rule Kakegawa until 1706.

After a brief period under Matsudaira (Sakurai) Tadataka until his transfer to Amagasaki Domain, Kakegawa came under control of the generation of the Ogasawara clan from 1711 until their transfer to Tanakura Domain in 1746.

Finally, in 1746, Ōta Suketoshi was assigned to Kakegawa from Tatebayashi Domain in Kōzuke Province. The Ōta provided the next seven daimyōs of Kakegawa until the Meiji Restoration, and thus brought about a period of much-needed stability and continuity to government policies.

The domain had a population of 3,443 people in 906 households per the 1843 census, the domain maintained its primary residence (kamiyashiki) in Edo at Soto-Sakura, in what is now Kasumigaseki, Tokyo.

In February 1869, 7th (and final) daimyō, Ōta Sukeyoshi were transferred by the new Meiji government to the short-lived Matsuo Domain in Kazusa Province. The holdings of Kakegawa Domain in Suruga and Tōtōmi were absorbed into the new Shizuoka Domain created for retired ex-shōgun Tokugawa Yoshinobu; its holdings in Izu Province were absorbed into Niirayama Prefecture.

== Holdings at the end of the Edo period ==
As with most domains in the han system, Kakegawa Domain consisted of several discontinuous territories calculated to provide the assigned kokudaka, based on periodic cadastral surveys and projected agricultural yields.

- Tōtōmi Province
  - 33 villages in Haibara District
  - 5 villages in Kitō District
  - 76 villages in Saya District
  - 19 villages in Shūchi District
  - 15 villages in Yamana District
  - 18 villages in Toyoda District
- Suruga Province
  - 11 villages in Shida District
- Izu Province
  - 8 villages in Naka District
  - 21 villages in Kamo District

== List of daimyō ==
#	Name	Tenure	Courtesy title	Court Rank	kokudaka
Hisamitsu clan, 1601–1616 (fudai)
1	Hisamitsu Sadakatsu (松平定勝)	1601–1607	Oki-no-kami (隠岐守)	Junior 5th Rank, Lower Grade (従五位下)	10,000 koku
2	Hisamitsu Sadayuki (松平定行)	1607–1624	Kawachi-no-kami (河内守)	Junior 5th Rank, Lower Grade (従五位下)	10,000 koku
Andō clan, 1616–1619 (fudai)
1	Andō Naotsugu (安藤直次)	1617–1619	Ōsumi-no-kami (大隅守)	Junior 5th Rank, Lower Grade (従五位下)	28,000 koku
Hisamitsu clan, 1619–1625 (fudai)
1	Hisamitsu Sadatsuna (松平定綱)	1616–1618	Etchū-no-kami (越中守)	Junior 5th Rank, Lower Grade (従五位下)	30,000 koku
Asakura clan, 1625–1632 (fudai)
1	Asakura Nobumasa (朝倉宣正)	1624–1631	Echizen-no-kami(越前守)	Junior 5th Rank, Lower Grade (従五位下)	40,000 koku
Aoyama clan, 1633–1639 (fudai)
1	Aoyama Yukinari (青山幸成)	1633–1635	Ōkura-no-shō (大蔵少輔)	Junior 5th Rank, Lower Grade (従五位下)	25,000→35,000 koku
Matsudaira (Sakurai) clan, 1635–1639 (fudai)
1	Matsudaira Tadashige (松平忠重)	1635–1639	Daizen-no-suke (大膳亮)	Junior 5th Rank, Lower Grade (従五位下)	25,000→35,000 koku
2	Matsudaira Tadatomo (松平忠倶)	1639	Tōtōmi-no-kami (遠江守)	Junior 5th Rank, Lower Grade (従五位下)	40,000 koku
Honda clan, 1639–1644 (fudai)
1	Honda Tadayoshi (本多忠義)	1639–1644	Noto-no-kami (能登守)	Junior 5th Rank, Lower Grade (従五位下)	70,000 koku
Matsudaira (Fujii) clan, 1644–1648 (fudai)
1	Matsudaira Tadaharu (松平忠晴)	1644–1648	Iga-no-kami (伊賀守)	Junior 5th Rank, Lower Grade (従五位下)	25,000 koku
Hōjō clan, 1648–1659 (tozama)
1	Hōjō Ujishige (北条氏重)	1648–1658	Dewa-no-kami (出羽守)	Junior 5th Rank, Lower Grade (従五位下)	30,000 koku
Ii clan, 1659–1706 (fudai)
1	Ii Naoyoshi (井伊直好)	1659–1672	Hyōbu-no-shō (兵部少輔)	Junior 5th Rank, Lower Grade (従五位下)	35,000 koku
2	Ii Naotake (井伊直武)	1672–1694	Hoki-no-kami (伯耆守)	Junior 5th Rank, Lower Grade (従五位下)	35,000 koku
3	Ii Naotomo (井伊直朝)	1694–1705	Hyōbu-no-shō (兵部少輔)	Junior 5th Rank, Lower Grade (従五位下)	35,000 koku
4	Ii Naomori (井伊直矩)	1705–1706	Hyōbu-no-shō (兵部少輔)	Junior 5th Rank, Lower Grade (従五位下)	35,000 koku
Matsudaira (Sakurai) clan, 1706–1713 (fudai)
1	Matsudaira Tadataka (松平忠喬)	1706–1711	Tōtōmi-no-kami (遠江守)	Junior 5th Rank, Lower Grade (従五位下)	40,000 koku
Ogasawara clan, 1713–1746 (fudai)
1	Ogasawara Nagahiro (小笠原長煕)	1711–1734	Yamashiro-no-kami (山城守)	Junior 5th Rank, Lower Grade (従五位下)	60,000 koku
2	Ogasawara Nagatsune (小笠原長庸)	1739–1744	Yamashiro-no-kami (山城守)	Junior 5th Rank, Lower Grade (従五位下)	60,000 koku
3	Ogasawara Nagayuki (小笠原長恭)	1744–1746	Sado-no-kami (佐渡守)	Junior 5th Rank, Lower Grade (従五位下)	60,000 koku
Ōta clan, 1746–1868 (fudai)
1	Ōta Suketoshi (太田資俊)	1746–1763	Settsu-no-kami (摂津守)	Junior 5th Rank, Lower Grade (従五位下)	50,000 koku
2	Ōta Sukeyoshi (太田資愛)	1763–1805	Bitchū-no-kami (備中守), Jijū (侍従)	Junior 4th Rank, Lower Grade (従四位下)	50,000 koku
3	Ōta Sukenobu (太田資順)	1805–1808	Settsu-no-kami (摂津守)	Junior 5th Rank, Lower Grade (従五位下)	50,000 koku
4	Ōta Suketoki (太田資言)	1808–1810	Bingo-no-kami (備後守)	Junior 5th Rank, Lower Grade (従五位下)	50,000 koku
5	Ōta Sukemoto (太田資始)	1810–1841	Bingo-no-kami (備後守); Jijū (侍従)	Junior 4th Rank, Lower Grade (従四位下)	50,000 koku
6	Ōta Sukekatsu (太田資功)	1841–1862	Settsu-no-kami (摂津守)	Junior 5th Rank, Lower Grade (従五位下)	50,000 koku
7	Ōta Sukeyoshi (太田資美)	1862–1868	Bitchū-no-kami (備中守)	Junior 5th Rank, Lower Grade (従五位下)	50,000 koku

== See also ==
- List of Han
