= Shimodate Domain =

Japanese historical estate

Shimodate Domain 下館藩
- under Tokugawa shogunate Japan
- 1598–1871
- Capital: Shimodate Castle
  - Type: Daimyō
- Historical era: Edo period
  - Established: 1598
  - Disestablished: 1871
- Today part of: part of Ibaraki Prefecture

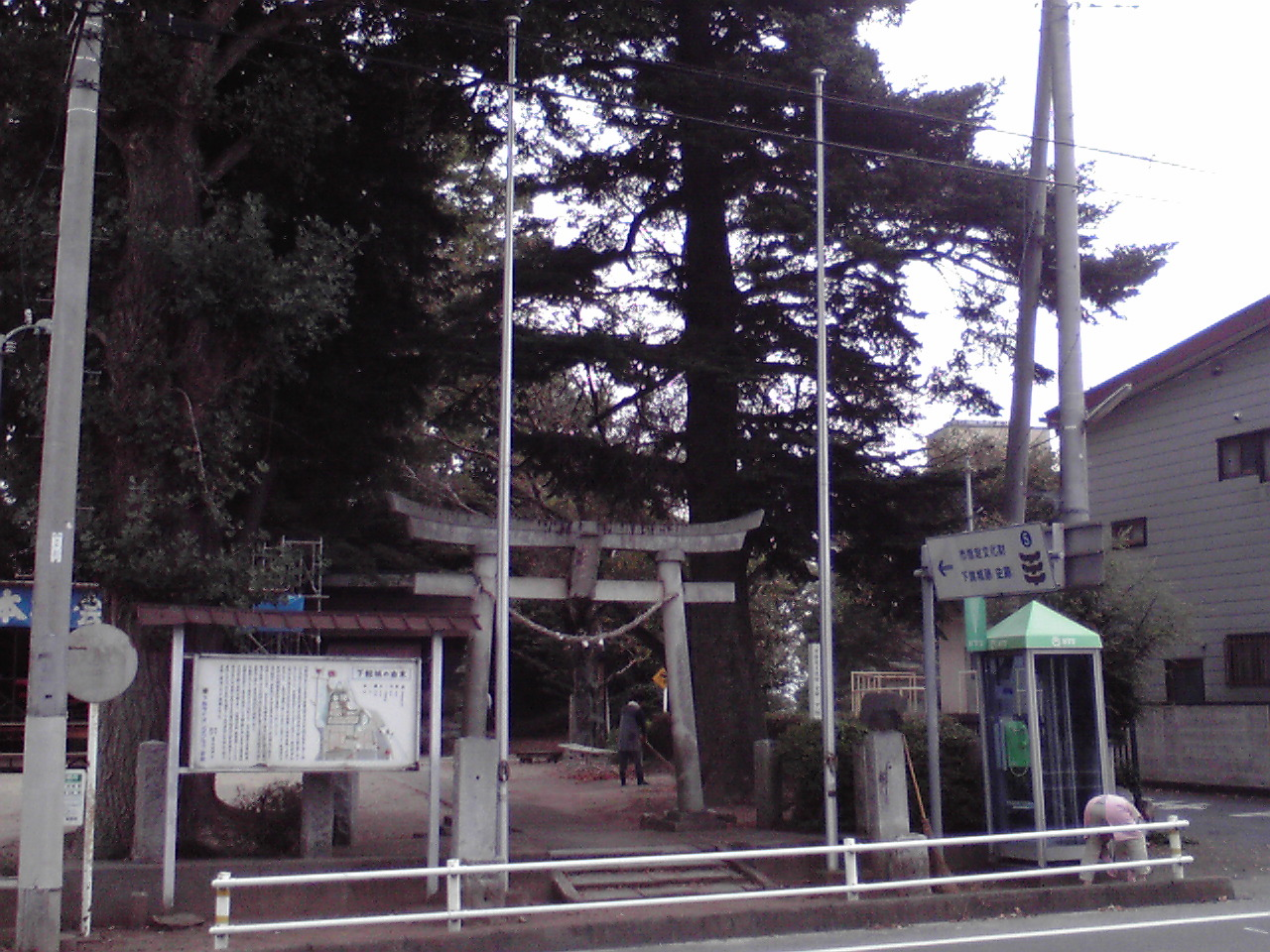
Entrance to Shimodate Castle, administrative center of Shimodate Domain

Shimodate Domain (下館藩, Shimodate-han) was a feudal domain under the Tokugawa shogunate of Edo period Japan, located in Hitachi Province (modern-day Ibaraki Prefecture), Japan. It was centered on Shimodate Castle in what is now the city of Chikusei, Ibaraki. It was ruled for much of its history by a junior branch of the Ishikawa clan.

== History ==
During the Sengoku period, the area around Shimodate was controlled by the Yūki clan, through one of the closest retainers, the Mizunoya clan. The Mizunoya later became independent under Toyotomi Hideyoshi, and although under strong pressure from Ishida Mitsunari and the western daimyō, pledged allegiance to Tokugawa Ieyasu during the Battle of Sekigahara, and were reconfirmed in their 31,000 koku holdings under the Tokugawa shogunate. Mizutani Katsutaka laid out the foundations of the castle town and built a number of temples before the clan was transferred to Nariwa Domain in Bitchu Province.

The domain was then awarded to the eldest son of Tokugawa Yorifusa of Mito Domain, Matsudaira Yorishige, until his transfer to Takamatsu Domain in Sanuki Province in 1642.

The domain became tenryō territory controlled directly by the shogunate until 1663, when it was revived for Mashiyama Masamitsu, who ruled until his transfer to Nagashima Domain in Ise Province in 1702. He was replaced by Inoue Masamine, who had served as a wakadoshiyori, but he held the post for less than a month before moving to Kasama Domain in Hitachi Province. He was replaced by a junior member of the Kuroda clan, Kuroda Naokuni, who ruled until his transfer to Numata Domain in Kozuke Province in 1732.

In 1732, Ishikawa Fusashige was transferred from Kambe Domain in Ise Province. The Ishikawa clan ruled Shimodate for the next 130 years until the Meiji restoration. Until Ishikawa rule, the domain became known for its production of cotton. However, under the 4th Ishikawa daimyō, Ishikawa Fusatada, the domain suffered greatly from flooding, crop failure and a fire which destroyed most of the castle town. During the subsequent famine, there were peasant uprisings and the domain came close to bankruptcy. The 8th Ishikawa lord, Ishikawa Fusatomi, invited Ninomiya Sontoku to the domain to initiate various reforms. The final daimyō, Ishikawa Fusakane, served as wakadoshiyori and Rikugun bugyo under the Tokugawa shogunate and helped suppress the Tenchu revolt; however, during the Boshin War, he switched sides to the Imperial cause. He was reconfirmed as domain governor until the abolition of the han system in 1871.

The domain had a total population of 12933 people in 2918 households per a census in 1741; however, in a census of 1834, the castle town of Shimodate had a population of only 1637 people in 364 households.

== Holdings at the end of the Edo period ==
As with most domains in the han system, Shimodate Domain consisted of several discontinuous territories calculated to provide the assigned kokudaka, based on periodic cadastral surveys and projected agricultural yields. In the case of the Ishikawa, their holdings were almost evenly divided between Hitachi province, and Kawachi province (in what is now Osaka).

- Hitachi Province
  - 30 villages in Makabe District
- Kawachi Province
  - 25 villages in Ishikawa District
  - 5 villages in Furuichi District

== List of daimyō ==
#	Name	Tenure	Courtesy title	Court Rank	kokudaka
Mizunoya clan (tozama) 1598–1639
1	Mizunoya Katsutoshi (水谷 勝俊)	1598–1606	Ise-no-kami (伊勢守)	Lower 5th (従五位下)	31,000 koku
2	Mizunoya Katsutaka (水谷 勝隆)	1606–1639	Ise-no-kami (伊勢守)	Lower 5th (従五位下)	32,000 koku
Tokugawa clan (Shinpan) 1606–1609
1	Matsudaira Yorishige (松平 頼重)	1639–1642	Ukyō-no-daibu (右京大夫); Jiju (侍従)	Lower 4th (従四位下)	50,000 koku
	tenryō	1609–1615			
Mashiyama clan (fudai) 1663–1702
1	Mashiyama Masamitsu (増山 正弥)	1663–1702	Hyōbu-no-sho (兵部少輔)	Lower 5th (従五位下)	23,000 koku
Inoue clan (fudai) 1702–1702
1	Inoue Masamine (井上 正岑)	1702–1702	Kawachi-no-kami (河内守); Jiju (侍従)	Lower 4th (従四位下)	50,000 koku
	tenryō	1702–1703			
Kuroda clan (fudai) 1703–1732
1	Kuroda Naokuni (黒田 直邦)	1703–1732	Buzen-no-kami (豊前守); Jiju (侍従)	Lower 4th (従四位下)	15,000 ->20,000 koku
Ishikawa clan (fudai) 1732–1871
1	Ishikawa Fusashige (石川 総茂)	1732–1733	Omi-no-kami (近江守)	Lower 4th (従四位下)	20,000 koku
2	Ishikawa Fusaharu (石川 総陽)	1733–1740	Harima-no-kami (播磨守)	Lower 5th (従五位下)	20,000 koku
3	Ishikawa Fusatoki (石川 総候)	1740–1770	Wakasa-no-kami (若狭守)	Lower 5th (従五位下)	20,000 koku
4	Ishikawa Fusatada (石川 総弾)	1770–1795	Wakasa-no-kami (若狭守)	Lower 5th (従五位下)	20,000 koku
5	Ishikawa Fusatsura (石川 総般)	1795–1802	Nakatsuka-no-suke (中務少輔)	Lower 5th (従五位下)	20,000 koku
6	Ishikawa Fusachika (石川 総親)	1802–1808	Omi-no-kami (近江守)	Lower 5th (従五位下)	20,000 koku
7	Ishikawa Fusatsugu (石川 総承)	1808–1836	Nakatsuka-no-suke (中務少輔)	Lower 5th (従五位下)	20,000 koku
8	Ishikawa Fusatomi (石川 総貨)	1836–1849	Omi-no-kami (近江守)	Upper 5th (従五位上)	10,000 koku
9	Ishikawa Fusakane (石川 総管)	1849–1871	Wakasa-no-kami (若狭守)	Lower 5th (従五位下)	20,000 koku
