= Ōta clan =

Ōta 太田
- Family crest (kamon) of main Ōta line
- Home province: Tanba Province
- Parent house: Minamoto clan (Seiwa Genji)
- Titles: daimyō, viscount
- Founder: Minamoto (Ōta) Sukekuni
- Final ruler: Ōta Sukeyoshi
- Founding year: 14th century
- Ruled until: 1871 (Abolition of the han system)

The Ōta clan (太田氏,, Ōta-shi) was samurai kin group which rose to prominence in Sengoku and Edo period Japan. Under the Tokugawa shogunate, the Ōta were hereditary vassals (fudai daimyō) of the Tokugawa clan.

== History ==
The Ōta clan claimed descent from the Seiwa Genji via Minamoto no Hirotsune, a younger son of Minamoto no Yorimasa. A 5th generation descendant of Hirotsune, Minamoto no Sukekuni, established himself in Kuwada District of Tanba Province (present day Kameoka, Kyoto) and adopted the name of the Ōta shōen as his own. During the early Muromachi period, Ōta Sukekiyo, served the Ogigayatsu-branch of the Uesugi clan and was appointed Shugodai of Sagami Province. His descendants resided in various locations in Musashi Province through the Sengoku period, at various times controlling Edo Castle, Kawagoe Castle and Iwatsuki Castle. Various branches of the clan also served the Satomi clan, the Later Hōjō clan and the Satake clan. One branch relocated to Kyushu and served as karō to the Nabeshima clan during the Edo period.

After the formation of the Tokugawa Shogunate, Ōta Sukemune served as a hatamoto to Tokugawa Ieyasu after the fall of the Later Hōjō clan, becoming one of the first wakadoshiyori. His sister also became a concubine of Tokugawa Ieyasu. In 1635 he was elevated to the ranks of daimyō with revenues of 15,600 koku in Yamakawa Domain in Shimotsuke Province. He relocated to Nishio Domain in Mikawa Province with an increase to 35,000 koku, and then to the more prestigious Hamamatsu Domain (35,000 koku) in Tōtōmi Province.

His descendants were relocated several times by shogunate decree, residing successively in 1687 at Tanaka Domain in Suruga Province (50,000 koku), in 1703 at Tanagura Domain in Mutsu Province, and in 1728 at Tatebayashi Domain in Kōzuke Province (50,000 koku). Then, in the period spanning the years 1746 through 1868, this branch of the Ōta clan established itself at Kakegawa Domain (53,000 koku) in Tōtōmi.

The final head of the clan, Ōta Sukeyoshi received the kazoku peerage title of shishaku ("viscount") in the Meiji period.

== Notable clan members ==
- Ōta Sukekuni
- Ōta Dōkan, 1432–1486—builder of Edo Castle (1457)
- Ōta Yasusuke
  - Yasusuke's daughter, Okaji no Kata—founded Eishō-ji in Kamakura (1636)
- Ōta Sukemune, grandson of Yasusuke—wakadoshiyori (1833–1838)
- Ōta Sukeyoshi, 1763-1805—Kyoto shoshidai (1789–1792), rōjū (1793–1801)
- Ōta Sukemoto, 1799-1867—Kyoto shoshidai (1831–1834). Rōjū (1837–1841, 1858–1859, 1863)
