= Ōta Sukeyoshi (I) =

Japanese daimyō

Ōta Sukeyoshi 太田資愛
- Born: 1739
- Died: March 17, 1805 (aged 65–66)
- Occupations: Daimyō of Kakegawa Domain; Rōjū

Ōta Sukeyoshi (太田 資愛; 1739 – March 17, 1805) was the 2nd daimyō of Kakegawa Domain in Tōtōmi Province, (modern-day Shizuoka Prefecture) in mid-Edo period Japan, 6th hereditary chieftain of the Kakegawa-Ōta clan, and a high-level office holder within the Tokugawa shogunate.

== Biography ==
Ōta Sukeyoshi was the second son of Ōta Suketoshi, the daimyō of Kakegawa Domain. Under Shōgun Tokugawa Ieharu, he was appointed as sōshaban in 1768 and Jisha-bugyō in 1755. He rose to the position of Wakadoshiyori from 1781. As daimyō of Kakegawa, he invited the noted Neo-Confucian scholar Matsuzaka Kōdō to reside in his domain. In 1789, Sukeyoshi was appointed Kyoto Shoshidai, the shogunate's official representative to the Court in Kyoto. In 1793, Sukeyoshi rose to the position of rōjū to the infant shōgun Tokugawa Ienari, a position he held until 1801.

Sukeyoshi died on March 17, 1805. His grave is at the Ōta clan bodaiji of Myōhokke-ji in Mishima, Shizuoka.

== Notes ==
Preceded by Ōta Suketoshi	Daimyō of Kakegawa; 1763–1805	Succeeded by Ōta Sukenobu
Preceded by Toda Tadaoki	30th Kyoto Shoshidai; 1789–1792	Succeeded by Hotta Masanari
