= Tōtōmi Province =

Former province of Japan

Map of Japanese provinces (1868) with Totomi Province highlighted

Tōtōmi Province (遠江国, Tōtōmi no Kuni; Japanese pronunciation: [tò̞ó̞.tó̞ò̞.mʲì (nò̞ kɯ̈̀.ɲ̟ì), tó̞ó̞-]) was a province of Japan in the area of Japan that is today western Shizuoka Prefecture. Tōtōmi bordered on Mikawa, Suruga and Shinano Provinces. Its abbreviated form name was Enshū (遠州). The origin of its name is the old name of Lake Hamana.

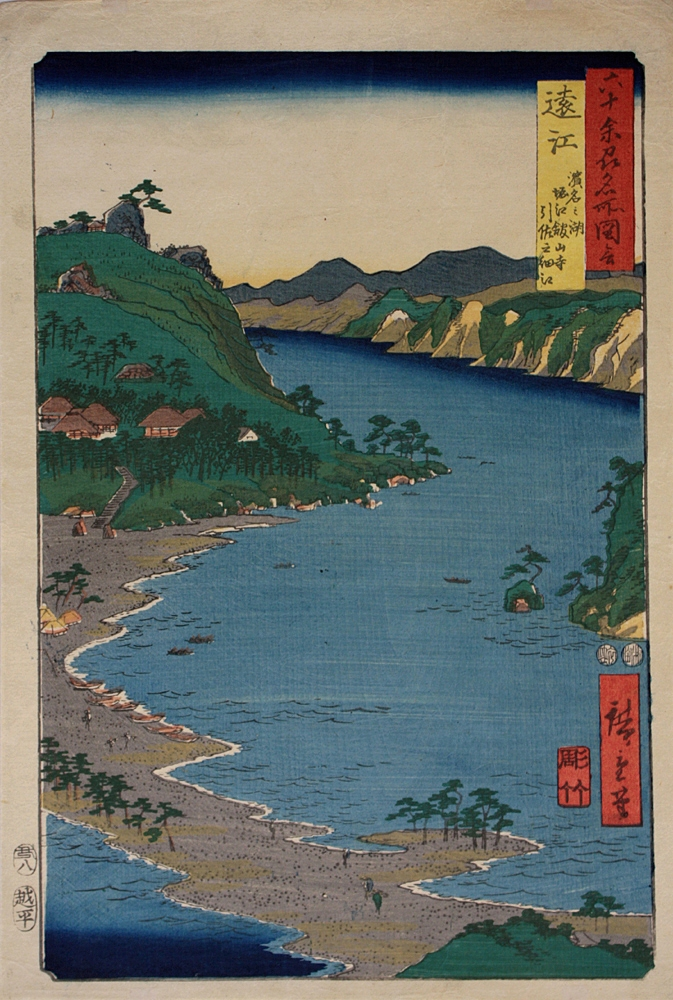
Hiroshige ukiyo-e "Tōtōmi" in "The Famous Scenes of the Sixty States" (六十余州名所図会), depicting Lake Hamana and Kanzan-ji

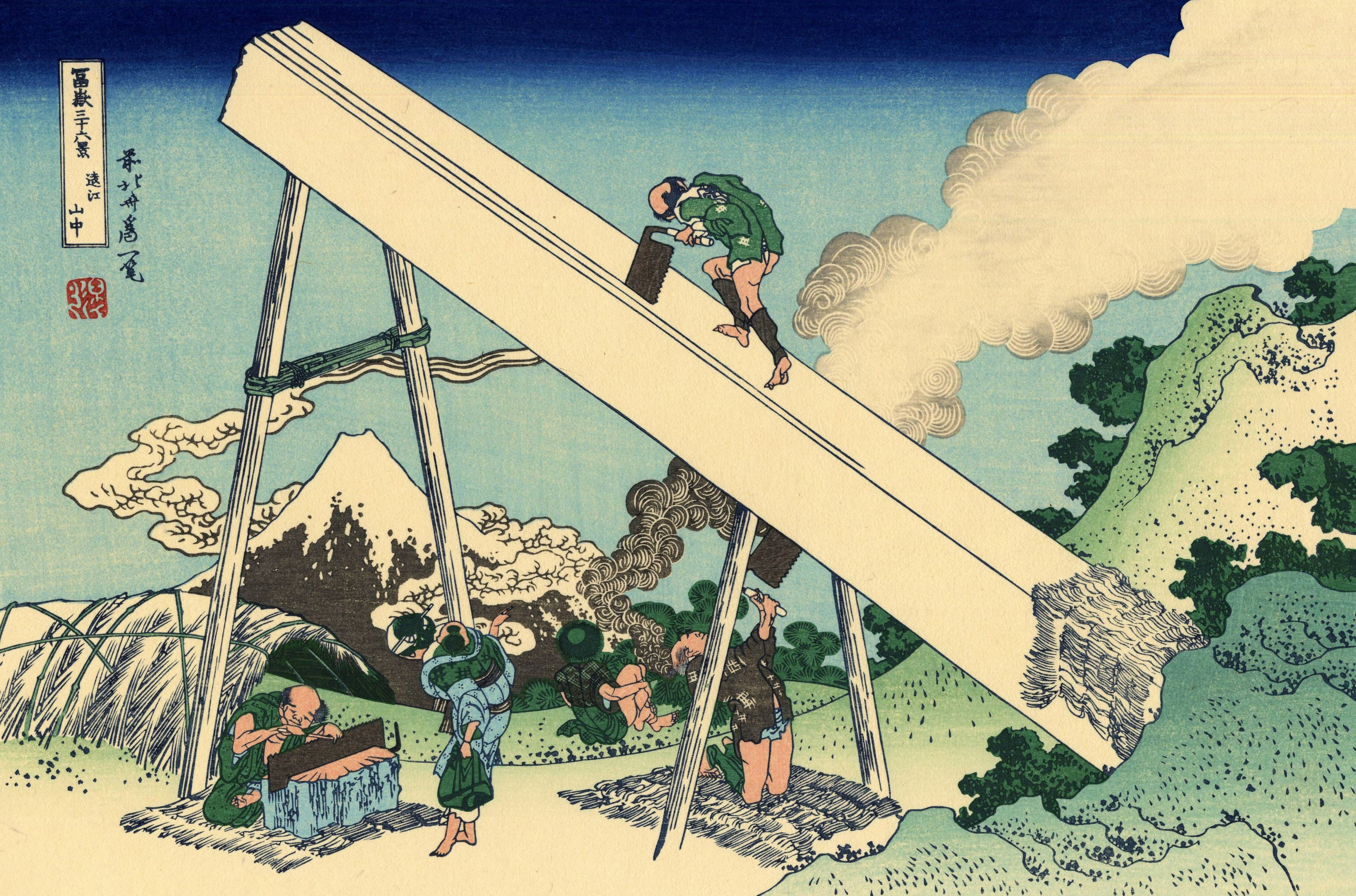
Hokusai

== History ==
Tōtōmi was one of the original provinces of Japan established in the Nara period under the Taihō Code. The original capital of the province was located in what is now Iwata, and was named Mitsuke – a name which survived into modern times as Mitsuke-juku, a post station on the Tōkaidō. Under the Engishiki classification system, Tōtōmi was ranked as a "superior country" (上国) in terms of importance, and one of the 16 "middle countries" (中国) in terms of distance from the capital.

During the early Muromachi period, Tōtōmi was ruled nominally by the Imagawa clan before coming under control of the Shiba clan. However, by the Sengoku period, the Imagawa recovered Tōtōmi and effectively annexed it to Suruga Province. After the defeat of the Imagawa at the Battle of Okehazama, Tōtōmi was divided between the powerful warlords Takeda Shingen of Kai and Tokugawa Ieyasu of Mikawa. To consolidate his new holdings, Tokugawa Ieyasu constructed Hamamatsu Castle, which effectively became the capital of the province, although parts of Tōtōmi continued to be contested between the Tokugawa and Takeda until Shingen's death.

After the Battle of Odawara and the rise to power of Toyotomi Hideyoshi, Tokugawa Ieyasu was forced to trade his domains in the Tōkai region for the Kantō region instead. Hamamatsu was relinquished to the Horii clan and subsidiary Kakegawa Castle to Yamauchi Kazutoyo. After the establishment of the Tokugawa shogunate, the Tokugawa recovered their lost territories, and reassigned Tōtōmi to various fudai daimyōs.

During the Edo period, the Tōkaidō road from Edo to Kyoto passed through Tōtōmi, with post stations at several locations. For defensive purposes, the Tokugawa shogunate forbid the construction of bridges on the major rivers (such as at the Tenryū River), which further led to town development on the major river crossings.

At the end of the Tokugawa shogunate, Tōtōmi Province was divided among several feudal domains, which were assigned to close fudai retainers. Following the defeat of the Tokugawa shogunate during the Boshin War of the Meiji Restoration, the last Tokugawa shōgun, Tokugawa Yoshinobu returned to Suruga in 1868 to rule the short-lived Shizuoka Domain, and the existing daimyōs in Tōtōmi were reassigned to other territories, mostly in Kazusa Province

After the abolition of the han system in 1871 by the new Meiji government, during the first wave of prefectural mergers (第1次府県統合 daiichiji fu/ken tōgō), the new prefectures in Tōtōmi were merged into Hamamatsu Prefecture, with enclaves of other prefectures/exclaves in other provinces being removed, so that Hamamatsu and Tōtōmi became basically contiguous. On August 21, 1876, Hamamatsu was merged into Shizuoka Prefecture, which by that time comprised all of Suruga and Izu provinces, to form an enlarged Shizuoka Prefecture; it reached practically its present-day extent in 1878 when a part of Izu Province, namely the Izu Islands, were transferred from Shizuoka to Tokyo.

Many former samurai of the feudal domains in Tōtōmi, now unemployed due to the sudden end to feudalism, were settled in the Makinohara region, where they developed the green tea industry. With the coming of the Tōkaidō Main Line railway, Hamamatsu developed rapidly into a major commercial and industrial center, especially in connection with the cotton and silk-spinning industries.

== Districts under the Ritsuryō system ==
Tōtōmi Province consisted of twelve districts:

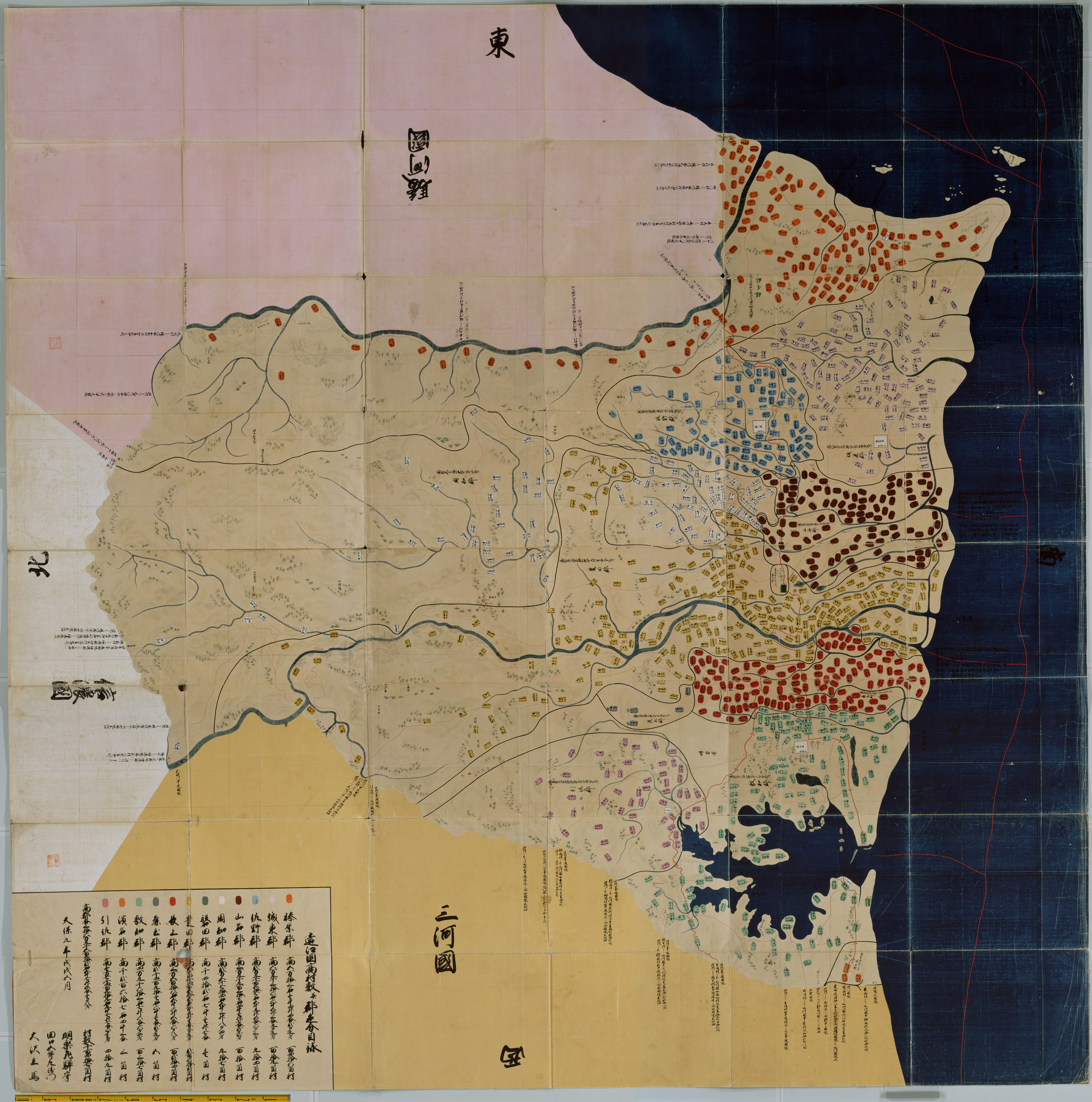
Tenpō 9 (Gregorian 1838–39) provincial map (Tenpō kuniezu) of Tōtōmi from the National Archives Digital Archives, oriented towards the East at the top coloured ovaloids: Villages [and a few towns], given with their nominal rice income (kokudaka) coloured rectangles: towns = mostly castle towns or waystations on major roads, -machi/-chō/-eki/-shuku/-juku etc. village/town colours & black borders: the districts of Tōtōmi, with their total nominal income given in the annotation white rectangles: castles/domain seats, given with their lords red lines: major roads with distance markers (black dots), the thicker line is the Tōkaidō Major mountains/rivers/islands are visually self-explanatory

- In modern times part of: Hamamatsu, Horie (a fiefdom established only in the restoration) and many other feudal domains/shogunate/crown lands/prefectures 1868 → completely Hamamatsu Prefecture 1871/72 → Shizuoka Prefecture since 1876
  - Aratama District (麁玉郡) – merged into Inasa District on April 1, 1896
  - Fuchi District (敷知郡) – merged into Hamana District (along with Nakagami District) on April 1, 1896
  - Haibara District (榛原郡)
  - Hamana District (浜名郡) – absorbed Fuchi and Nakagami Districts on April 1, 1896; now dissolved
  - Inasa District (引佐郡) – absorbed Aratama District on April 1, 1896; now dissolved
  - Iwata District (磐田郡) – absorbed Toyoda and Yamana Districts on April 1, 1896; now dissolved
  - Kitō District (城東郡) – merged with Saya District to become Ogasa District (小笠郡) on April 1, 1896
  - Nagakami District (長上郡) – merged into Hamana District (along with Fuchi District) on April 1, 1896
  - Saya District (佐野郡) – merged with Kitō District to become Ogasa District on April 1, 1896
  - Shūchi District (周智郡)
  - Toyoda District (豊田郡) – merged into Iwata District (along with Yamana District) on April 1, 1896
  - Yamana District (山名郡) – merged into Iwata District (along with Toyoda District) on April 1, 1896

== Bakumatsu-period feudal division ==
Generally, the kokudaka nominal income did not correspond to the actual income from a given village/district/province, and in addition there were some, especially non-agricultural, sources of taxable or direct income that were not always accurately represented in the baku/han kokudaka system of the Edo period.

Note: The kokudaka given in the table is the total from within & without the province, not restricted to the parts of the domain actually located in Tōtōmi.

Bakumatsu-period major holdings in Tōtōmi Province
| Name | type | daimyō | kokudaka | notes |
Shogunate territories & Hatamoto estates (→1868 Imperial territories)
in all twelve districts of Tōtōmi; ignoring spiritual (shrine/temple) holdings, tiny Hamana & Iwata are entirely shogunate domain
Domains seated in Tōtōmi Province
| Hamamatsu Domain | fudai | Inoue | 60,000 koku | |
| Kakegawa Domain | fudai | Ōta | 50,000 koku | |
| Sagara Domain | fudai | Tanuma | 10,000 koku | |
| Yokosuka Domain | fudai | Nishio | 10,000 koku | |
Domains seated elsewhere with holdings in Tōtōmi
| Koromo Domain | | | | holdings in (=income from) Haibara and Shūchi districts |
| Nishio Domain | | | | holdings in Haibara and Kitō |
| Nagashima Domain | | | | holdings in Haibara |
| Sasayama Domain | | | | holdings in Haibara and Kitō |
| Mikawa-Yoshida Domain | | | | holdings in Kitō and Fuchi |
| Shirakawa Domain | | | | holdings in Yamana, Toyoda, Aratama, Inasa |

Note: The following figures are taken from the Japanese Wikipedia article, the database and publication series used as the original source are given in the external links.

Bakumatsu nominal income of Tōtōmi
| District | Villages | approximate kokudaka |
|---|---|---|
| Haibara | 155 | 50,198 |
| Kitō | 149 | 68,905 |
| Saya | 106 | 29,406 |
| Shūchi | 94 | 25,086 |
| Iwata | 1 | 1,041 |
| Yamana | 116 | 39,958 |
| Toyoda | 277 | 55,992 |
| Nagakami | 129 | 30,569 |
| Fuchi | 153 | 49,827 |
| Aratama | 6 | 2,233 |
| Inasa | 54 | 17,927 |
| Hamana | 2 | 1,240 |
| Tōtōmi total | 1,242 | 372,388 |

== Highways ==
- Tōkaidō – connecting Edo with Kyoto
