= Watanabe =

- Language: Japanese

Origin
- Region of origin: Japan

Other names
- Variant forms: Huatanabe, Ouatanabé

Watanabe (渡辺 and other variants (Note: See #Miscellaneous)) is a Japanese surname derived from the noble and samurai Watanabe clan, a branch of the Minamoto clan, descending from the Emperor Saga (786–842), the 52nd Emperor of Japan, and refers to a location called 'Watanabe no tsu' which was settled by the Watanabe clan, who took the name of the place. It was located in the medieval period near the mouth of the Yodogawa River in Settsu Province, in present-day city of Osaka.

The emblem (mon) 'Mitsuboshi ni ichimonji' (three stars over a straight line) of the Watanabe clan

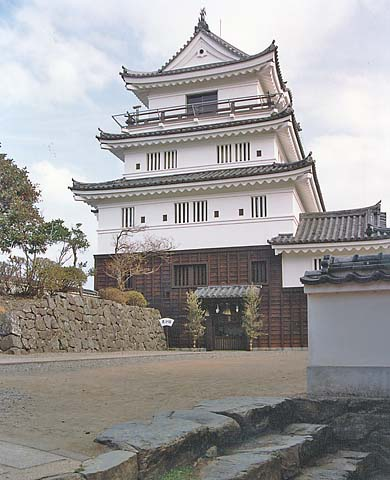
Dungeon of Hirado Castle

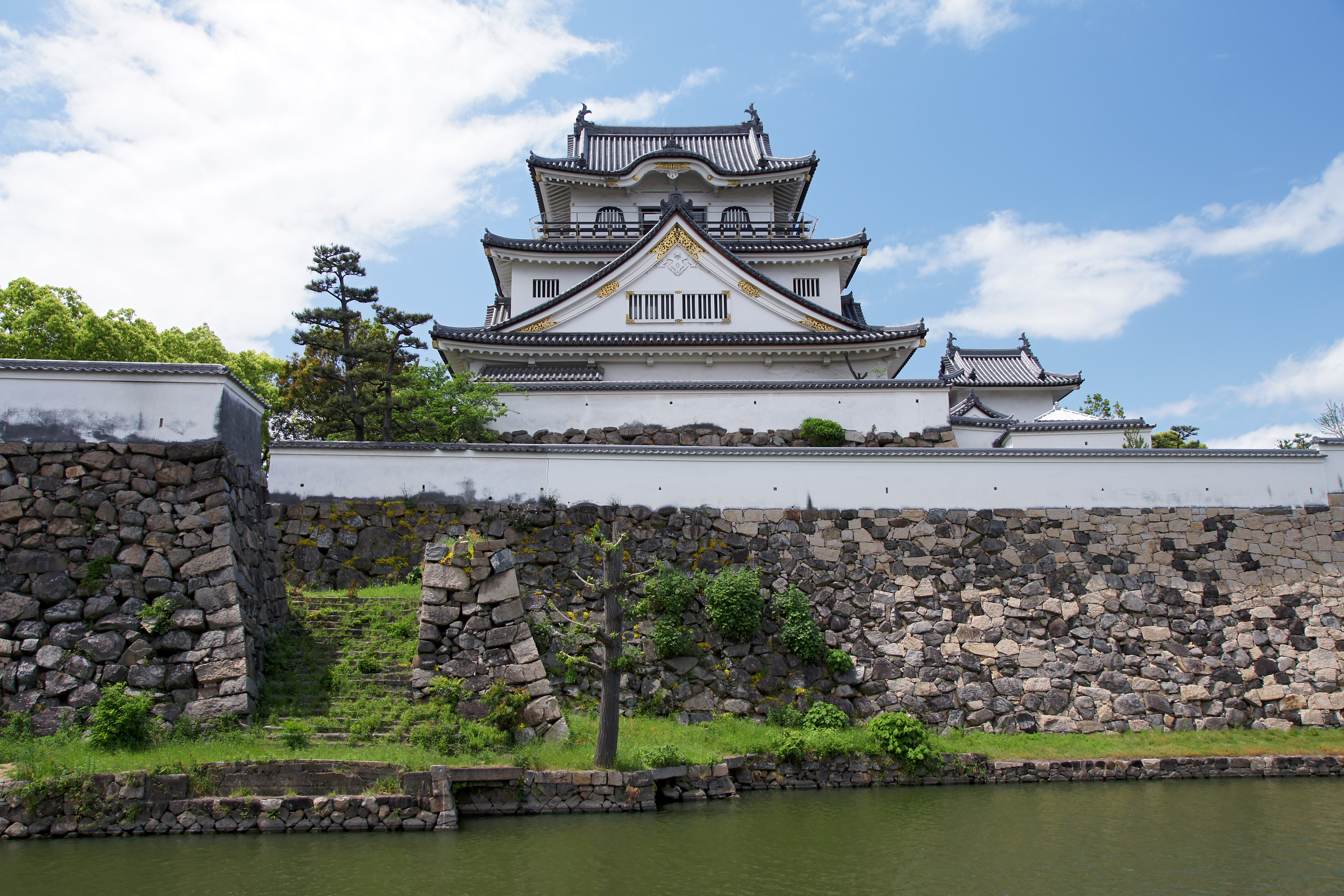
Dungeon of Kishiwada Castle

== History ==
=== Origin ===
The surname Watanabe comes from the Watanabe clan founded by Watanabe no Tsuna (953–1025), of the Saga Genji branch of the Minamoto clan, and his official name was Minamoto no Tsuna. He established the Watanabe branch of the Minamoto clan, taking the name from his stronghold at Watanabe no tsu, a port on the Yodogawa River in Settsu Province, and in 1020 he was appointed Tango no Kami (Governor of Tango Province). He was the son of Minamoto no Atsuru (933–953), married to a daughter of the Chinjufu-shōgun (Commander in chief of the defense of the north) Minamoto no Mitsunaka (912–997); he was the grandson of Minamoto no Tsuko (891–942), Musashi no Kami (Governor of Musashi province); was the great-grandson of Minamoto no Noboru (848–918), Dainagon (Chief Councilor of State); great-great-grandson of Minamoto no Tōru (822–895), Sadaijin (Minister of the Left); and was the great-great-great-grandson of the Emperor Saga (786–842), the 52nd Emperor of Japan. He was the stepgrandson of the Chinjufu-shōgun Minamoto no Mitsunaka, a descendant of the Emperor Seiwa (850–881), and having lost his father the year of his birth, he was adopted by Minamoto no Atsushi, a descendant of the Emperor Ninmyō (808–850), and son in law of Mitsunaka. He was companion in arms to his stepuncle Minamoto no Yorimitsu (944–1021), son of Mitsunaka; and is famous for his military exploits in a number of tales and legends. He is known as one of the Four Guardian Kings (Shitennō) of Yorimitsu, referring to the Buddhist Four Heavenly Kings.

=== Heian period to the Genpei war ===
Watanabe no Den, great-grandson of Tsuna, received from the Emperor Shirakawa (1053–1129) the hereditary title of Shokan (Governing officer) of the huge Oe no Mikuriya estate, and in Kyoto he inherited the military charges of Takiguchi no musha (Takiguchi warriors Guards of the Imperial Palace), as well as Emonfu (Government office of the Outer Palace Gate Guards) and Hyoefu (Administrative office of Middle Palace Guards).

Dominating Settsu Province as a focal area of maritime transportation in medieval Japan, the Watanabe family spread its influence widely. Their descendants settled in other areas, including Kyushu.

Watanabe Hisashi (1064-1148 or 1154), also called Minamoto no Hisashi, great-grandson of Tsuna, was appointed Kebiishi (Chief of the police and justice), received the title of Shokan (Governing officer) of Uno no Mikuriya estate in Matsuura (Hizen province, in Kyushu) and called himself Matsuura Hisashi. He ruled the County of Matsuura, the province of Iki, and a part of Sonogi district, and is the ancestor of the Matsuura Watanabe branch, Lords of Hirado castle.

The priest Mongaku Shōnin who urged Minamoto no Yoritomo (1147–1199) to start a war against the Taira, and who managed to get a letter from the Emperor Go-Shirakawa (1127–1192) to Yoritomo, requesting that he set up an army and liberate the country from the tyranny of the Taira, which enabled the Minamoto clan to take up arms, was the son of Watanabe no Endo Mochito.

During the Hōgen rebellion (1156), and the Genpei War (1180–1185), the Watanabe sided with Minamoto no Yorimasa (1106–1180), until his death at the Battle of Uji, then with Minamoto no Yoritomo.

At the Battle of Uji (1180), the opening battle of the Genpei War, the Watanabe clan formed with the warrior monks of Miidera Temple most of the Minamoto clan army.

The Heike Monogatari describes some of the Watanabe samurai present at this battle :

- Watanabe Choshichi Tonō : "He was attired that day in a samurai clothing of light green, and body armour ornamented with cherry blossoms on a yellow ground, and wore a sword with mounts of red copper; in his quiver he carried twenty four arrows feathered with white and under his arm was a bow lacquered in black and bound with red bands".
- Watanabe no Kiō : "clad in a brocaded hunting suit profusely embroidered with chrysanthemums, and wearing a general's armour of scarlet; its name was Kisenaga, and it had been a treasured heirloom for many generations. On his head was a helmet shining with silver stars, and a splendid sword hung at his side. In his quiver were twenty four arrows barred with black on their white feathers, not to speak of the special arrow, feathered with a hawk's wing, always carried by the Imperial Guards of the Takiguchi. His bow was a 'shigeto' of black lacquer with red binding. He rode on (the horse named) Nanryo, while one of his servants followed with a remount and another bore his shield under his arm".

Both were killed in battle. Were also present that day from the Watanabe clan : Minamoto no Sazuku, Minamoto no Tsuranu, Watanabe Habuku, Minamoto no Okoru, and others, who fought to death and were killed fighting against the Taira.

The Watanabe had a powerful navy, and in 1185 they sent their navy ships to support the Minamoto cause.

In February 1185, the Minamoto army of Minamoto no Yoshitsune, brother of Yoritomo, stayed at Watanabe no tsu, in the lands of the Watanabe clan, to rest, gather troops, army provisions, and prepare a fleet of ships for the raid in Shikoku.

At the Battle of Yashima (March 1185) the Watanabe horsemen proved to be decisive, and due to the fall of Yashima, the Taira clan lost their bases in Shikoku.

At the Battle of Dan-no-ura (April 1185), when the Dowager Empress Kenrei-mon-In, daughter of Taira no Kiyomori, tried to drown herself, she was pulled out by the samurai Watanabe no Mutsuru.

=== Kamakura to Muromachi periods ===
After the Genpei war, the Matsuura Watanabe received the additional titles of Gokenin (Direct Retainer of the Shogunate), and of Jitō (Military Governor). During the Mongol invasions (1274 and 1281), the Matsuura Watanabe fought fiercely to repel the invaders. Sashibo, the Soryo (Heir) of the Matsuura Watanabe and his cousin Yamashiro Kai, from the Yamashiro Watanabe branch descending from Oi, sixth son of Watanabe Hisashi, were killed in battle fighting against the Mongols.

The Kamachi were direct descendants of Minamoto no Noboru (848–918), like their cousins of the Watanabe clan, and had the titles of Shokan (Governing officer) of Kanzaki no shō estate (Hizen province), of Gokenin, of Jitō (Military Governor) of the County of Mizuma (Chikugo province), and held the court rank of Kizoku (Officer). Minamoto no Hisanao, son of Watanabe Hisashi, was 'Uhyoe no jo' (Officer of the guards of the Middle Palace), and owner of Mikuriya no shō estate. After the Jōkyū War (1221), Hisanao's son, Minamoto no Sanen, was adopted by the Kamachi as their son in law to succeed their estates and titles; he changed his name to Kamachi, and was the founder of the Kamachi Watanabe branch, Lords of Kamachi castle. At the time of the Mongol invasions, Morohisa went to the front as a member of the Matsuura Watanabe clan.

In 1235, the Watanabe clan received from the Kamakura shogunate the responsibility of overseeing large shipments of tax and tributes due the shogunate from the provinces of western and central Japan

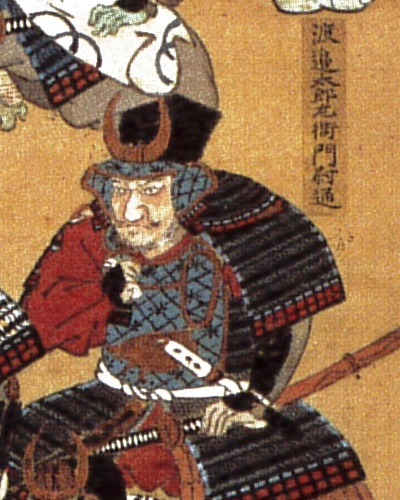
Watanabe Tōru, General of Mōri Motonari

During the period of the Northern and Southern Courts (1336–1392), the Matsuura Watanabe sided with the Northern Court, and fought at the Battle of Chikugogawa (1359). The Kamachi Watanabe sided with the Southern Court, and Takehisa was killed at the Battle of Tatarahama (1336).

Watanabe Mochi, descendant of Watanabe no Tsuna, rendered distinguished military service to the Shogun Ashikaga Takauji (1305–1358), and was granted the title of Jitō (Military Governor) of Yamada no shō territory (Bingo Province). He is the ancestor of the Yamada Watanabe branch, Lords of Ichijoyama castle, who owned the whole area of the Peninsula of Numakuma. During the Ōnin War (1467–1477), they sided with the Eastern camp. They were treated by the Ashikaga Shoguns as equal to a Shugo (Governor of province), and were allowed to use the 'Shirokasabukuro' and 'Mosen kuraoi' seals allowed only to the Shugo in the Muromachi period.

=== Sengoku period ===
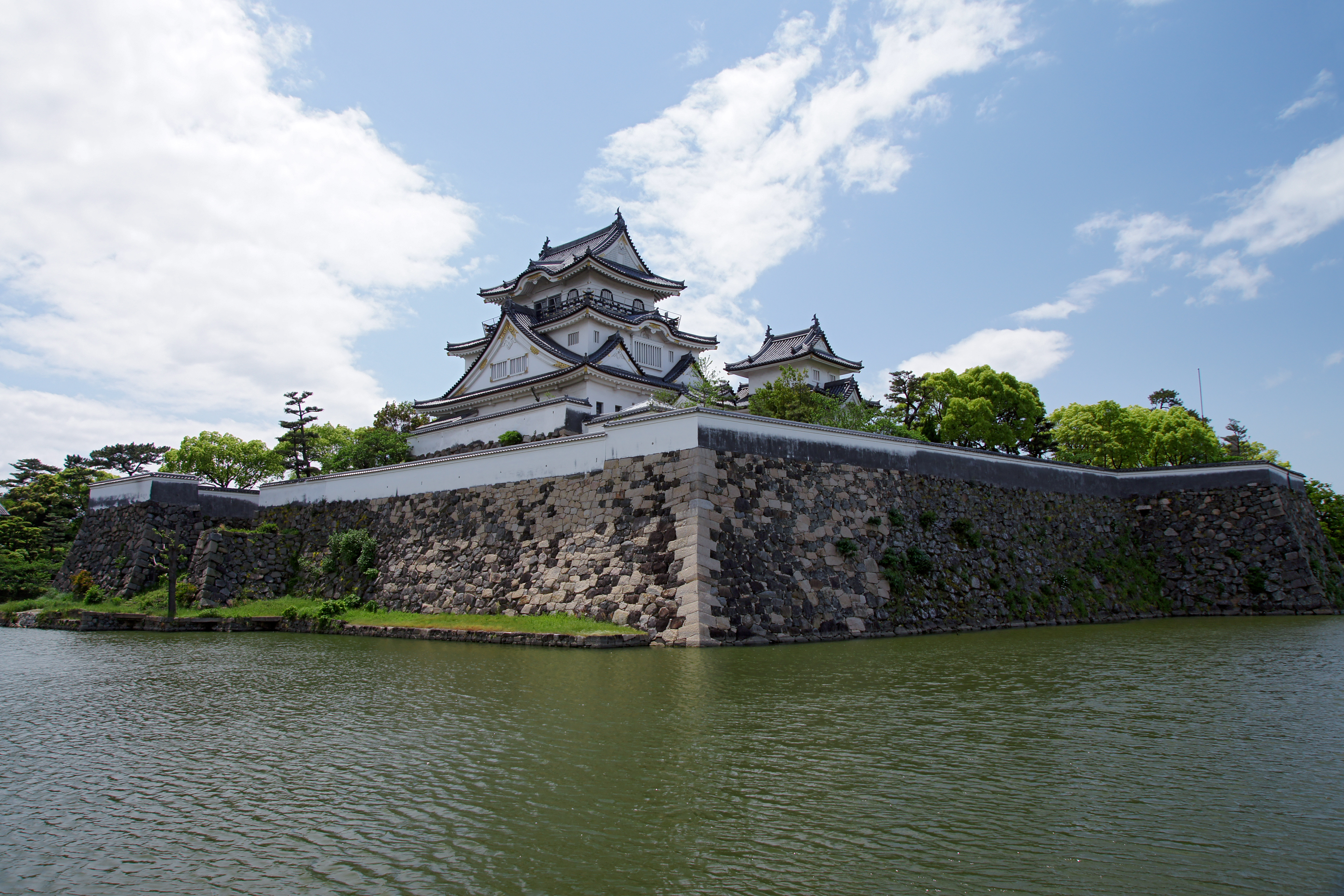
Dungeon of Kishiwada castle

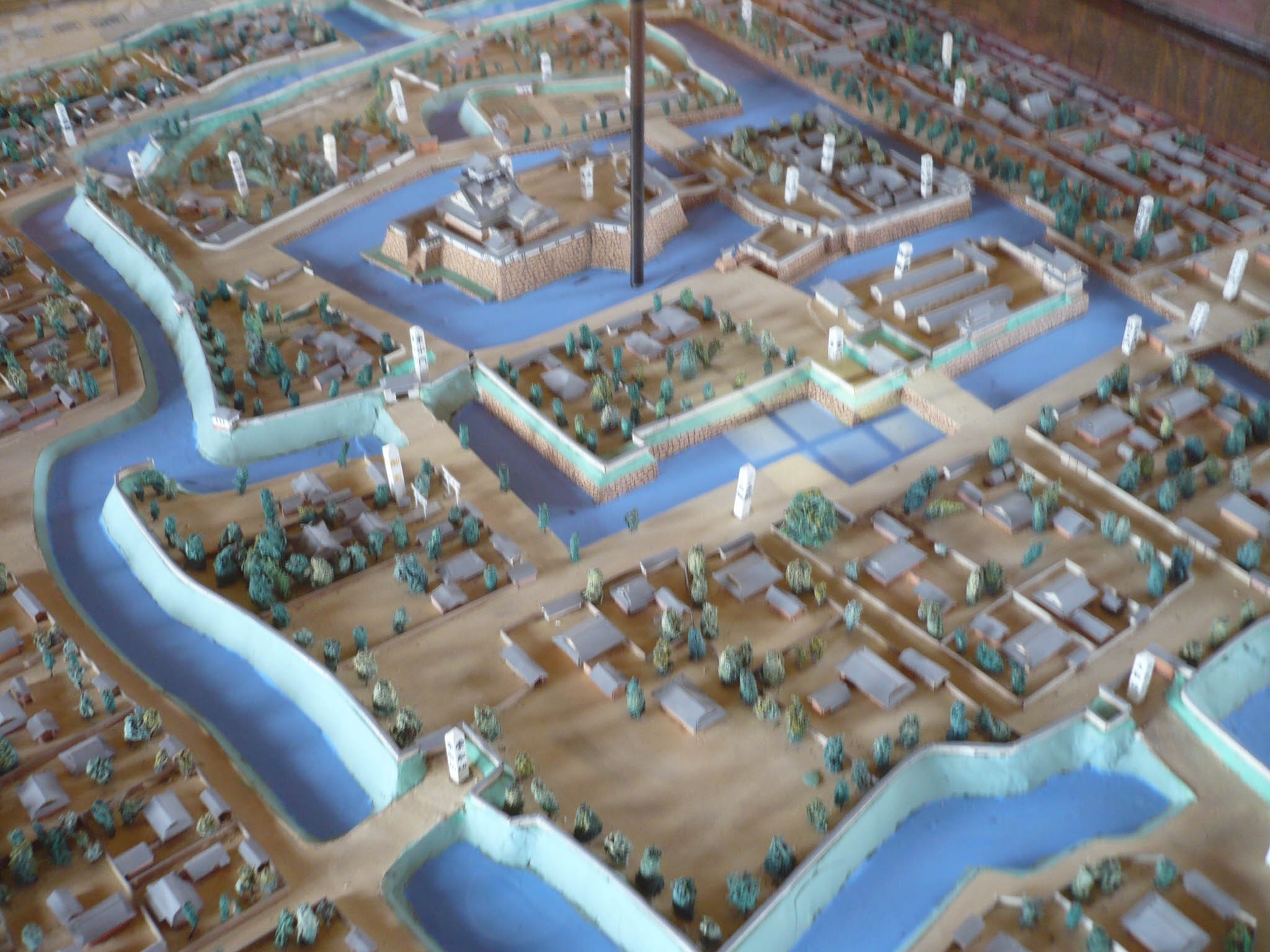
Reconstitution model of Kishiwada Castle

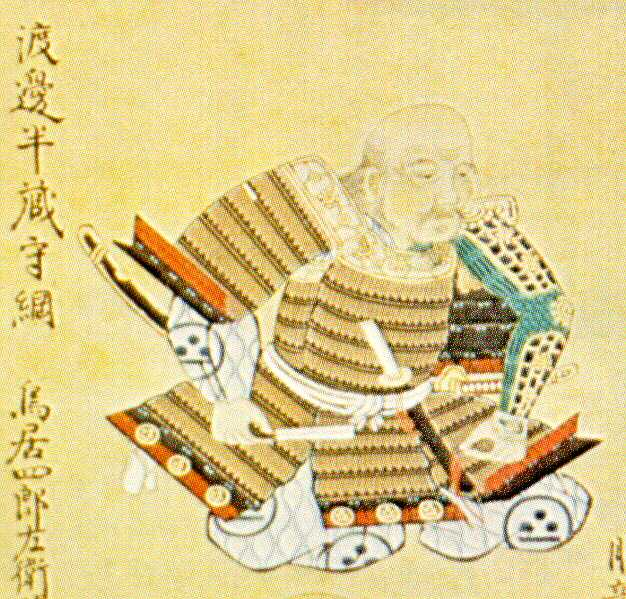
Watanabe Moritsuna, Lord of Terabe castle, and General of the Shogun Tokugawa Ieyasu

During the 16th century wars, the following Watanabe samurai distinguished themselves :

- Watanabe Tōru († 1543), also called Kayo, descendant of the Matsuura Watanabe, was the son of Watanabe Suguru († 1524), Lord of Nagamiyama castle, and was a General of Mōri Motonari. In 1540, at the Battle of Yoshida-Koriyama, he was the Commander of a detached force, attacked a much larger army and defeated Amago Sanehisa's army. In 1543, at the Battle of Gassan-Toda, he was killed in a fierce battle in place of Motonari. After that the Mōri clan continued to give important posts to the Watanabe family, and the Watanabe clan members were honored at the head of the Choshu Mōri Domain's New Year's Kachu-kaiki ceremony for generations.
- Watanabe Hajime (1534–1612), son of Watanabe Tōru, fought at the Battle of Kanbe (1548), against the Hiraga clan of Takayatozaki castle (1551), against the Miya clan of Takiyama castle (1552), at Miyajima (1555) and Moji (1561). In 1586, he took part in the invasion of Kyushu, and in 1588, he went to Kyoto with Mōri Terumoto, and received from Toyotomi Hideyoshi the title of Hida no kami (Governor of Hida Province). He is listed as one of the eighteen Generals of the Mōri.
- Watanabe Tadasu († 1615) was a descendant of the Matsuura Watanabe, and a retainer of the Toyotomi clan. He took a part in the Battle of Dōmyōji (1615), in the Battle of Tennōji (1615), and died at the Siege of Osaka castle (1615).
- Watanabe Motoharu, of the Yamada Watanabe branch, Jitō (Military Governor) of Yamada, Lord of Ichijoyama castle, was a direct retainer of the Shogun Ashikaga Yoshiaki (1537–1597). At the Battle of Sekigahara, he fought against Tokugawa Ieyasu. After that his family was deprived of their fiefs.
- The Matsuura Watanabe of Izumi, were Shugodai (vice-Governors) of Izumi province and Lords of Kishiwada Castle. In 1527, they were involved in the administration of Izumi province as Shugodai, and in 1548 they sided with the Miyoshi clan . However when Magohachiro succeeded his father, he was still a child, and the Miyoshi while recognizing his position, sent their troops in Kishiwada Castle to protect the young lord. In 1562, Tora became Lord of Kishiwada with the aid of the Miyoshi army, but the Lordship changed again to his cousin Magohachiro, also called Hikaru, who later became Hizen no kami (Governor of Hizen Province). In 1585, Munekiyo with Nakamura Kazuuji and 8,000 men were besieged by 30,000 men (Battle of Kishiwada), and the castle was rebuilt as the base of Toyotomi Hideyoshi's conquest of Kishu. For his military achievement, Munekiyo was given additional territories and transferred to Ise Province. Hisanobu, also called Hideto, was Lord of Ise Iyo castle, Iyo no Kami (Governor of Iyo province), and the General of the gun division of Toyotomi Hideyoshi; during the Sekigahara campaign, he was killed at the Battle of Anotsu (1600). At the Battle of Sekigahara (1600), they sided against the Tokugawa, and were deprived of their fiefs.
- Watanabe Moritsuna (1542–1620), descended from the Matsuura Watanabe, through Watanabe Yasushi, grandson of Matsuura Hisashi, great-grandson of Watanabe no Tsuna. His ancestors were direct retainers of the Ashikaga Shoguns, and later moved to Mikawa province, thence they were called the Mikawa Watanabe branch. He joined Tokugawa Ieyasu in 1557, and fought at the Battles of Yawata (1562), Anegawa (1570), Mikatagahara (1573), Nagashino (1575), Komaki and Nagakute (1584), and the Siege of Osaka (1614–1615). He is listed as one of the sixteen Generals of Tokugawa Ieyasu. He was the Lord of Terabe castle, General of the Shogun Tokugawa Ieyasu (1543–1616), and is the ancestor of the Hakata Watanabe branch, Lords of Hakata, and the Hanzo Watanabe branch, Lords of Terabe, and Hida no Kami (Governors of Hida province).

=== Edo period to the Meiji Restoration ===
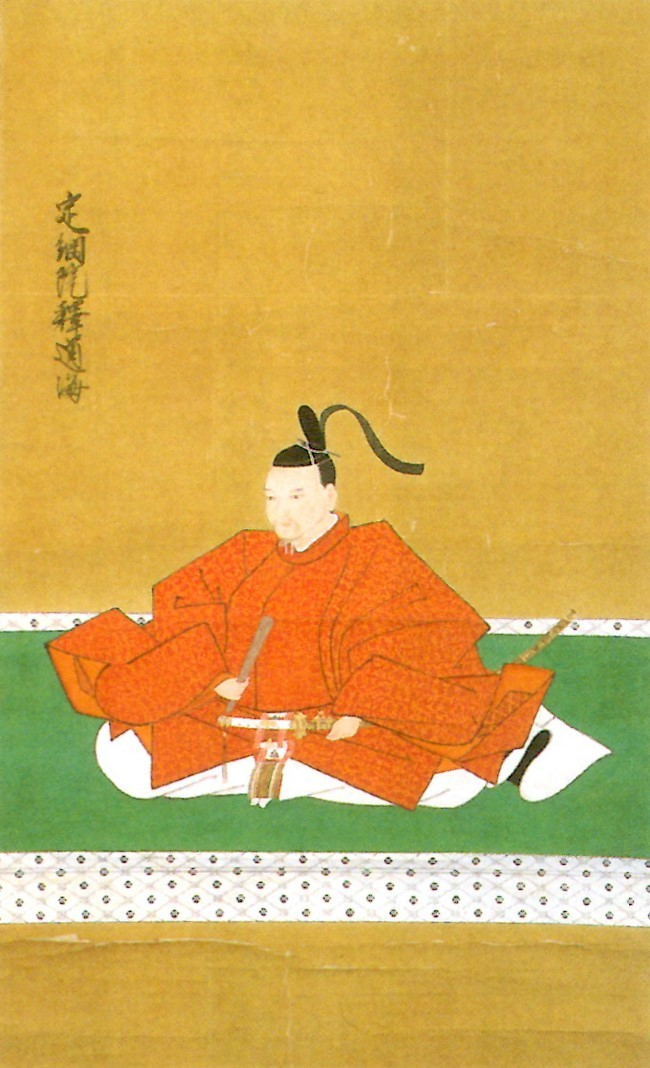
Watanabe Sadatsuna (1668–1715), fifth head of the Hanzo Watanabe branch, Karō (Chief retainer) of the Owari Tokugawa, Lord of Terabe estate and Hida no Kami (Governor of Hida province)

Besides the mainstream of Watanabe, the Matsuura branch, had the title of Daimyō (Grand feudal Lords) of Hirado Domain (Hizen Province) until 1868, were the most famous and flourished branch, and had a revenue of 61,700 koku. The territories of the Lords of Hirado included the Province of Iki (with the County of Iki (11 villages), and the County of Ishida (11 villages)); in the Province of Hizen : the County of Matsuura (47 villages), and 7 villages in the County of Sonogi.

The Matsuura Watanabe of Hirado Shinden, Daimyō of Hirado Shinden Domain (Hizen Province) until 1868, descending from the fourth Lord of Hirado, was given 10,000 koku, and established a branch domain.

The Hakata Watanabe branch, were Daimyō (Grand feudal Lords) of Hakata Domain (Izumi Province) until the Meiji Restoration (1868), had a revenue of 13,500 koku, and descend from Watanabe Yoshitsuna (1611–1668), who was appointed Sobayonin (Grand Chamberlain) by Tokugawa Ietsuna (1651–1680), the 4th Tokugawa Shogun, and was the grandson of Moritsuna. The territories of the Lords of Hakata included in the province of Izumi : 12 villages in the County of Otori, 4 villages in the County of Izumi; in the province of Kawachi : 5 villages in the County of Furuichi, 5 villages in the County of Shiki, and 2 villages in the County of Tanboku; in the province of Omi : 1 village in the County of Kurita, 2 villages in the County of Yasu, 2 villages in the County of Gamo, and 6 villages in the County of Takashima.

The Hanzo Watanabe branch, descending from Watanabe Shigetsuna (1574–1648), son of Moritsuna, were lords of Terabe estate, Hida no Kami (Governors of Hida province), Karō (Chief retainers) of the Owari Tokugawa, and had a revenue of 10,000 koku. After 1868, they were raised to the Peerage.

The Watanabe of Ōmura (Hizen Province) were ranked among the Peers after 1868.

The Watanabe of Suwa (Shinano Province) were also raised to the Peerage after 1868.

Several Watanabe samurai had the title of Taishin (Grand) Hatamoto (Guardians of the Banner), the last rank before Daimyo, direct retainers of the Shogunate, high ranking samurai, and senior retainers of the Tokugawa Shoguns and their principal branches, like the descendants of :

- Watanabe Terutsuna, Noto no Kami (Governor of Noto province), and Taishin Hatamoto with a revenue of 6,000 koku.
- Watanabe Zonosuke, a Taishin Hatamoto.
- Watanabe Shinzaemon, younger brother of Moritsuna, and ancestor of the Shinzaemon Watanabe branch, senior retainers of the Owari Tokugawa. His descendant, Watanabe Aritsuna (1820–1868), was the Commander of the Owari Tokugawa army; he fought at the first Choshu war (1864), the second Choshu war (1865), and was killed in 1868.
- Watanabe Tozutsuna, Karō (Chief retainer) of the Tayasu Tokugawa, and of the Hitotsubashi Tokugawa.
- Watanabe Naotsuna, Wakasa no Kami (Governor of Wakasa province), had a revenue of 8,000 koku, and was the founder of the Wakasa Watanabe branch, Karō (Chief retainers) of the Kishū Tokugawa.

== Gallery ==
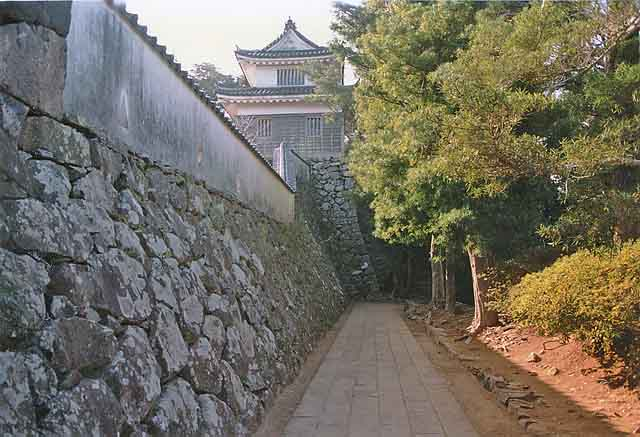
Hirado Castle

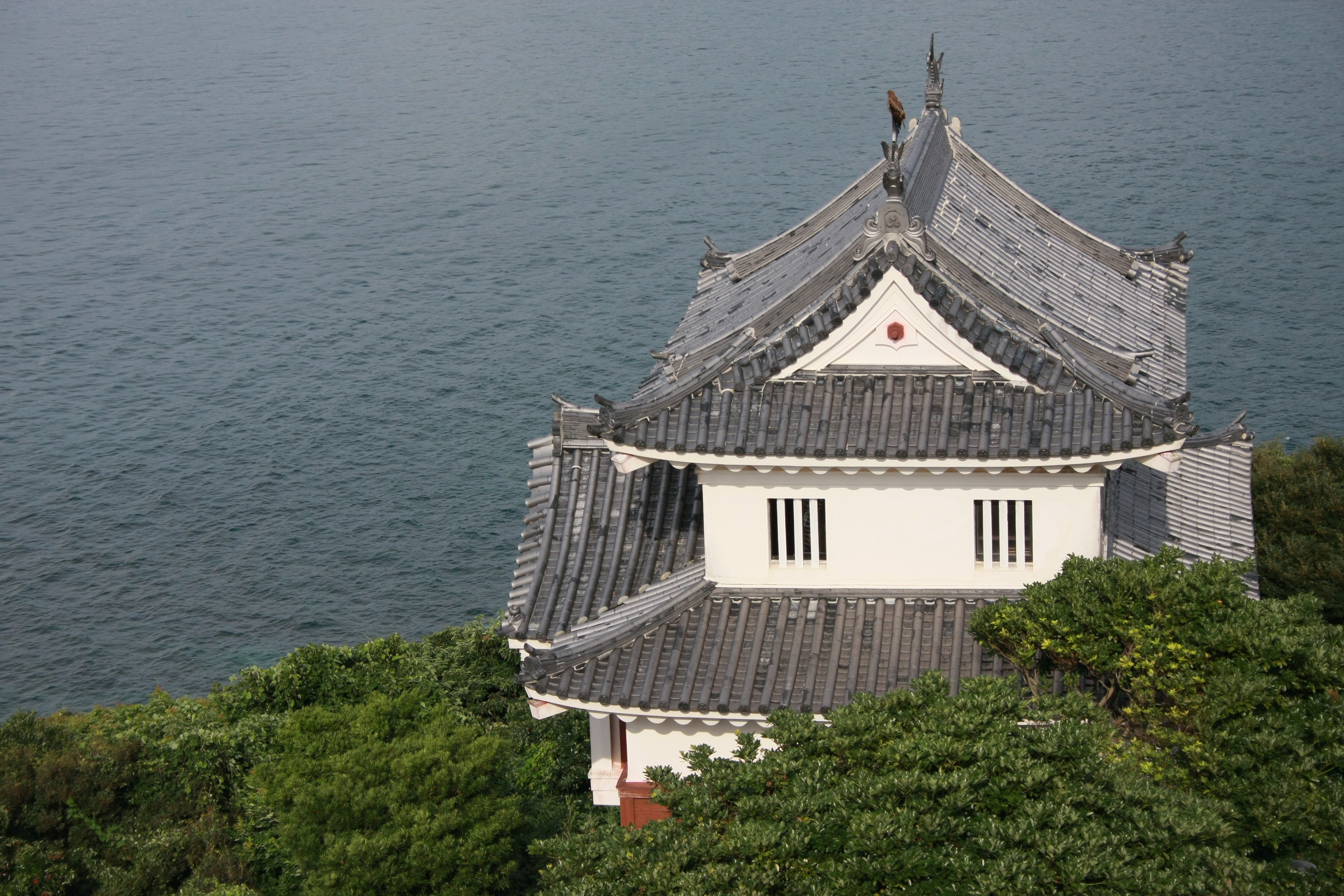
Hirado Castle : Observation tower

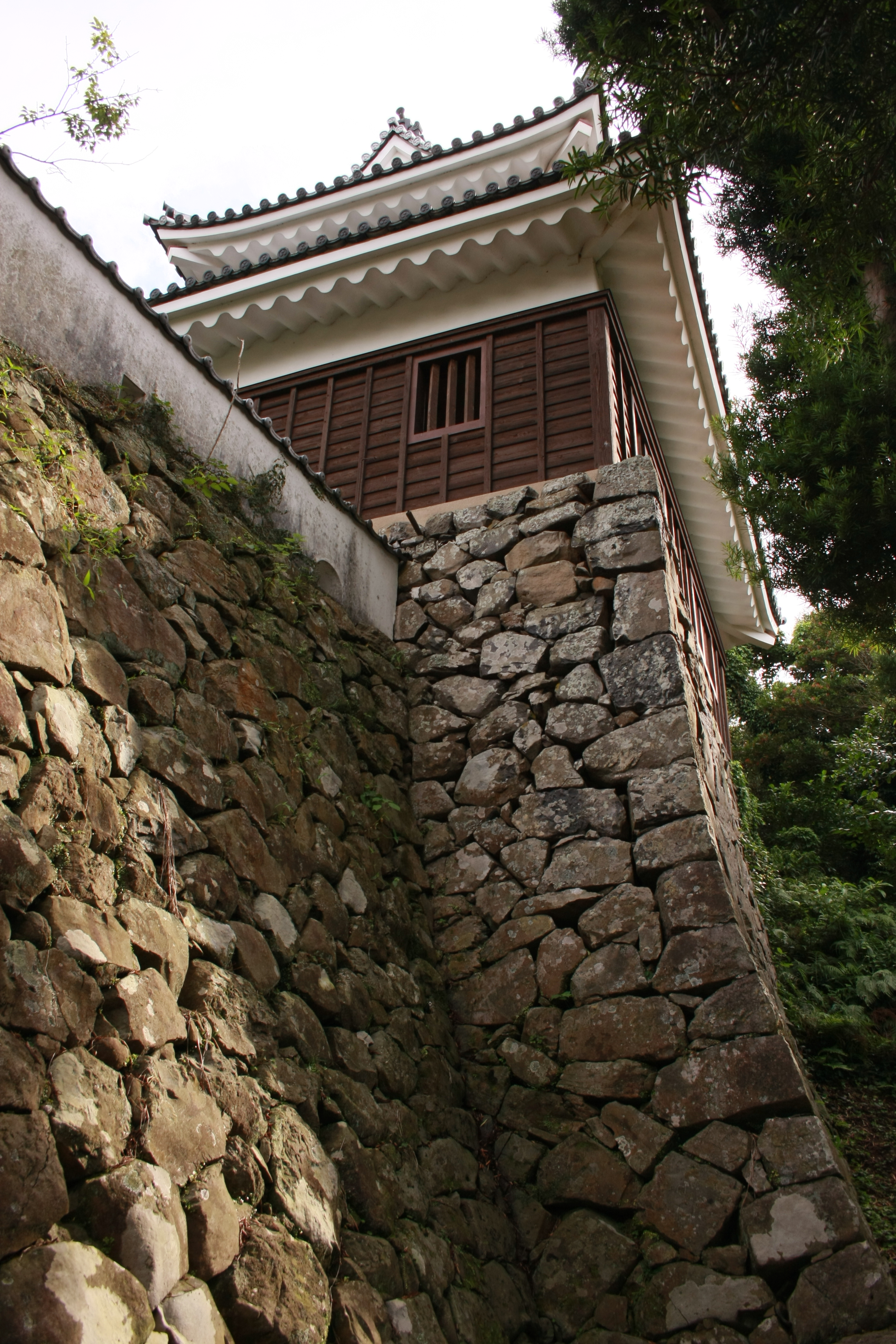
Hirado Castle : Jizosaka tower

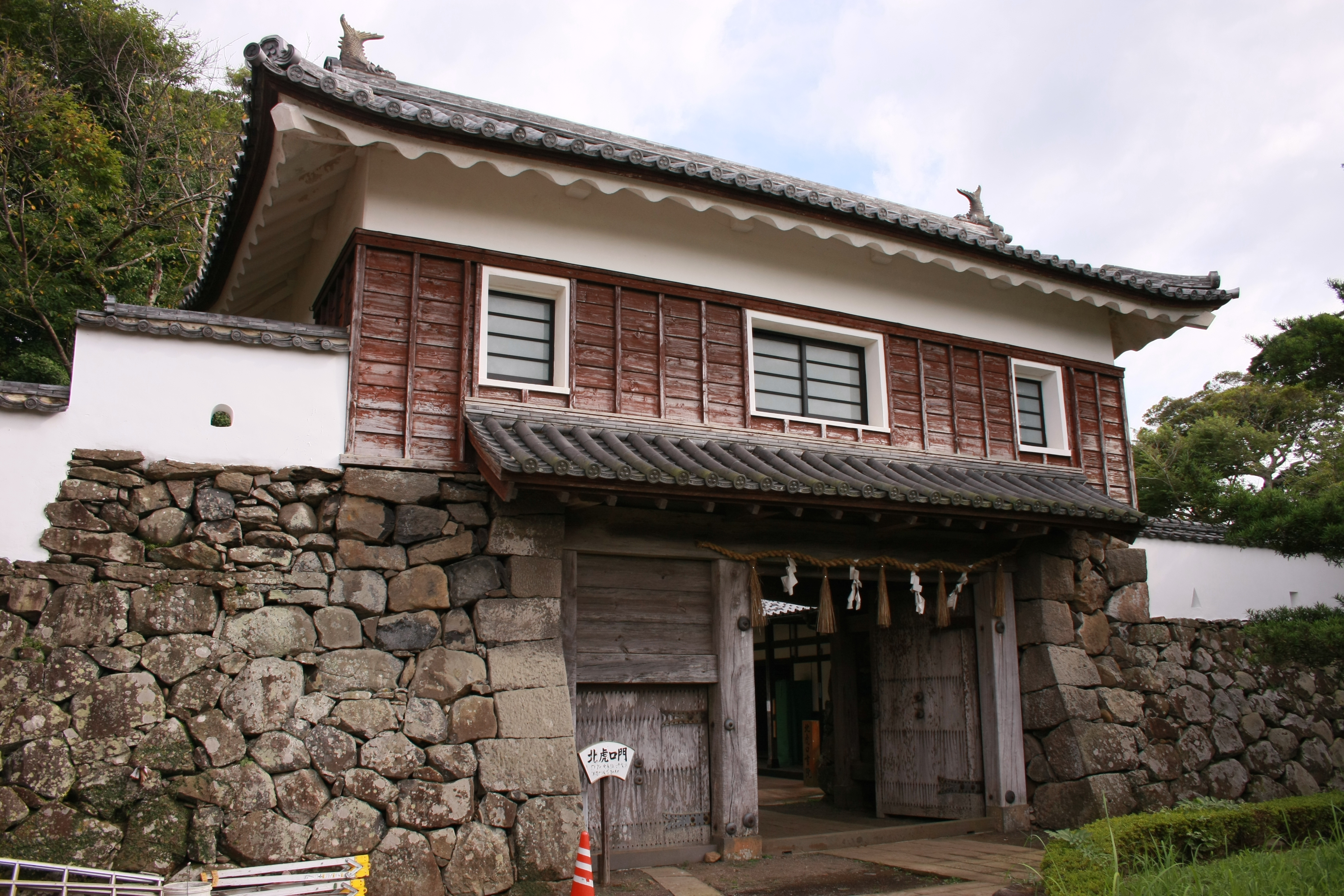
Hirado Castle : North Tiger Gate

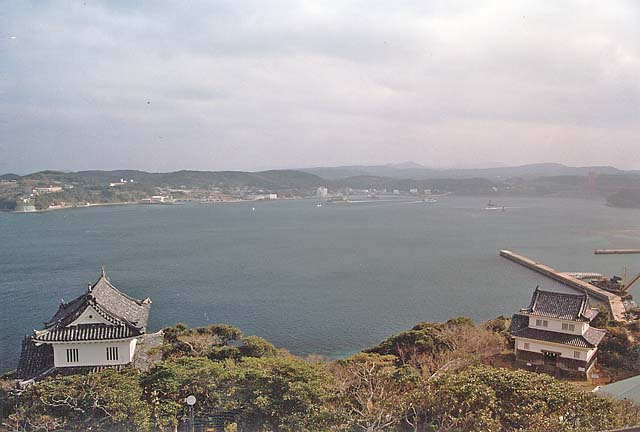
Hirado Castle stands on an island off Kyūshū.

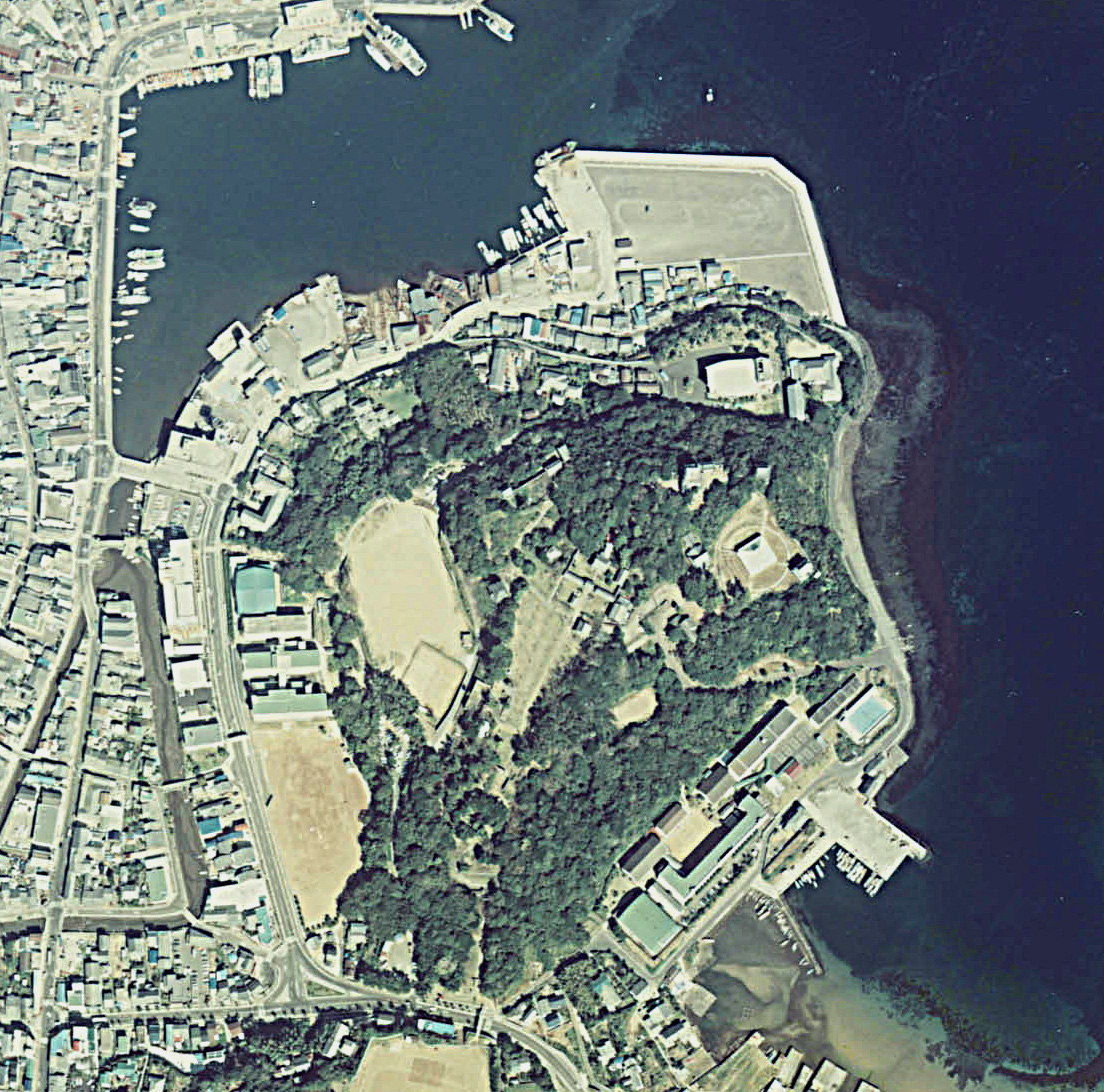
Aerial photo of Hirado Castle

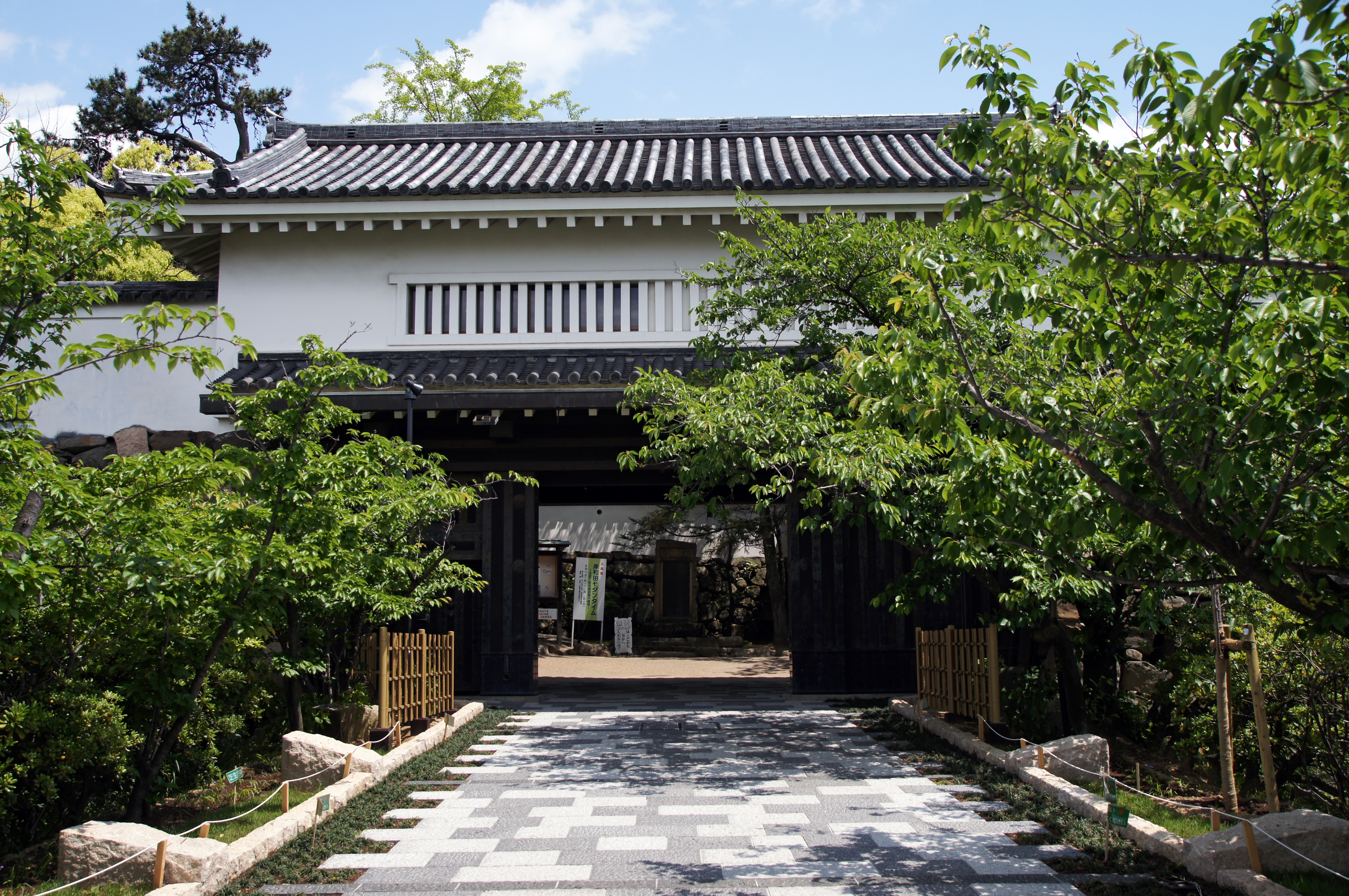
Honmaru Gate of Kishiwada Castle (there were a total of 15 gates)

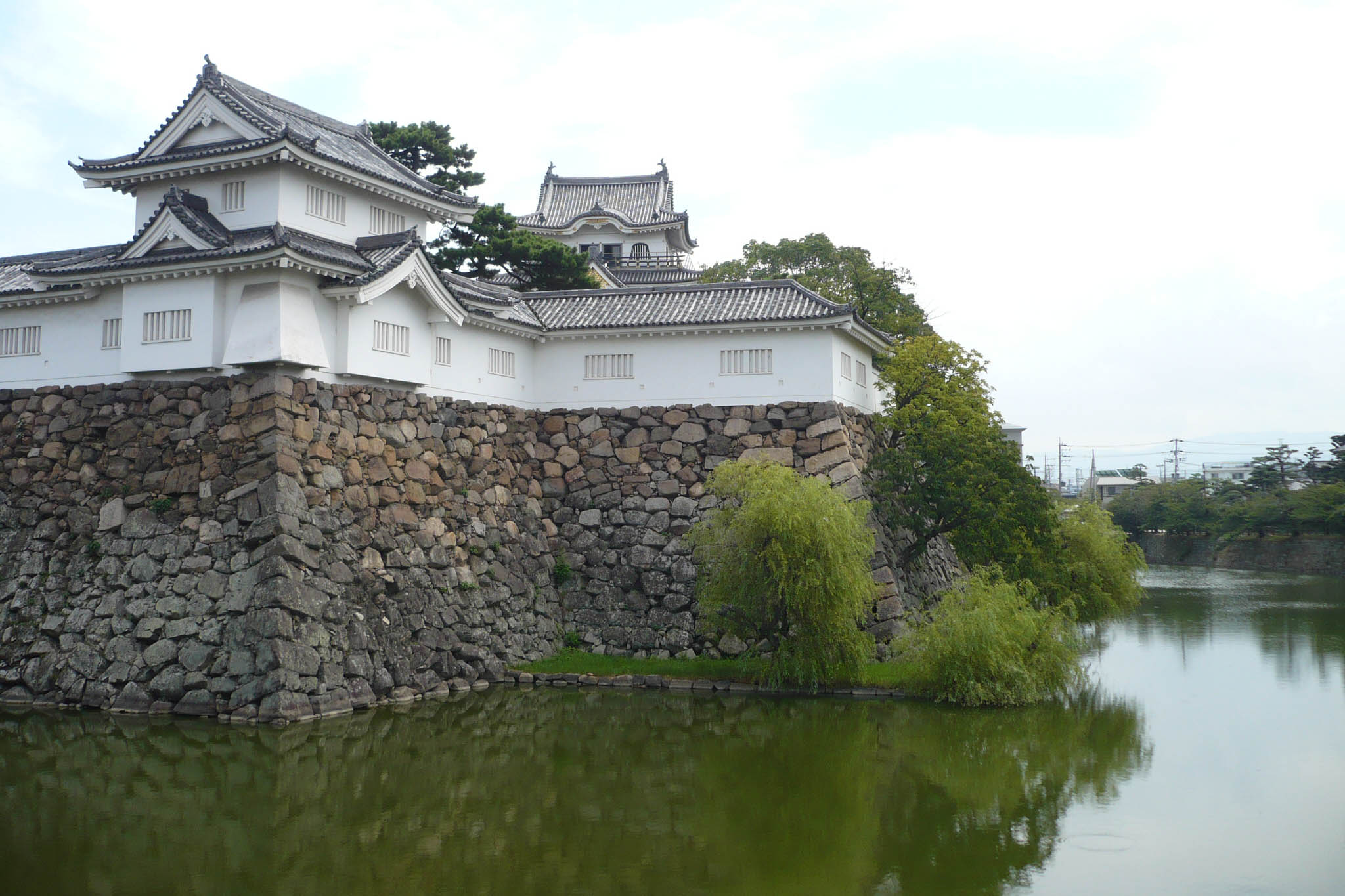
Kishiwada Castle

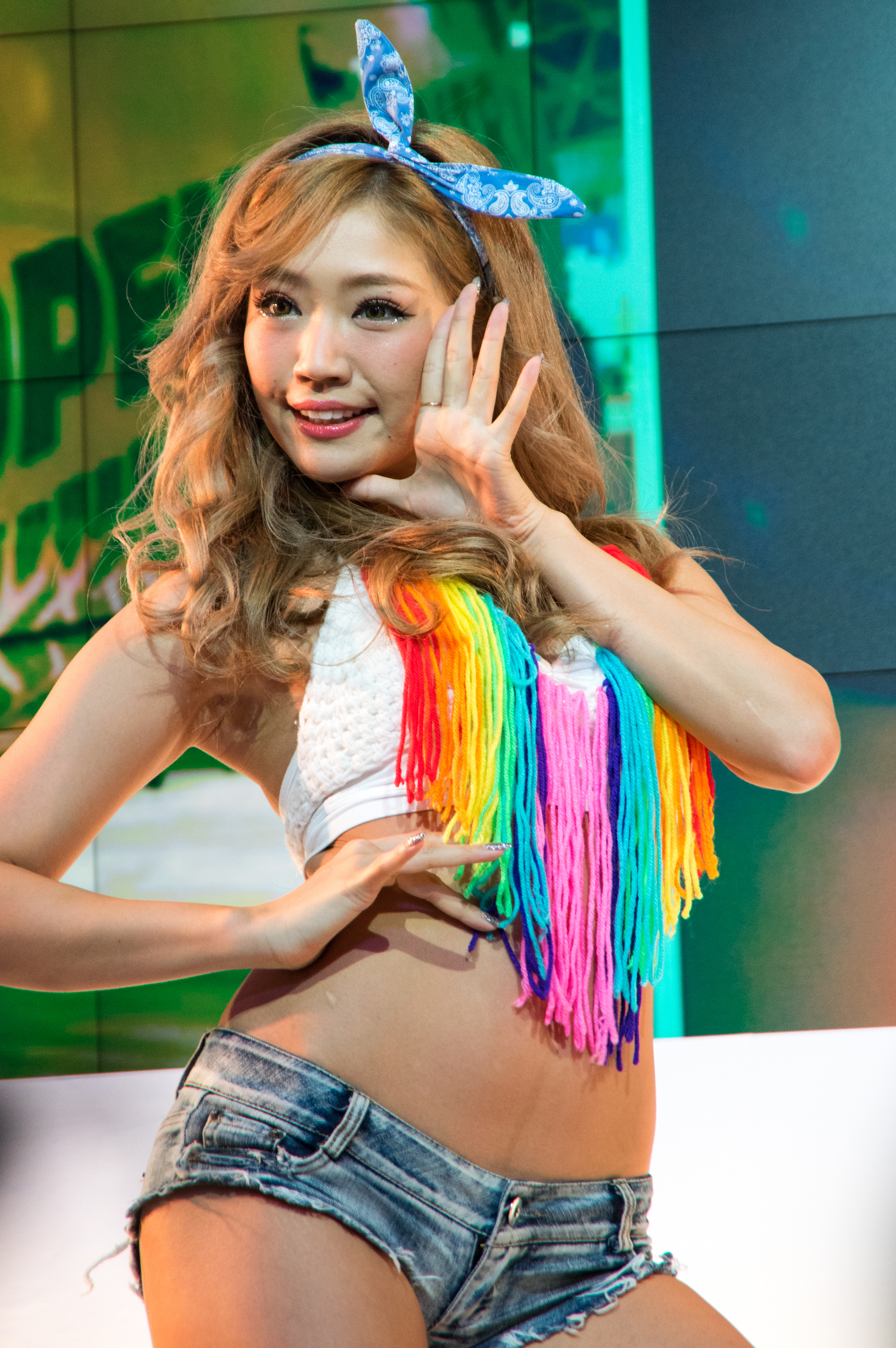
Kazue Watanabe

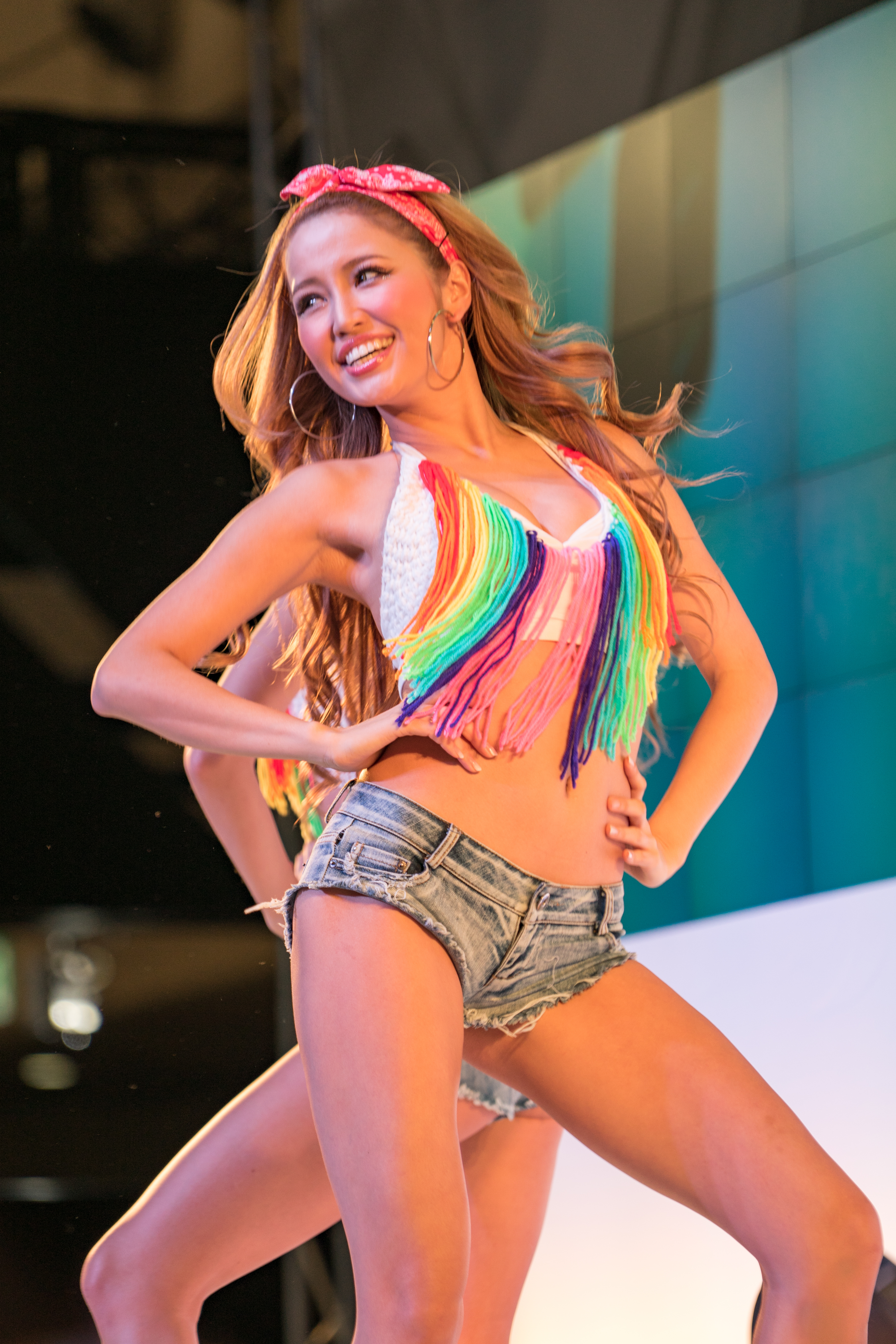
Kanae Watanabe

== Miscellaneous ==
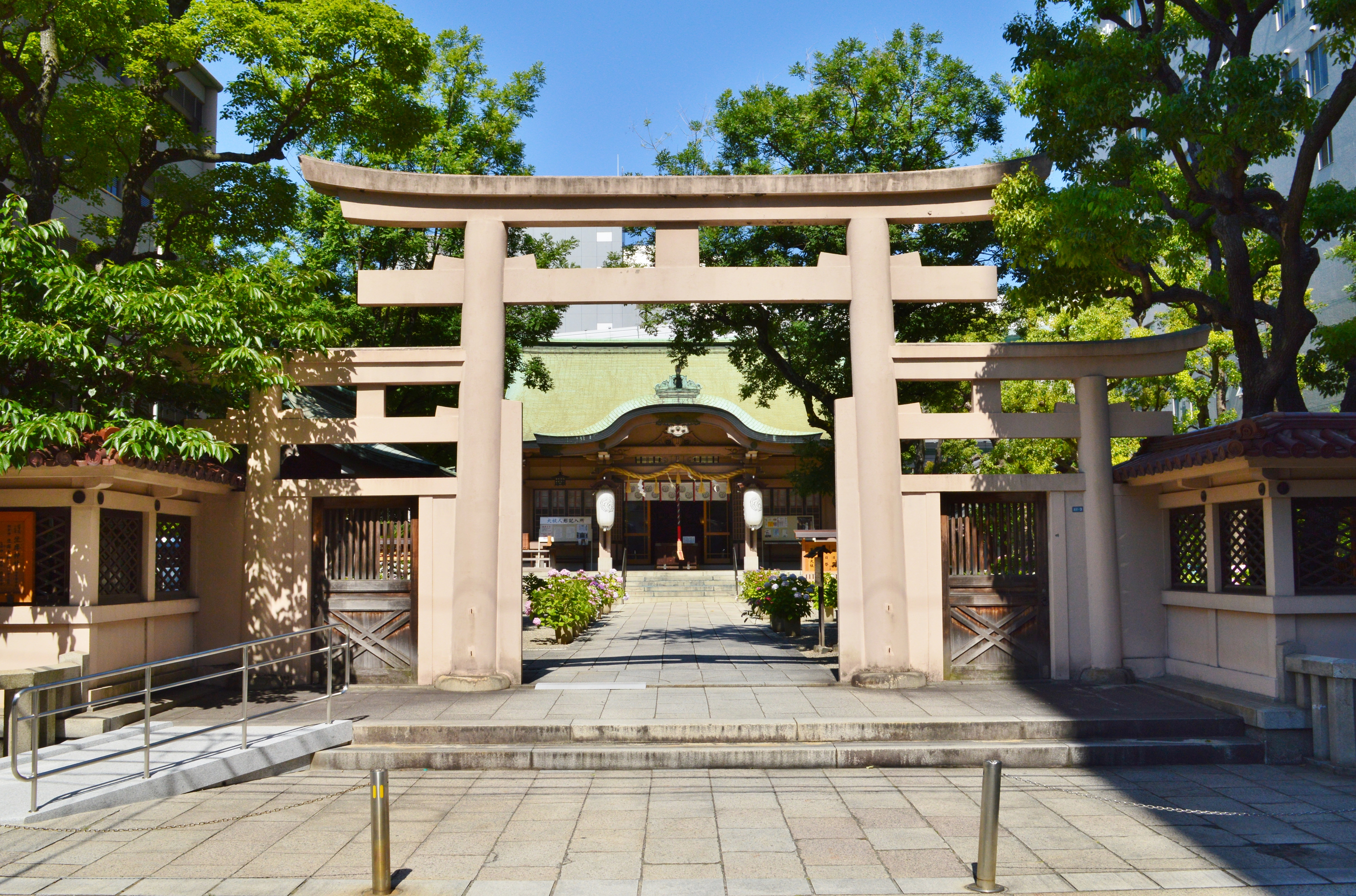
Zama jinja : Mitsutorii

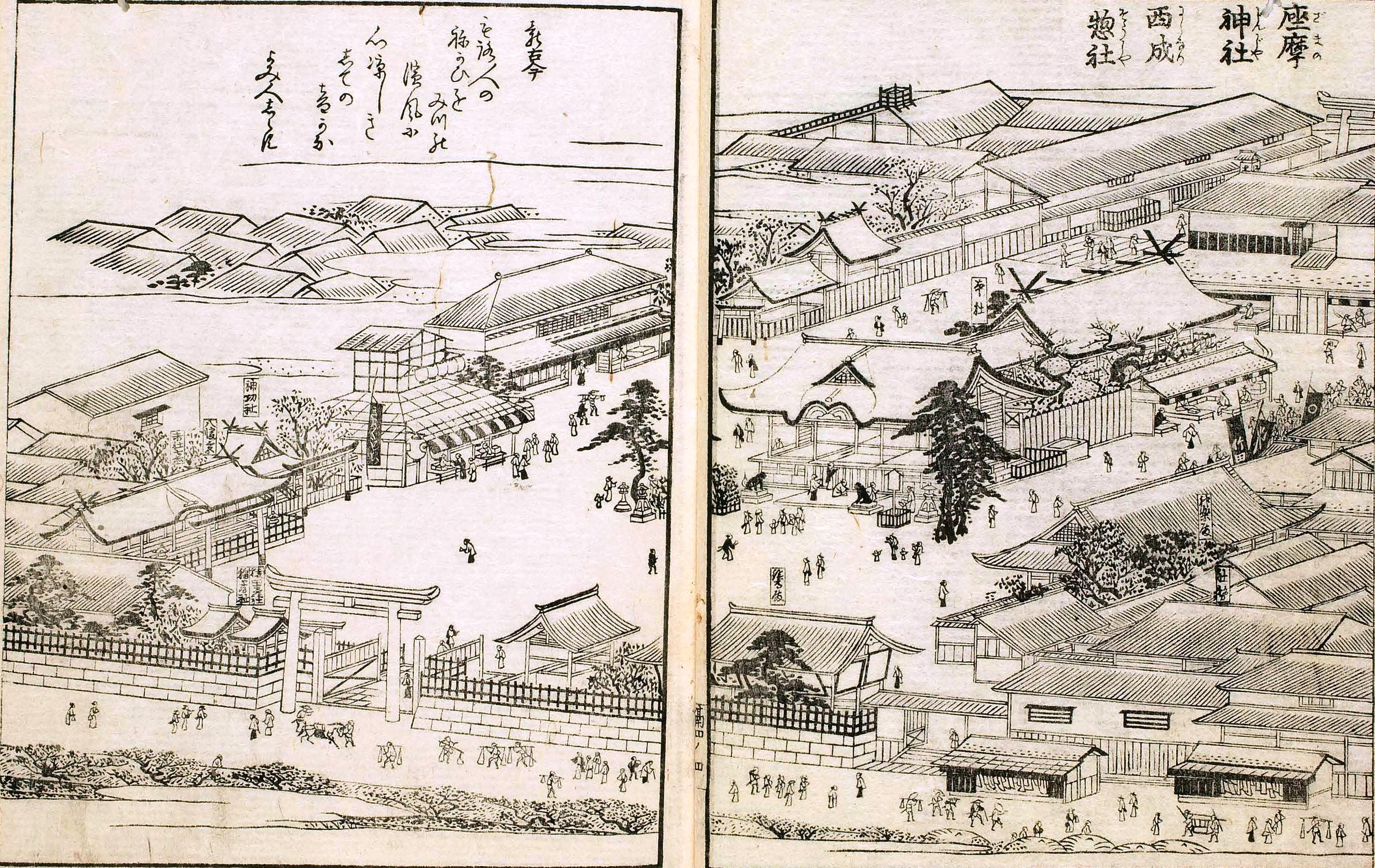
Zama jinja, as published in the 18th century

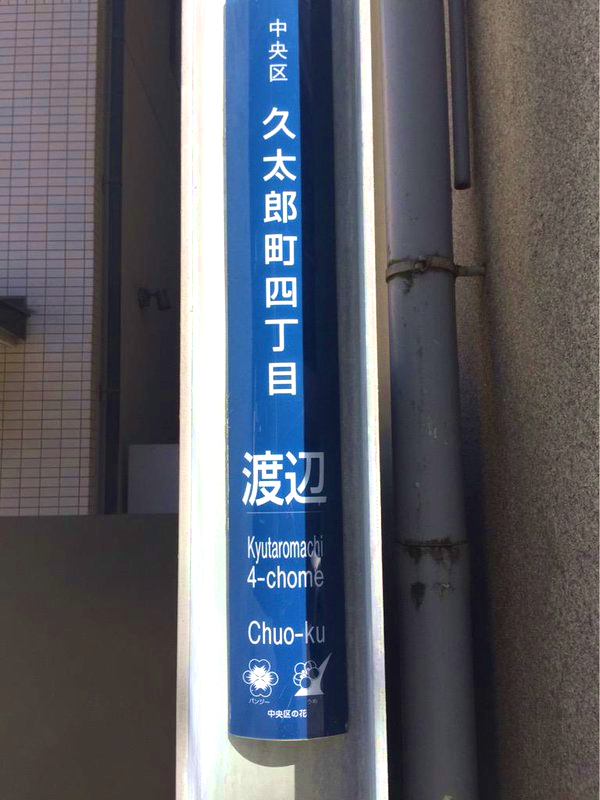
Address of "4-chome Watanabe, Kyutaromachi, Chuo Ward, Osaka City"

渡辺, means ‘to cross over a river’. Even by the standards of Japanese names, there is an unusual degree of variation in the second kanji used to write Watanabe, with at least 51 recorded variants including the common 渡部, 渡邉 and 渡邊.

According to the 'Japanese Family Names and Family Crests', the surname Watanabe is a toponymic surname (and never an occupational surname). In Japan, there are very few occupational surnames, and unlike in several European countries, in Japan, occupational surnames are the exceptions. The surname Watanabe is not considered one of these very few occupational exceptions. A basic translation of the name of the original village 渡辺 is ‘to cross over a river’, and sometimes people mistakenly write that the Watanabe are 'river crossers' which is incorrect.

The location called 'Watanabe no tsu' was located between Tenmabashi Station and Tenjinbashi Station, in the present day Osaka City.

Watanabe no Tsuna took charge of Zama jinja Temple, also called Ikasuri Shrine. The hereditary guji (chief priest) of the temple were descending from Watanabe Kaoru, descendant of Watanabe no Tsuna. The original site of the shrine was different from the current one, and the main hall was in the place where Watanabe no tsu used to be. Toyotomi Hideyoshi relocated to its current location near Nishiyokoborikawa River, at the address 3 Watanabe, 4-chome Watanabe, Kyutaromachi, Chuo Ward, Osaka City.

It is the fifth most common Japanese surname.

In the context of the Japanese economy, Mrs. Watanabe is a generic name for housewives who deal in foreign exchange.

== People with the surname ==
=== A ===
- Akane Watanabe (渡邉 あかね; born 1994), Japanese badminton player
- Akeno Watanabe (渡辺 明乃; born 1982), Japanese voice actress
- Akeo Watanabe (渡邉 暁雄; 1919–1990), Japanese composer
- Akio Watanabe (渡辺 明夫; born 1969), Japanese animator
- Akira Watanabe (art director) (渡辺 明; 1908–1999), Japanese special effects art director
- Akira Watanabe (渡辺 章; 1937–2003), better known as Fujinishiki, Japanese sumo wrestler
- Akira Watanabe (motorcyclist) (渡辺 明; born 1954), Japanese motocross racer
- Akira Watanabe (Scouting) (渡辺 昭; 1901–2005), Japanese Scouting leader
- Akira Watanabe (shogi) (渡辺 明; born 1984), Japanese shogi player
- Anne Watanabe (渡辺 杏; born 1986), Japanese model, actress and singer
- Asako Watanabe (渡辺 麻子; born 1959), Japanese sprint canoeist
- Atsushi Watanabe (politician) (渡部 篤; born 1952), Japanese politician
- Atsushi Watanabe (actor, born 1898) (渡辺 篤; 1898–1977), Japanese actor
- Atsushi Watanabe (actor, born 1947) (渡辺 篤史), Japanese actor
- Atsuo Watanabe (渡辺 敦夫; born 1974), Japanese footballer
- Ayako Watanabe (渡辺 绫子; 1937–1970), Japanese murder victim
- Ayumu Watanabe (渡辺 歩; born 1966), Japanese anime director
- Azusa Watanabe (渡辺 梓; born 1969), Japanese actress

=== C ===
- Chiho Watanabe (渡辺 千穂; born 1972), Japanese screenwriter
- Chikako Watanabe (渡辺 愛子), vocalist with the Japanese band NaNa
- Chitetsu Watanabe (渡邉 智哲; born 1907), Japanese supercentenarian
- Corinne Watanabe (born 1950), American judge

=== D ===
- Daigo Watanabe (渡邉 大剛; born 1984), Japanese footballer
- Daisuke Watanabe (渡辺 大祐; born 1974), Japanese video game writer
- Daisuke Watanabe (actor) (渡辺 大輔; born 1982), Japanese actor
- Daisuke Watanabe (long jumper) (渡辺 大輔; born 1975), Japanese long jumper

=== E ===
- Emi Watanabe (渡部 絵美; born 1959), Japanese figure skater
- Eri Watanabe (渡辺 えり子; born 1955), Japanese actress

=== G ===
- Gedde Watanabe (born 1955), American actor and comedian
- Graham Watanabe (born 1982), American snowboarder
- Greg Watanabe (born 1967), American actor

=== H ===
- Hajime Watanabe (disambiguation), multiple people
- Haruto Watanabe (渡辺温斗, 2004), Member of Treasure, K-Pop group from YG Entertainment
- Hamako Watanabe (渡辺 はま子; 1910–1999), Japanese singer
- Haruka Watanabe (渡邉 はる香; born 1972), Japanese ice hockey player
- Hazuki Watanabe (渡辺 はずき; born 2004), Japanese artistic gymnast
- Hideo Watanabe (渡辺 秀央; born 1934), Japanese politician
- Hirobumi Watanabe (渡辺 紘文; born 1982), Japanese film director
- Hirofumi Watanabe (渡部 博文; born 1987), Japanese footballer
- Hiroki Watanabe (渡辺 宏樹; born 1988), Japanese sprint canoeist
- Hiromichi Watanabe (渡辺 博道; born 1950), Japanese politician
- Hiromu Watanabe (渡辺 大夢; born 1988), Japanese shogi player
- Hiroshi Watanabe (animator) (わたなべ ひろし), Japanese animation director
- Hiroshi Watanabe (equestrian) (渡辺 弘; born 1947), Japanese equestrian
- Hiroshi Watanabe (photographer) (渡邉 博史; born 1951), Japanese photographer
- Hiroshi Watanabe (weightlifter) (渡辺 博; born 1967), Japanese weightlifter
- Hirotoshi Watanabe (王貞治; 1948–2016), Japanese baseball player
- Hiroyuki Watanabe (渡辺 裕之; 1955-2022), Japanese actor
- Hisanobu Watanabe (渡辺 久信; born 1965), Japanese baseball player and manager
- Hitomi Watanabe (渡辺 眸; born 1939), Japanese photographer
- Hyuga Watanabe (渡辺 陽向; born 1994), Japanese motorcycle racer

=== I ===
- Ippei Watanabe (footballer) (渡辺 一平; born 1969), Japanese footballer
- Ippei Watanabe (swimmer) (渡辺 一平; born 1997), Japanese swimmer

=== J ===
- Jin Watanabe (handball player) (渡部 仁; born 1990), Japanese handball player
- Jiro Watanabe (渡辺 二郎; born 1955), Japanese boxer and yakuza
- Jolene Watanabe (born 1968), American tennis player
- José Watanabe (1946–2007), Peruvian poet
- Jōtarō Watanabe (渡辺 錠太郎; 1874–1936), Japanese general
- Jun Watanabe (actor) (渡辺 淳; born 1982), Japanese actor
- Jun Watanabe (architect) (渡辺 純; born 1954), Japanese architect
- Junichi Watanabe (渡辺 淳一; 1933–2014), Japanese writer
- Junichi Watanabe (footballer) (渡辺 淳一; born 1973), Japanese footballer
- Junji Watanabe (渡部 惇二; born 1944), Japanese boxer
- Junya Watanabe (渡辺 淳弥; born 1961), Japanese fashion designer

=== K ===
- Kaichi Watanabe (渡邊 嘉一; 1858–1932), Japanese engineer
- Kanako Watanabe (渡部 香生子; born 1996), Japanese swimmer
- Kanendo Watanabe (渡辺 兼人; born 1947), Japanese photographer
- Katei Watanabe (渡辺 霞亭; 1884–1926), Japanese writer
- Kathy Watanabe, American politician
- Katsuaki Watanabe (渡辺 捷昭; born 1943), President of Toyota Motor Corporation
- Katsuji Watanabe (渡辺 勝治; born 1940), Japanese boxer
- Katsumi Watanabe (渡部 勝美), Japanese baseball player
- Kazan Watanabe (渡辺 崋山; 1793–1841), Japanese painter, scholar and statesman
- Kazuhisa Watanabe (渡邉 一久; born 1983), Japanese boxer, kickboxer and mixed martial artist
- Kazuhito Watanabe (渡邊 一仁; born 1986), Japanese footballer
- Kazuki Watanabe (disambiguation)
- Kazuko Watanabe (渡辺 和子; 1927–2016), Japanese Roman Catholic nun, educator and writer
- Kazuma Watanabe (渡邉 千真; born 1986), Japanese footballer
- Kazuma Watanabe (motorcycle racer) (渡辺 一馬; born 1990), Japanese motorcycle racer
- Kazumi Watanabe (渡辺 香津美; born 1953), Japanese musician
- Kazumi Watanabe (athlete) (渡辺 和己; 1935-2022), Japanese long-distance runner
- Kazumi Watanabe (sport shooter) (渡辺 和三; 1947–1996), Japanese sport shooter
- Kazunari Watanabe (渡邉 一成; born 1983), Japanese cyclist
- Kazuo Watanabe (渡辺 和夫; born 1938), Japanese swimmer
- Kazuro Watanabe (渡辺 和郎; born 1955), Japanese amateur astronomer and discoverer of minor planets
- Kazutami Watanabe (渡邊 一民; 1932–2013), Japanese scholar and translator
- Keiji Watanabe (渡邊 圭二; born 1985), Japanese footballer
- Keiko Watanabe (渡部 恵子; born 1987), Japanese voice actress
- Keita Watanabe (渡辺 啓太; born 1992), Japanese speed skater
- Ken Watanabe (渡辺 謙; born 1959), Japanese actor
- Kiiko Watanabe, Japanese table tennis player
- Kiyomi Watanabe (渡辺 聖未; born 1996), Japanese-Filipino judoka
- Kodai Watanabe (渡辺 広大; born 1986), Japanese footballer
- Koji Watanabe (渡邊 康二; born 1942), Japanese tennis player
- Koki Watanabe (渡邉 航貴; born 1999), Japanese badminton player
- Konomi Watanabe (渡邉 このみ; born 2006), Japanese actress and television personality
- Kōta Watanabe (footballer) (渡辺 皓太; born 1998), Japanese footballer
- Kota Watanabe (field hockey) (渡辺 晃大; born 1996), Japanese field hockey player
- Kozo Watanabe (disambiguation), multiple people
- Kumiko Watanabe (渡辺 久美子; born 1965), Japanese voice actress
- Kunitake Watanabe (渡辺 国武; 1846–1919), Japanese politician

=== L ===
- Lui Watanabe (渡部 累; born 1983), Japanese beauty pageant winner

=== M ===
- Makiko Watanabe (渡辺 真起子; born 1968), Japanese actress
- Makoto Watanabe (disambiguation), multiple people
- Makoto Sei Watanabe (born 1952), Japanese architect
- Mamoru Watanabe (渡辺 護; 1931–2013), Japanese film director, screenwriter and actor
- Mana Watanabe (渡部 愛; born 1993), Japanese shogi player
- Manami Watanabe (渡辺 愛未; born 1986), Japanese singer
- Marina Watanabe (渡辺 満里奈; born 1970), Japanese singer, actress and television personality
- Masakazu Watanabe (渡辺 正和; born 1986), Japanese shogi player
- Masaki Watanabe (1911–1995), Japanese orthopedic surgeon
- Masaki Watanabe (footballer) (渡邉 将基; born 1986), Japanese footballer
- Masako Watanabe (わたなべ まさこ; born 1929), Japanese manga artist
- Masanosuke Watanabe (渡辺 政之輔; 1899–1928), Japanese communist
- Masao Watanabe (渡辺 正夫; 1888–1950), Japanese general
- Masashi Watanabe (渡辺 正; 1936–1995), Japanese footballer and manager
- Masato Watanabe (渡辺 正人; born 1979), Japanese baseball player
- Masayoshi Watanabe (渡邉 正義; born 1954), Japanese chemist
- Matasaburō Watanabe (渡辺 又三郎; 1850–1910), Japanese politician
- Mayu Watanabe (渡辺 麻友; born 1994), Japanese singer, actress and idol
- Mayuko Watanabe (渡辺 真由子; born 1975), Japanese journalist and media scholar
- Mayumi Watanabe (渡辺 真弓; born 1983), Japanese sprinter
- Michiaki Watanabe (渡辺 宙明; 1925–2022), Japanese composer
- Michio Watanabe (渡辺 美智雄; 1923–1995), Japanese politician
- Miho Watanabe (渡邉 美穂; born 2000), Japanese musician and actress
- Miki Watanabe (渡邉 美樹; born 1959), Japanese businessman and politician
- Mina Watanabe (渡邉 美奈; born 1985), Japanese judoka
- Minayo Watanabe (渡辺 美奈代; born 1969), Japanese idol and singer
- Minoru Watanabe (渡辺 実; born 1962), Japanese actor
- Misa Watanabe (渡辺 美佐; born 1964), Japanese voice actress
- Misako Watanabe (渡辺 美佐子; born 1932), Japanese actress
- Misato Watanabe (渡辺 美里; born 1966), Japanese singer
- Mitsuki Watanabe (渡邉 三城; born 1987), Japanese footballer
- Mitsuteru Watanabe (渡辺 光輝; born 1974), Japanese footballer
- Miyuki Watanabe (渡辺 美優紀; born 1993), Japanese singer, actress and idol
- Morinari Watanabe (渡邊守成) born 1959, president of the International Gymnastics Federation
- Moritsuna Watanabe (渡辺 守綱; 1542–1620), Japanese samurai
- Mutsuhiro Watanabe (渡辺睦弘; 1918-2003), Japanese War Criminal

=== N ===
- Nao Watanabe (渡邊 奈央), Japanese singer
- Naoko Watanabe (disambiguation), multiple people
- Naomi Watanabe (渡辺 直美; born 1987), Japanese actress and comedian
- Naoto Watanabe (渡辺 直人; born 1980), Japanese baseball player
- Natsuhiko Watanabe (渡辺 夏彦; born 1995), Japanese footballer
- Natsuna Watanabe (渡辺 夏菜; born 1989), Japanese actress and model
- Noriko Watanabe (渡辺 典子; born 1965), Japanese actress
- Nozomi Watanabe (渡辺 心; born 1971), Japanese ice dancer

=== O ===
- On Watanabe (渡辺 温; 1902–1930), Japanese writer
- Osamu Watanabe (渡辺 長武; born 1940), Japanese sport wrestler

=== R ===
- Rika Watanabe (渡辺 梨加; born 1995), Japanese idol and model
- Risa Watanabe (渡邉 理佐; born 1998), Japanese idol and model
- Ryo Watanabe (disambiguation), multiple people
- Ryoko Watanabe (渡辺 良子; born 1961), Japanese pink film actress
- Ryoma Watanabe (渡邊 凌磨; born 1996), Japanese footballer
- Ryota Watanabe (渡辺 亮太; born 1991), Japanese footballer

=== S ===
- Sadao Watanabe (disambiguation), multiple people
- Sae Watanabe (渡辺 三重; born 1968), Japanese gymnast
- Satomi Watanabe (渡邉 聡美; born 1999), Japanese squash player
- Satosi Watanabe (渡辺 慧; 1910-1993), Japanese theoretical physicist
- Satoshi Watanabe (beach volleyball) (渡辺 聡; born 1975), Japanese beach volleyball player
- Shimon Watanabe (渡邉 志門; born 1990), Japanese footballer
- Shinichi Watanabe (渡邊 慎一; born 1964), Japanese anime director and voice actor
- Shinichirō Watanabe (渡辺 信一郎; born 1965), Japanese anime director, screenwriter and producer
- Shinzo Watanabe (渡辺 信三; born 1935), Japanese mathematician
- Shōichi Watanabe (渡部 昇一; 1930-2017), Japanese academic and writer
- Shōichi Watanabe (politician) (渡辺 省一; 1930–2000), Japanese politician
- Shōtei Watanabe (1851–1918), Japanese painter
- Shōzaburō Watanabe (渡辺 庄三郎; 1885–1962), Japanese printmaker
- Shu Watanabe (politician) (渡辺 周; born 1961), Japanese politician
- Shu Watanabe (actor) (渡部 秀; born 1991), Japanese actor
- Shunji Watanabe (born 1938), Japanese karateka
- Shunsuke Watanabe (渡辺 俊介; born 1976), Japanese baseball player
- Sogo Watanabe (渡辺 奏吾; born 1990), Japanese volleyball player
- Sota Watanabe (渡邊 創太; born 2000), Japanese footballer
- Sumiko Watanabe (渡辺 すみ子; 1916–2010), Japanese sprinter
- Sumio Watanabe (渡辺 澄夫; born 1959), Japanese engineer and mathematician
- Susumu Watanabe (渡邉 晋; born 1973), Japanese footballer and manager
- Sylvia Watanabe, American writer

=== T ===
- Tadao Watanabe (渡辺 忠雄; 1898-1980), Japanese politician
- Tadashi Watanabe (渡辺 貞; born 1944), Japanese computer engineer
- Taeko Watanabe (渡辺 多恵子; born 1960), Japanese manga artist
- Takaaki Watanabe (渡辺 高章; born 1987), Japanese professional wrestler best known as Evil
- Takahiro Watanabe (渡辺 高博; born 1970), Japanese sprinter
- Takamasa Watanabe (渡辺 隆正; born 1977), Japanese footballer
- Takao Watanabe (渡辺 孝男; born 1950), Japanese politician
- Takashi Watanabe (渡部 高志; born 1957), Japanese anime director
- Takehiro Watanabe (skier) (渡部 剛弘; born 1993), Japanese Nordic combined skier
- Takehiro Watanabe (table tennis) (渡辺 武弘; born 1961), Japanese table tennis player
- Takeo Watanabe (渡辺 岳夫; 1933–1989), Japanese musician and composer
- Takeshi Watanabe (disambiguation), multiple people
- Taku Watanabe (渡辺 卓; born 1971), Japanese footballer
- Takumi Watanabe (渡辺 匠; born 1982), Japanese footballer
- Tamae Watanabe (渡辺 玉枝; born 1938), Japanese mountain climber
- Tatsuo Watanabe (渡部 龍雄; 1928–2001), Japanese ski jumper
- Tatsuya Watanabe (渡邊 達哉; born 1991), Japanese badminton player
- Terrance Watanabe (born 1957), American businessman and high roller
- Tetsu Watanabe (渡辺 哲; born 1950), Japanese actor
- Tokutarō Watanabe, Japanese businessman
- Tomoyoshi Watanabe (渡辺 具能; born 1941), Japanese politician
- Toshiyuki Watanabe (渡辺 俊幸; born 1955), Japanese musician and composer
- Tsukasa Watanabe (渡辺 司; born 1957), Japanese golfer
- Watanabe no Tsuna (渡邊 綱; 953–1025), Japanese samurai
- Tsuneo Watanabe (渡邉 恒雄; 1926–2024), Japanese businessman
- Tsurugi Watanabe (渡邉 剣; born 1996), Japanese actor and television personality
- Tsuyoshi Watanabe (渡辺 剛; born 1997), Japanese footballer

=== Y ===
- Yanosuke Watanabe (渡邊 彌之助), Japanese footballer
- Yasuo Watanabe (渡辺 保夫; born 1944), Japanese sport wrestler
- Yasushi Watanabe (渡辺 靖; born 1967), Japanese anthropologist
- Yoko Watanabe (渡辺 葉子; 1953–2004), Japanese opera singer
- Yoshiaki Watanabe (渡辺 好明; 1955–2009), Japanese artist
- Yoshiichi Watanabe (渡辺 由一; born 1954), Japanese footballer
- Yoshiko Watanabe (渡辺 佳子), Japanese manga artist, illustrator and animator
- Yoshimi Watanabe (渡辺 喜美; born 1952), Japanese politician
- Yoshinori Watanabe (渡辺 芳則; 1941–2012), alleged yakuza
- Yoshio Watanabe (渡辺 義雄; 1907–2000), Japanese photographer
- Yoshitaka Watanabe (渡辺 佳孝; born 1973), Japanese footballer
- Yuga Watanabe (渡辺 悠雅; born 1996), Japanese footballer
- Yui Watanabe (渡部 優衣; born 1988), Japanese voice actress, actress and singer
- Yuichi Watanabe, Japanese mixed martial artist
- Yukari Watanabe (渡邊 ゆかり; born 1981), Japanese speed skater
- Yukiyoshi Watanabe (渡邉 幸義), Japanese businessman and writer
- Yumi Watanabe (渡邊 由美; born 1970), Japanese women's footballer
- Yuta Watanabe (渡邊 雄太; born 1994), Japanese basketball player
- Yuta Watanabe (渡辺 勇大; born 1997), Japanese badminton player
- Zenjiro Watanabe (渡辺 善次郎; 1914–?), Japanese figure skater

== Fictional characters ==
- Akari Watanabe, the female protagonist from More Than a Married Couple, But Not Lovers
- Cameron Watanabe, the Green Samurai Ranger from Power Rangers Ninja Storm
- Eva Watanabe, a character that dies in Friday the 13th Part VIII: Jason Takes Manhattan
- Kanako Watanabe (ワタナベ・カナコ), a character in the anime series Star Driver
- Kanji Watanabe, the central character in Akira Kurosawa's 1952 film Ikiru
- Mari Watanabe (渡辺 摩利), a character in the light novel series The Irregular at Magic High School
- Kimi Watanabe Finster, Chuckie's stepsister from Rugrats
- Mia Watanabe, the Pink Ranger from Power Rangers Samurai
- Osamu Watanabe (渡邊 オサム), a character in the manga series The Prince of Tennis
- Sayaka Watanabe (渡辺 彩花), a character in the manga series The Kawai Complex Guide to Manors and Hostel Behavior
- Terry Watanabe, a character from Power Rangers Samurai
- Toru Watanabe, the protagonist of Haruki Murakami's 1987 novel Norwegian Wood
- You Watanabe (渡辺 曜), a character in the media franchise Love Live! Sunshine!!
- Ryo Watanabe (リョウ ワタナベ), the boss character in the 2007 racing game Need for Speed: ProStreet

== See also ==
- List of common Japanese surnames
- Watanabe Tekkōjo, steel foundry, renamed in 1943 to Kyūshū Heiki (Kyūshū Armaments), dissolved in 2001
- Watanabe Instruments, later Graphtec Corporation
- The Watanabes, hit group of Tokyo-based international Indie/acoustic band
