= Jun Watanabe =

Jun Watanabe may refer to:

- Jun Watanabe (architect) (born 1954), Japanese architect and former professor at Chubu University
- Jun Watanabe (actor) (born 1982), Japanese stunt performer and suit actor

== See also ==
- Jin Watanabe (disambiguation)
- Watanabe, the fifth most common Japanese surname
