= Natsuhiko =

- Gender: Male

Origin
- Origin: Japanese
- Meaning: Different meanings depending on the kanji used

Natsuhiko (written: 夏彦) is a masculine Japanese given name. Notable people with the name include:

- Natsuhiko Kyogoku (京極 夏彦; born 1963), Japanese writer
- Natsuhiko Watanabe (渡辺 夏彦; born 1995), Japanese footballer

== Fictional characters ==
- Natsuhiko Taki (瀧 夏彦), a character in the manga series Eyeshield 21
