= Makoto Watanabe =

Makoto Watanabe may refer to:

- Makoto Watanabe (diplomat) (渡邉允), Grand Chamberlain of Japan in 1996, Chief of Protocol of Ministry of Foreign Affairs
- Makoto Watanabe, pilot of Japan Airlines Flight 907, involved in the 2001 Japan Airlines mid-air incident
- Makoto Watanabe (artist), featured in Tokyoten
- Makoto Shin Watanabe (渡辺真理) (1950-), architect, visiting professor at
- Makoto Sei Watanabe (渡辺誠) (1952-), architect based in Tokyo
- Makoto Watanabe (chef) (渡辺誠) (1948-2003), French cuisine chef who worked for Imperial Household Agency
- Makoto Watanabe (footballer) (1980-), footballer
- Makoto Watanabe, Japanese journalist, founder of Tokyo Investigative Newsroom Tansa
