= Hajime Watanabe =

Hajime Watanabe may refer to:

- Hajime Watanabe (animator) (born 1957), animator
- Watanabe Hajime (samurai), samurai of Feudal Japan
