= Daigo Watanabe =

Japanese footballer (born 1984)

Daigo Watanabe 渡邉 大剛
Personal information
- Full name: Daigo Watanabe
- Date of birth: 3 December 1984 (age 41)
- Place of birth: Unzen, Nagasaki, Japan
- Height: 1.71 m (5 ft 7 1/2 in)
- Position: Midfielder

Youth career
- 2000–2002: Kunimi High School

Senior career*
Years	Team	Apps	(Gls)
2001–2010	Kyoto Sanga FC	169	(9)
2011–2015	Omiya Ardija	148	(12)
2016	Busan IPark	5	(0)
2016–2018	Kamatamare Sanuki	80	(3)
2019–	Shinagawa CC Yokohama		
Total		402	(24)
- * Club domestic league appearances and goals

Daigo Watanabe (渡邉 大剛, Watanabe Daigō; born 3 December 1984) is a Japanese footballer who plays as a midfielder. His younger brothers Kazuma Watanabe and Mitsuki Watanabe are also footballers.

== Career ==
Watanabe left Kamatamare Sanuki at the end of 2018, where his contract expired.

== Club statistics ==
Updated as of 23 February 2019.

Club performance			League		Cup		League Cup		Total	
Season	Club	League	Apps	Goals	Apps	Goals	Apps	Goals	Apps	Goals
Japan			League		Emperor's Cup		J.League Cup		Total	
2003	Kyoto Sanga FC	J1 League	0	0	0	0	0	0	0	0
2004	Kyoto Sanga FC	J2 League	18	0	0	0	-		18	0
2005	Kyoto Sanga FC	J2 League	4	0	1	0	-		5	0
2006	Kyoto Sanga FC	J1 League	18	0	1	0	5	1	24	1
2007	Kyoto Sanga FC	J2 League	47	3	1	0	-		48	3
2008	Kyoto Sanga FC	J1 League	34	3	2	0	5	1	41	4
2009	Kyoto Sanga FC	J1 League	20	2	0	0	6	0	26	2
2010	Kyoto Sanga FC	J1 League	28	1	2	0	5	0	35	1
2011	Omiya Ardija	J1 League	23	1	1	0	2	0	26	0
2012	Omiya Ardija	J1 League	31	3	4	0	5	1	40	4
2013	Omiya Ardija	J1 League	33	5	2	0	4	0	39	5
2014	Omiya Ardija	J1 League	27	1	3	0	5	0	35	1
2015	Omiya Ardija	J2 League	34	2	1	1	-		35	3
2016	Busan IPark	KL Challenge	5	0	0	0	0	0	5	0
2016	Kamatamare Sanuki	J2 League	19	1	1	1	-		20	2
2017	Kamatamare Sanuki	J2 League	38	2	0	0	-		38	2
2018	Kamatamare Sanuki	J2 League	23	0	0	0	-		23	0
Career total			402	24	22	2	37	3	461	29
