= Hakata Domain =

Hakata Domain 伯太藩
- under Tokugawa shogunate Japan
- 1661–1871
- Capital: Hakata jin'ya
- Area
  - Coordinates: 34°27′31.74″N 135°22′14.81″E
  - Type: Daimyō
- Historical era: Edo period
  - Established: 1661
  - Nomoto Domain: 1661
  - Obadera Domain: 1698
  - Hakata Domain: 1727
  - Disestablished: 1871
- Today part of: part of Osaka Prefecture

Location of Hakata jin'ya
Hakata Domain (Japan)

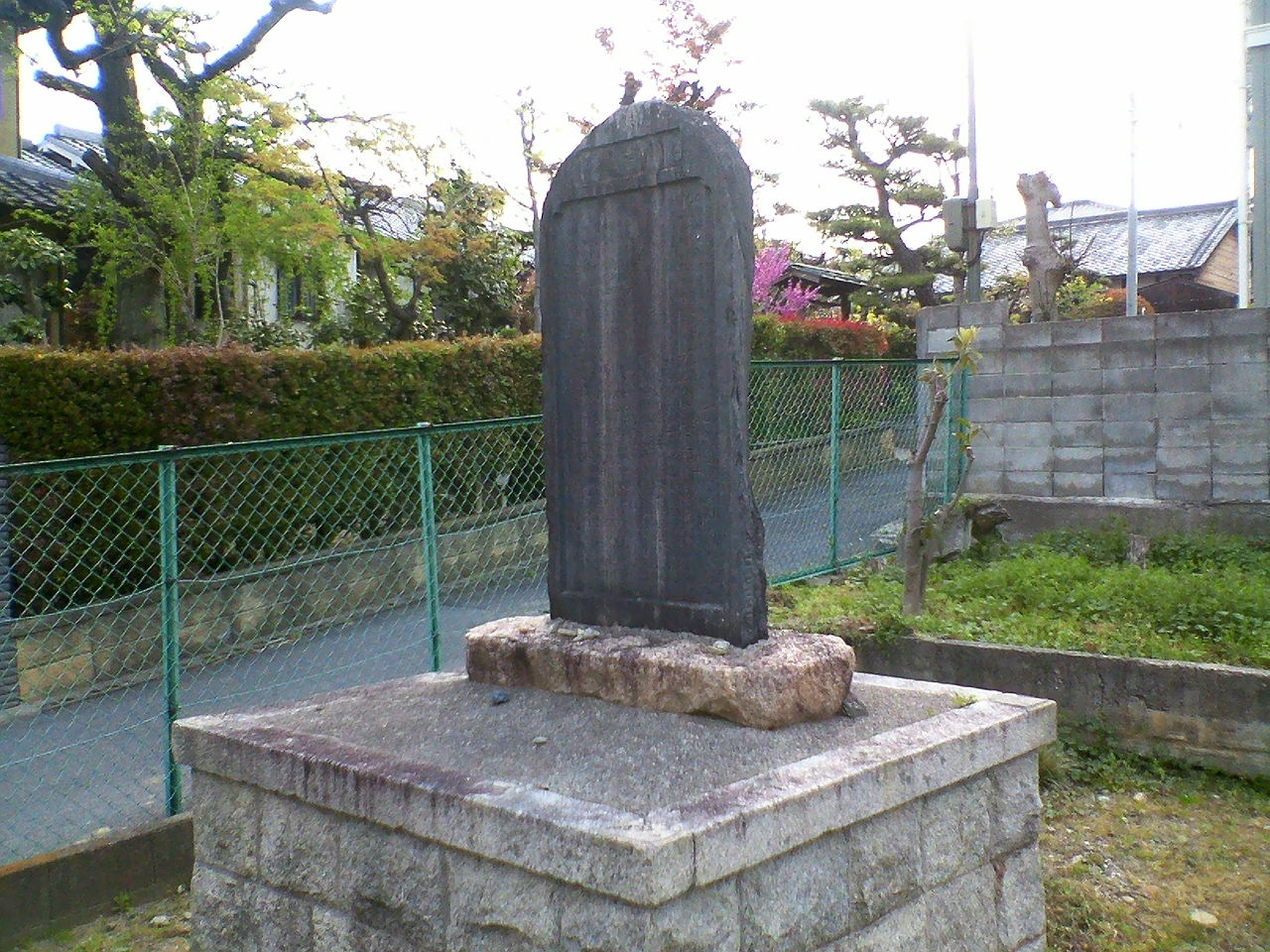
Monument marking the site of the Hakata jin'ya

Hakata Domain (伯太藩, Hakata-han) was a feudal domain under the Tokugawa shogunate of Edo period Japan, located in Izumi Province in what is now the southern portion of modern-day Osaka Prefecture. It was centered around the Hakata jin'ya which was located in what is now the city of Izumi and was controlled by the fudai daimyō Watanabe clan throughout all of its history.

== History ==
Watanabe Yoshitsune (1611-1668) was the fifth son of Watanabe Shigetsuna, one of Tokugawa Ieyasu's generals. Starting as a 3250 koku hatamoto in 1611, he serving in numerous posts within the administration of the Tokugawa shogunate, and by 1661 had amassed fiefs with an additional kokudaka 10,000 koku, mostly in Kawachi and Izumi Provinces, which elevated him to the ranks of the daimyō. He established his seat at his original holding at Nomoto in Hiki District, Musashi Province, so the domain was initially styled Nomoto Domain (野本藩, Nomoto-han). His son, Watanabe Masatsuna had no direct heir, and the third daimyō Watanabe Mototsuna was adopted from the main branch of the family.

In 1698, Watanabe Mototsuna relocated his seat from Musashi to Izumi Province to better administrate the bulk of his holdings, and established a new jin'ya in what is now Minami-ku, Sakai. The domain was renamed Obadera Domain (大庭寺藩, Obadera-han) after this new location. However, in 1727, Watanabe Mototsuna decided to relocate once again. The jin'ya was moved to a location within what is now the city of Izumi, and the domain was renamed Hakata Domain. His successors would remain at the location until the Meiji restoration. During the Boshin War the domain sided with the new Meiji government. In 1871, the domain became Hakata Prefecture with the abolition of the han system, and subsequently was merged into Sakai Prefecture and then Osaka Prefecture.

The final daimyō of Hakata, Watanabe Akitsuna received the kazoku peerage title of Viscount in 1884.

== Holdings at the end of the Edo period ==
As with most domains in the han system, Hakata Domain consisted of several discontinuous territories calculated to provide the assigned kokudaka, based on periodic cadastral surveys and projected agricultural yields.

- Izumi Province
  - 12 villages in Ōtori District
  - 4 villages in Izumi District
- Kawachi Province
  - 5 villages in Furuichi District
  - 5 villages in Shiki District
  - 2 villages in Tanboku District
- Ōmi Province
  - 1 village in Kurita District
  - 2 villages in Yasu District
  - 2 villages in Gamo District
  - 6 villages in Takashima District

== List of daimyō ==
#	Name	Tenure	Courtesy title	Court Rank	kokudaka	Location
Watanabe clan, 1661-1871 (Fudai)
1	Watanabe Yoshitsuna (渡辺吉綱)	1661 - 1668	Tango-no-kami (丹後守)	Junior 5th Rank, Lower Grade (従五位下)	13,500 koku	Nomoto Domain
2	Watanabe Masatsuna (渡辺方綱)	1668 - 1680	Etchu-no-kami (越中守)	Junior 5th Rank, Lower Grade (従五位下)	13,500 koku	Nomoto Domain
3	Watanabe Mototsuna (渡辺基綱)	1698 - 1698	Bitchu-no-kami (備中守)	Junior 5th Rank, Lower Grade (従五位下)	13,500 koku	Obadera Domain
1	Watanabe Mototsuna (渡辺基綱)	1698 - 1727	Bitchu-no-kami (備中守)	Junior 5th Rank, Lower Grade (従五位下)	13,500 koku	Nomoto Domain
1	Watanabe Mototsuna (渡辺基綱)	1727 - 1728	Bitchu-no-kami (備中守)	Junior 5th Rank, Lower Grade (従五位下)	13,500 koku	Hakata Domain
2	Watanabe Noritsuna (渡辺登綱)	1728 - 1767	Etchu-no-kami (越中守)	Junior 5th Rank, Lower Grade (従五位下)	13,500 koku	Hakata Domain
3	Watanabe Nobutsuna (渡辺信綱)	1767 - 1772	Buzen-no-kami (豊前守)	Junior 5th Rank, Lower Grade (従五位下)	13,500 koku	Hakata Domain
4	Watanabe Koretsuna (渡辺伊綱)	1772 - 1783	Tango-no-kami (丹後守)	Junior 5th Rank, Lower Grade (従五位下)	13,500 koku	Hakata Domain
5	Watanabe Hidetsuna (渡辺豪綱)	1783 - 1793	Suruga-no-kami (駿河守)	Junior 5th Rank, Lower Grade (従五位下)	13,500 koku	Hakata Domain
6	Watanabe Harutsuna (渡辺春綱)	1793 - 1810	Daigaku-no-kami (大学頭)	Junior 5th Rank, Lower Grade (従五位下)	13,500 koku	Hakata Domain
7	Watanabe Noritsuna (渡辺則綱)	1810 - 1828	Etchu-no-kami (越中守)	Junior 5th Rank, Lower Grade (従五位下)	13,500 koku	Hakata Domain
8	Watanabe Kiyotsuna (渡辺潔綱)	1828 - 1847	Tango-no-kami (丹後守)	Junior 5th Rank, Lower Grade (従五位下)	13,500 koku	Hakata Domain
9	Watanabe Akitsuna (渡辺章綱)	1847 - 1871	Tango-no-kami (丹後守)	4th Rank (正四位)	13,500 koku	Hakata Domain

== See also ==
- List of Han
- Abolition of the han system
