= Jin Watanabe =

Jin Watanabe may refer to:

- Jin Watanabe (architect) (1887 – 1973), Japanese architect
- Jin Watanabe (handballer) (born 1990), Japanese handball player
