= Sadao Watanabe =

Sadao Watanabe may refer to:

- Sadao Watanabe (artist) (1913–1996), Japanese Christian stencil artist
- Sadao Watanabe (musician), Japanese jazz saxophonist
