= Naoko Watanabe =

Naoko Watanabe may refer to:

- Naoko Watanabe (actress) (born 1984), Japanese actress who appeared in Silk
- Naoko Watanabe (voice actress) (born 1959), Japanese voice actress known for her work in the Dragon Ball series
