= Tokyoten =

Tokyoten (東京展, Tōkyōten) is an annual fine arts festival in Tokyo, Japan which has been running since 1975.

== Showing artists ==
The festival has hosted works by many artists, including the following.

- Mayumi Aoki
- Junko Arima
- Yasunori Asakawa
- Masahiro Hosoyamada
- Aiko Kurihara
- Teruaki Miura
- Reiko Hashimoto
- Tesshin Saitō
- Junpei Satoh
- Setsuko Suzuki
- Hiroyuki Uchida (ja)
- Makoto Watanabe
