= Ryo Watanabe =

Ryo Watanabe may refer to:

- Ryo Watanabe (pitcher) (渡辺 亮, born 1982), Japanese baseball player
- Ryo Watanabe (infielder) (渡邉 諒, born 1995), Japanese baseball player
- Ryo Watanabe (footballer, born September 1996) (渡邊 龍, born 1996), Japanese football player
- Ryo Watanabe (footballer, born October 1996) (渡邉 りょう, born 1996), Japanese football player
