= Tokyo Investigative Newsroom Tansa =

Japanese investigative journalism NGO

Tansa
- Type: Nonprofit
- Founder: Makoto Watanabe
- Editor-in-chief: Makoto Watanabe
- Staff writers: 5
- Founded: 2017
- Language: Japanese, English
- Headquarters: Tokyo, Japan

Tokyo Investigative Newsroom Tansa is the first Japanese investigative journalism nonprofit organization and a member of the Global Investigative Journalism Network. It is funded by donations and private grants.

== Founding ==
Tansa was founded in 2017 as the Waseda Chronicle, part of the Waseda University Institute for Journalism, and became independent of the university in 2018. In 2021, it assumed its current name.

Its founder, Makoto Watanabe, was previously an investigative reporter with Japan's leading newspaper, The Asahi Shimbun. Watanabe quit The Asahi Shimbun after it retracted a major scoop related to the Fukushima nuclear accident, and greatly reduced its investigative journalism unit. Watanabe founded the Waseda Chronicle in order to "make a new media that wouldn’t fold" under business or political pressure.

== Early years ==
Starting in 2018, Tansa published a series of reports that exposed decades-long forced sterilizations of mentally disabled people, causing the government to apologize and provide compensation. Tansa has also published extensively on topics such as chemical pollution by a major manufacturer or a suicide caused by bullying at a high school. The public broadcaster, NHK, uses some of Tansa's content.

In 2024, Tansa co-founded the Asian Dispatch, a consortium of investigative newsrooms from ten countries across Asia.
