= Takeshi Watanabe =

Takeshi Watanabe may refer to:

- Takeshi Watanabe (civil servant) (1906–2010), first president of the Asian Development Bank
- Takeshi Watanabe (footballer) (born 1972), a Japanese football player
