= Jun Watanabe (architect) =

Japanese architect

Jun Watanabe (渡辺 純, Watanabe Jun; born 20 July 1954, in Tokyo) is a Japanese architect and a former professor at Chubu University (until 2009).

After studying at the University of Tokyo, Jun finished the master's degree of Architecture in Urban Design from Harvard University in 1983. His work experiences include Kenzo Tange & URTEC (1978–81), I.M.Pei & Partners (1983–85), and Maki and Associates (1985–90). After completing the award-winning Makuhari Messe as a project architect with Maki & Associates, he was appointed as an assistant professor of architecture at the University of Texas at Austin in 1990, where he received the tenure professorship in 1996. He moved to Chubu University as a professor in 1996, and was honorably appointed as a visiting professor at Chinese University of Hong Kong in 2014. He founded Jun Watanabe & Associates in 1990. He received 2 local AIA Awards in 1993 and 1995 in Austin. In 2003 he received the gold medal, Residential/ Interior category of Bienal Miami + Beach 2003, with his work of Villa Gamagori. In 2011 he received the Good Design Award, with his work of Hiroo Flat. In 2012,2014,2015,2016,2017,2018,2020 & 2021, the received the Good Design Awards, as well.

== Works ==
- Parents House in Chofu (1995)
- House in Kibi (1999)
- Villa Gamagori (1992)
- Chubu University Foreign Student Dormitory (2003)
- Villa Nakakaruizawa (2004)
- Orphant House‘Aster’(2005)
- Nakameguro 2-chome Condominium (2006)
- Oobu Flat (2007)
- Ogikubo Flat (2008)
- Hiroo Flat (2009)
- House in Seijo (2009)
- Michino-eki Tomika (2010)
- Condominium in Takatsu (2010)
- Renovation of the International Conference Center of Makuhari Messe

== Gallery ==
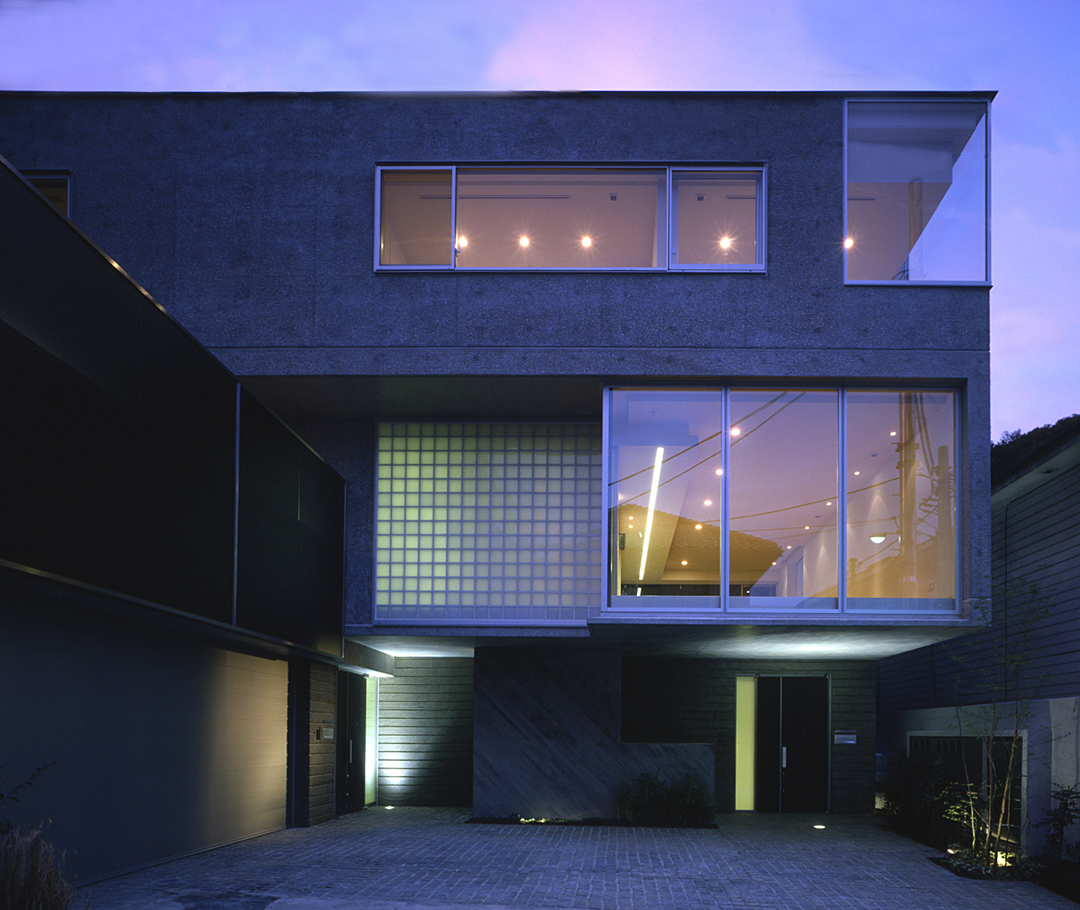
Hiroo Flat/Tokyo, Japan

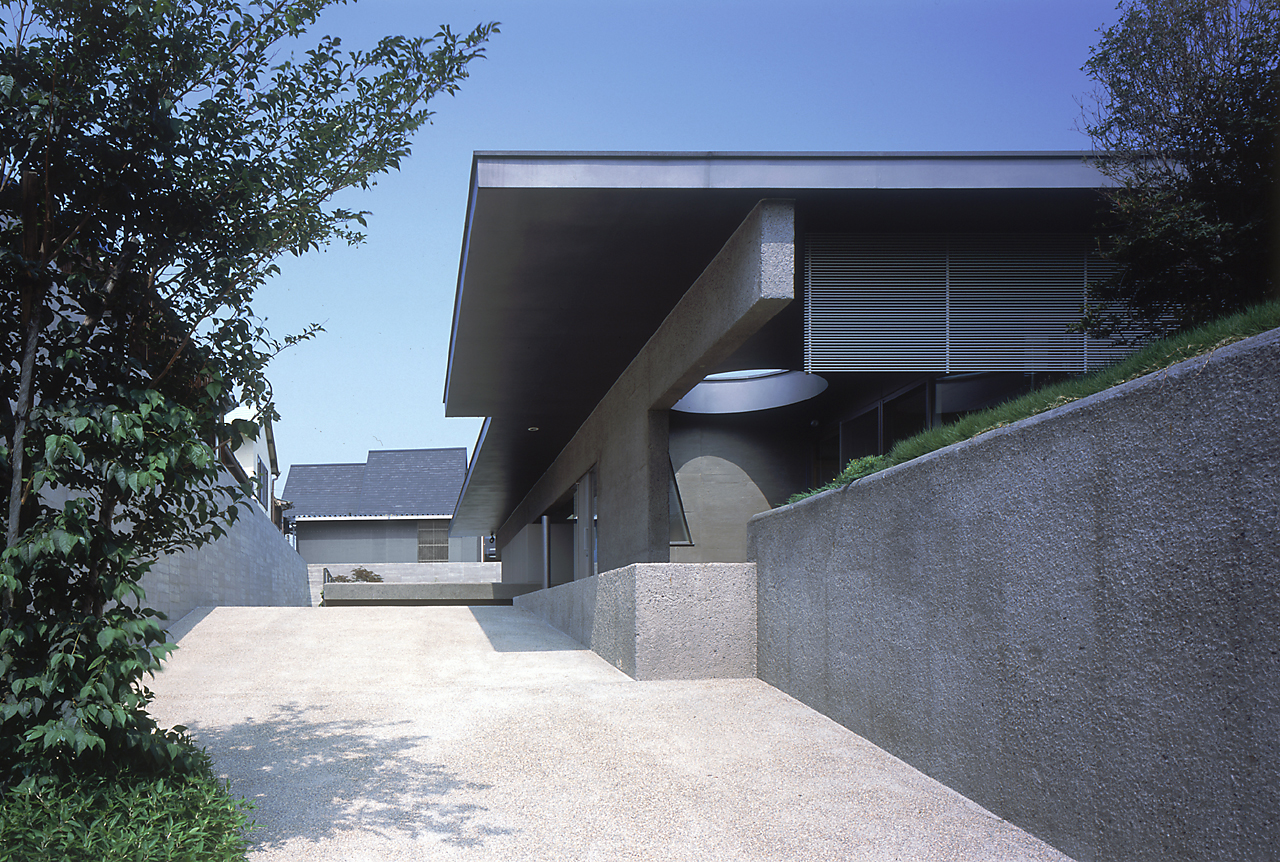
Villa Gamagori/Aichi, Japan

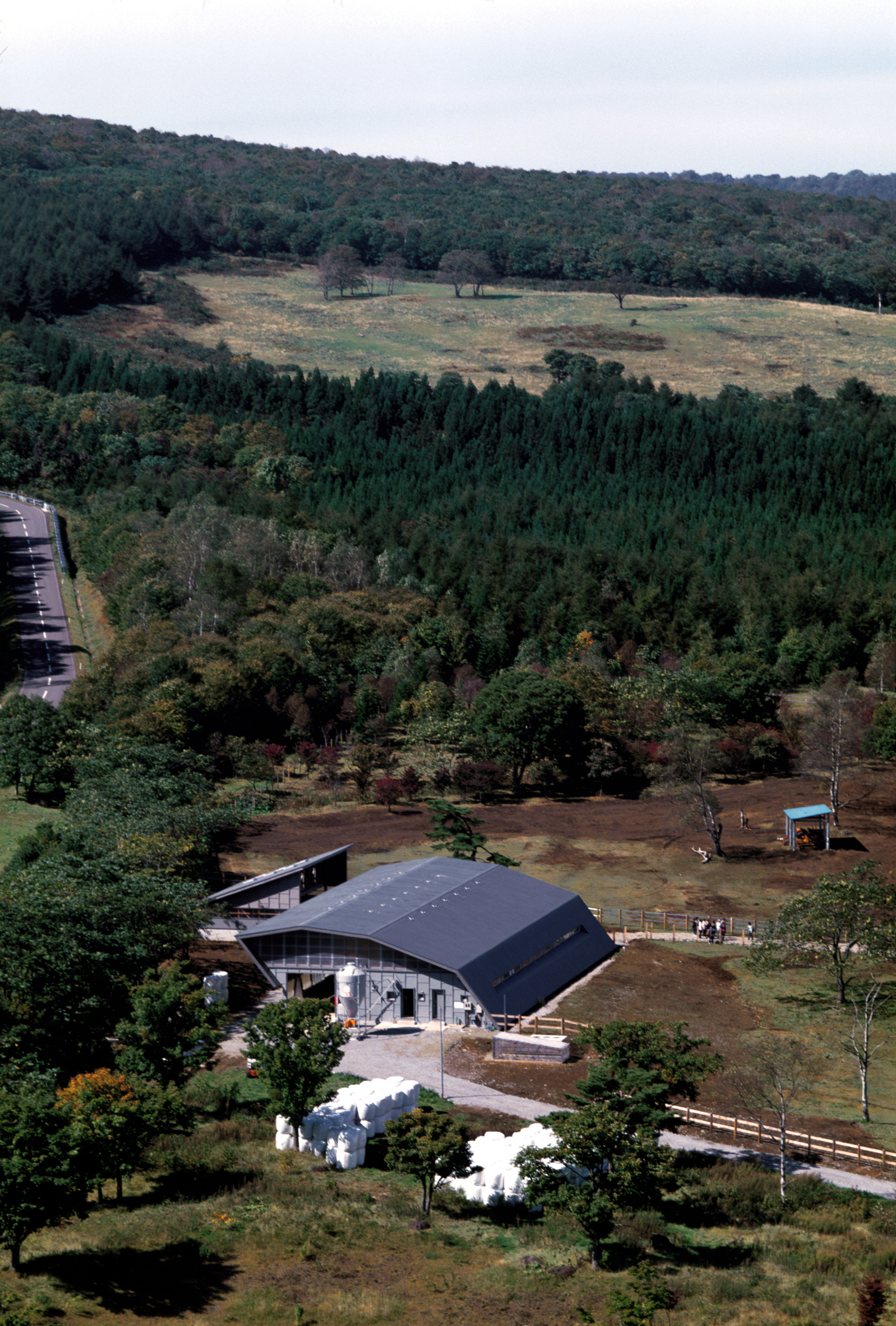
Cow barn in Appi/Iwate, Japan

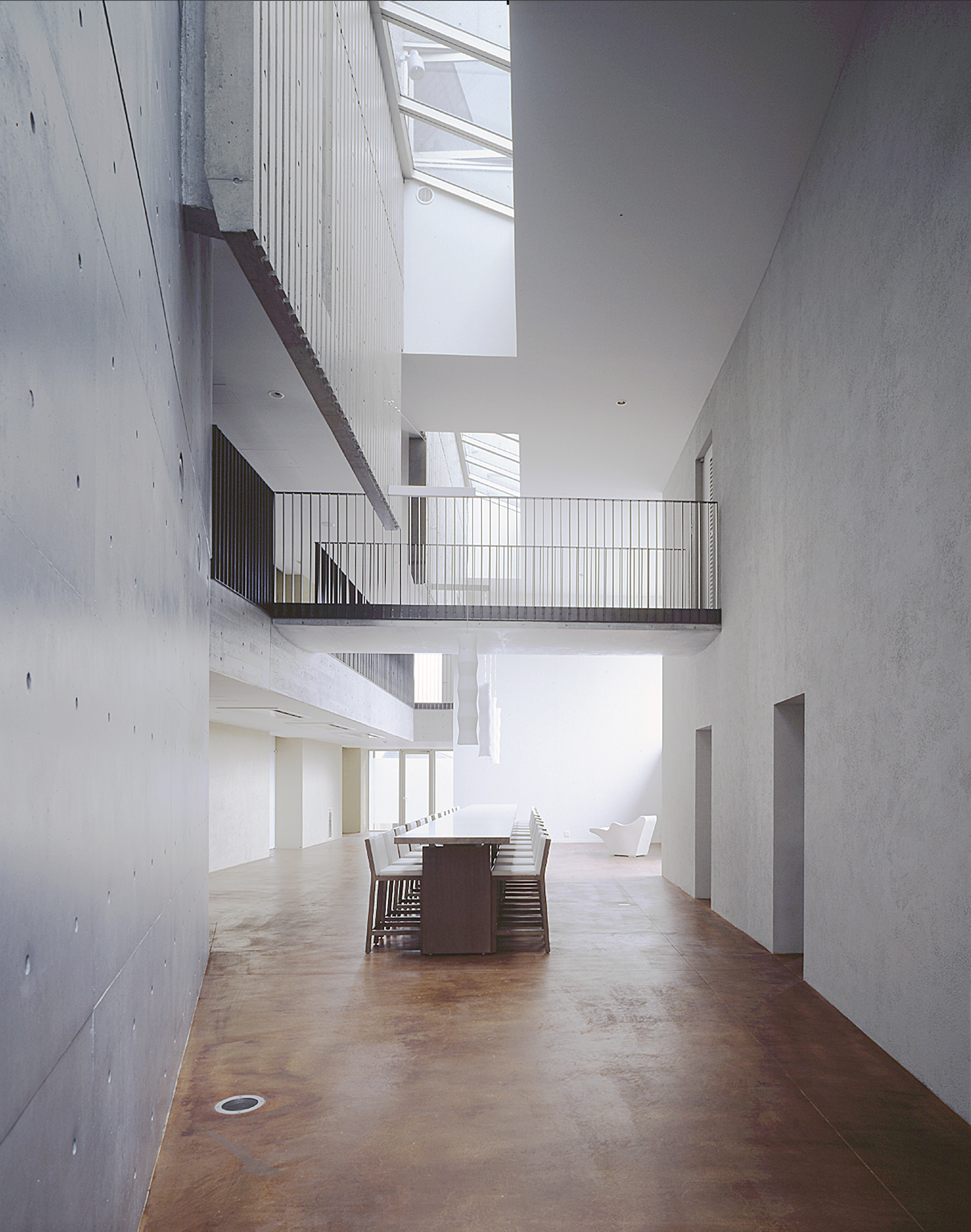
Foreign Student Dormitory, Chubu University/Aichi, Japan

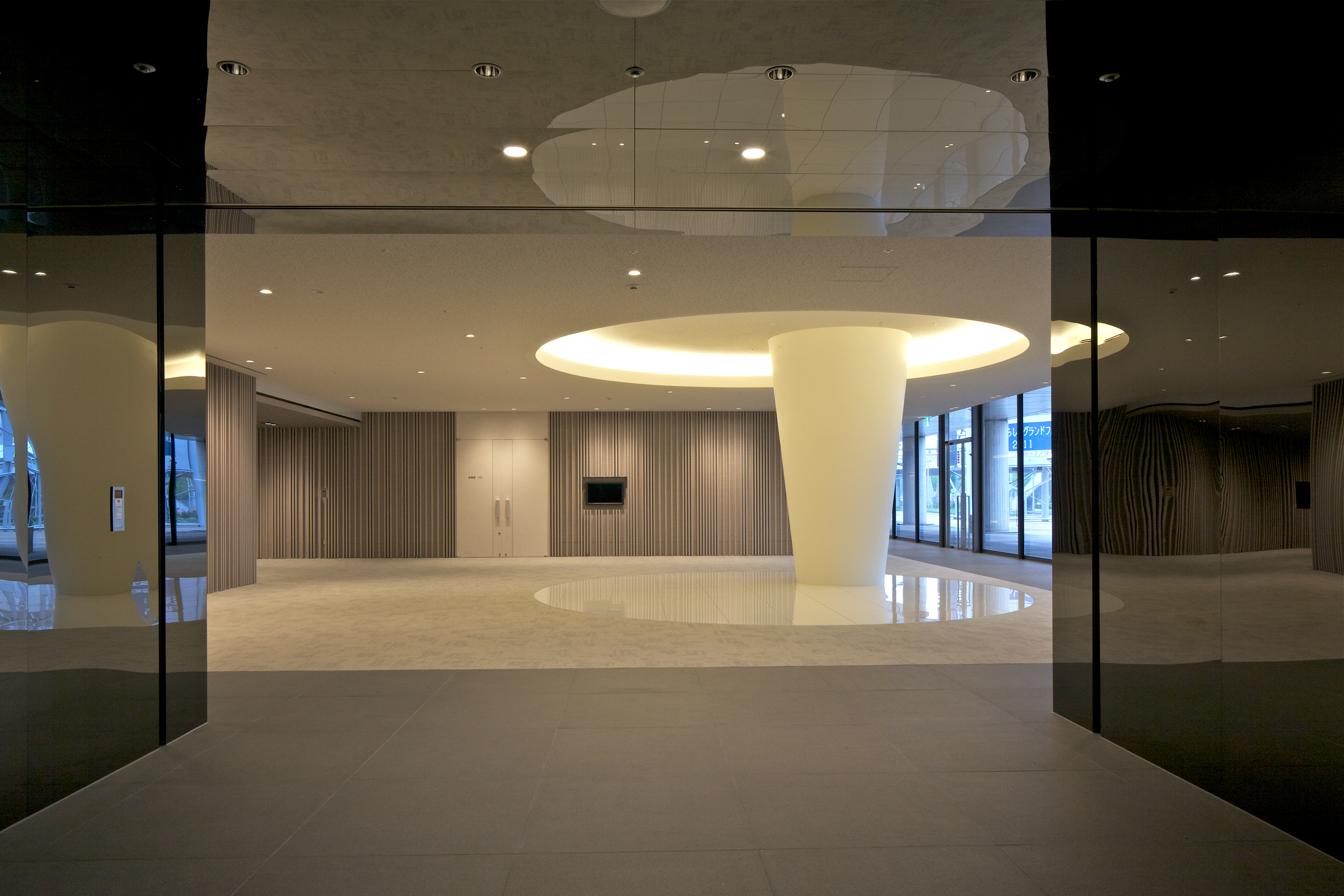
Renovation of the International Congress Hall/Chiba, Japan

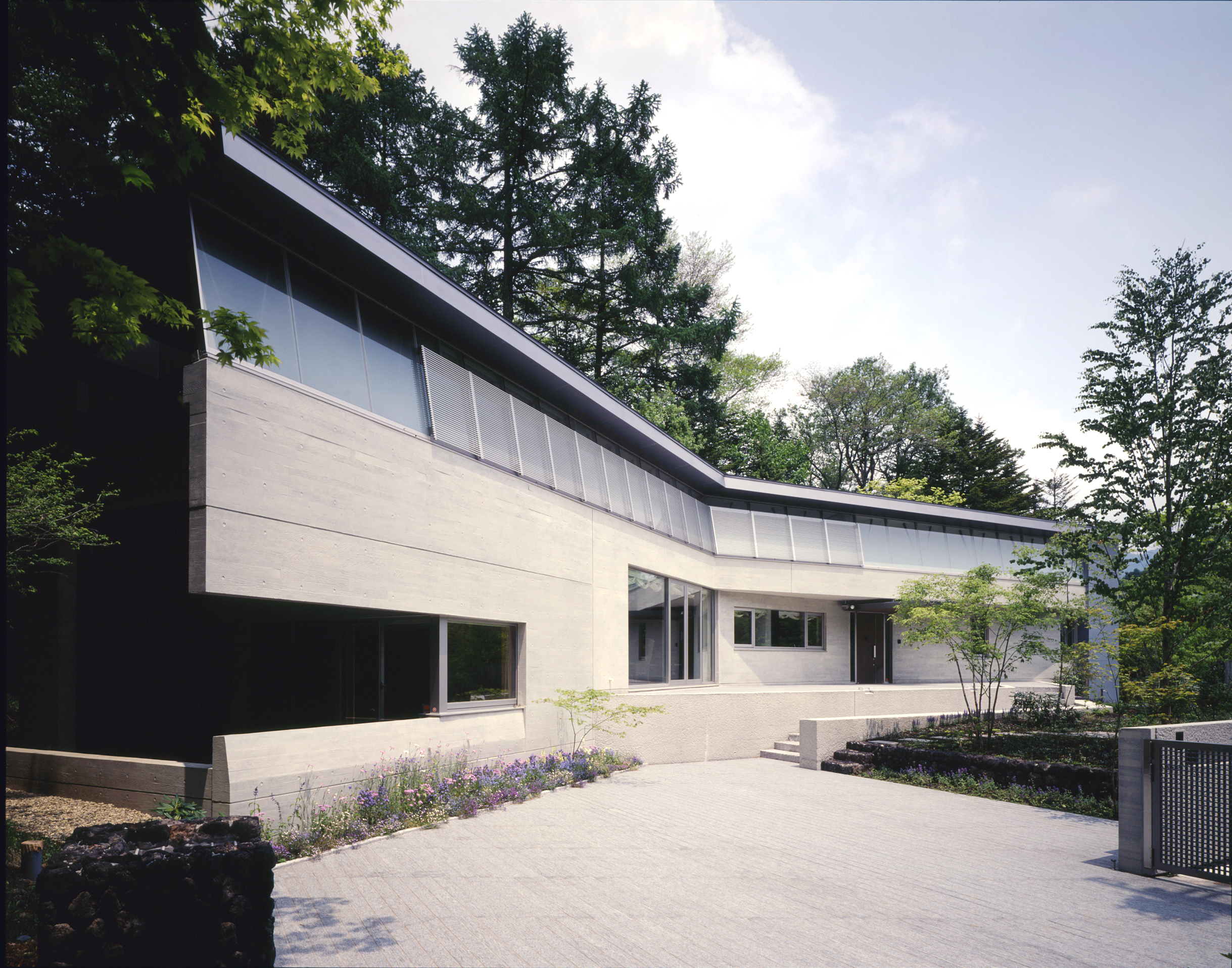
Villa Nakakaruizawa/Karuizawa, Japan

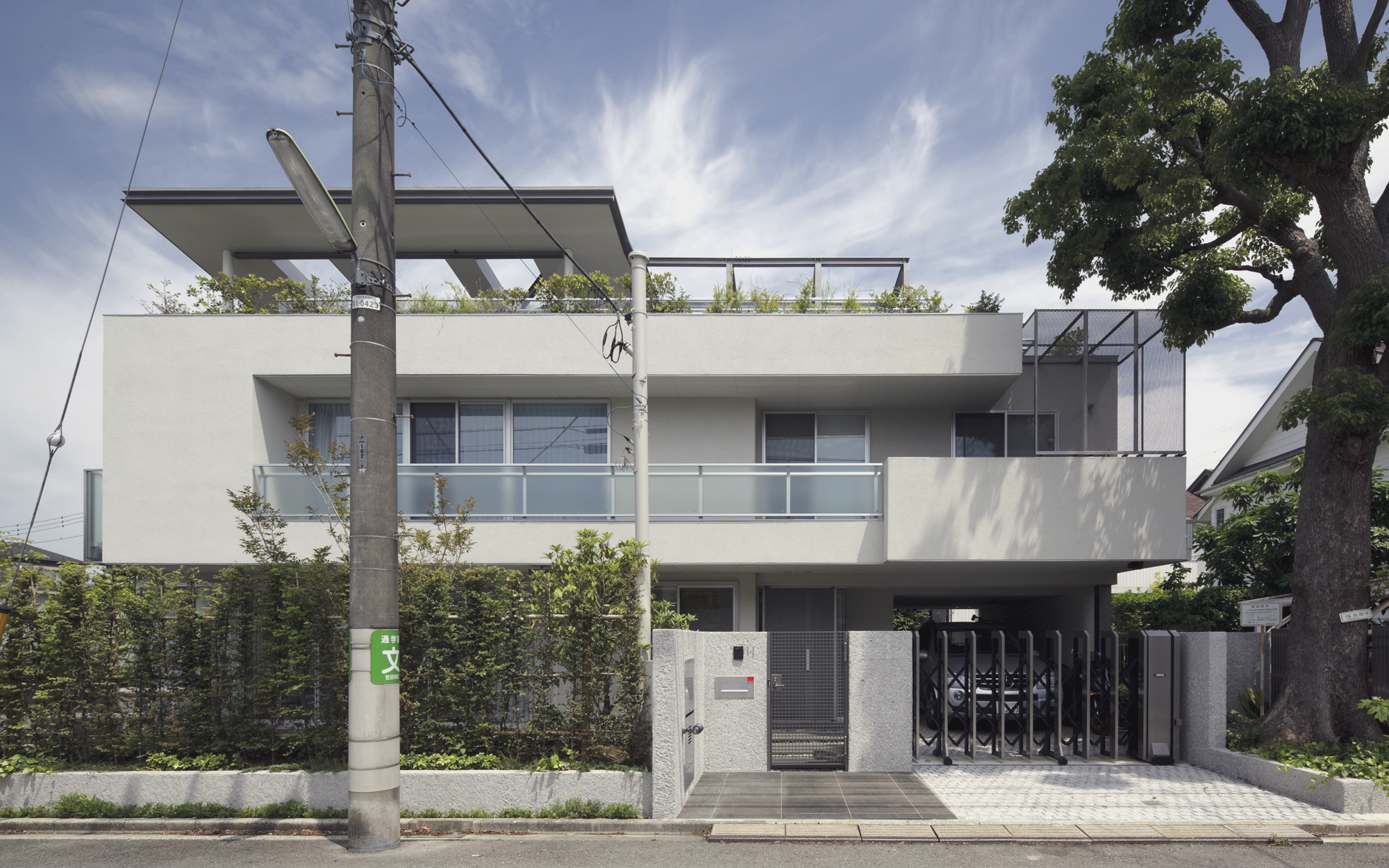
House in Seijo/Tokyo, Japan

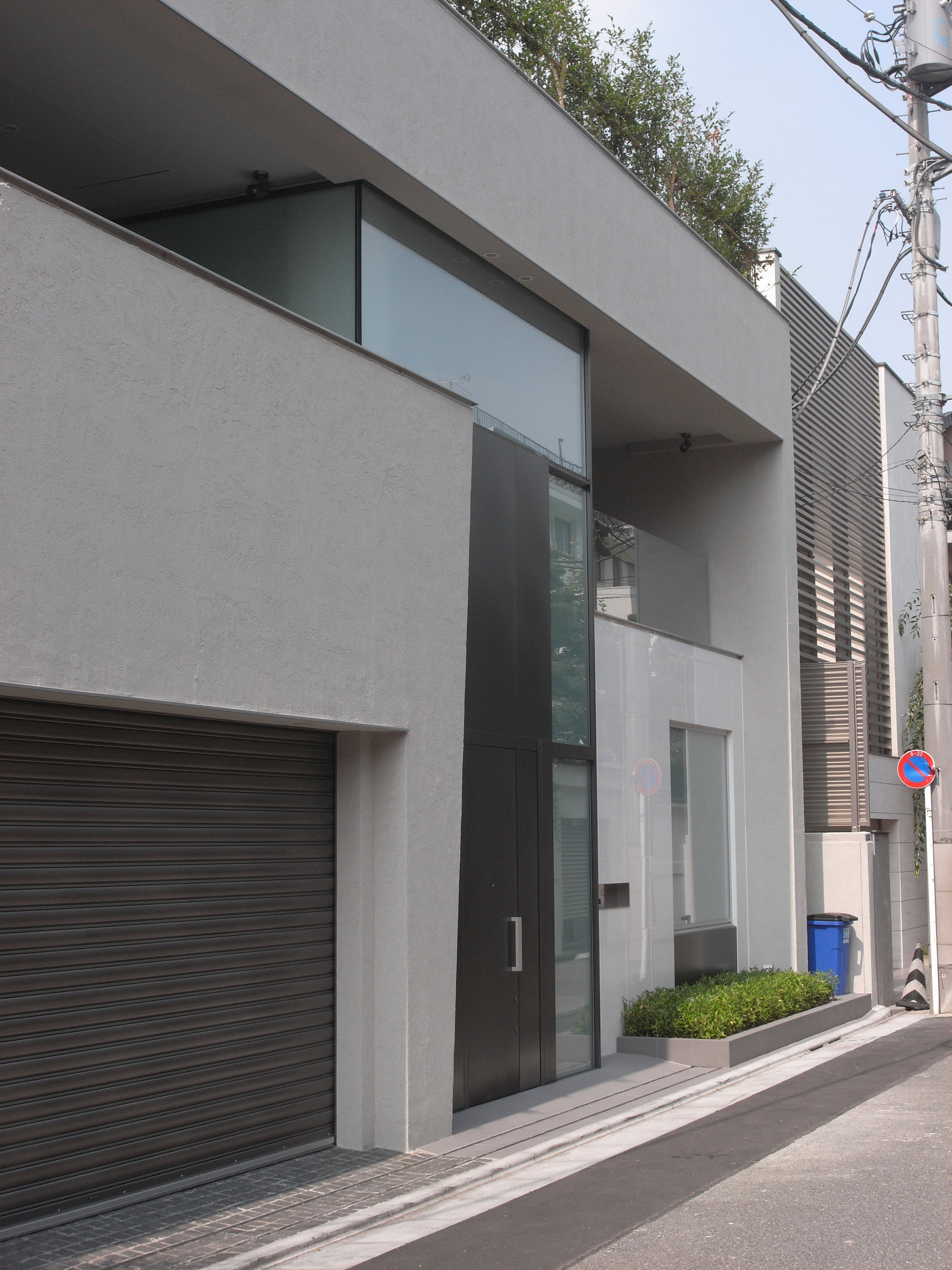
House in Shimazuyama/Tokyo, Japan

== Awards ==
- 1993 Citation of Honor, American Institute of Architects Austin Chapter
- 1995 Design Merit, American Institute of Architects Austin Chapter
- 2001 Selected Work (Design Award), Architectural Institute of Japan
- 2002 Selected Work (Design Award), Architectural Institute of Japan
- 2003 Gold Medal, Miami+Beach Bienale Residential Category
- 2005 Selected Work (Design Award), Japan Institute of Architect
- 2006 Selected Work (Design Award), Japan Institute of Architect
- 2010 Selected Work (Design Award), Japan Institute of Architect
- 2011 Good Design Award, Japan Institute of Design Promotion
- 2012 Good Design Award, Japan Institute of Design Promotion
- 2014 ARCASIA Award Industrial Building Category
- 2014 Good Design Award, Japan Institute of Design Promotion
- 2014 Visiting Professor, Chinese University of Hong Kong
- 2015 Good Design Award, Japan Institute of Design Promotion
- 2016 Good Design Award, Japan Institute of Design Promotion
- 2017 Good Design Award, Japan Institute of Design Promotion
- 2018 Good Design Award, Japan Institute of Design Promotion
- 2020 Good Design Award, Japan Institute of Design Promotion
- 2021 Good Design Award, Japan Institute of Design Promotion
- Society of Architects and Building Engineers, 2003 Award
- Society of Architects and Building Engineers, 2005 Award
- Japanese Institute of Architect, 2005 Award
- Japanese Institute of Architect, 2006 Award
- Japanese Institute of Architect, 2010 Award
