= Watanabe Hajime (samurai) =

Samurai

Watanabe Hajime (1534–1612), son of Watanabe Tōru, was a Japanese samurai of the Sengoku period, who served the Mōri clan. He fought at the Battle of Kanbe (1548), against the Hiraga clan of Takayatozaki castle (1551), against the Miya clan of Takiyama Castle (1552), at Miyajima (1555) and at Moji (1561). In 1586, he took part in the invasion of Kyushu. In 1588, he went to Kyoto with Mōri Terumoto, and received from Toyotomi Hideyoshi the title of Hida no kami (Governor of Hida Province). He is listed as one of the eighteen generals of the Mōri.
