= Mitsuki Watanabe =

Japanese footballer

Personal information
- Date of birth: 6 September 1987 (age 39)
- Place of birth: Kunimi, Nagasaki, Japan
- Height: 1.77 m (5 ft 10 in)
- Position: Defender

Team information
- Current team: YSCC Yokohama
- Number: 2

Youth career
- 2003–2005: Nagasaki Prefectural; Kunimi High School
- 2006–2009: Hosei University FC

Senior career*
Years	Team	Apps	(Gls)
2010–	YSCC Yokohama	92	(0)
- * Club domestic league appearances and goals as of 23 February 2016

Mitsuki Watanabe (渡邉三城, Watanabe, Mitsuki; born 6 September 1987 in Kunimi, Nagasaki) is a Japanese footballer who plays as a defender for YSCC Yokohama.

== Club statistics ==
Updated to 23 February 2016.

Club performance			League		Cup		Total	
Season	Club	League	Apps	Goals	Apps	Goals	Apps	Goals
Japan			League		Emperor's Cup		Total	
2010	YSCC Yokohama	JRL	4	0	0	0	4	0
2011	YSCC Yokohama	JRL	13	0	1	0	14	0
2012	YSCC Yokohama	JFL	16	0	2	0	18	0
2013	YSCC Yokohama	JFL	22	0	–		22	0
2014	YSCC Yokohama	J3 League	20	0	1	0	21	0
2015	YSCC Yokohama	J3 League	17	0	–		17	0
Career total			92	0	4	0	96	0
