= Natsuhiko Watanabe =

Japanese footballer

Personal information
- Date of birth: 26 June 1995 (age 31)
- Place of birth: Tokyo, Japan
- Height: 1.70 m (5 ft 7 in)
- Position: Forward

Youth career
- Gekkouhara S.C.
- –2011: FC Toripletta
- 2011–2014: Kokugakuin University Kugayama HS
- 2014–2018: Keio University

Senior career*
Years	Team	Apps	(Gls)
2018	VfR Aalen	2	(0)
2019–2020	FC Memmingen	28	(3)
2020–2023	FV Illertissen	23	(3)
- * Club domestic league appearances and goals as of 1 January 2024

Natsuhiko Watanabe (渡辺 夏彦, Watanabe Natsuhiko; born 26 June 1995) is a Japanese footballer who plays as a forward.

== Career ==
Watanabe joined FC Memmingen in Germany on 1 January 2019.
