= Hidemasa =

- Gender: Male

Origin
- Origin: Japanese
- Meaning: Different meanings depending on the kanji used

Hidemasa (written: 秀政, 秀匡, 秀征 or 英正) is a masculine Japanese given name. Notable people with the name include:

- Chiyotairyū Hidemasa (千代大龍 秀政; born 1988), Japanese sumo wrestler
- Hori Hidemasa (堀 秀政; 1553–1590), Japanese samurai
- Hidemasa Hoshino (星野 英正; born 1977), Japanese golfer
- Koide Hidemasa (小出 秀政; 1539–1604), Japanese samurai
- Nakagawa Hidemasa (中川 秀政; 1568–1592), Japanese samurai
- Hidemasa Sano (佐野 秀匡; born 1984), Japanese swimmer
