= Izumi Province =

Former province of Japan

The characters 泉州 are also used for the name of the Chinese city of Quanzhou.

Map of Japanese provinces (1868) with Izumi Province highlighted

Izumi Province (和泉国, Izumi no Kuni; Japanese pronunciation: [í.(d͡)zɨ̀.mʲì (nò̞ kɯ̈̀.ɲ̟ì)]) was a province of Japan in the area of southern Osaka Prefecture. It bordered on Kii to the south, Yamato and Kawachi to the east, and Settsu to the north. Its abbreviated form name was Senshū (泉州). In terms of the Gokishichidō system, Izumi was one of the provinces of the Kinai circuit. Under the Engishiki classification system, Izumi was ranked as one of the "inferior countries" (下国) in terms of importance. The provincial capital was located in the Fuchi neighborhood of what is now the city of Izumi. The ichinomiya of the province is the Ōtori taisha also located in Sakai.

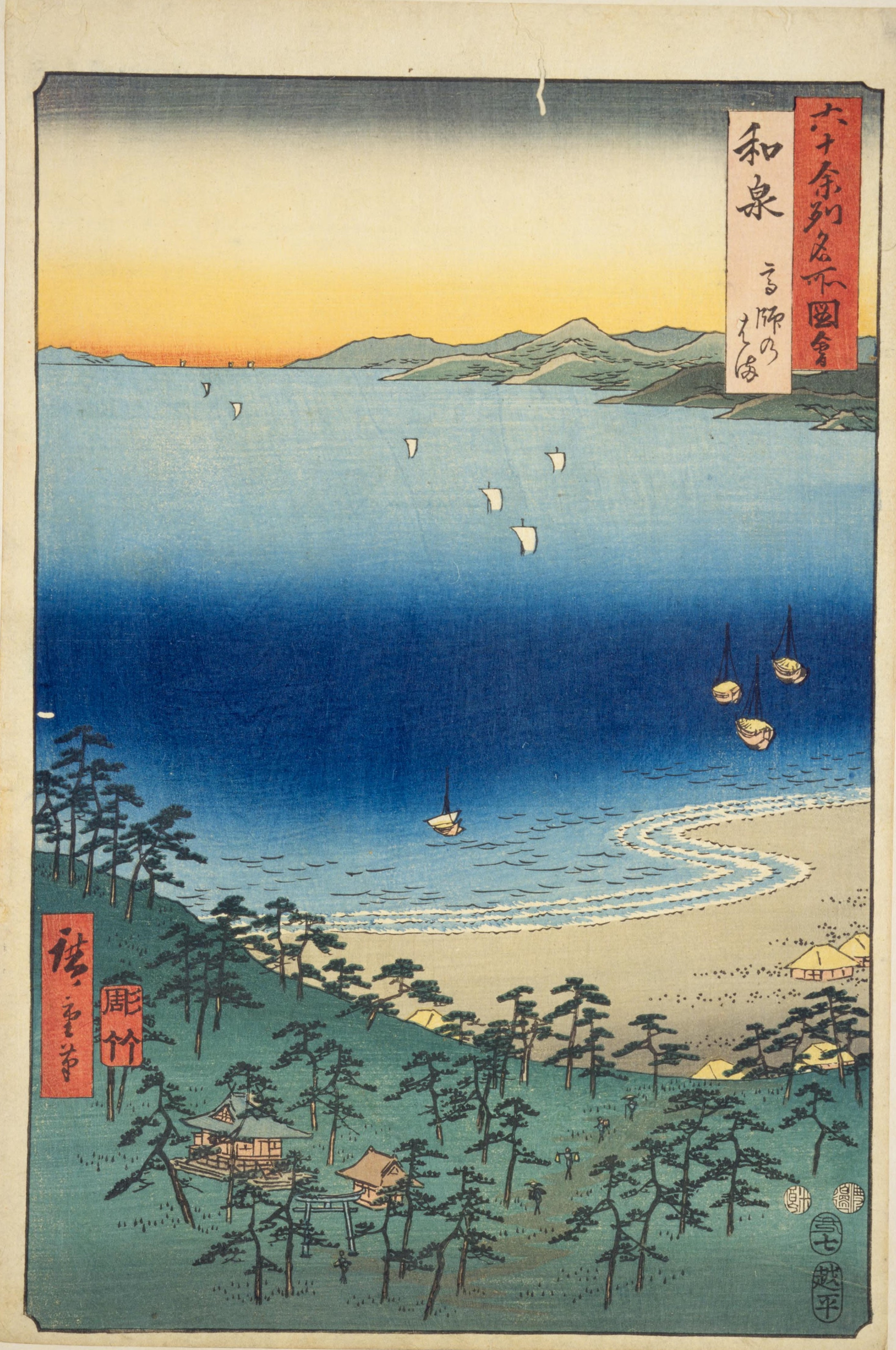
Hiroshige ukiyo-e "Izumi" in "The Famous Scenes of the Sixty States" (六十余州名所図会), depicting Takaishi beach

== History ==
=== Early history ===
According to the Shoku Nihongi, the Izumi and Hine Districts were separated from Kawachi Province on 23 April 716; moreover, on 8 May that same year, the Ōtori District was also separated from Kawachi, and the three districts were made into a province named Izumi-gen (和泉監). The name "Izumi" means "fountain" or "spring" (泉), but is written with two characters, the character for "peace" (和) being prepended due to an imperial edict in 713. This character does not play into the reading. An imperial villa, Chinu Palace (茅渟宮, Chinu no Miya; also known as "Izumi Palace") was in the area, and it seems that this has something to do with the unusual classification of gen (監): Yoshino-gen was the only other province with this designation. Afterwards, on 15 September 740, Izumi was abolished and merged back into Kawachi province. On 30 May 757, it was re-established with a normal province designation kuni (国).

According to the Nihon Kiryaku, on 21 April 825, four counties from Settsu Province: Higashinari, Nishinari, Kudara, and Sumiyoshi were incorporated into Izumi Province, but the local residents were opposed to this change, so the area was restored to Settsu on 8 August the same year.

The provincial capital of Izumi was located in what is now the Fuchu neighborhood of the city of Izumi, Osaka. 34°29′7.97″N 135°25′45.16″E) The site has been excavated and is marked with a stone monument. The provincial temple of Izumi, the Izumi Kokubun-ji was also located in the city of Izumi. There is no record of a provincial nunnery.

The Engishiki record of 927 AD lists one major and 52 minor Shinto shrines in the province. The major shrine is the Ōtori taisha, located in what is now Nishi-ku, Sakai. This was also the ichinomiya of the province. During the Heian period, Izumi was dominated by shōen landed estates, the largest of which was the Hine shōen, which was controlled by the aristocratic Kujō family.

During the Muromachi period, the Ashikaga clan appointed the Hosokawa clan as shugo of Izumi Province. In the early 15th century, the Miyoshi clan (from Awa Province in Shikoku) invaded and defeated the Hosokawa clan and their proxies, and became rulers over a large portion of the Kansai region. Miyoshi Yoshikata (1527-1562), the younger brother of Miyoshi Nagayoshi made Kishiwada Castle his base and extensively rebuilt its fortifications. The Miyoshi also developed Sakai into an international port and profited greatly from trade. Miyoshi rule proved to be short-lived and by the 1560s the clan was in eclipse and Izumi Province had collapsed into a patchwork of local strongmen. It became a battleground between the forces of Oda Nobunaga and the followers of the Saiga Ikki, local followers of the Ikkō-ikki movement, who sought to overthrow the feudal system and establish a theocratic republic, and later under Toyotomi Hideyoshi was the base for his conquest of Kii Province. During this period, Sakai was ruled by a councilor oligarchs, and became very rich on trade with China and the Europeans. It was also a center for matchlock rifle production.

=== Edo Period ===
Under the Tokugawa shogunate, the port of Sakai came under the rule of the Osaka machi-bugyō, and the province itself was divided into a patchwork of holdings directly by the shogunate (tenryō) or various daimyō

Bakumatsu period domains
Name	Clan	Type	kokudaka
Kishiwada	Okabe clan	Fudai	53,000 koku
Hakata	Watanabe clan	Fudai	13,500 koku

== Meiji period ==
Following the Meiji restoration, Sakai became "Sakai Prefecture" in 1868 and gradually absorbed all of the tenryō and holdings of the various daimyō from other areas. The northern border the province with Settsu was adjusted in 1870 with part of the area of Sumiyoshi District of Settsu Province added into Ōtori District. The border was changed from roads of Ōshōji and Nagao Kaidō in Sakai to the Yamato River. Also in 1870, Mikami Domain in Ōmi Province relocated its seat to Yoshimi in Izumi, and was renamed "Yoshimi Domain" briefly before the abolition of the han system several months later in 1871. Yoshimi, Kishiwada and Hakata all became prefectures, which were then merged into Sakai Prefecture (堺県, Sakai ken). Sakai Prefecture was merged into Nara Prefecture on April 18, 1876, but was subsequently transferred to Osaka Prefecture on February 21, 1881 Per the early Meiji period Kyudaka kyuryo Torishirabe-chō (旧高旧領取調帳), an official government assessment of the nation’s resources, the province had 352 villages with a total kokudaka of 170,885 koku. Izumi Province consisted of:

Districts of Izumi Province
District	kokudaka	Controlled by	at present
Ōtori (大鳥郡)	51,595 koku	Tenryō (1 town, 62 villages); Sekiyado (13 villages); Hakata (12 villages); Kishiwada (3 villages)	most of Sakai, Takaishi
Izumi (和泉郡)	30,993 koku	Tenryō (47 villages); Tenryō (1 town, 27 villages); Sekiyado (15 villages); Yoshimi (8 villages); Hakata (4 villages); Koizumi (4 villages); Yodo (4 villages); Kishiwada (2 villages) joint Tenryō/Sekiyado (1 village)	Izumi, most of Izumiōtsu, part of Kishiwada, Tadaoka
Minami (南郡)	32,759 koku	Tenryō (1 town, 14 villages); Kishiwada (2 towns, 54 villages); Yodo (2 villages)	most of Kishiwada, Kaizuka
Hine (日根郡)	55,538 koku	Tenryō (21 villages); Kishiwada (40 villages); Tsuchiura (11 villages); Mikami (4 villages); Yodo (1 village)	Izumisano, Sennan, Hannan, Kumatori, Tajiri, Misaki, part of Kaizuka

The districts were reduced from four to two on April 1, 1896:

- Senboku District (泉北郡) – merger of Ōtori and Izumi Districts; creating a district that covered the former northern part of Izumi Province
- Sennan District (泉南郡) – merger of Minami and Hine Districts; creating a district that covered the former southern part of Izumi Province
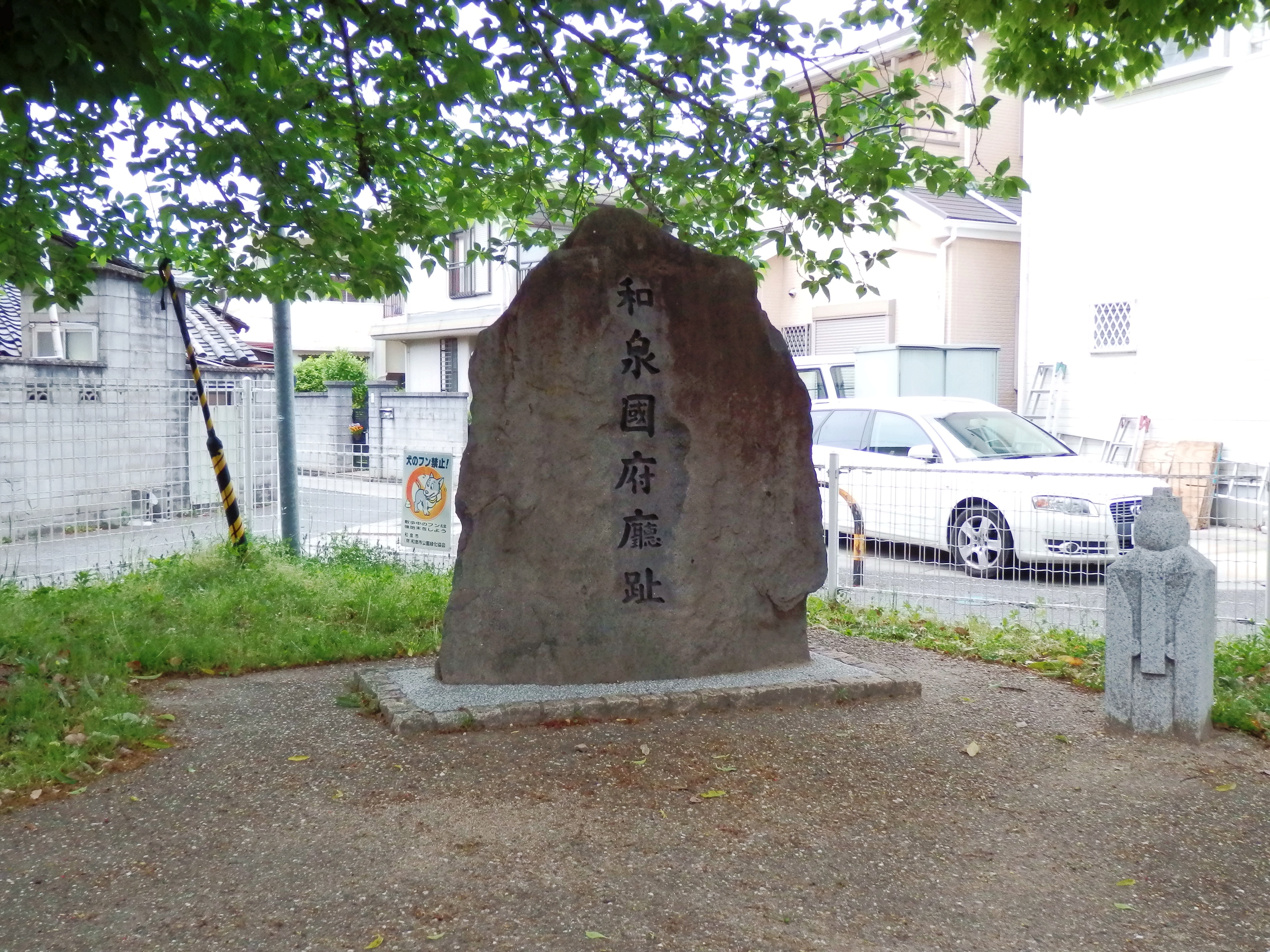
Site of the Izumi kokufu

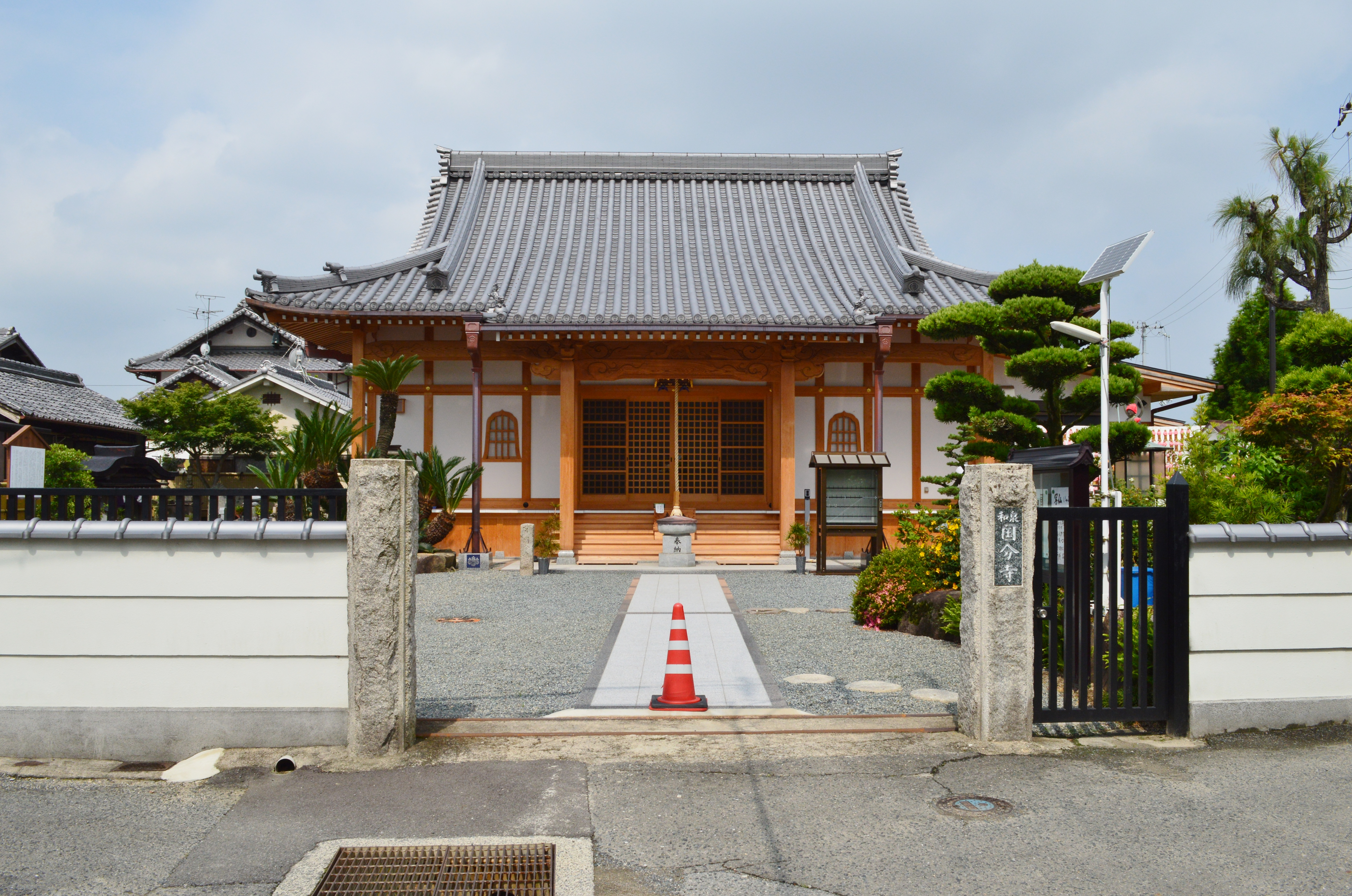
Izumi Kokubun-ji

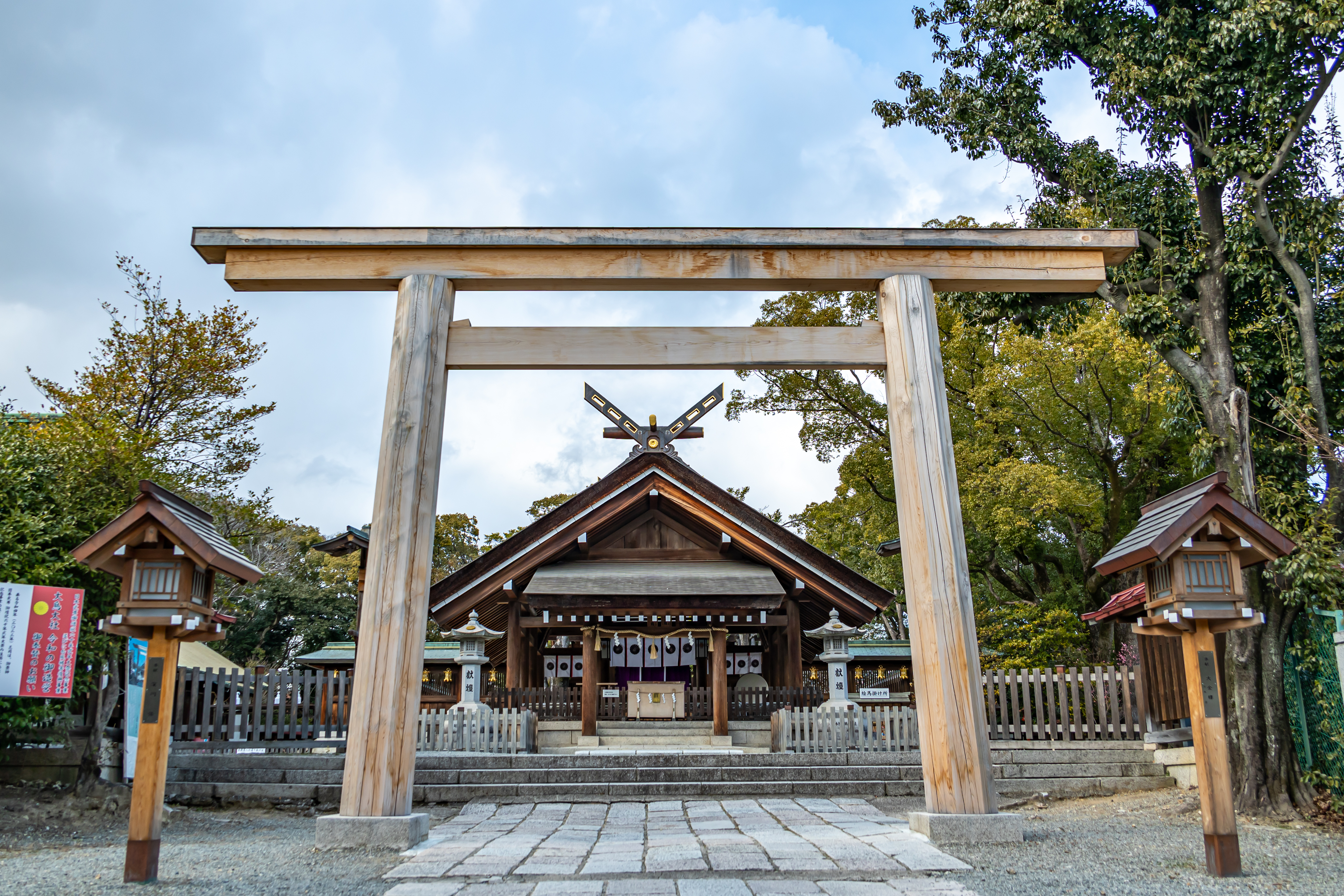
Ōtori Taisha

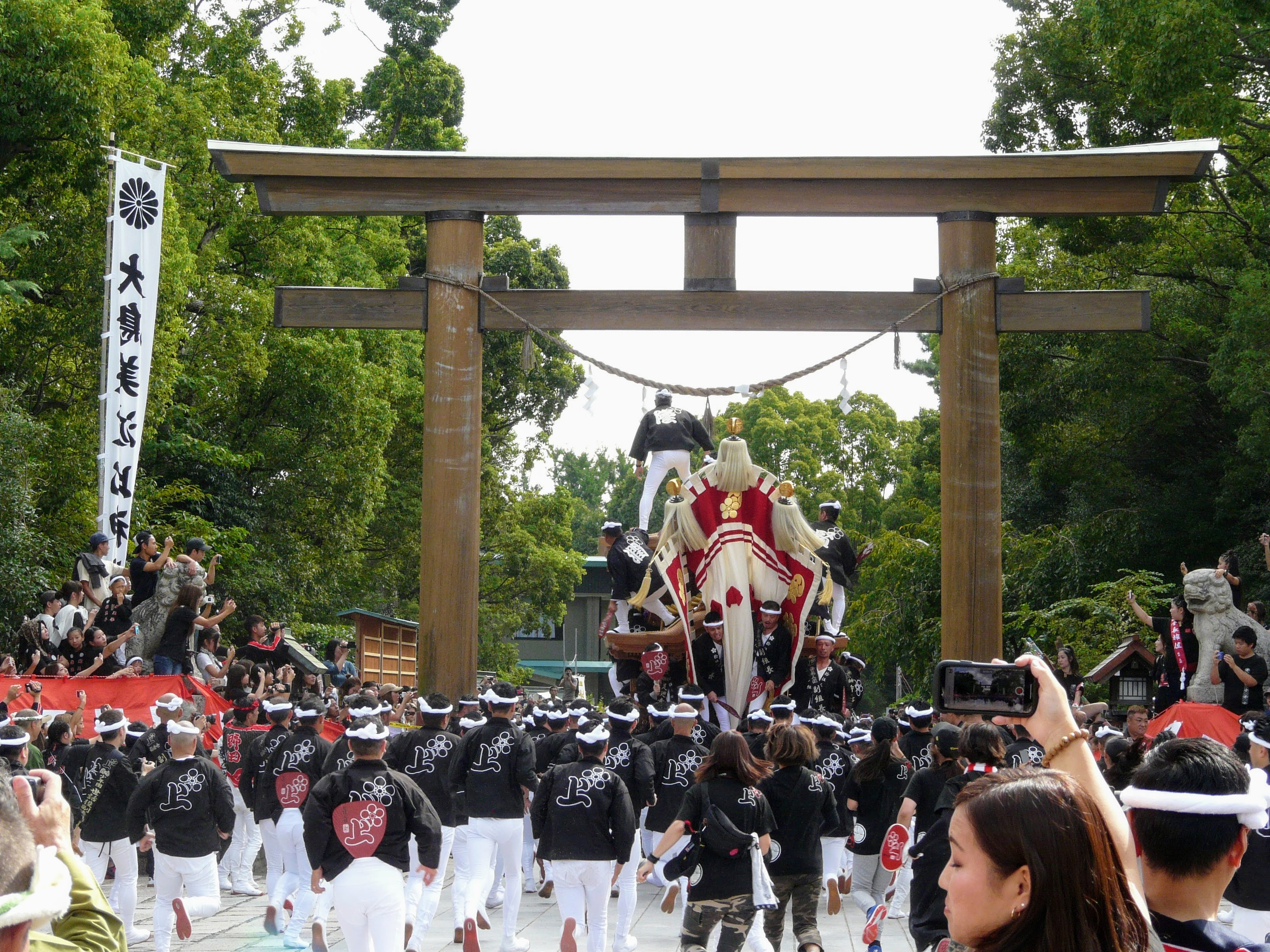
Danjiri matsuri at Ōtori Taisha

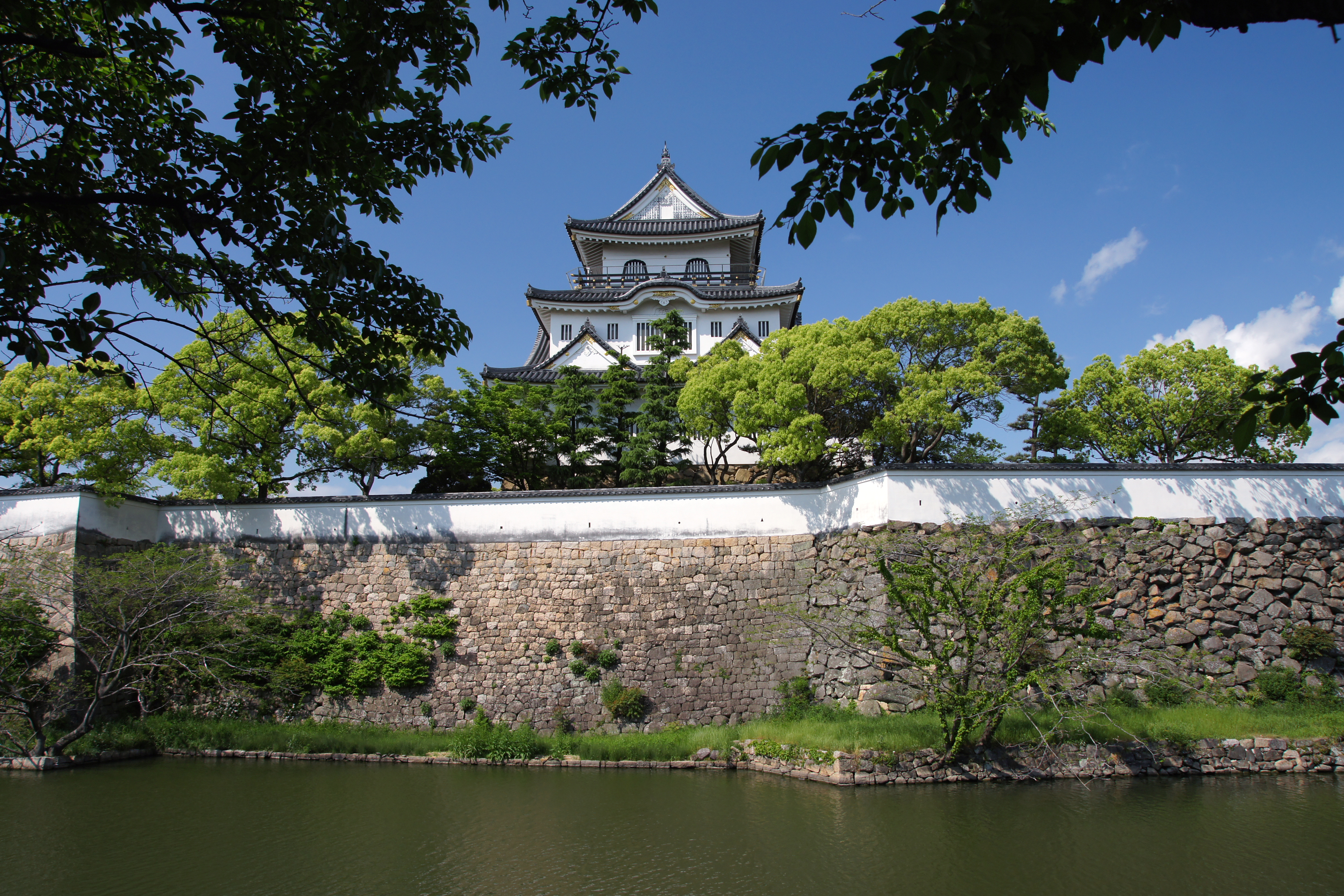
Kishiwada Castle

== Shugo ==
=== Kamakura shogunate ===
- 1196–1203 – Sahara Yoshitsura
- 1207–1221 – Emperor Go-Toba
- 1221–1248 – Henmi clan
- 1249–1261 – Hōjō Shigetoki
- 1279–1300 – Hōjō Tokimura
- 1313–1315 – Hōjō Hiroaki
- 1315–1333 – Hōjō Shigetoki

=== Muromachi shogunate ===
- 1336–1337 – Hatakeyama Kunikiyo
- 1337–1347 – Hosokawa Akiuji
- 1347–1349 – Kō no Moroyasu
- 1349–1351 – Hatakeyama Kunikiyo
- 1351–1352 – Hosokawa Akiuji
- 1352–1359 – Hosokawa Nariuji
- 1359–1360 – Hatakeyama Kunikiyo
- 1360–1361 – Hosokawa Nariuji
- 1369–1378 – Kusunoki Masanori
- 1378–1391 – Yamana Ujikiyo
- 1392–1399 – Ōuchi Yoshihiro
- 1400–1403 – Nishiki Yoshikazu
- 1407–1408 – Oku clan
- 1408–1411 – Hosokawa Yorinaga
- 1408–1448 – Hosokawa Motoyuki
- 1411–1438 – Hosokawa Mochiari
- 1438–1450 – Hosokawa Kiyoharu
- 1448–1483 – Hosokawa Mochihisa
- 1450–1480 – Hosokawa Tsuneari
- 1480–1500 – Hosokawa Motoari
- 1487–1495 – Hosokawa Katsunobu
- 1500–1508 – Hosokawa Mototsune / Hosokawa Masahisa
- 1513–1523 – The Hosokawa clan
- 1523–1531 – Hosokawa Kurō
- 1523–? – Hosokawa Gorō
- 1536–1554 – Hosokawa Mototsune

== Izumi-no-kami ==
- Tachibana no Michisada
- Kakizaki Kageie
- Tōdō Takatora – First generation daimyō of Tsu Domain in Ise Province.
- Tōdō Takatsugu – Second generation daimyō of Tsu Domain in Ise Province.
- Tōdō Takahisa – Third generation daimyō of Tsu Domain in Ise Province.
- Tōdō Takachika – Fourth generation daimyō of Tsu Domain in Ise Province.
- Tōdō Takatoshi – Fifth generation daimyō of Tsu Domain in Ise Province.
- Tōdō Takahora – Seventh generation daimyō of Tsu Domain in Ise Province.
- Tōdō Takanaga – Eighth generation daimyō of Tsu Domain in Ise Province.
- Tōdō Takasato – Ninth generationdaimyō of Tsu Domain in Ise Province.
- Tōdō Takasawa – Tenth generation daimyō of Tsu Domain in Ise Province.
- Tōdō Takayuki – Eleventh generation daimyō of Tsu Domain in Ise Province.
- Matsudaira Ienori – daimyō of Iwamura Domain in Mino Province.
- Matsudaira Norinaga – daimyō of Iwamura Domain in Mino Province, Hamamatsu Domain in Tōtōmi Province, and Tatebayashi Domain in Kōzuke Province; Rōjū.
- Matsudaira Norihisa – daimyō of Tatebayashi Domain in Kōzuke Province and first generation Ōgyū Matsudaira daimyō of Karatsu Domain in Hizen Province.
- Matsudaira Noriharu – Second generation Ōgyū Matsudaira daimyō of Karatsu Domain in Hizen Province.
- Matsudaira Norisato – Third generation Ōgyū Matsudaira daimyō of Karatsu Domain in Hizen Province. daimyō of Toba Domain in Shima Province, Kameyama Domain in Ise Province, Yodo Domain in Yamashiro Province, and Sakura Domain in Shimōsa Province. Rōjū.
- Matsudaira Norisuke – daimyō of Sakura Domain in Shimōsa Province, Yamagata Domain in Dewa Province, and first generation Ōgyū Matsudaira daimyō of Nishio Domain in Mikawa Province.
- Matsudaira Norisada – Second generation Ōgyū Matsudaira daimyō of Nishio Domain in Mikawa Province.
- Matsudaira Norihiro – Third generation Ōgyū Matsudaira daimyō of Nishio Domain in Mikawa Province.
- Matsudaira Noriyasu – Fourth generation Ōgyū Matsudaira daimyō of Nishio Domain in Mikawa Province and Rōjū.
- Matsudaira Noritsune – Fifth generation Ōgyū Matsudaira daimyō of Nishio Domain in Mikawa Province.
- Tōyama Tomomasa – Fourth generation daimyō of Naeki Domain in Mino Province.
- Tōyama Tomonaka – Seventh generation daimyō of Naeki Domain in Mino Province.
- Tōyama Tomokiyo – Ninth generation daimyō of Naeki Domain in Mino Province.
- Enomoto Takeaki

== See also ==
- Japanese cruiser Izumi, warship formerly named Esmeralda
