= Hine-no-shō =

Landed estate in Izumi Provnince

- 日根荘 (Japanese)
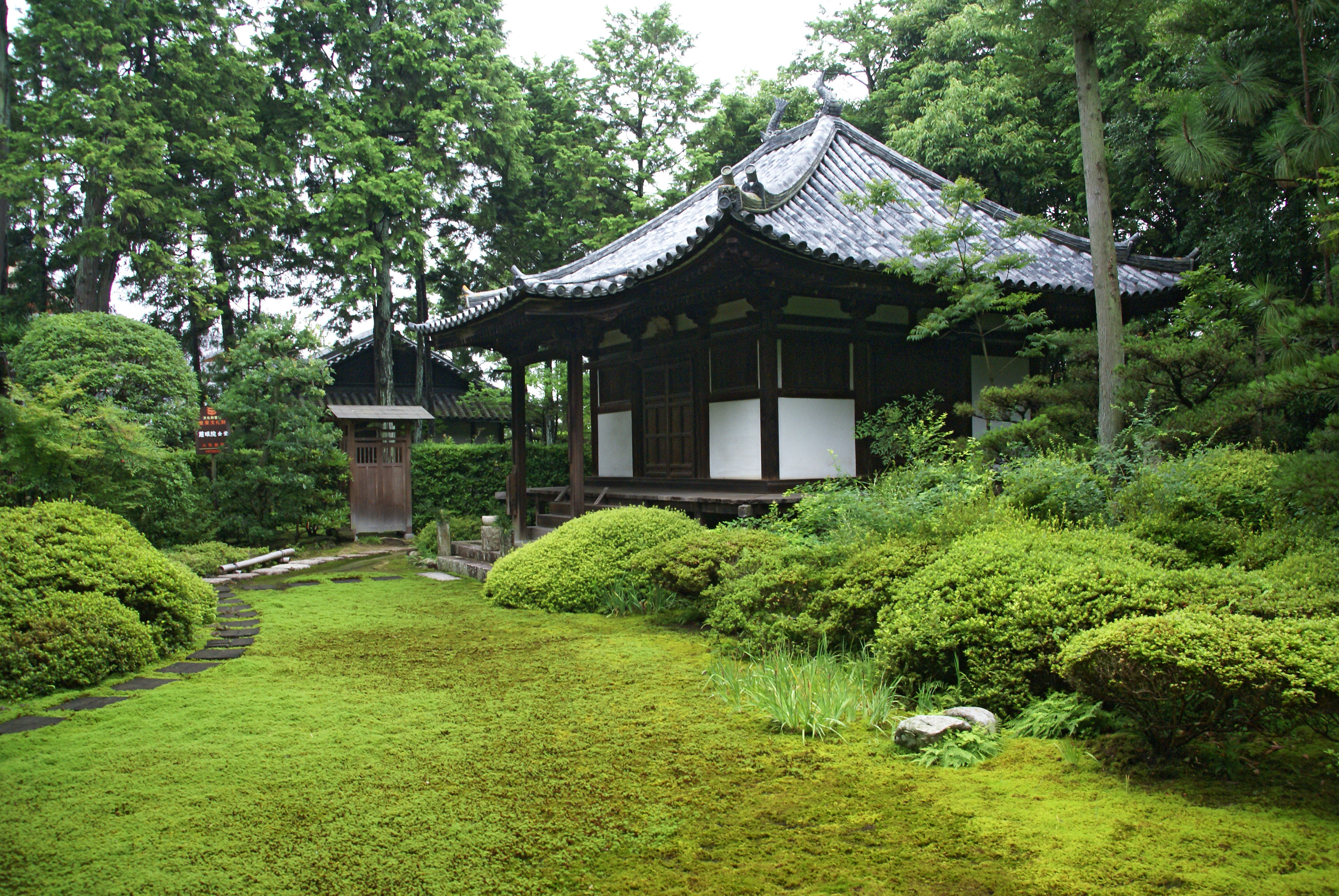
- Jigen-in

- Hine-no-shō Hine-no-shō (Japan)
- 34°21′29.4″N 135°22′3.2″E
- Periods: Kamakura - Sengoku period
- Location: Izumisano Japan
- Region: Kansai region

Site notes
- Public access: Yes

The Hine shōen (日根荘), also known as Hine-no-shō, was a vast shōen, or landed estate which existed in Izumi Province (present-day city of Izumisano, Osaka Prefecture) from the Kamakura period into the Sengoku period. In the year 1988, 14 sites connected with the Hine-no-shō forming a historical landscape were collectively designated a National Historic Site of Japan.This designation was expanded in 2005 with the addition of the ruins of Chōfuku-ji temple and again in 2013 with the addition of Tsuchimaru and Ameyama Castles. It is also a site designated under Japan Heritage.

== Overview ==
The area of Hine-no-shō was undeveloped land upon which Mount Kōya twice (in 1205 and again in 1222) applied for permission to develop into an autonomous tax-free shōen, but even after permission was granted, the temple was unable to fulfill plans to develop the land. In 1234, the aristocrat Kujō Michiie applied to take over the territory, which extended from the coastal area near Osaka Bay to the foothills of the Izumi Mountains. The Kujō family already controlled many shōen which were existing estates which had been received through donation in order to attain tax-free status; however, this was a unique case where the Kujō family developed a new shōen. Initially, the estate extended over the four villages of Iriyamada, Hineno, Ihara, and Tsuruhara, but in the Muromachi period. the shugo of Izumi Province, the Hosokawa clan seized Ihara and Tsuruhara. The remaining two villages correspond to the modern Oki, Tsuchimaru, and Hineno neighborhoods of Izumisano and extend into the neighboring town of Kumatori. Kujō Masamoto, who was kampaku from 1476 to 1479 lived on the shōen from March 1501 to December 1504, leaving behind a detailed record of shrines, temples, irrigation ponds and the Hügelland landscape which form the basis of the National Historic Site Designation.

During the Nanboku-chō period, control of the Kujō family was weakened due to constant wars and the depredations of the samurai, and by the middle of the 16th century, the estate came under the control of Negoro-ji temple.

== List of designated sites of the Hine shōen ==
Name	Location	Comments	Image
Hibashira Jinja (火走神社)	Ōgi	The Honden is a Kasuga-zukuri style building constructed in 1622 and is a National [Important Cultural Property. The main kami is Kagutsuchi no Mikoto. This shrine was also called Takimiya Daimeijin and was associated with Shipporyu-ji temple .	火走神社
Katsumi-ji ruins (香積寺跡)	Ōgi	all that remains is the foundation of the Main Hall and some stone Buddhas and stupas	
Renge-ji (蓮華寺)	Ōgi	Currently used as a community center for Kamiōgi	
Bishamon-dō (毘沙門堂)	Ōgi	The area where the temple is located is located in the middle of the mountainous area of Nakaogi called Goshōdani	毘沙門堂
Enman-ji (円満寺)	Ōgi	Currently used as a community center for Ōgi	円満寺
Chōfuku-ji ruins (長福寺跡)	Ōgi	This was the villa of Kujō Masamoto, which was later converted into a temple. It disappears from historical records after 1611, and appears to have been abolished around this time. Per an archaeological excavation carried out from 2002 to 2003, the ruins were confirmed. The site was backfilled and is now paddy fields.	長福寺跡
Tsuchimaru Castle ruins (土丸城跡)・ Ameyama Castle ruins (雨山城跡)	Tsuchimaru / Kumatori	Also called Shiro-no-yama (城ノ山), these are the ruins of yamashiro-style Japanese castles used from Nanboku-chō period to the Sengoku period, and was used as a refuge by Kujō Masatomo. Some remnants of moats and embankments remain	
Hine Jinja (日根神社)	Hineno	Founded in the Asuka or Nara period and listed in the Engishiki, the shrine claims to be one location where the wounded Itsuse no Mikoto rested during Jimmu's Eastern Expedition to conquer the Yamato Basin after his defeat by Nagamitsu-hiko as described in the Kojiki and the Nihon Shoki. The current Honden was rebuilt by Toyotomi Hideyori in 1602 and is an Osaka Prefectural Tangible Cultural Property. The shrine was a Prefectural shrine in the Modern system of ranked Shinto shrines	日根神社
Jigen-in (慈眼院)	Hineno	By tradition, it was founded in 673 as the jingū-ji of Hine Jinja, and was later patronized by Emperor Shōmu and rebuilt by Kukai. Destroyed in the Nanboku-cho period, it was rebuilt by order of Emperor Go-Murakami and Emperor Go-Kameyama only to be destroyed again by Toyotomi Hideyoshi. Restored in 1602 by Toyotomi Hideyori, it was further restored by Okabe Yukitaka, daimyō of Kishiwada Domain. The temple's wooden Tahō-tō, built in 1271, is a National Treasure and its Kamakura period Kondō, also called the Bishamon-dō, is a National Important Cultural Property.	慈眼院
Sōfuku-ji (総福寺)	Hineno	Contains a Tenman-gū shrine built during the Tenshō era (1573-1585) which is described in Kujō family documents. It is a National Important Cultural Property.	総福寺天満宮
Nonomiya ruins (野々宮跡)	Hineno	Appears under the name Tanyu Daimyōjin (丹生大明神) in Muromachi period maps	
Shindode Ushigami (新道出牛神)	Hineno	Shrine dedicated to cows used in agricultural work	新道出牛神
Junitani-jiike (十二谷池)	Hineno	Ending point for the Yukawa canal	
Yae-jiike (八重治池)	Hineno	A natural pond that existed before the foundation of the shōen.	
Amazu-jiike (尼津池)	Hineno	A natural pond that existed before the foundation of the shōen. It was the water source responsible for irrigation in the Hineno-go area of Iriyamada.	
Yukawa (井川)	Hineno	Irrigation canal separated from the Kashii River. It flows through the precincts of Hine Jinja and Jigen-in and reaches Jujitani Pond.	井川

== See also ==
- List of Historic Sites of Japan (Osaka)
