= Endō Taneki =

- 遠藤胤城
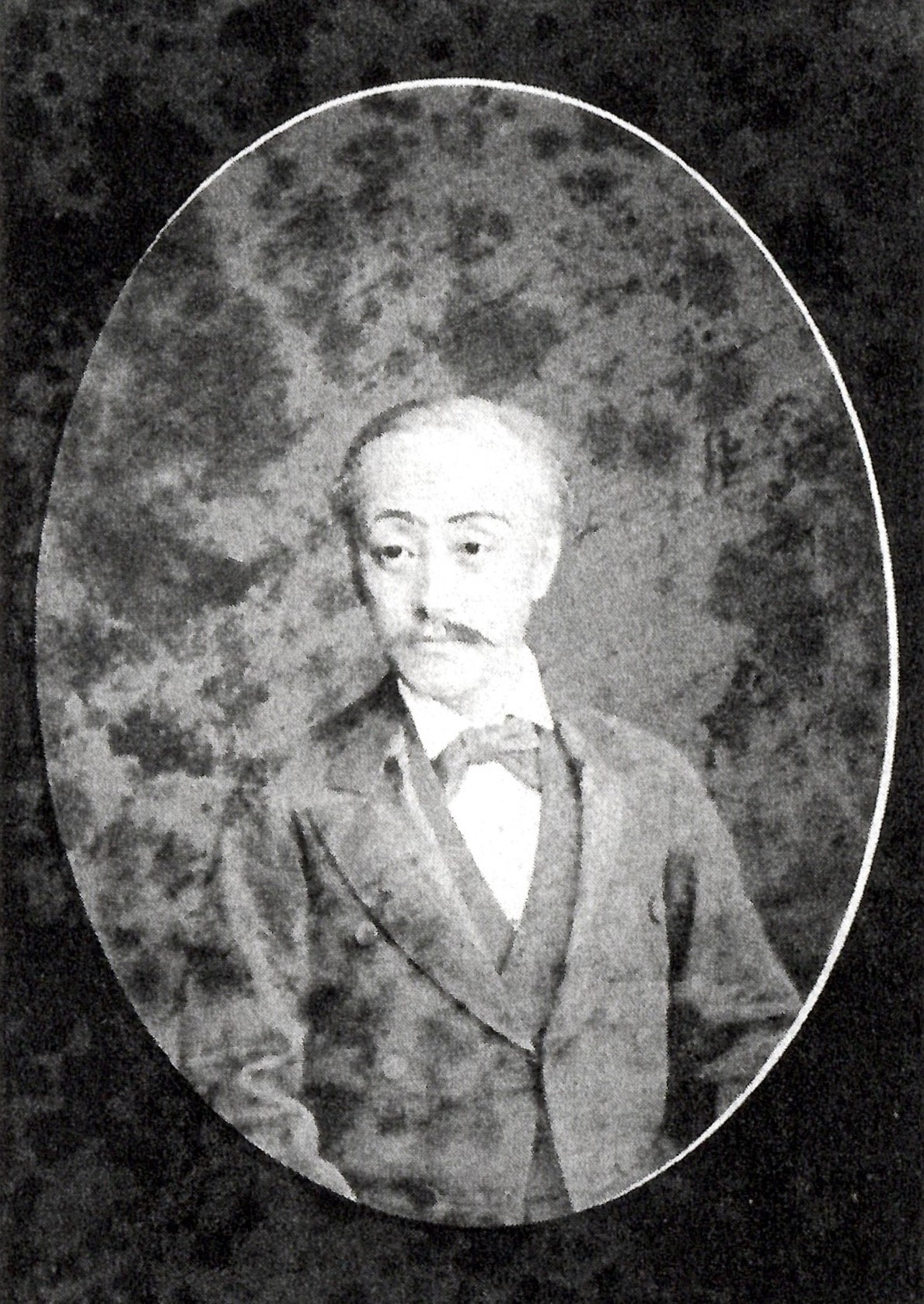
- Endō Taneki, post-Meiji restoration

6th Daimyō of Mikami Domain
- In office 1863–1868
- Monarchs: Shōgun: Tokugawa Iemochi; Tokugawa Yoshinobu
- Preceded by: Endō Tsunenori
- Succeeded by: < position abolished >

Imperial Governor of Mikami / Yoshimi
- In office 1869–1871
- Monarch: Emperor Meiji

Personal details
- Born: July 25, 1838; Chūō-ku, Osaka
- Died: November 9, 1909 (aged 71)
- Parent: Endō Tsunenori (father)

Endō Taneki (遠藤胤城; July 25, 1838 – November 9, 1909) was the 6th (and final) daimyō of Mikami Domain in Bakumatsu period Japan. Before the Meiji Restoration, his courtesy title was Mino-no-kami, Bizen-no-kami, and Tajima-no-kami, and his Court rank was Lower Fifth Rank, Junior grade. After the Meiji restoration, he changed his surname to Tō (東) and his final court rank was Third Court rank.

== Biography ==
Endō Taneki was the third son of the 5th daimyō of Mikami, Endō Tsunenori and was born in Tamazukuri, Chūō-ku, Osaka. Endō Tsunenori already had an heir by adoption, Endō Tanemasa, so the young Endō Taneki was adopted as Endō Tanemasa's heir in 1845. However, Endō Kanemasa died in 1856 before he could inherit, and therefore Endō Taneki was able to succeed his birth father as daimyō in 1863. This was during the tumultuous Bakumatsu period. He served as a kaban at Osaka Castle and as a bugyō of the Kōbusho, the shogunal military academy. During the abortive Second Chōshū expedition of 1866, he was assigned to lead the forces of the Kōbusho in battle. and in 1867 was appointed a sōshaban in the shogunal administration. However, after the start of the Boshin War, he did not show any clear allegiance, and therefore his territories were seized by the new Meiji government. However, he was allowed to return to his territories only four months later as imperial governor after pledging fealty to the new regime. He relocated his seat from Mikami to Yoshimi in Izumi Province in 1870, where he remained until the abolition of the han system in 1871.

He relocated to Tokyo, and changed his surname from Endō to "Tō" in 1878. In 1884, he became a viscount (shishaku) in the new kazoku peerage system. In Tokyo, he became a noted master of the Japanese tea ceremony and was called "Sōun". In 1898, he became a member of the rotating tea ceremony group called "Wakeikai" (和敬会), which included many former daimyō and members of the military.

He died in 1909 and his grave is at the clan bodaiji of Chōkyō-ji in Nishiasakusa in Taitō, Tokyo.

His wife was a daughter of Hori Chikashige of Iida Domain.
