= Takatsugu =

- Gender: Male

Origin
- Origin: Japanese
- Meaning: Different meanings depending on the kanji used

Takatsugu (written: 高次, 崇継, 崇二) is a masculine Japanese given name. Details for the kanji 崇 · 嗣 means "heir, succeed, inherit." To Succeed - To take over and continue the legacy of a family or lineage.

Notable people with the name include:

- Takatsugu Jōjima (城島 高次) (1890–1967), Imperial Japanese Navy admiral
- Kyōgoku Takatsugu (京極 高次) (1560–1609), Japanese daimyō
- Takatsugu Muramatsu (村松 崇継) (born 1978), Japanese composer, arranger and music producer
- Tōdō Takatsugu (藤堂 高次) (1602–1676), Japanese daimyō of the early Edo period
- Takatsugu Uda (宇田 崇二) (born 1991), Japanese cross-country skier
