= Ōtori taisha =

Shinto shrine in Sakai, Osaka, Japan

Ōtori taisha 大鳥大社
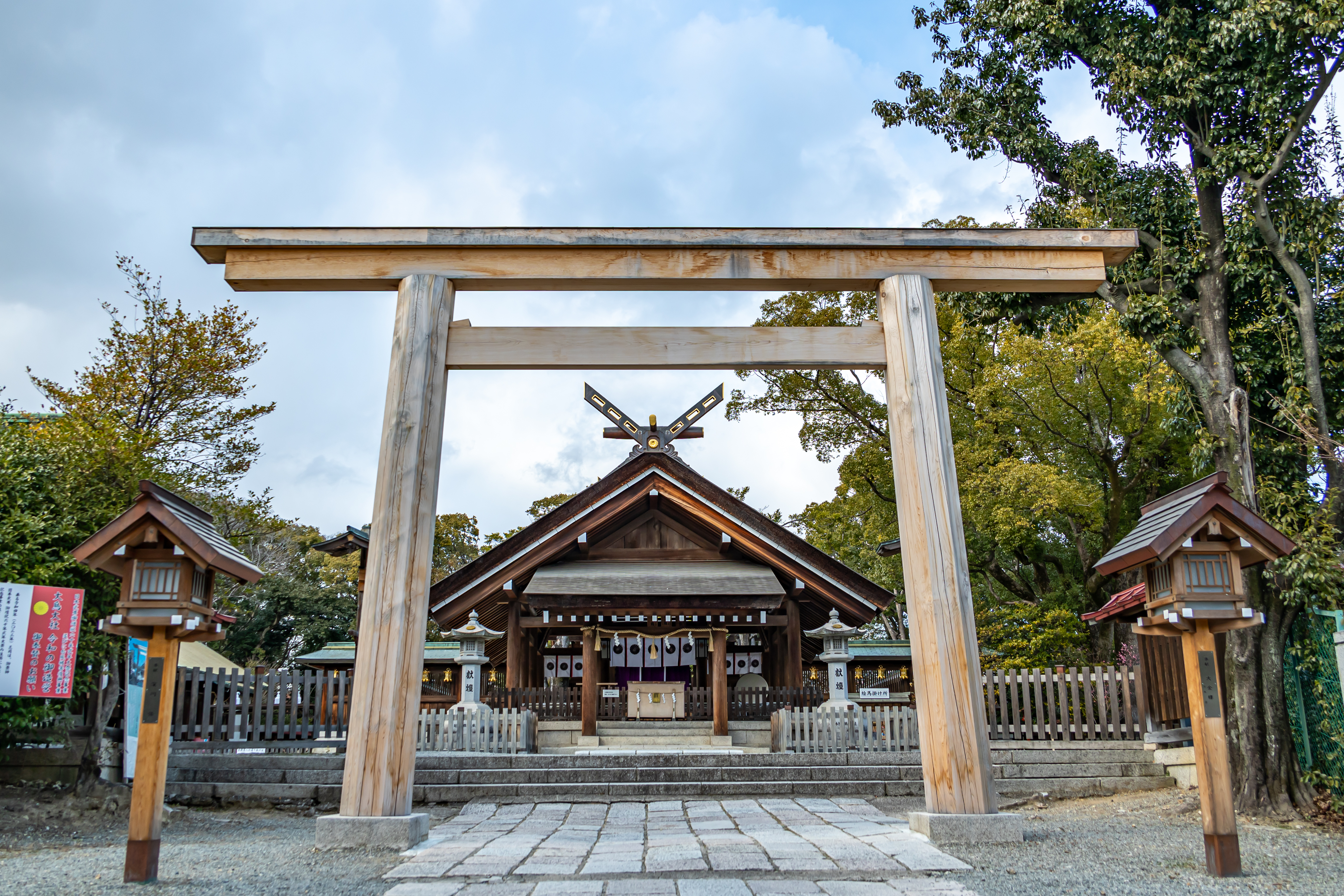
- Haiden of Ōtori Taisha

- Location within Osaka Prefecture Location within Japan

Religion
- Affiliation: Shinto
- Deity: Ōtori-no-muraji and Yamato Takeru
- Festival: August 13

Location
- Location: 1-2 Ōtorikita-machi 1-chō, Nishi-ku, Sakai-shi, Osaka-fu 593-8328, Japan
- Interactive map of Ōtori taisha 大鳥大社
- Coordinates: 34°32′12.7″N 135°27′38.7″E

Architecture
- Style: Ōtori-zukuri
- Established: c.Nara period

Website
- Official website

Ōtori Shrine (大鳥大社, Ōtori Taisha) is a Shinto shrine located in Nishi-ku, Sakai, Osaka Prefecture, Japan. It is the ichinomiya of former Izumi Province. The shrine's main festival is held annually on August 13.

== Shrine name and legend ==
The shrine has been called variously as Ōtori-daimyōjin (大鳥大明神) or Ōtori-no-Ōmiya (大鳥大神宮) in the past. Although Ōtori Jinja (大鳥神社) is the correct name, “Ōtori Taisha” has gained widespread popular acceptance. According to the shrine's legend, its foundation has strong connections with the Yamato Takeru mythology. According to the Kojiki and the Nihon Shoki, as the folk hero Yamato Takeru was returning home after his conquests in eastern Japan, he feel ill after blasphemy against the deity of Mount Ibuki and died in Ise Province. However, after he was buried in a burial mound, a white heron emerged from the tomb and flew westward. It stopped at two places (and kofun were built at each location) before disappearing to the heavens. However, per the legend of this shrine, the white heron made one final stop at the Chigusa-no-mori (千種森), a forest in Izumi Province, where this shrine was later built.

== Enshrined kami ==
The kami enshrined at Ōtori Jinja are:

- Yamato Takeru (日本武尊), son of Emperor Keikō and folk hero
- Ōtori-no-muraji-no-oyagami (大鳥連祖神), ancestor of the Fujiwara clan

== History ==
There is little documentary evidence and it is uncertain when this shrine was first built. Architecturally, the buildings are constructed in the Ōtori-zukuri (大鳥造) which is believed to be a very ancient style of Shinto architecture, second only to the style of Izumo Taisha. The first mention of the shrine in documentation comes from an entry in the Nihon Kōki dated 823 AD, in which the Imperial Court requested that the shrine pray for rain. The name also appears in the Shoku Nihon Kōki and the Nihon Sandai Jitsuroku, either in connection with prayer srelating to weather, or promotions in the shrine's official status. By the time of the 923 AD Engishiki, the shrine is styled as the only shrine in Izumi Province to be a Myōjin-taisha (名神大社) and as an indication of its importance, an imperial messenger was dispatched to attend its annual Niiname-no-Matsuri. During this period, the shrine was under the control of Shinpu-ji (神鳳寺), a Buddhist temple said to have been founded by Gyōki in either 708 AD or 740 AD. The temple had close connections with the Five regent houses of the Fujiwara clan. During the Kamakura period, branches of the shrine were built at many locations around the country, mostly in connection with shōen estates controlled by the Fujiwara, and around this time the shrine came to be called the ichinomiya of Izumi Province. During the premodern period, the main kami worshipped at the Ōtori-daimyōjin was Amaterasu, although the shrine's connection with the Yamato Takeru myth was well-known, and Yamato Takeru was enshrined as a secondary kami.

During the Sengoku period, Oda Nobunaga confiscated the shrine's estates, valued at 1300 koku, in 1575. The shrine was burned down, but was one of a series of shrines and temples rebuilt in 1602 by order of Toyotomi Hideyori. The shrine was destroyed again during the 1615 Siege of Osaka. In 1662, Shinpu-ji and the Ōtori-daimyōjin were reconstructed by the Sakai bugyō per instructions by the Tokugawa shogunate and were repaired in 1701 by Yanagisawa Yoshiyasu. Under the patronage of Yanagisawa, the temple became the head temple of the "Shingon Risshū Southern School" and had 76 daughter temples, mainly in the Kansai region. The shrine's fortunes waxed and waned together with the temple, although with the growth of kokugaku studies towards the Bakumatsu period there were increasing calls for the shrine's rehabilitation. This goal was realized with the separation of Shinto and Buddhism following the Meiji restoration, when Shingu-ji was destroyed and Ōtori Jinja reemerged as a purely Shinto shrine. In 1871, the shrine was designated an Imperial Shrine, 1st rank (官幣大社, Kanpei-taisha) under the Modern system of ranked Shinto shrines, and in 1876, after reevaluation, the resident kami was changed from Amaterasu to Ōtori-no-muraji-no-oyagami (大鳥連祖神), who was identified with Ame-no-Koyane, the ancestor of the Fujiwara clan. This caused a backlash from the shrine; however, despite vehement ongoing protest, the ruling was upheld by the government in 1896. Ongoing efforts to make Yamato Takeru the resident kami were also ignored by the government, and it was not until 1961 that the shrine was able to install Yamato Takeru next to Ōtori-no-muraji. The main shrine building was destroyed by lightning on August 15, 1905, and the current Honden was rebuilt in December 1909.

The shrine is five minutes on foot from Otori Station on the JR West Hanwa Line.

== Gallery ==
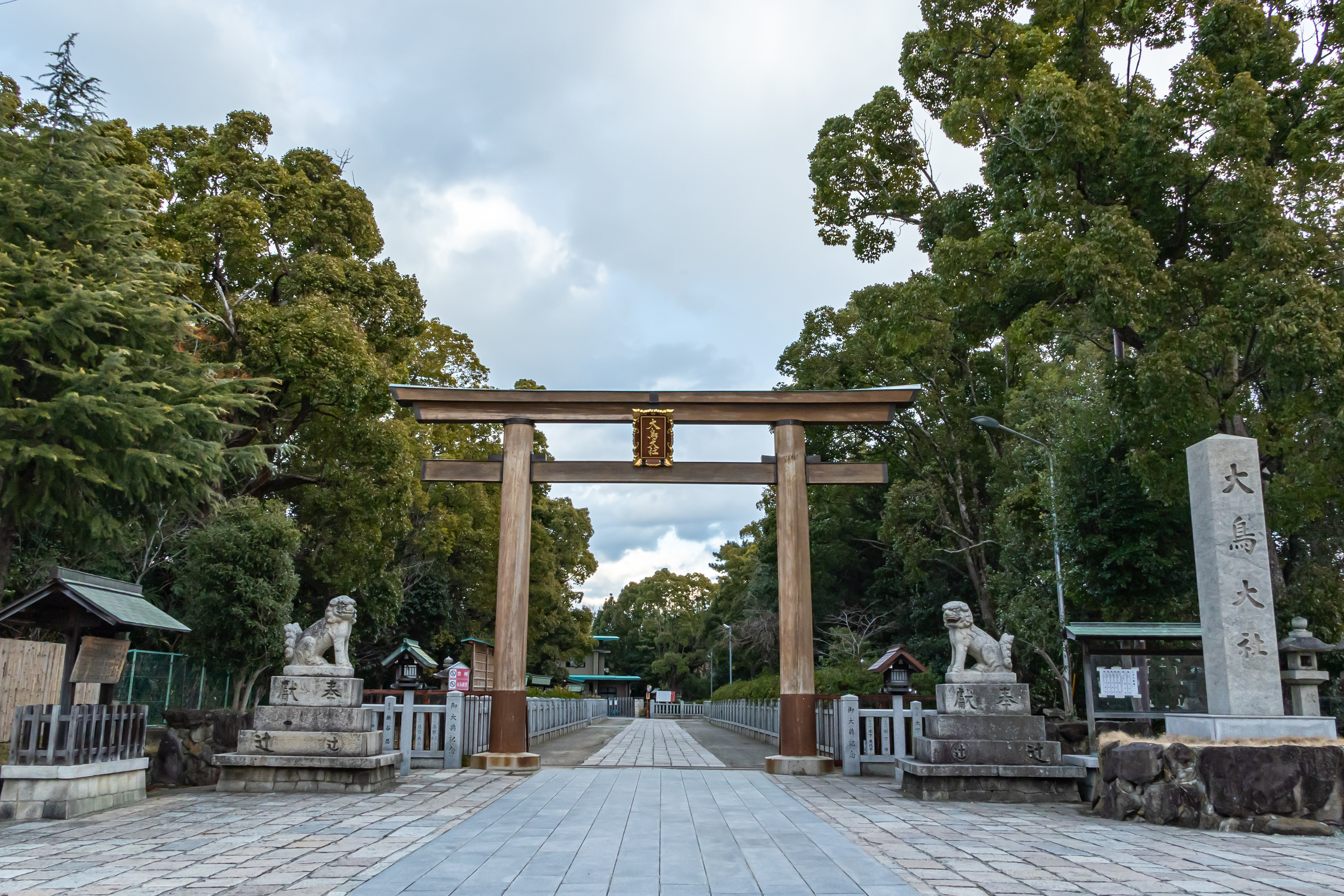
A torii gate at the entrance of a shrine

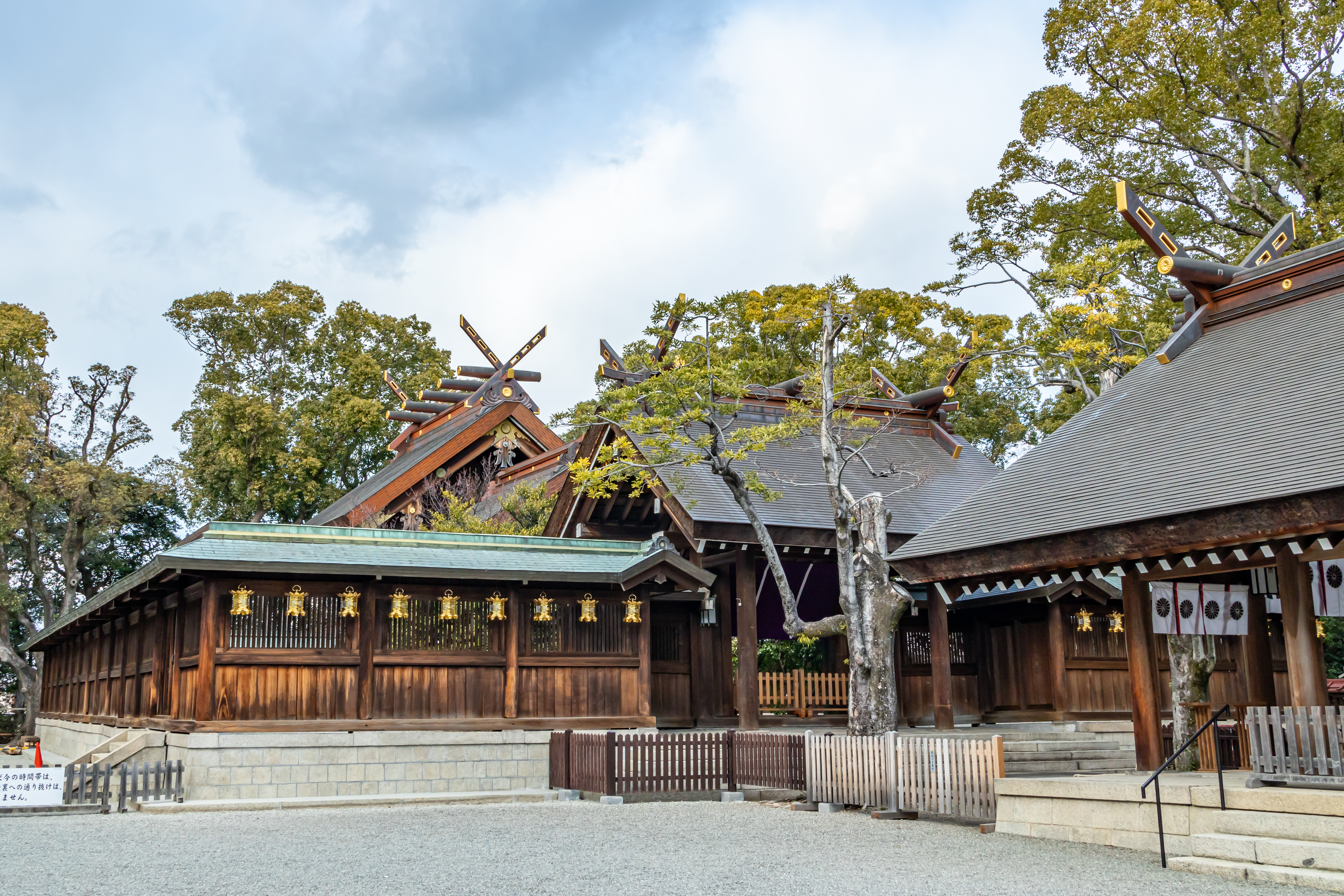
Honden

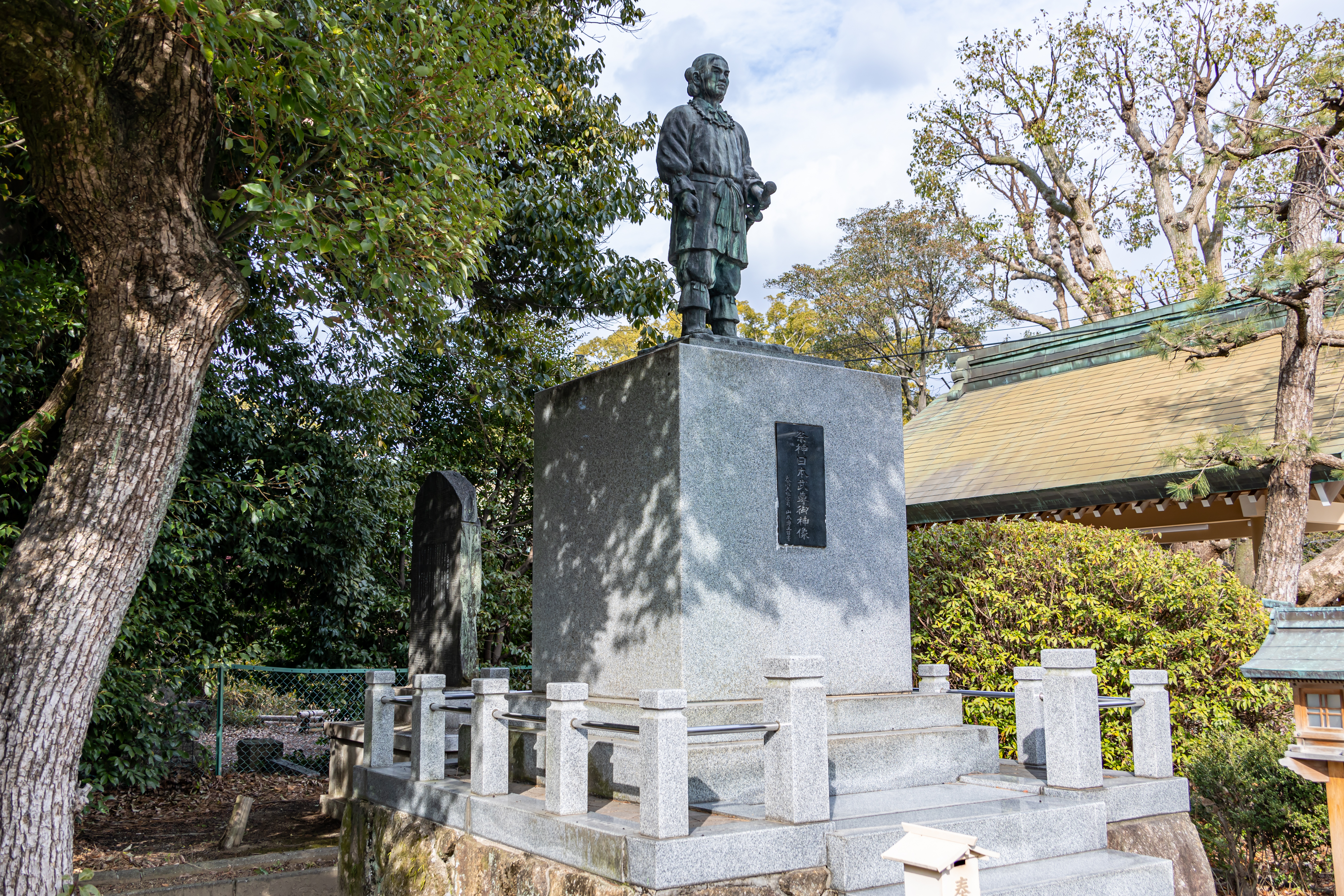
Statue of Yamato Takeru

== Festival ==
The shrine holds a Danjiri Matsuri festival is held every year on the weekend of the first week of October.

Danjiri Matsuri at Ōtori taisha

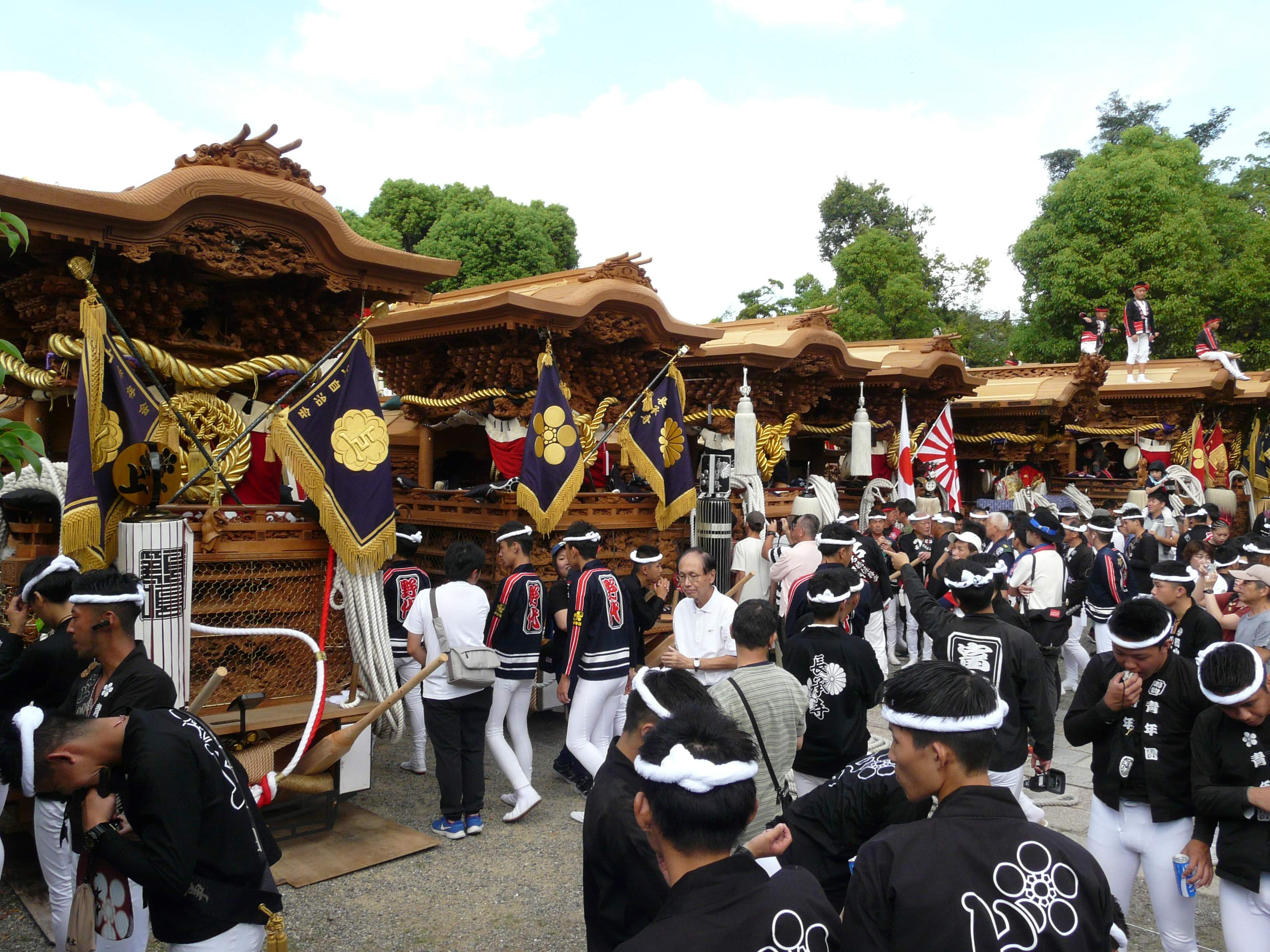
At grounds of Ōtori taisha.

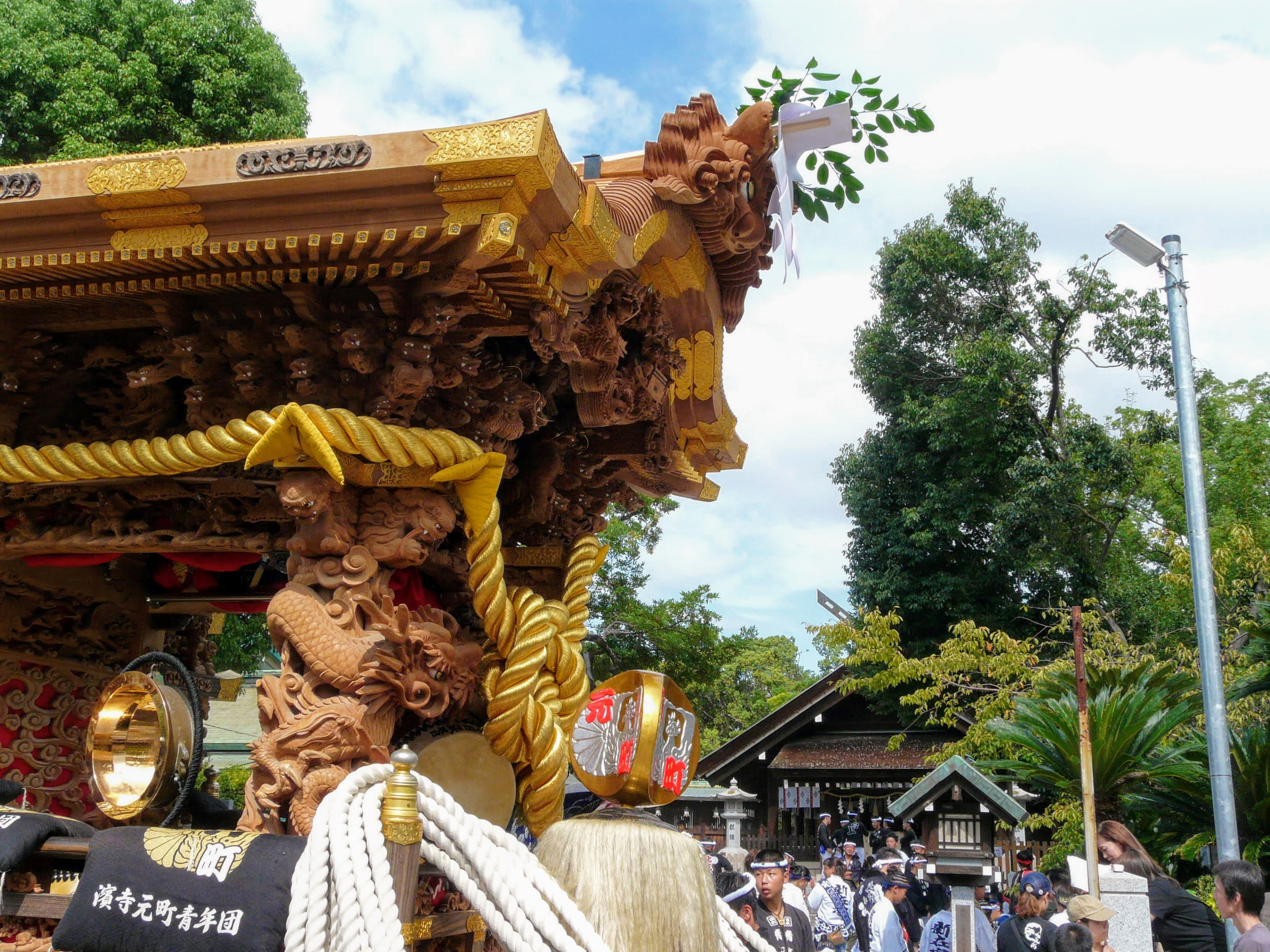
At grounds of Ōtori taisha.

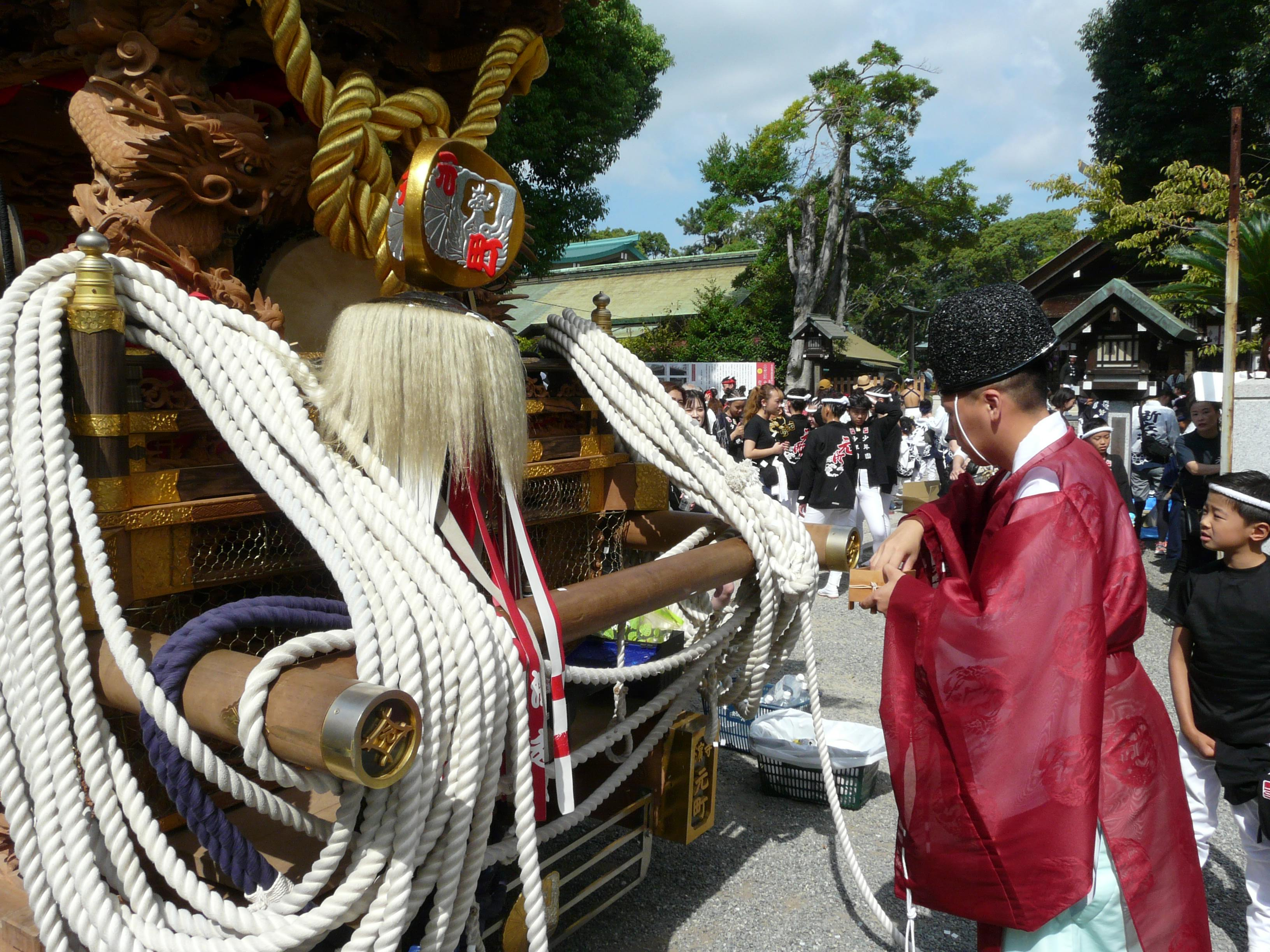
A priest of Ōtori taisha prays for the safety of the festival.

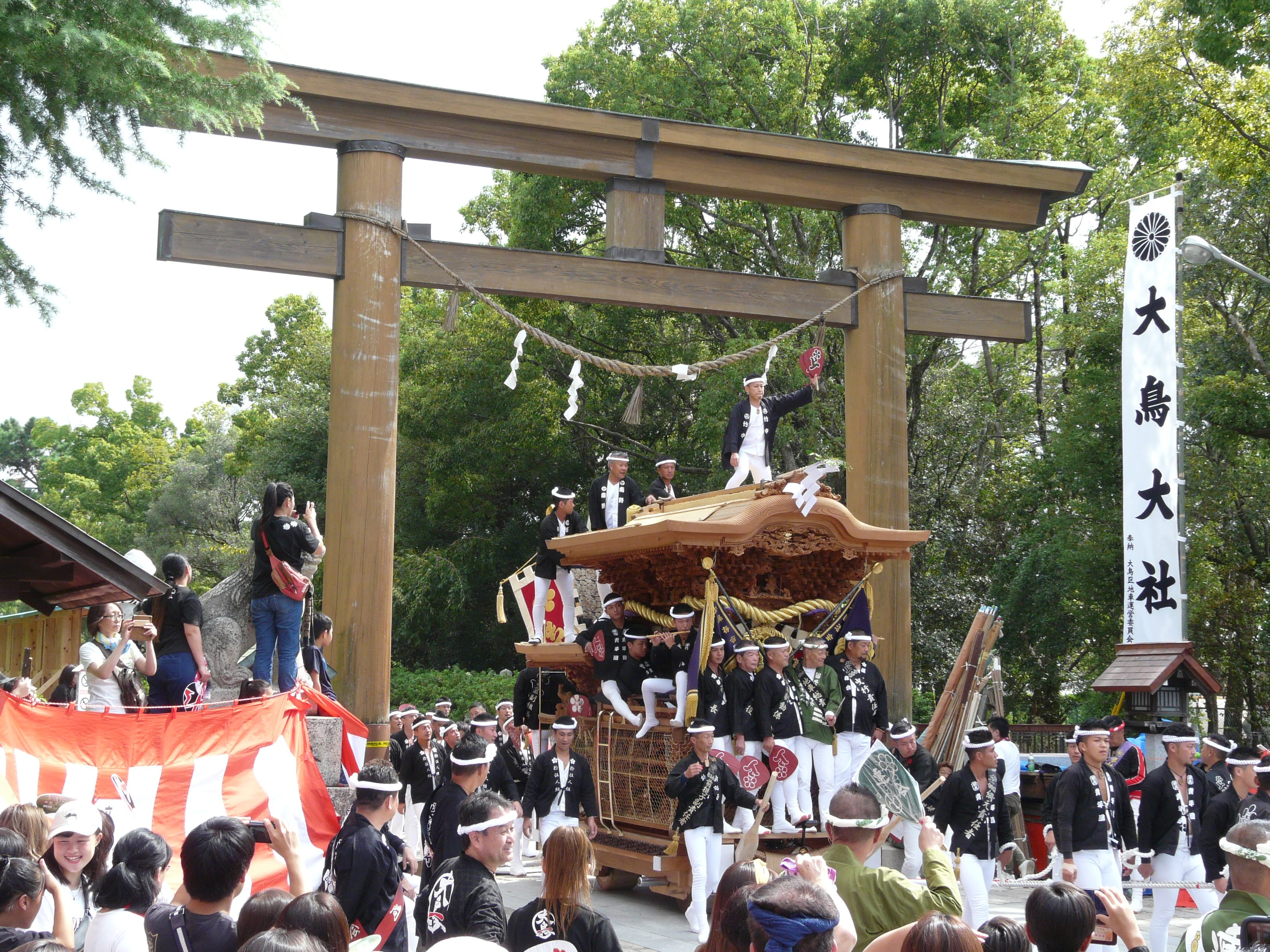
Torii gate of the main entrance to Ōtori taisha

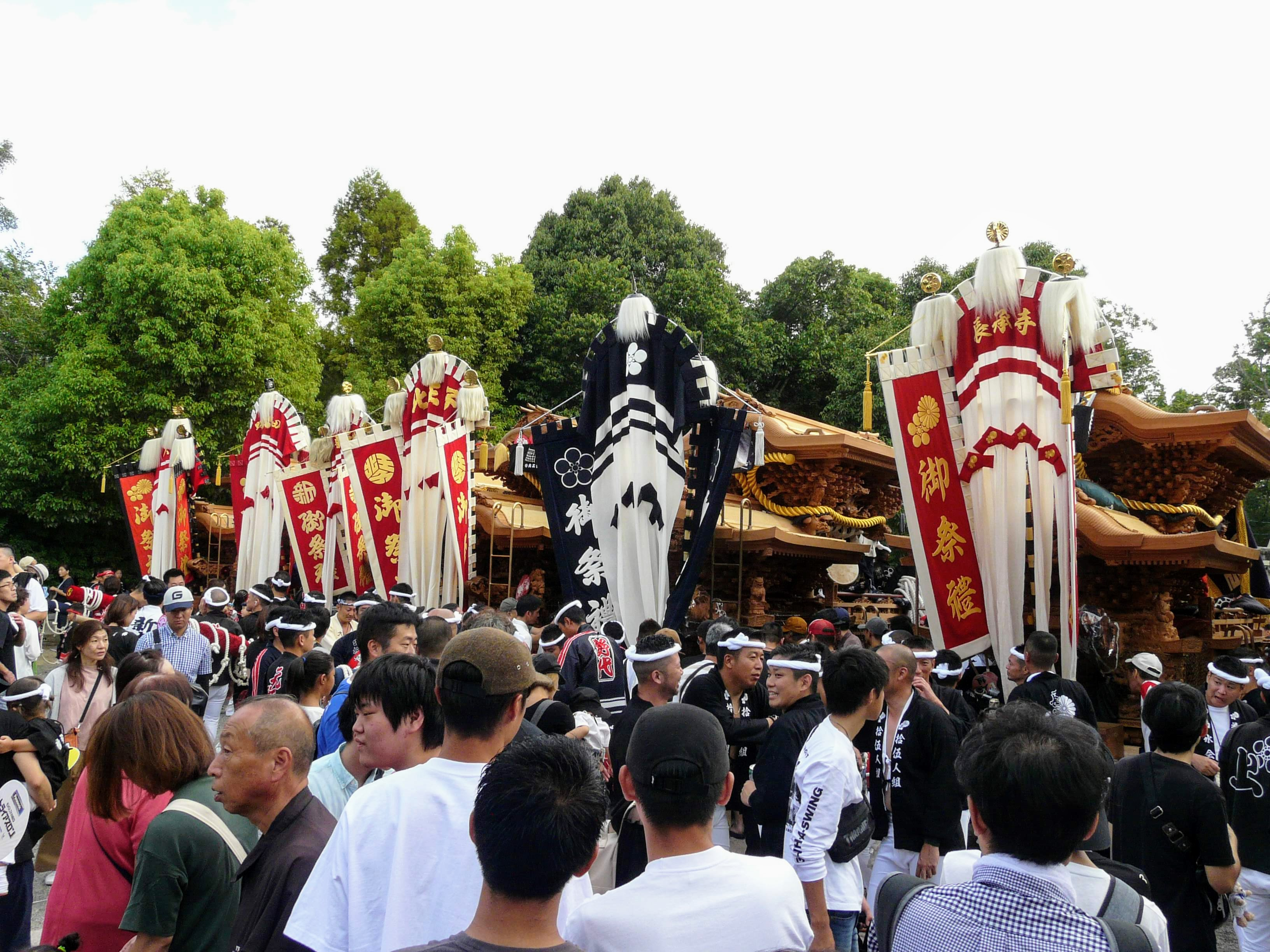
Videos of Danjiri Matsuri

== See also ==
- List of Shinto shrines
- Ichinomiya
