= Mikami Domain =

Japanese historical estate

Mikami Domain 三上藩
- Domain of Japan
- 1698–1871
- Capital: Mikami jin'ya
- Area
  - Coordinates: 35°03′06.22″N 136°01′48.51″E
  - Type: Daimyō
- Historical era: Edo period
  - Established: 1698
  - Disestablished: 1871
- Today part of: part of Shiga Prefecture

Mikami Domain (三上藩, Mikami-han) was a Fudai feudal domain under the Tokugawa shogunate of Edo period Japan. It was located in eastern Ōmi Province, in the Kansai region of central Honshu. The domain was centered at Mikami jin'ya, located in what is now the city of Yasu in Shiga Prefecture.

== History ==
The Endō clan ruled the 24,000 koku Gujō Domain in Mino Province from the start of the Tokugawa shogunate. On the death of Endō Tsuneharu, the retainers of the clan were divided by an O-Ie Sōdō over the succession, and when seven-year old Endō Tsuneharu died in 1693, the domain was dissolved due to attainder. However in light of the services the early Endō clan had given to Tokugawa Ieyasu, Shogun Tokugawa Tsunayoshi agreed to preserve the clan name, which was assigned to the eldest son of one of his hatamoto, Shirasu Tadayasu, who was married to the daughter of one of his concubines, Oden-no-kata. This son was assigned the name of "Endō Tanechika", and was raised by Toda Ujichika of Ogaki Domain. He was assigned an estate of 10,000 koku in Hitachi and Shimotsuke Provinces on reaching his maturity. In 1698, he was transferred to Ōmi Province. This marks the start of Mikami Domain.

The 5th daimyō, Endō Tanenori, served as wakadoshiyori and supervised the reconstruction of the Nishi-no-maru enclosure of Edo Castle, for which he was awarded an increase in kokudaka to 12,000 koku. In 1860, he received a promotion in status allowing him to build a castle in place of his jin'ya, although no castle was actually built. His successor and final daimyō, Endō Taneki, was Bugyō over the Kōbusho (shogunal military academy) from 1863 and participated in the First Chōshū expedition of 1864. Under Tokugawa Yoshinobu he was appointed a sōshaban and was in the shogun's inner circle. For this reason, the nascent Meiji government regarded him as an enemy, and in January 1868 deprived of his domain. However, he was pardoned in May 1868 and installed as Imperial governor of Mikami in June. On July 1, 1870, he relocated his seat to Yoshimi in Izumi Province and the domain was officially renamed Yoshimi Domain (吉見藩, Yoshimi-han) during the final months before the abolition of the han system,

== Bakumatsu period holdings ==
As with most domains in the han system, Mikami Domain consisted of a discontinuous territories calculated to provide the assigned kokudaka, based on periodic cadastral surveys and projected agricultural yields.

- Izumi Province
  - 8 villages in Izumi District
  - 4 villages in Hine District
- Ōmi Province
  - 3 villages in Kurita District
  - 2 villages in Yasu District
  - 3 villages in Kōka District

== List of daimyō ==
- Endō clan (Fudai) 1698-1871

	Name	Tenure	Courtesy title	Court Rank	kokudaka
1	Endō Tanechika (遠藤胤親)	1698–1733	Tajima-no-kami (但馬守)	Junior 5th Rank, Lower Grade (従五位下)	10,000 koku
2	Endō Tanenobu (遠藤胤将)	1733–1771	Bizen-no-kami (備前守)	Junior 5th Rank, Lower Grade (従五位下)	10,000 koku
3	Endō Tanetada (遠藤胤忠)	Shimotsuke-no-kami (下野守)	Junior 5th Rank, Lower Grade (従五位下)	10,000 koku	
4	Endō Tanetomi (遠藤胤富)	1790–1811	Sakon-shogen (左近将監)	Junior 5th Rank, Lower Grade (従五位下)	10,000 koku
5	Endō Tanenori (遠藤胤統)	1811–1863	Nakatsukasa-taifu (中務大輔)	Junior 5th Rank, Lower Grade (従五位下)	10,00 ->12,000 koku
6	Endō Taneki (遠藤胤城)	1863–1871	Tajima-no-kami (但馬守)	3rd Rank (三位)	12,000 ->14,500 koku

== See also ==
- List of Han
