= Koide Hidemasa =

Japanese Daimyo (1540–1604)

- 小出秀政

1st daimyō of Kishiwada Domain
- Reign: 1600 – April 21, 1604
- Successor: Koide Yoshimasa
- Born: Owari Province, Japan
- Died: April 21, 1604 (age 65)
- Burial: Honkoku-ji

Koide Hidemasa (小出 秀政; 1540 – April 21, 1604) was a Japanese Daimyo of the Azuchi-Momoyama period and Edo period.

== Biography ==
Hidemasa was born inside the Owari Province in 1540, as the child of one of the servants of Oda clan. He became the de-facto owner of Kishiwada Castle in July 1585 with 4,000 kokudaka, although he was considered a local magistrate at this period. He was given an additional 6000 koku worth of land in the Izumi Province in 1594. After Maeno Nagayasu lost power in 1595 due to Toyotomi Hidetsugu's seppuku after Hidetsugu was accused of plotting a rebellion, Hidemasa was given an additional 20,000 koku worth of land and became the official owner of the Kishiwada castle. After Toyotomi Hideyoshi's death in 1598, Hidemasa was ordered to support Toyotomi Hideyori and protect two gates in the Osaka Castle. After Hideyori moved from the Fushimi Castle to the Osaka Castle in 1599, it was decided that Hidemasa, along with Ishikawa Sadakiyo, Ishida Masazumi, Ishikawa Yoriaki, and Katagiri Katsumoto will be helpers of Hideyori. In January 1600, both Ishikawas and Ishida were removed from this position, leaving only two with this role left. Before the battle of Sekigahara, Hidemasa's second child, Hideie led 300 troops join the forces attacking Uesugi Kagekatsu. However, when Ishida Mitsunari rebelled, the rest of his children and Hidemasa himself sided Mitsunari. His children participated in the Siege of Tanabe and Siege of Ōtsu. After Mitsunari decisively lost the clash at Sekigahara, Hidemasa and their children was about to face severe punishments. However, all lands owned by the Koide clan were kept due to Hideie's siding with the Tokugawa clan in the battle of Sekigahara, with Hidemasa pardoned thanks to Hideyori. Hidemasa died at the age of 65 on April 21, 1604. His body was buried in Honkoku-ji, with the Kishiwada Domain he ruled succeeded by Yoshimasa, his first son.
