= Kishiwada Castle =

Building in Kishiwada City, Osaka Prefecture, Japan

- 岸和田城
- Kishiwada, Osaka, Japan
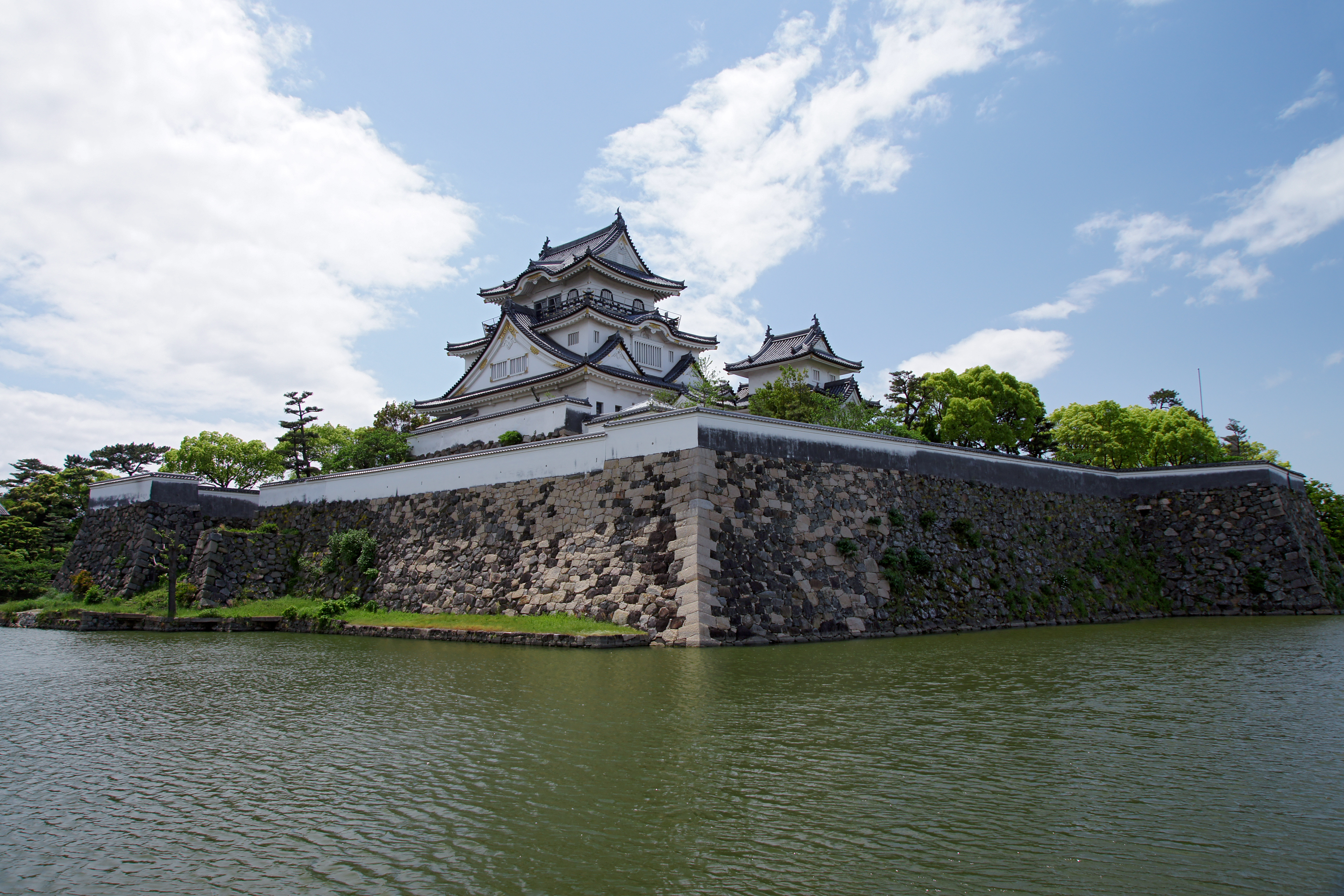
- Reconstructed tenshu of Kishiwada Castle

Site information
- Type: flatland-style Japanese castle
- Open to the public: yes
- Condition: partially reconstructed

Location
- Coordinates: 34°27′31.74″N 135°22′14.81″E

Site history
- In use: Edo period
- Demolished: 1871

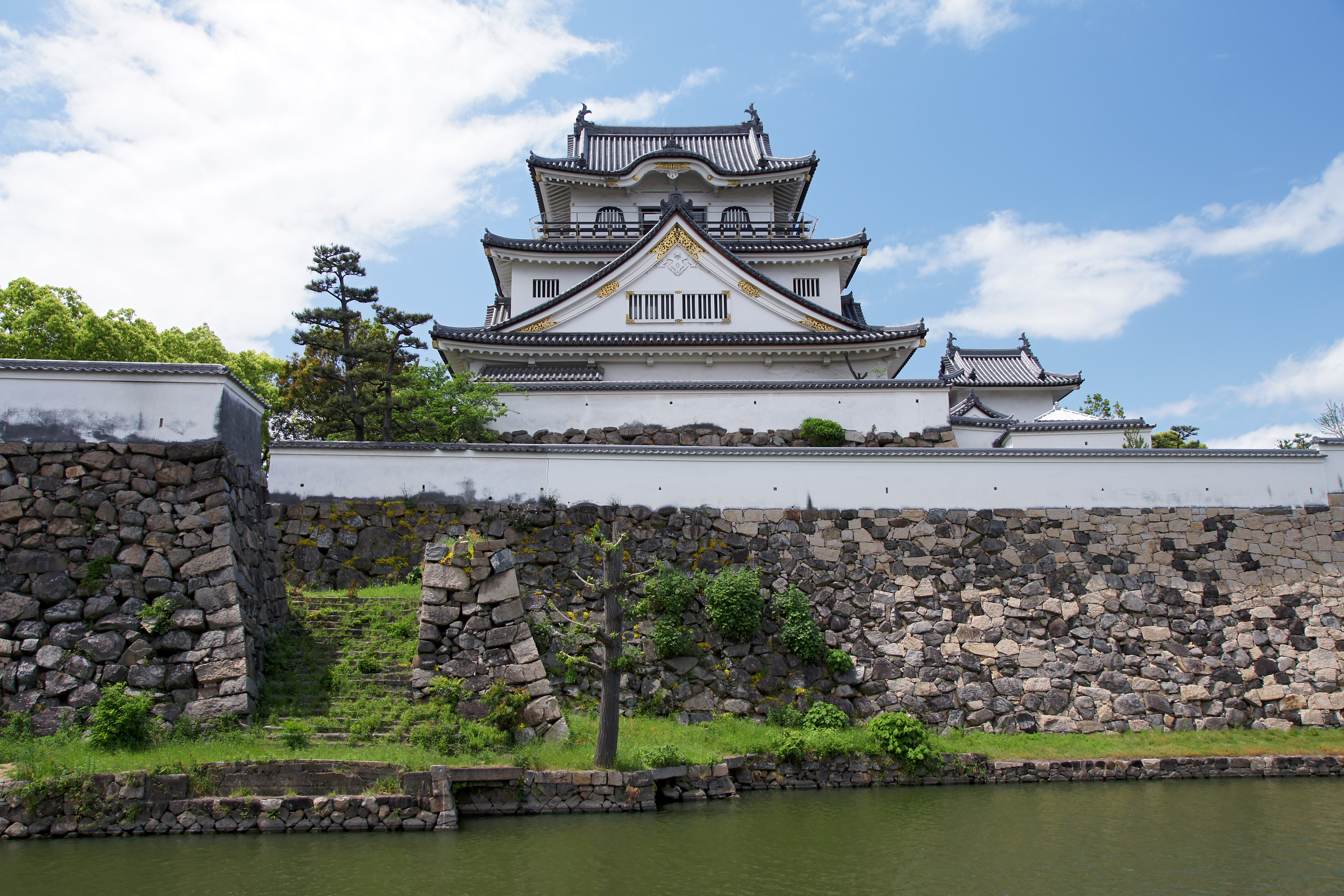
Tenshu of Kishiwada Castle

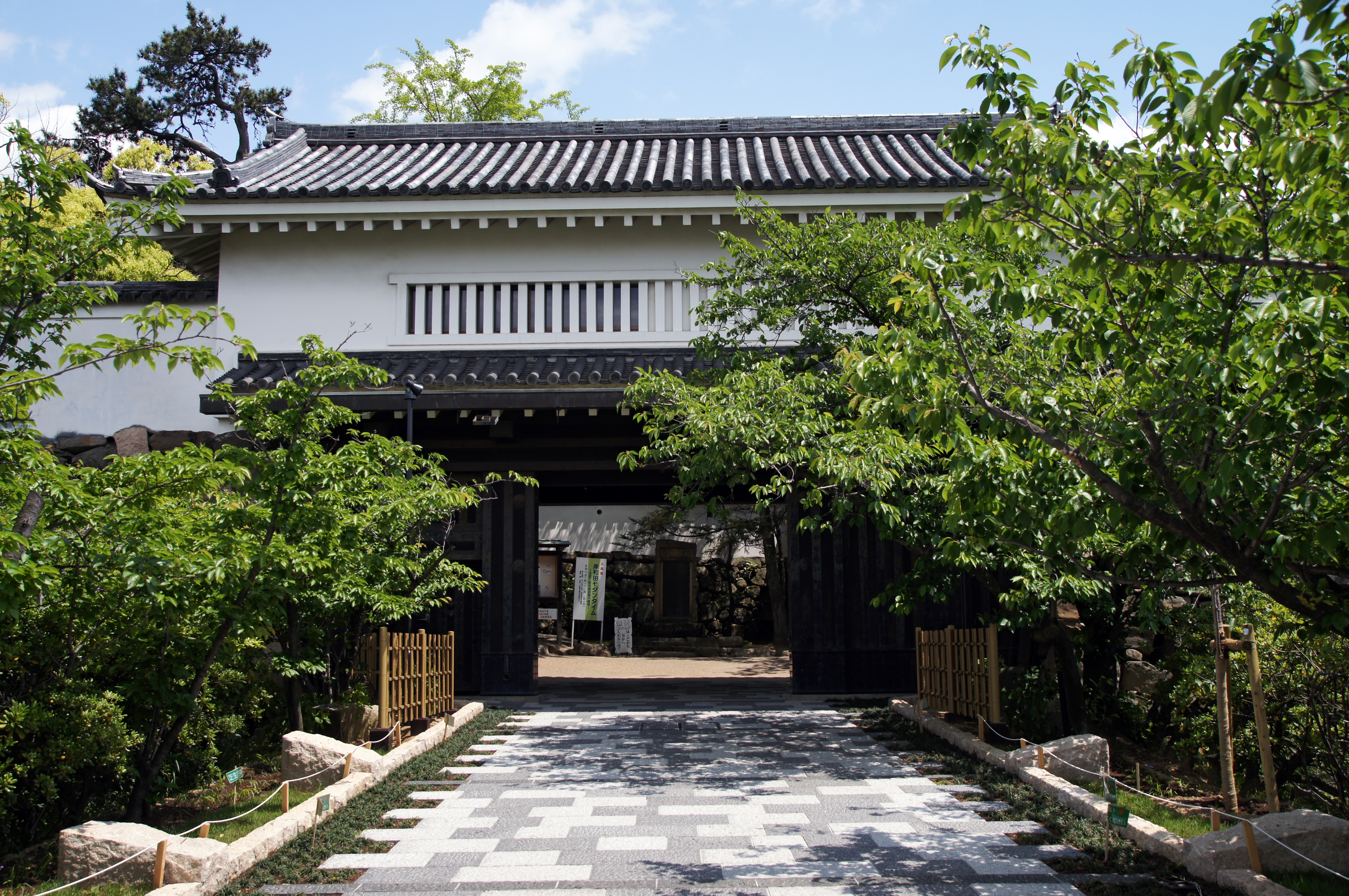
Gate of Honmaru (there were a total of 15 gates)

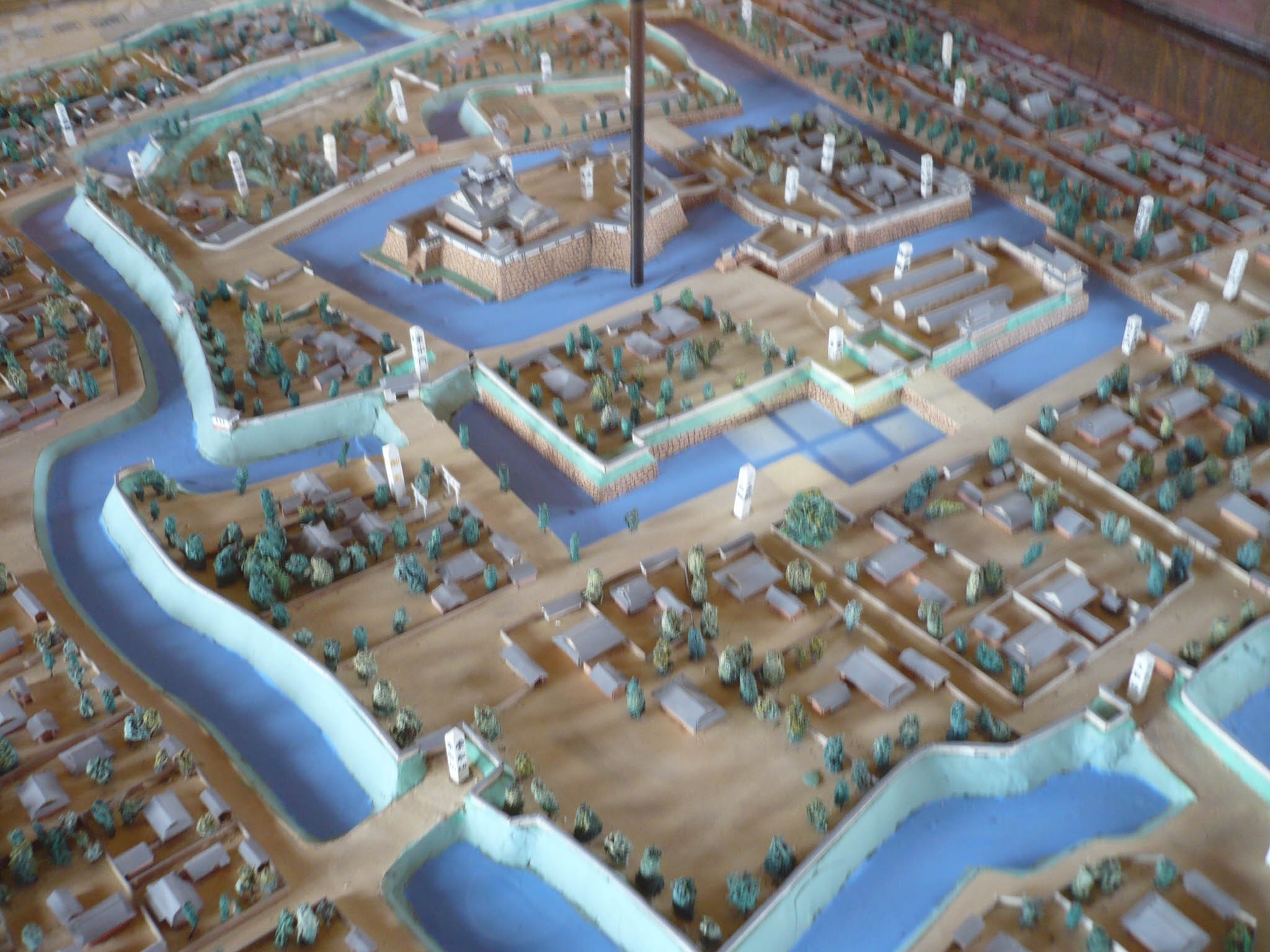
Reconstitution model of Kishiwada Castle

Kishiwada Castle (岸和田城, Kishiwada-jō) is a Japanese castle located in the city of Kishiwada, Osaka Prefecture, Japan. At the end of the Edo period, Kishiwada Castle was home to the Okabe clan, daimyō of Kishiwada Domain. The Honmaru Garden of the castle is designated as a National Place of Scenic Beauty. The castle is also known as Chikiri Castle (千亀利城, Chikiri-jō).

== Background ==
Kishiwada Castle is located in the center of the city of Kishiwada, facing Osaka Bay. The site is a very strategic location, approximately half way in-between the cities of Osaka and Wakayama and just south of the port of Sakai. It is located on the Kishū Kaidō, the main route connecting the capital area of Japan with Kii Province, and its coastal location was important for transportation from the eastern Shikoku to Settsu Province and Kyoto. It is unknown when this location was first fortified. During the Nanboku-chō period, a local warlord named Kishiwada Osamu was subordinate to Kusunoki Masashige at the Battle of Minatogawa in 1336 and is believed to have built a fortified residence approximately 500 meters southeast of the current castle. It later fell to the Ashikaga clan who appointed the Hosokawa clan as shugo of Izumi Province, and the Hosokawa appointed the Matsura clan as their deputies. At some unknown point, the castle was relocated to its present site on a small hill at the coastal terrace of Osaka Bay, protected to the north and south by rivers.

== History ==
In the early 15th century, the Miyoshi clan (from Awa Province) invaded and defeated the Hosokawa clan and their proxies, and became rulers over a large portion of the Kansai region. Miyoshi Yoshikata (1527-1562), the younger brother of Miyoshi Nagayoshi made Kishiwada Castle as his base and extensively rebuilt its fortifications. The Miyoshi also developed Sakai into an international port and profited greatly from trade. Miyoshi rule proved to be short-lived and by the 1560s the clan was in eclipse and Izumi Province had collapsed into a patchwork of local strongmen. It became a battleground between the forces of Oda Nobunaga and the followers of the Saiga Ikki, local followers of the Ikkō-ikki movement, who sought to overthrow the feudal system and establish a theocratic republic, and who had allied with his arch-enemy, Ishiyama Hongan-ji temple. Nobunaga seized Kishiwada Castle and placed Oda Nobuharu as castellan to protect against any attempt by the Saiga Ikki and the Ishiyama Hongan-ji armies from linking together. Nobunaga's fears were realized after his assassination in 1582. In 1584, Toyotomi Hideyoshi left the defenses of Osaka undermanned when he marched against Tokugawa Ieyasu to consolidate his position as Nobunaga's successor. In 1585 the Saiga Ikki armies took advantage of this vacuum to invade Izumi Province, but they were stopped by Hideyoshi's generals Matsuura Munekiyo with Nakamura Kazuuji with 8,000 men at the Battle of Kishiwada. Kishiwada Castle withstood the two-month siege, and was made the base of Hideyoshi's conquest of Kii Province. In order to secure the countryside and to continue to protect Sakai port and his rear flank towards Osaka, Hideyoshi placed his uncle, Koide Hidemasa as castellan and had Kishiwada's defenses strengthened.

Koide constructed a five-story tenshu in the central, or "Honmaru" bailey. This enclosure was roughly rectangular, 100 by 50 meters and was protected by stone walls and water moats. The secondary, or "Ni-no-maru" bailey extended in the direction of Osaka Bay, and also had tall stone walls protecting against attack from sea. Smaller enclosures surrounded by water moats protected these two main enclosures, which were connected by a narrow path, such that the castle had an "H" configuration, The total area of the castle was roughly 500 square meters, which was relatively small in relation to the size of its tenshu and its strategic importance.

In the Battle of Sekigahara, Koide Hidemasa and his eldest son Koida Yoshimasa were with the defeated Western Army. However, Koide hedged his bets by having his second son, Koide Hideie, side with the Eastern Army, and as a result, Koide Hideie inherited the Kishiwada Domain under the newly established Tokugawa Shogunate. He was transferred to Izushi Domain in Tajima Province in 1619 and replaced by Matsudaira Yasushige, making Kishiwada a Fudai fiefdom. He was transferred in 1640 and the castle was given to the Okabe clan, who would rule Kishiwada until the Meiji restoration. In 1623, a yagura tower was relocated to Ninomaru Bailey from Fushimi Castle.

In 1827, the tenshu was burnt down by lightning and not replaced, Following the Meiji restoration, all remaining buildings at Kishiwada Castle were destroyed. The Honmaru and Ninomaru baileys were preserved as a park, and in 1954, a three-story faux-tenshu was constructed for use as a local museum. A gate and a few yagura were also reconstructed in 1969. The stone walls and moats of the castle remain in relatively good condition. The castle is a ten-minute walk from Nankai Honsen line Takojizo Station on the Nankai Main Line or a 15-minute walk from Kishiwada Station.

Kishiwada Castle was listed as one of the Continued 100 Fine Castles of Japan in 2017.

== In media ==
It was one of the filming locations of Snake Eyes (2021 film).

== See also ==
- List of Places of Scenic Beauty of Japan (Osaka)

== Literature ==
- De Lange, William (2021). An Encyclopedia of Japanese Castles. Groningen: Toyo Press. pp. 600 pages. ISBN 978-9492722300.
- Schmorleitz, Morton S. (1974). Castles in Japan. Tokyo: Charles E. Tuttle Co. pp. 144–145. ISBN 0-8048-1102-4.
- Motoo, Hinago (1986). Japanese Castles. Tokyo: Kodansha. p. 200 pages. ISBN 0-87011-766-1.
- Mitchelhill, Jennifer (2004). Castles of the Samurai: Power and Beauty. Tokyo: Kodansha. p. 112 pages. ISBN 4-7700-2954-3.
- Turnbull, Stephen (2003). Japanese Castles 1540-1640. Osprey Publishing. p. 64 pages. ISBN 1-84176-429-9.
