= Tōdō Takahisa =

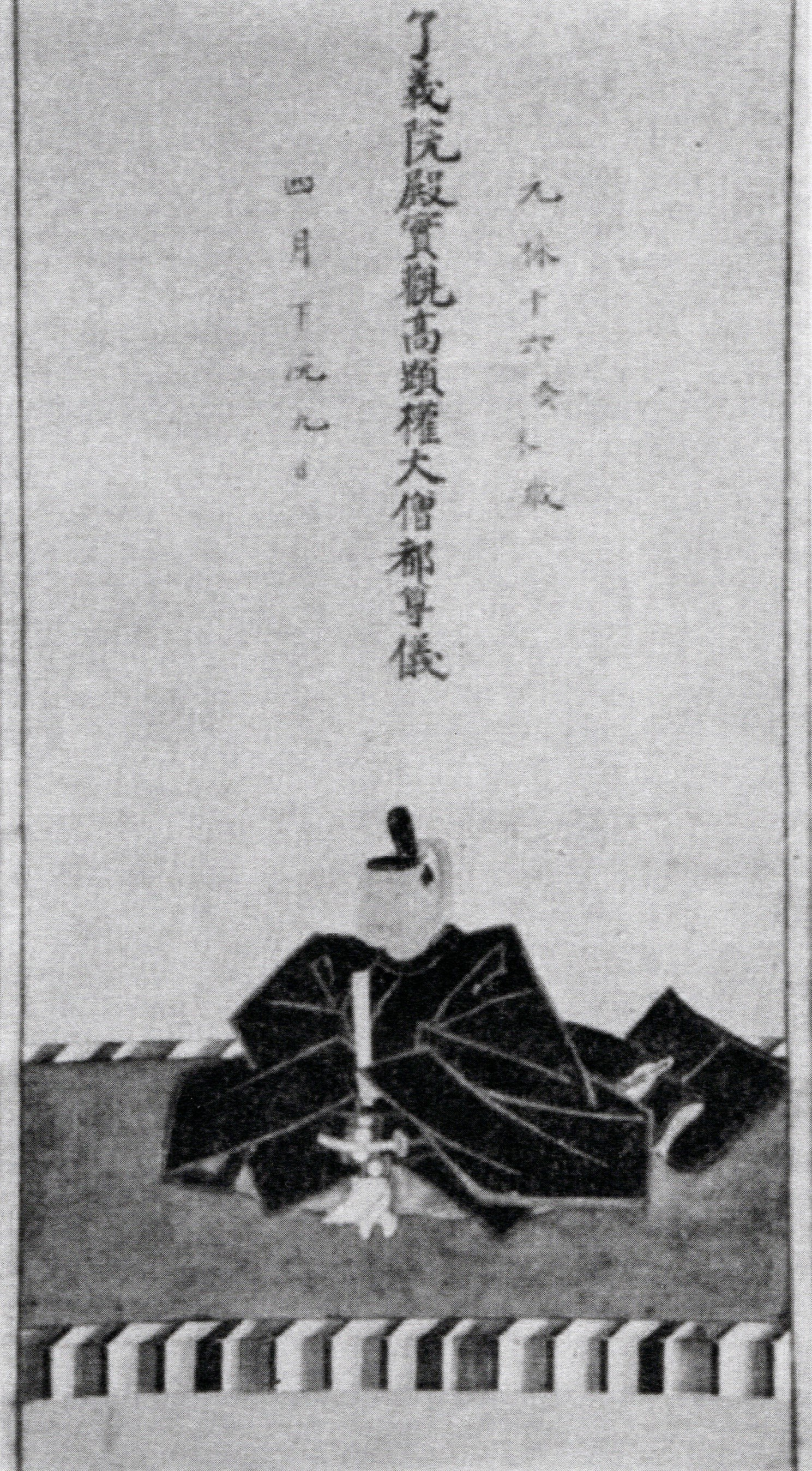

Daimyō of Tsu
- In office 1669–1703
- Preceded by: Tōdō Takatsugu
- Succeeded by: Tōdō Takachika

Personal details
- Born: March 1, 1638
- Died: June 13, 1703 (aged 65)

Tōdō Takahisa (藤堂高久; March 11, 1638 – June 13, 1703) was a Japanese daimyō of the early Edo period. He was the 3rd daimyō from the Tōdō clan to rule Tsu Domain in Ise and Iga Provinces.

== Biography ==
Takahisa was the eldest son of Tōdō Takatsugu, the 2nd daimyo of Tsu Domain. In 1669, he became daimyo upon his father's retirement. Takahisa initially was popular for implementing many of the economic reforms begun by the previous administration, including large-scale irrigation works and the development of new rice lands. However, his ban on mining of clay around Shiratoyama effectively destroyed the ceramics industry in Iga Province, and caused many potters to leave his domain for nearby Shigaraki in Ōmi Province.

Takahisa was married to the daughter of the tairō Sakai Tadakiyo, who fell from favor in 1680 and who died under sudden circumstances in 1681. To avoid political troubles, Takahisa quickly associated himself with Shōgun Tokugawa Tsunayoshi's favorite, Yanagisawa Yoshiyasu, to the extent that he was derided by his peers as "Yanagisawa's footmat". However, when Yanagisawa attempted to force the childless Takahisa to adopt his younger son as heir, the suicides of a number of his senior retainers prevented this from occurring. Instead, the domain went to Takahisa's younger brother, Tōdō Takachika on his death in 1703.

Preceded by Tōdō Takatsugu	Daimyō of Tsu; 1669–1703	Succeeded by Tōdō Takachika
