= Tōdō Takachika =

Japanese daimyō of the early Edo period

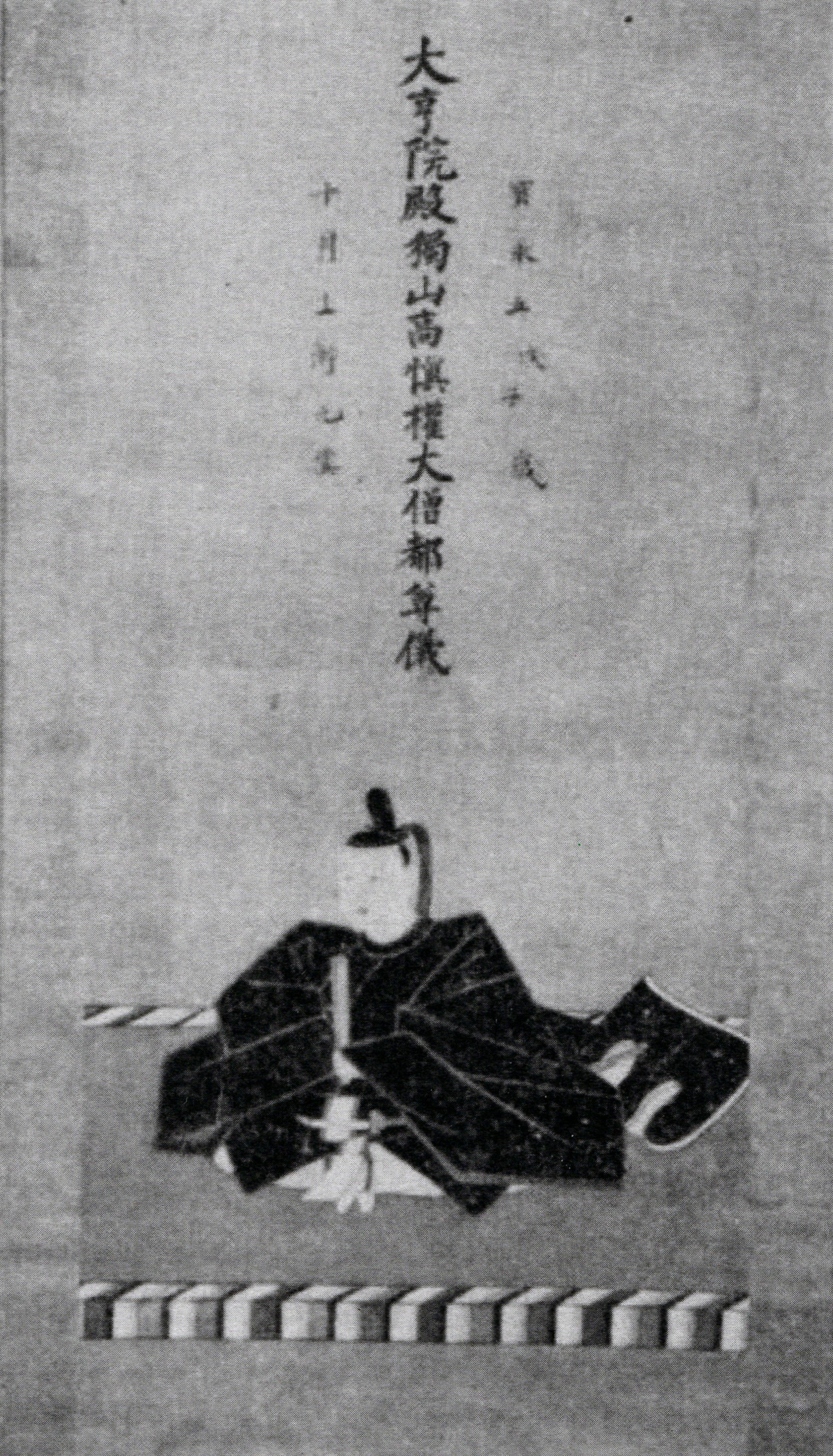

Daimyō of Tsu
- In office 1703–1708
- Preceded by: Tōdō Takahisa
- Succeeded by: Tōdō Takatoshi

Personal details
- Born: March 28, 1667
- Died: November 20, 1708 (aged 41)

Tōdō Takachika (藤堂高睦; March 28, 1667 – November 20, 1708) was a Japanese daimyō of the early Edo period. He was the 4th daimyō from the Tōdō clan to rule Tsu Domain in Ise and Iga Provinces.

== Biography ==
Takachika was the younger brother of Tōdō Takahisa, the 3rd daimyō of Tsu Domain. In 1703, he became daimyo upon the death of his elder brother. During his short reign, the domain suffered greatly from damaged caused by the 1703 Genroku earthquake, during which the clan's Edo residence was destroyed. The subsequent 1707 Hōei earthquake also caused massive damage in the clan's territories in Ise Province.

Takachika had two sons and one daughter, all of his children predeceased him. On his death in 1708, Tōdō Takatoshi, from the branch line of the clan at Hisai Domain was adopted as his heir and successor.

Preceded by Tōdō Takahisa	Daimyō of Tsu; 1703–1708	Succeeded by Tōdō Takatoshi
