= Kishiwada Domain =

Kishiwada Domain 岸和田藩
- under Tokugawa shogunate Japan
- 1585–1871
- Capital: Kishiwada Castle
- Area
  - Coordinates: 34°27′31.74″N 135°22′14.81″E
  - Type: Daimyō
- Historical era: Edo period
  - Established: 1585
  - Koide clan: 1601
  - Matsui-Matsudaira clan: 1619
  - Okabe clan: 1640
  - Disestablished: 1871
- Today part of: part of Osaka Prefecture

Location of Kishiwada Castle
Kishiwada Domain (Japan)

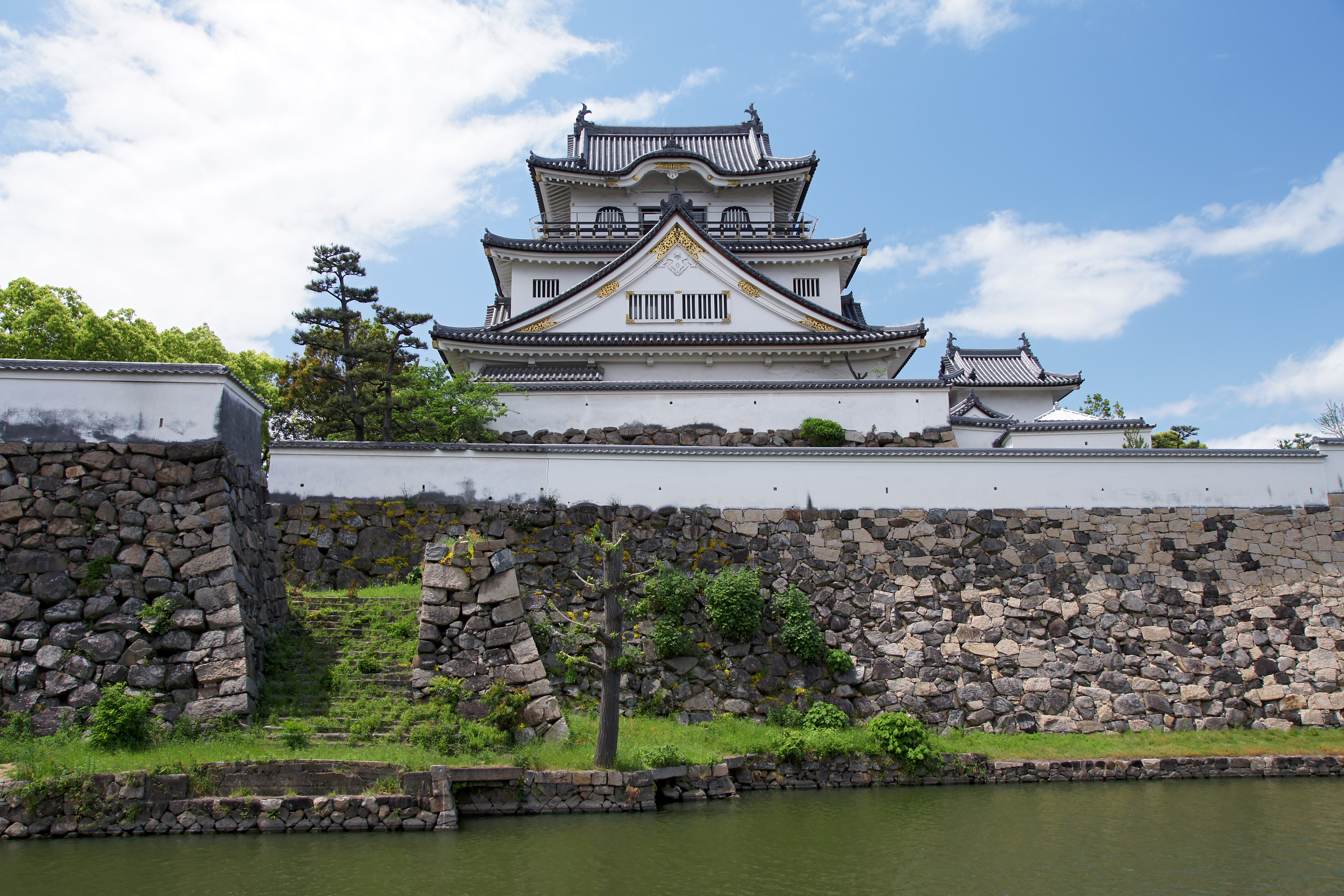
Kishiwada Castle

Kishiwada Domain (岸和田藩, Kishiwada-han) was a feudal domain under the Tokugawa shogunate of Edo period Japan, located in Izumi Province in what is now the southern portion of modern-day Osaka Prefecture. It was centered around Kishiwada Castle and was controlled by the fudai daimyō Okabe clan throughout much of its history.

== History ==
Kishiwada Domain was founded in 1585, when Toyotomi Hideyoshi installed his maternal uncle, Koide Hidemasa as castellan of Kishiwada Castle. At first, he was allotted a kokudaka of only 4,000 koku, but this was increased to 10,000 koku in 1594 and 30,000 koku in 1595. In the Battle of Sekigahara, Koide Hidemasa and his eldest son Koida Yoshimasa were with the defeated Western Army loyal to the Toyotomi clan. However, Koide hedged his bets by having his second son, Koide Hideie, side with the Eastern Army under Tokugawa Ieyasu, and as a result, Koide Hideie inherited the domain in 1601 under the new Tokugawa shogunate and received an increase to 50,000 koku in 1613. He was transferred to Izushi Domain in Tajima Province in 1619.

The Koide were replaced by Matsudaira Yasushige, formerly of Shinoyama Domain in Tamba Province. As he was from the Matsui-Matsudaira clan, the domain changed from a tozama to a fudai domain at this time. As the lands of Kishiwada Domain were very fertile and flat, and due to advances in rice cultivation, Matsunaga petitioned the shogunate to raise his official kokudaka from 50,000 to 60,000 koku. In 1640, his son Matsudaira Yasuteru used this extra kokudaka to provide a 5000 koku hatamoto holding for his nephew Yasuaki and 3000 and 2000 koku holdings for his younger brothers Yasunori and Yasunori. However, the same year, he was transferred to Yamasaki Domain in Harima Province.

The domain was then awarded to Okabe Nobukatsu, Matsudaira Yasuteru's father-in-law, who was transferred from Takatsuki Domain in Settsu Province. The domain would remain in the hands of the Okabe clan until the Meiji restoration. Okabe Nobukatsu's first task was to take steps to avoid a peasant revolt, created by the extra taxes which had been imposed due to Matsudaira Yasushige's increase in kokudaka. He also renovated Kishiwada Castle and sponsored the repair or construction of many shrines and temples.

In 1661, his son and successor Okabe Yukitaka gave 5000 koku to his younger brother Takanari and 2,000 koku to his brother Toyoake. This reduced the domain from 60,000 koku to 53,000 koku. During the tenure of the 3rd daimyō Okabe Nagayasu, the Kishiwada Danjiri Matsuri festival was established at Kishiwada in celebration of a good harvest and then installation of a branch of the Fushimi Inari Taisha from Kyoto to the Sannomaru of Kishiwada Castle. The 4th daimyō Okabe Nagataka reformed the clan's military system and established a military training school from 1722.

As the domain had significant sources of income from sugar cane cultivation and the production of cotton and cotton cloth in addition to its rice cultivation, the domain survived the 1675 famine and 1707 Hōei earthquake without much difficulties; however, the clan's finances began to deteriorate and despite efforts by successive daimyō at reforms, the domain entered the Bakumatsu period without noticeable improvement in its fiscal position. During the 1837 Oshio Heihachiro Rebellion, troops from Kishiwada were called upon to protect Osaka Castle. The 11th daimyō Okabe Nagayuki, opened the han school in 1852, and this was expanded under his successor, Okabe Nagahiro in 1866. The samurai of the domain were divided into pro-shogunate and pro-sonnō jōi factions; however, with the start of the Boshin War the domain sided with the new Meiji government. In 1871, the domain became Kishiwada Prefecture with the abolition of the han system, and subsequently was merged into Sakai Prefecture and then Osaka Prefecture.

The final daimyō of Kishiwada, Okabe Nagatomo served in key positions in the Meiji government, including Secretary-General of the House of Peers Deputy Foreign Minister, Minister of Justice, Governor of Tokyo, member of the Privy Council. He received the kazoku peerage title of Viscount in 1884.

== Holdings at the end of the Edo period ==
As with most domains in the han system, Kishiwada Domain consisted of several discontinuous territories calculated to provide the assigned kokudaka, based on periodic cadastral surveys and projected agricultural yields.

- Izumi Province
  - 3 villages in Ōtori District
  - 2 villages in Izumi District
  - 55 villages in Minami District
  - 40 villages in Hine District

== List of daimyō ==
#	Name	Tenure	Courtesy title	Court Rank	kokudaka
Koide clan, 1601-1619 (Tozama)
1	Koide Hidemasa (小出秀政)	1601 - 1604	Harima-no-kami (播磨守)	Junior 5th Rank, Lower Grade (従五位下)	30,000 koku
2	Koide Yoshimasa (小出吉政)	1604 - 1613	Yamato-no-kami (大和守)	Junior 5th Rank, Lower Grade (従五位下)	30,000 koku
3	Koide Yoshihide (小出吉英)	1613 - 1619	Yamato-no-kami (大和守)	Junior 5th Rank, Lower Grade (従五位下)	30,000 -> 50,000 koku
Matsui-Matsudaira clan, 1619-1640 (fudai)
1	Matsudaira Yasushige (松平康重)	1619 - 1640	Suo-no-kami (周防守)	Junior 4th Rank, Lower Grade (従四位下)	50,000-> 60,000 koku
2	Matsudaira Yasuteru (松平康映)	1640 - 1640	Suo-no-kami (周防守)	Junior 5th Rank, Lower Grade (従五位下)	60,000-> 50,000 koku
Okabe clan, 1640-1871 (fudai)
1	Okabe Nobukatsu (岡部宣勝)	1640 - 1661	Mino-no-kami (美濃守)	Junior 5th Rank, Lower Grade (従五位下)	60,000 koku
2	Okabe Yukitaka (岡部行隆)	1661 - 1686	Naizen-no-kami (内膳正)	Junior 4th Rank, Lower Grade (従四位下)	60,000 -> 53,000 koku
3	Okabe Nagayasu (岡部長泰)	1686 - 1721	Mino-no-kami (美濃守)	Junior 5th Rank, Lower Grade (従五位下)	53,000 koku
4	Okabe Nagataka (岡部長敬)	1721 - 1724	Naizen-no-kami (内膳正)	Junior 5th Rank, Lower Grade (従五位下)	53,000 koku
5	Okabe Nagaakira (岡部長著)	1724 - 1756	Mino-no-kami (美濃守)	Junior 5th Rank, Lower Grade (従五位下)	53,000 koku
6	Okabe Nagasumi (岡部長住)	1756 - 1772	Naizen-no-kami (内膳正)	Junior 5th Rank, Lower Grade (従五位下)	53,000 koku
7	Okabe Naganao (岡部長修)	1772 - 1776	Suruga-no-kami (駿河守)	Junior 5th Rank, Lower Grade (従五位下)	53,000 koku
8	Okabe Nagatomo (岡部長備)	1776 - 1803	Mino-no-kami (美濃守)	Junior 5th Rank, Lower Grade (従五位下)	53,000 koku
9	Okabe Nagachika (岡部長慎)	1803 - 1833	Mino-no-kami (美濃守)	Junior 5th Rank, Lower Grade (従五位下)	53,000 koku
10	Okabe Nagayori (岡部長和)	1833 - 1850	Naizen-no-kami (内膳正)	Junior 5th Rank, Lower Grade (従五位下)	53,000 koku
11	Okabe Nagayuki (岡部長発)	1850 - 1855	Mino-no-kami (美濃守)	Junior 5th Rank, Lower Grade (従五位下)	53,000 koku
12	Okabe Nagahiro (岡部長寛)	1855 - 1868	Chikuzen-no-kami (筑前守)	Senior 4th Rank (正五位)	53,000 koku
13	Okabe Nagamoto (岡部長職)	1868 - 1871	-none-	Senior 2nd Rank, Lower Grade (正二位)	53,000 koku

== See also ==
- List of Han
- Abolition of the han system
