= Tōdō Takatsugu =

Daimyō of Tsu
- In office 1632–1669
- Preceded by: Tōdō Takatora
- Succeeded by: Tōdō Takahisa

Personal details
- Born: January 4, 1602
- Died: December 20, 1676 (aged 74)

Tōdō Takatsugu (藤堂 高次; January 4, 1602 – December 20, 1676) was a Japanese daimyō of the early Edo period. He was the 2nd daimyō from the Tōdō clan to rule Tsu Domain in Ise and Iga Provinces.

== Biography ==
As the daimyō of Tsu Domain, Tōdō Takatora had no son and heir, he adopted the son of Niwa Nagahide, whom he gave the name of Tōdō Takayoshi. However, at the age of 46, Takatora unexpectedly produced a legitimate son, Takatsugu, who became 2nd daimyō of Tsu domain on his father's death in 1632. The displaced Takayoshi was sent to a branch of the clan in Imabari, on Shikoku island, but was recalled by Takatsugu to head the main branch of the Todo clan in Ise Province in 1636.

In 1632, the Todo clan was tasked by the Tokugawa shogunate with the rebuilding of the Second Bailey on Edo Castle. This was followed by the rebuilding of the Main Bailey on Edo Castle after a fire in 1639, and with the construction of the mausoleum for Shōgun Tokugawa Iemitsu at Nikkō Tōshō-gū in 1652. To add to the clan's woes, their castle town of Tsu burned down in a great fire in 1654. These extensive outlays effectively bankrupted the clan, despite efforts to increase revenues by the development of new rice lands and various fiscal reforms. The difficult financial situation of the domain would remain a problem throughout its history.

In 1669, Takatsugu officially retired from his posts in favor of his eldest son, Tōdō Takahisa. He died in 1676.

Preceded by Tōdō Takatora	Daimyō of Tsu; 1632–1669	Succeeded by Tōdō Takahisa
