= Imabari Domain =

Administrative division in Japan during the Edo period (1600–1871)

Imabari Domain 今治藩
- Domain of Japan
- 1636–1871
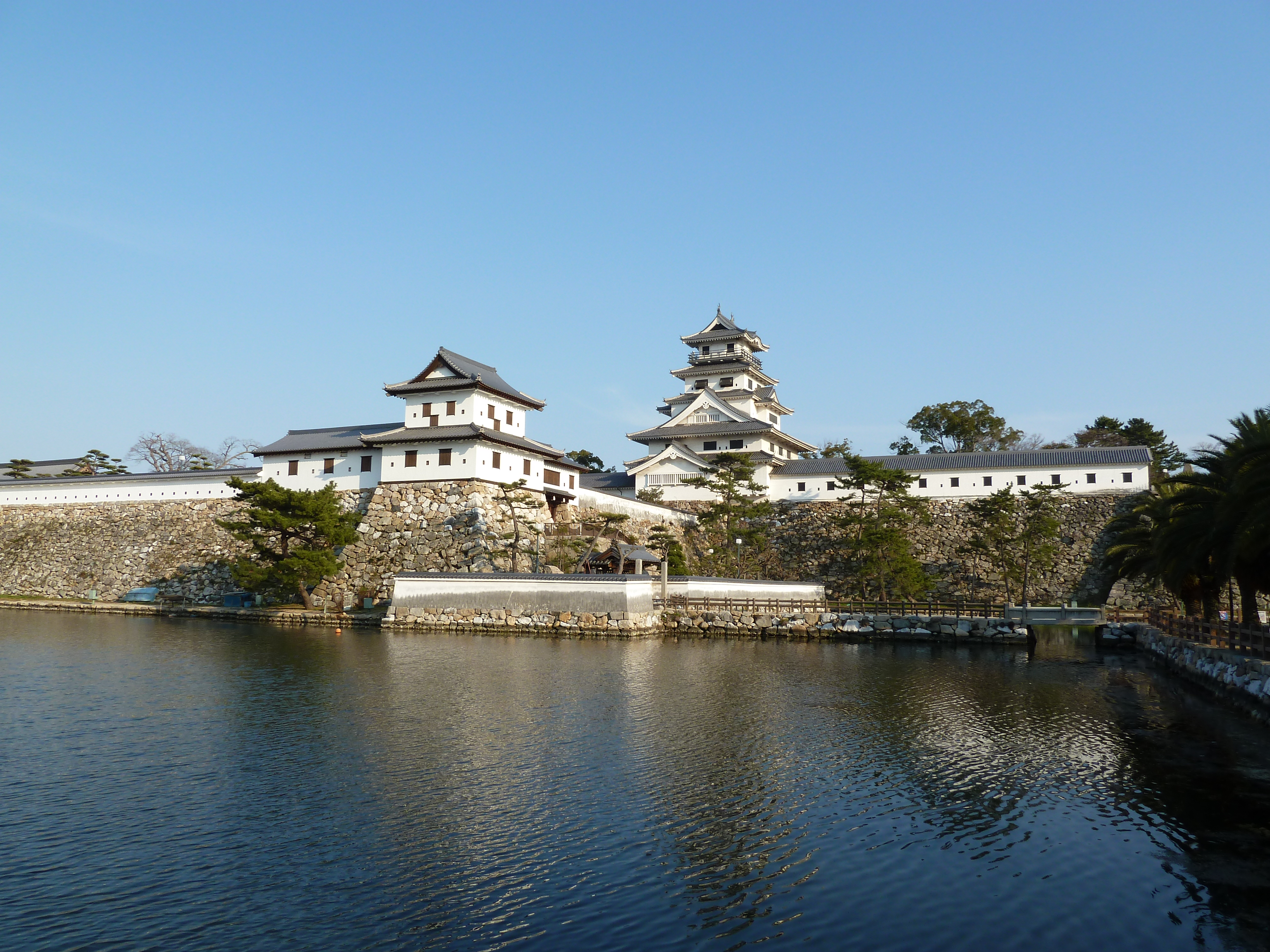
- Imabari Castle

- Mon of the Hisamatsu-Matsudaira clan
- Capital: Imabari Castle
- Area
  - Coordinates: 34°3′48.01″N 133°0′24.5″E
- Historical era: Edo period
  - Established: 1636
  - Abolition of the han system: 1871
- Contained within
  - Province: Iyo
- Today part of: Ehime Prefecture

Location of Imabari Castle
Imabari Domain (Japan)

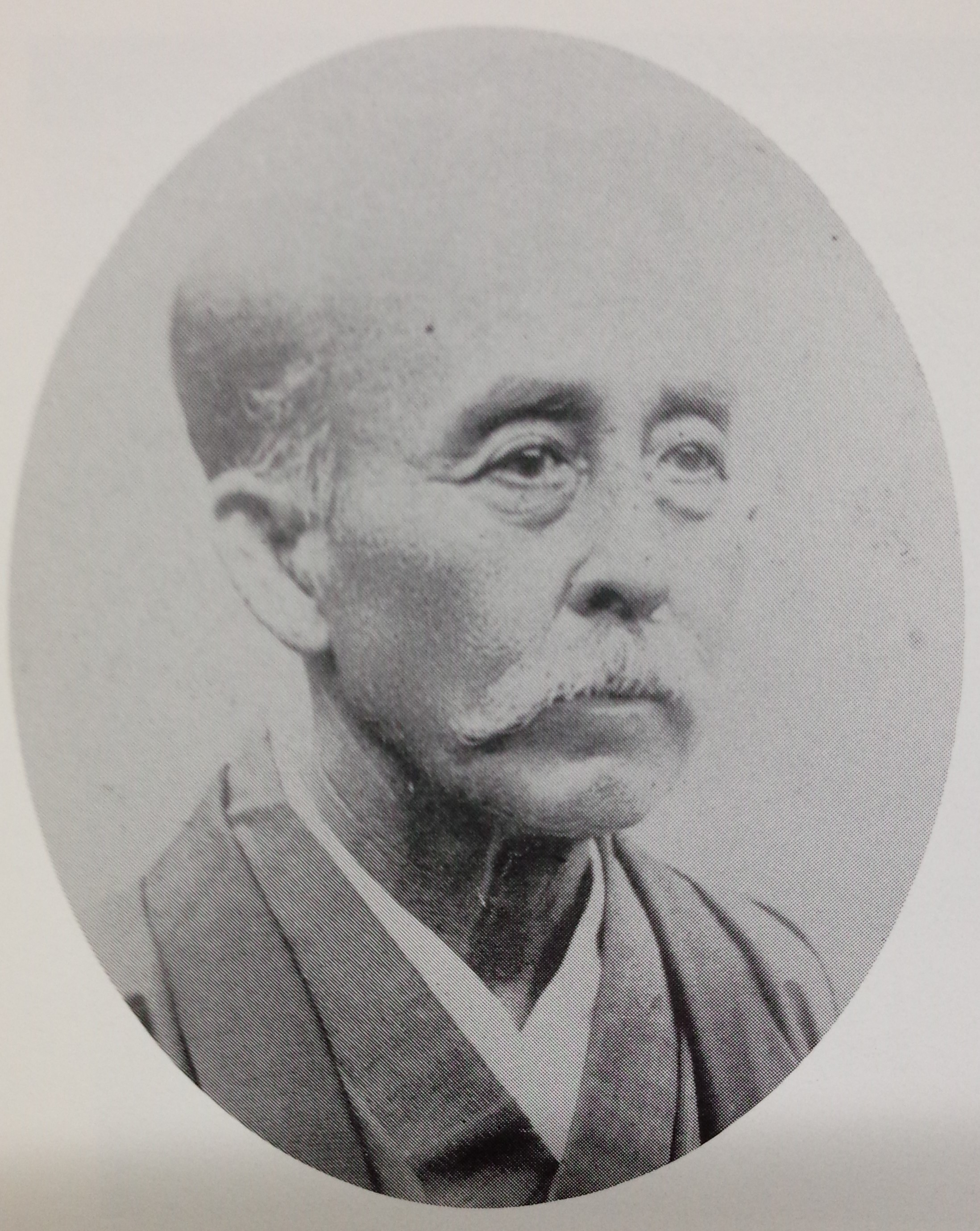
Matsudaira Sadanori

Imabari Domain (今治藩, Imabari-han) was a feudal domain under the Tokugawa shogunate of Edo period Japan, in what is now eastern Ehime Prefecture on the island of Shikoku. It was centered around Imabari Castle in what is now the city of Imabari, Ehime, and was ruled throughout most of its history by a cadet branch of the Hisamatsu-Matsudaira clan. Imabari Domain was dissolved in the abolition of the han system in 1871 and is now part of Ehime Prefecture.

== History ==
In 1600, Tōdō Takatora, daimyō of Uwajima Domain received an increase in kokudaka to 200,000 koku for his services in the Battle of Sekigahara and relocated his seat to Kokubunyama Castle in Imabari and established Imabari Domain. However, since Kokubunyama Castle is a medieval mountain castle, it was an inconvenient location to build a castle town, so in 1602, construction of a modern castle was started, and Imabari Castle was completed a year later. In 1608, he was transferred to Tsu Domain with control over the two provinces of Ise and Iga, leaving is adopted son Tōdō Takayoshi as lord of a 20,000 koku remnant of the domain centered at Imabari Castle. Tōdō Takayoshi was transferred to Nabari in Iga Province in 1635. In the same year, the Tokugawa shogunate transferred Matsudaira Sadayuki form Kuwana Domain to Iyo-Matsuyama Domain, and raised his younger brother Matsudaira Sadafusa from 7,000 koku at Ise Nagashima Castle to 30,000 koku as daimyō of Imabari. In 1665, Sadafusa was appointed to the position of castellan of Edo Castle, for which he received an additional 10,000 koku from Musashi, Shimōsa, and Hitachi Provinces as a his stipend, raising his total to 40,000 koku.

Sadatoki left 5000 koku in the Kantō region in his will to his younger brother, reducing the kokudaka of Imabari Domain to 35,000 koku. In 1698, 5,000 koku of land in Kantō was exchanged for 5,000 koku in Uma District. The industries that supported the clan's finances include salt, cotton, and sweet potatoes as domain monopolies. In 1805, the 7th daimyō, Matsudaira Sadayoshi, set up "Kōshoba", the predecessor of the han school. In 1807, the "Kōshoba" was expanded and changed its name to "Katsumeikan".

In 1863, during the Bakumatsu period, the 10th daimyō, Matsudaira Sadanori, reformed the domain military with Western style firearms and built an artillery battery on the coast. He also tried to a mediate between the shogunate and the Sonnō jōi loyalists, and stayed in Kyoto for a long time. During the Second Chōshū expedition in 1865, he determined the situation of the shogunate was hopeless, and decided to side with to the Imperial Court. In the Battle of Toba-Fushimi in 1868, he quickly sent troops to Kyoto and guarded the Kyoto Imperial Palace. In the subsequent battles of the Boshin War, the clan served with the Meiji government army. This was a very different stance from Iyo-Matsuyama Domain, which continued its support of the shogunate.

In 1868, Matsudaira Sadanori renounced the Matsudaira name and styled himself "Hisamatsu Sadanori". In 1871, Imabari Domain became "Imabari Prefecture" due to the abolition of the han system and establishment of prefectures. After that, it was incorporated into Ehime Prefecture via Matsuyama Prefecture and Sekitetsu Prefecture. In 1884, Hisamatsu Sadnori became a viscount in the kazoku peerage.

== Holdings at the end of the Edo period ==
As with most domains in the han system, Imabari Domain consisted of several discontinuous territories calculated to provide the assigned kokudaka, based on periodic cadastral surveys and projected agricultural yields.

- Iyo Province
  - 19 villages in Uma District
  - 81 villages in Ochi District

== List of daimyō ==
#	Name	Tenure	Courtesy title	Court Rank	kokudaka
Tōdō clan, 1600–1608 (Tozama)
1	Tōdō Takatora (藤堂高虎)	1600–1608	Sakon-e-no-shōshō (左近衛権少将), Sado-no-kami (佐渡守)	Junior 4th Rank, Lower Grade (従四位下)	200,000 koku
tenryō 1608–1635
Hisamatsu-Matsudaira clan, 1635–1871 (Fudai)
1	Matsudaira Sadafusa (松平定房)	1635–1674	Mimasaku-no-kami (美作守); Jijū (侍従)	Junior 4th Rank, Lower Grade (従四位下)	30,000->40,000 koku
2	Matsudaira Sadatoki (松平定時)	1674–1676	Mimasaku-no-kami (美作守)	Junior 5th Rank, Lower Grade (従五位下)	40,000 koku
3	Matsudaira Sadanobu (松平定陳)	1676–1702	Suruga-no-kami (駿河守)	Junior 5th Rank, Lower Grade (従五位下)	35,000 koku
4	Matsudaira Sadamoto (松平定基)	1702–1732	Mimasaku-no-kami (美作守)	Junior 5th Rank, Lower Grade (従五位下)	35,000 koku
5	Matsudaira Sadasato (松平定郷)	1732–1763	Chikugo-no-kami (筑後守)	Junior 5th Rank, Lower Grade (従五位下)	35,000 koku
6	Matsudaira Sadayasu (松平定休)	1763–1790	Naizen-no-kami (内膳正)	Junior 5th Rank, Lower Grade (従五位下)	35,000 koku
7	Matsudaira Sadayoshi (松平定剛)	1790–1824	Iki-no-kami (壱岐守)	Junior 5th Rank, Lower Grade (従五位下)	35,000 koku
8	Matsudaira Sadashige (松平定芝)	1824–1837	Wakasa-no-kami (若狭守)	Junior 5th Rank, Lower Grade (従五位下)	35,000 koku
9	Matsudaira Katsumichi (松平勝道)	1837–1862	Wakasa-no-kami (若狭守)	Junior 5th Rank, Lower Grade (従五位下)	35,000 koku
10	Matsudaira Sadanobu (松平定法)	1862–1871	Iki-no-kami (壱岐守)	Junior 5th Rank, Lower Grade (従五位下)	35,000 koku

== See also ==
- List of Han
- Abolition of the han system
