= Tsu Castle =

Castle in Mie Prefecture, Japan

Coordinates: 34°43′3.96″N 136°30′27.57″E

- 津城
- Tsu, Mie Prefecture, Japan
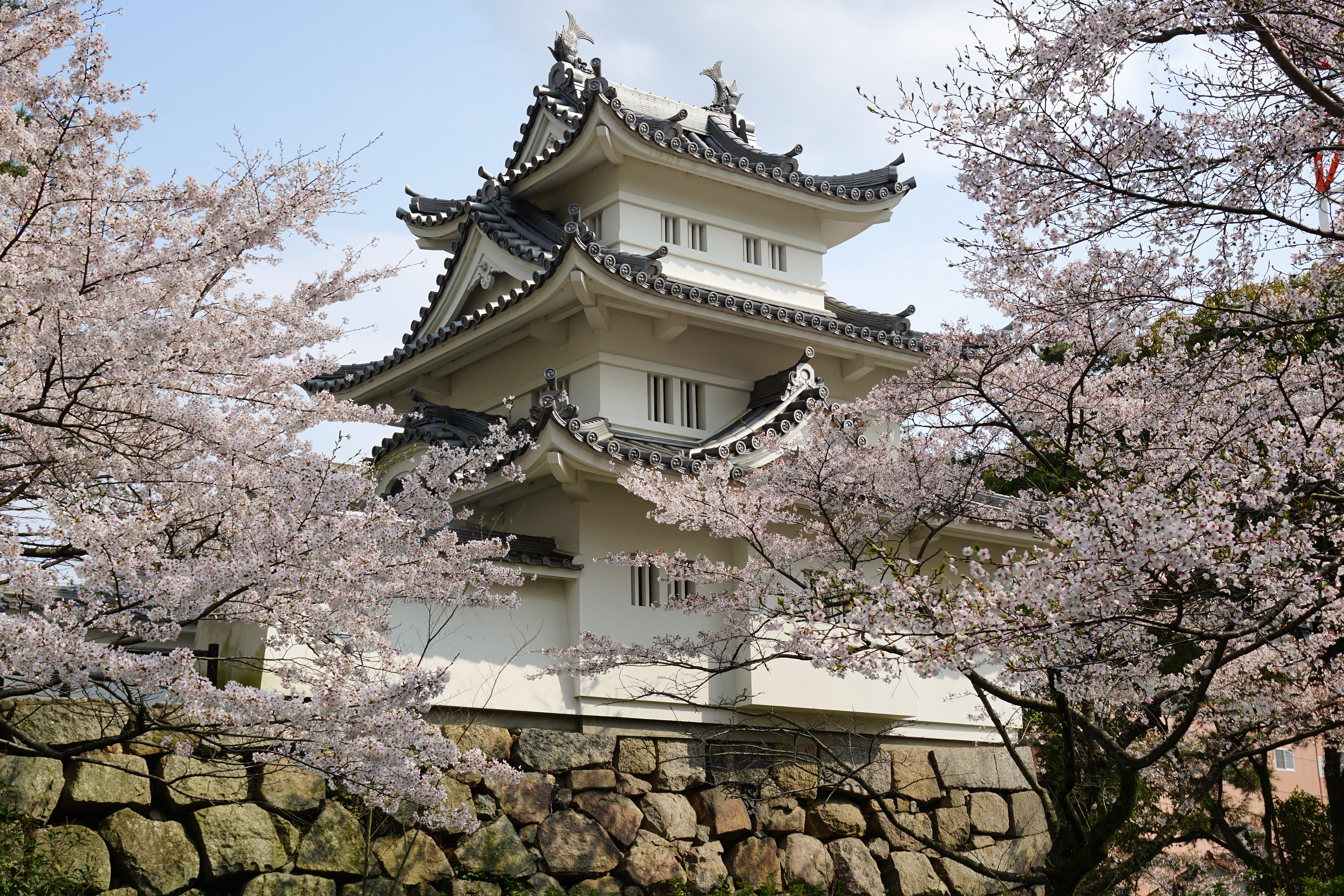
- Reconstructed Yagura of Tsu Castle

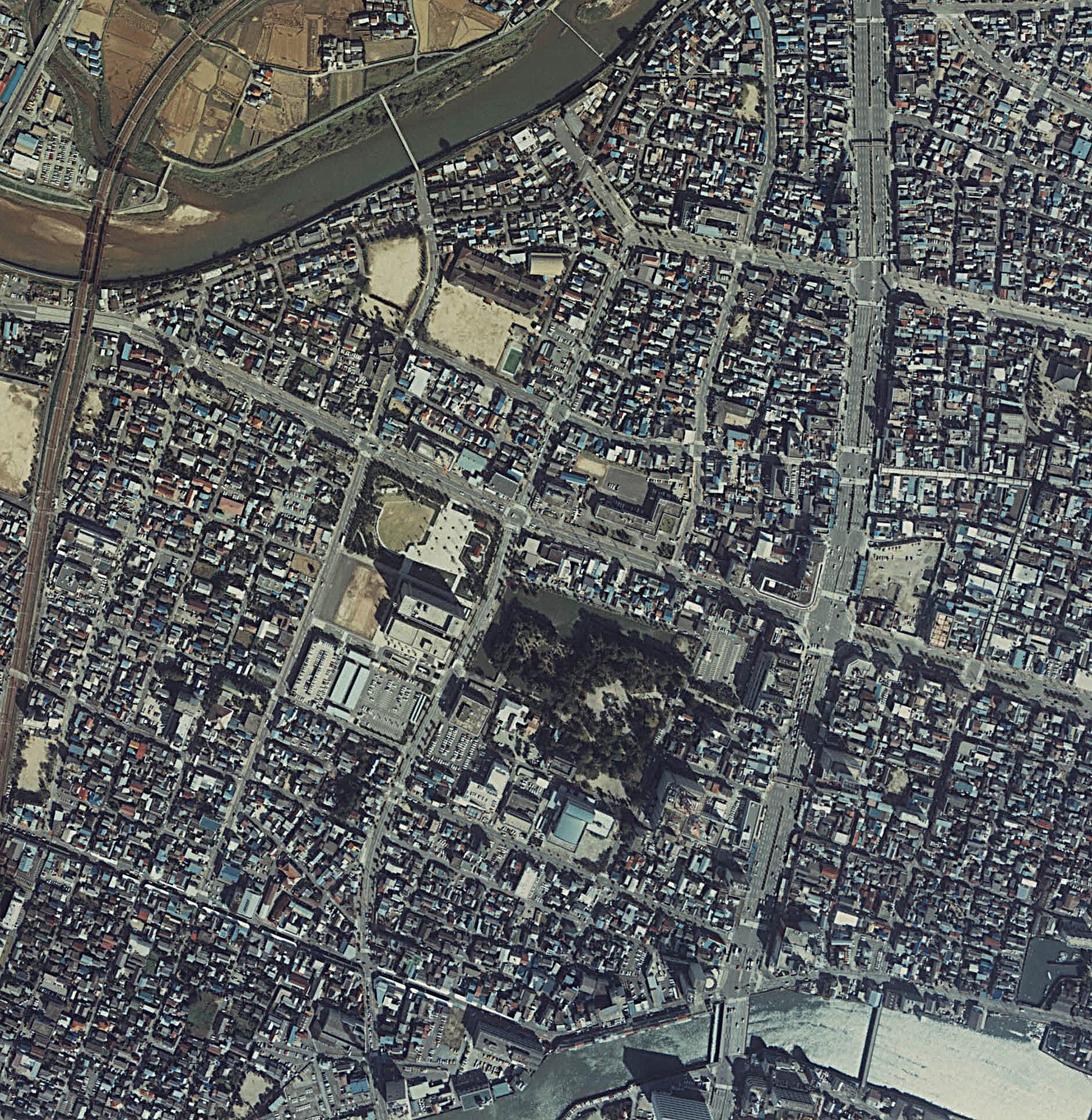
- Tsu Castle from the air

Site information
- Type: flatland-style Japanese castle
- Condition: Reconstructed 1958

Location

Site history
- Built: 1558, major reconstruction in 1608
- Built by: Hosono Fujiatsu; Tōdō Takatora
- In use: Sengoku period-1889

Tsu Castle (津城, Tsu-jō) was a Japanese castle located in the city of Tsu, Mie Prefecture, Japan. During the Edo period, Tsu Castle was home to the Sudo clan, daimyō of Tsu Domain, who dominated the provinces of Ise and Iga under the Tokugawa shogunate. The castle was also known as "Anotsu-jō" (安濃津城) after the ancient name for Tsu. The castle ruins are a Prefectural Historic Site.

== Overview ==
During the Sengoku period, in 1558, Hosono Fujiatsu built a castle at the conjunction of the Ano and Iwata rivers, using the rivers as natural moats. The port of Anotsu had been an important port for the coastal trade along the eastern coast of Japan; however, after its destruction by an earthquake at the end of the 15th century, it was gradually eclipsed by the ports of Kuwana and Matsusaka instead.

Oda Nobunaga took control of the castle in 1568 and ordered his younger brother Oda Nobukane to reside there in 1577 to consolidate Oda control over the Ise region. Under Oda Nobukane, the castle was greatly expanded in size, with the completion of the primary, secondary and third baileys, a five-story tenshu and secondary tenshu. Under Toyotomi Hideyoshi, Nobukane was transferred to Tanba Province, and the castle was given to Hideyoshi’s retainer, Tomita Nobuhiro in 1595 along with a 50,000 koku domain.

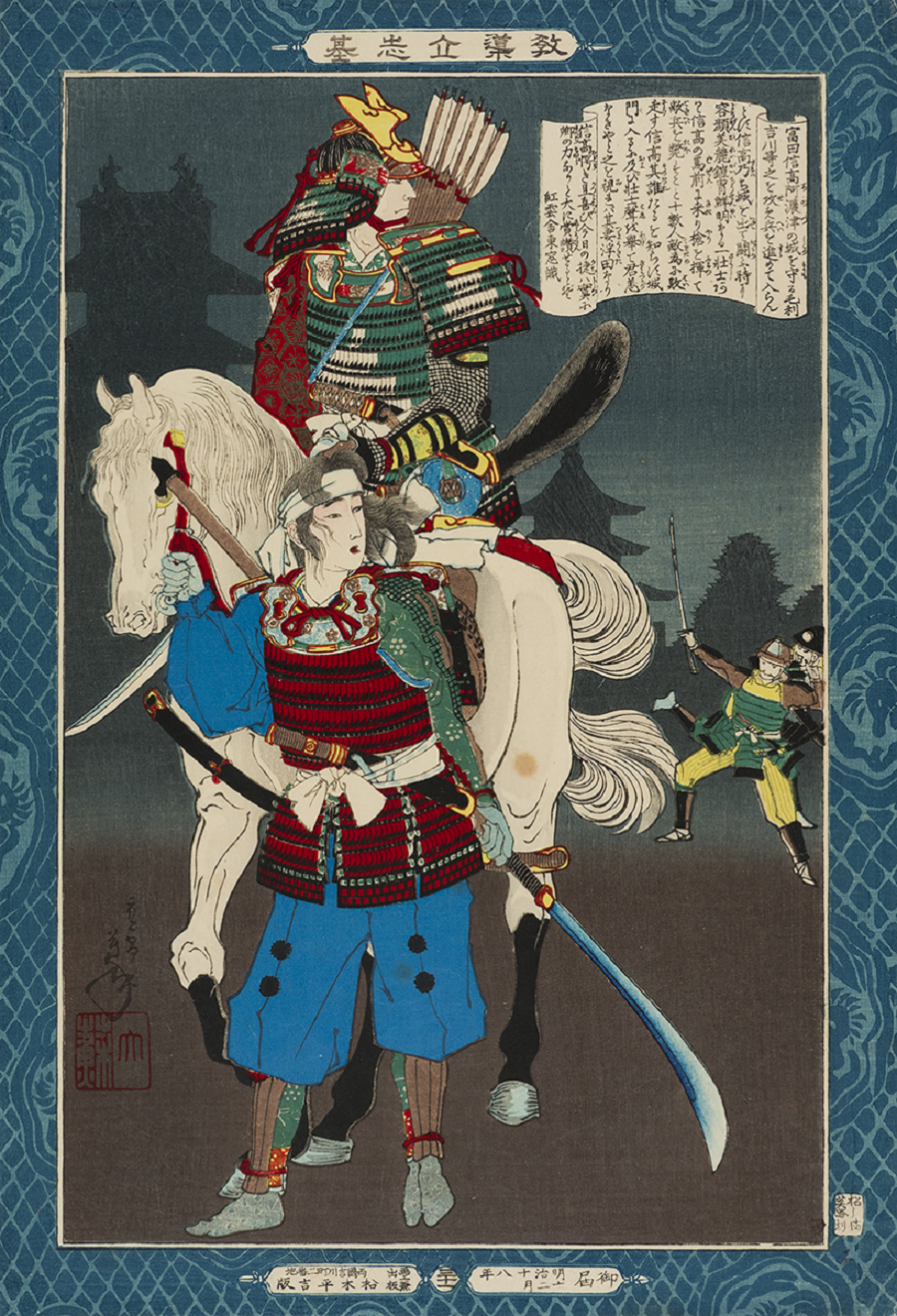
Yuki no kata and Tomita Nobutaka, defending Tsu castle during the Sekigahara campaign.

However, during the Battle of Sekigahara in 1600, the Tomita clan sided with the eastern forces under Tokugawa Ieyasu and Tsu Castle was attacked by the western armies under Mōri Terumoto and Chōsokabe Morichika. Although the 1300 defenders put up a stiff defense, the 30,000 attackers largely burned the castle down around them. Tomita Nobutaka and his wife, Yuki no Kata, successfully defended the castle. The Tomita were rewarded for their loyalty by the Tokugawa shogunate and were given an increase in kokudaka and rebuilt parts of the castle by the time they were transferred to Uwajima Domain in Iyo Province in 1608.

The Tomita were replaced by the Tōdō clan, who ruled as daimyō over the 220,000 koku Tsu Domain until the Meiji Restoration. Tōdō Takatora, who was a noted castle architect, renovated Tsu Castle with a three-story and a two-story tenshu, rejuvenated the castle town, and increased the clan’s revenues to 323,000 koku.Tōdō Takatora had worked on numerous castles previous to this one, including Edo Castle, Nagoya Castle, Zeze Castle and others. After the tenshu was destroyed in a fire in 1662, the Tokugawa shogunate did not grant permission for it to be rebuilt, and it was replaced by a two-story yagura.

With the start of the Boshin War, Tsu Domain initially attempted to remain neutral; however, after the Battle of Toba Fushimi, the domain defected to the Satchō Alliance and attacking the retreating shogunate forces. This contributed greatly to the imperial victory, and greatly demoralized the Tokugawa forces who were shocked at Tsu Domain's sudden defection. The forces of Tsu Domain served in the vanguard of the imperial advance down the Tōkaidō. After the Meiji restoration as per decrees by the new Meiji government, the remaining structures of Tsu Castle were dismantled in 1873. The outer moats were filled, and only a portion of the inner moat remains. The site of the Honmaru (Inner Bailey) and Ni-no-Maru (Second Bailey) of the castle came under the control of the Imperial Japanese Army, but it was demilitarized and sold back to former lord Tōdō Takakiyo in 1889. The castle site subsequently became a city park.

Some of the original stone walls have survived. One corner yagura was reconstructed in 1958. However, it is not a historically accurate reconstruction, and contains various features copied from other structures to make it more visually appealing. The gate to the Japanese garden now located within the Inner Bailey is a survival from the Edo period han school of the domain.

Tsu Castle was listed as one of the Continued Top 100 Japanese Castles in 2017.

The castle is located a 15-minute walk from Tsu-shimmachi Station on the Kintetsu Nagoya Line.

== Gallery ==
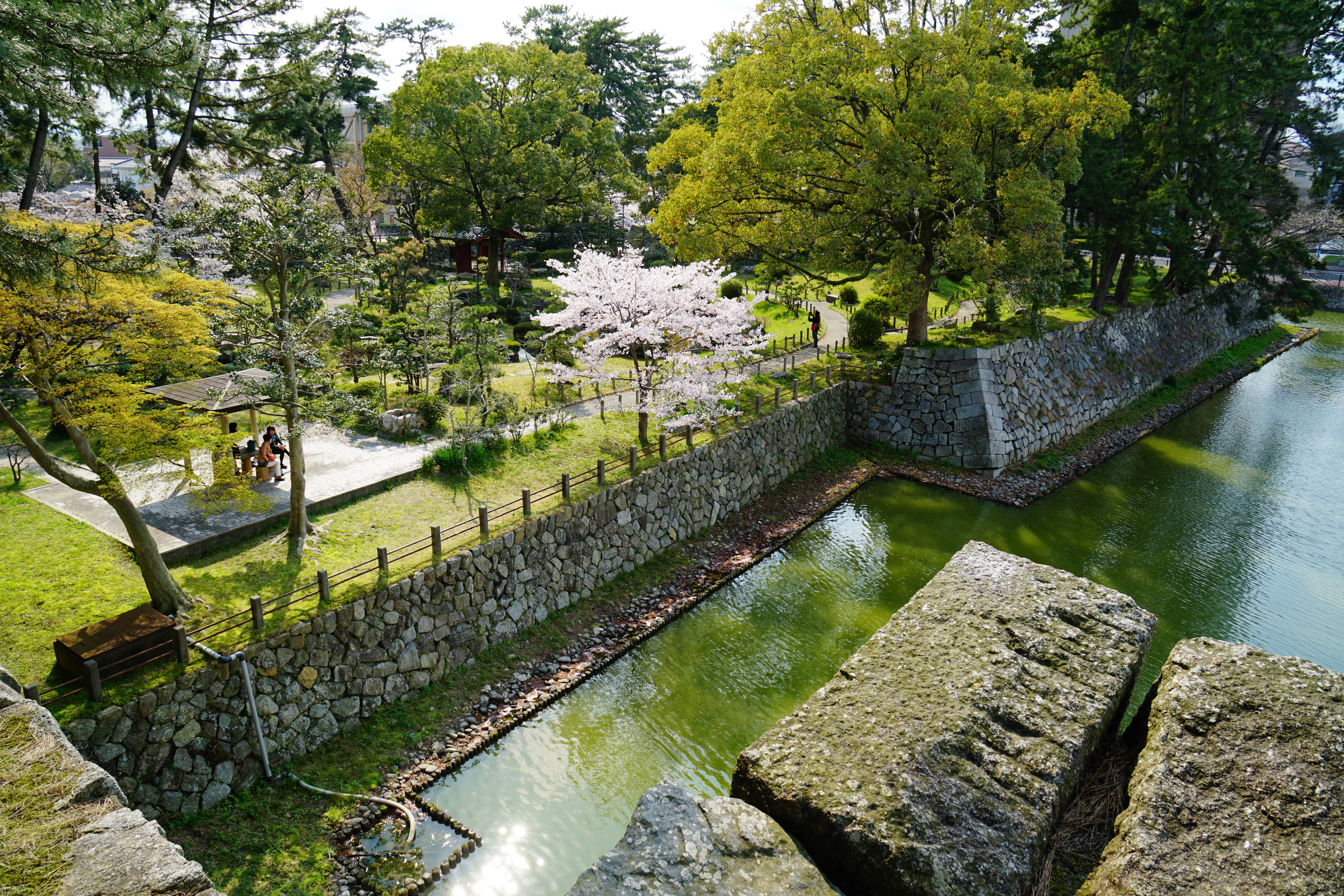
Moats

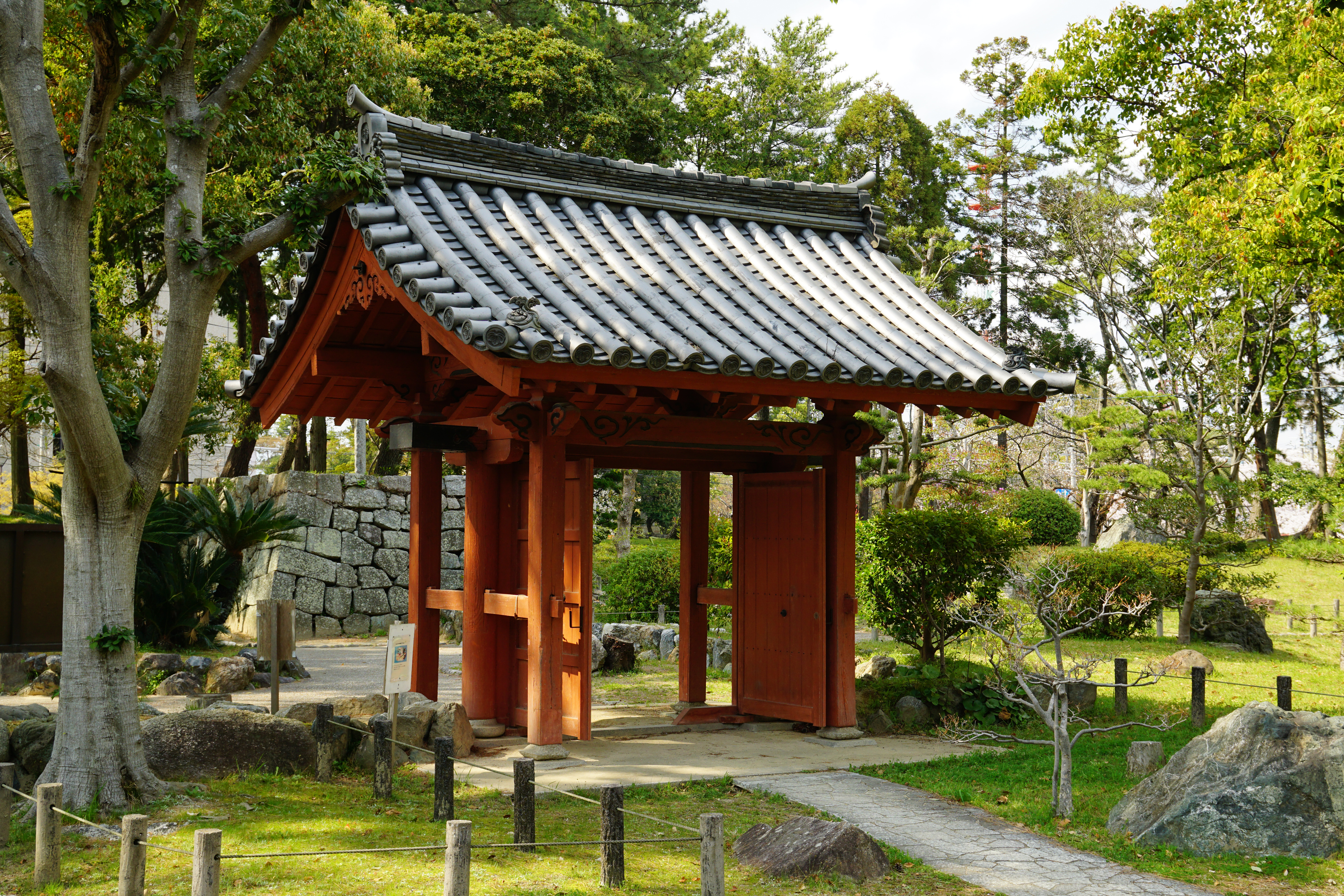
Gate from the former Han school

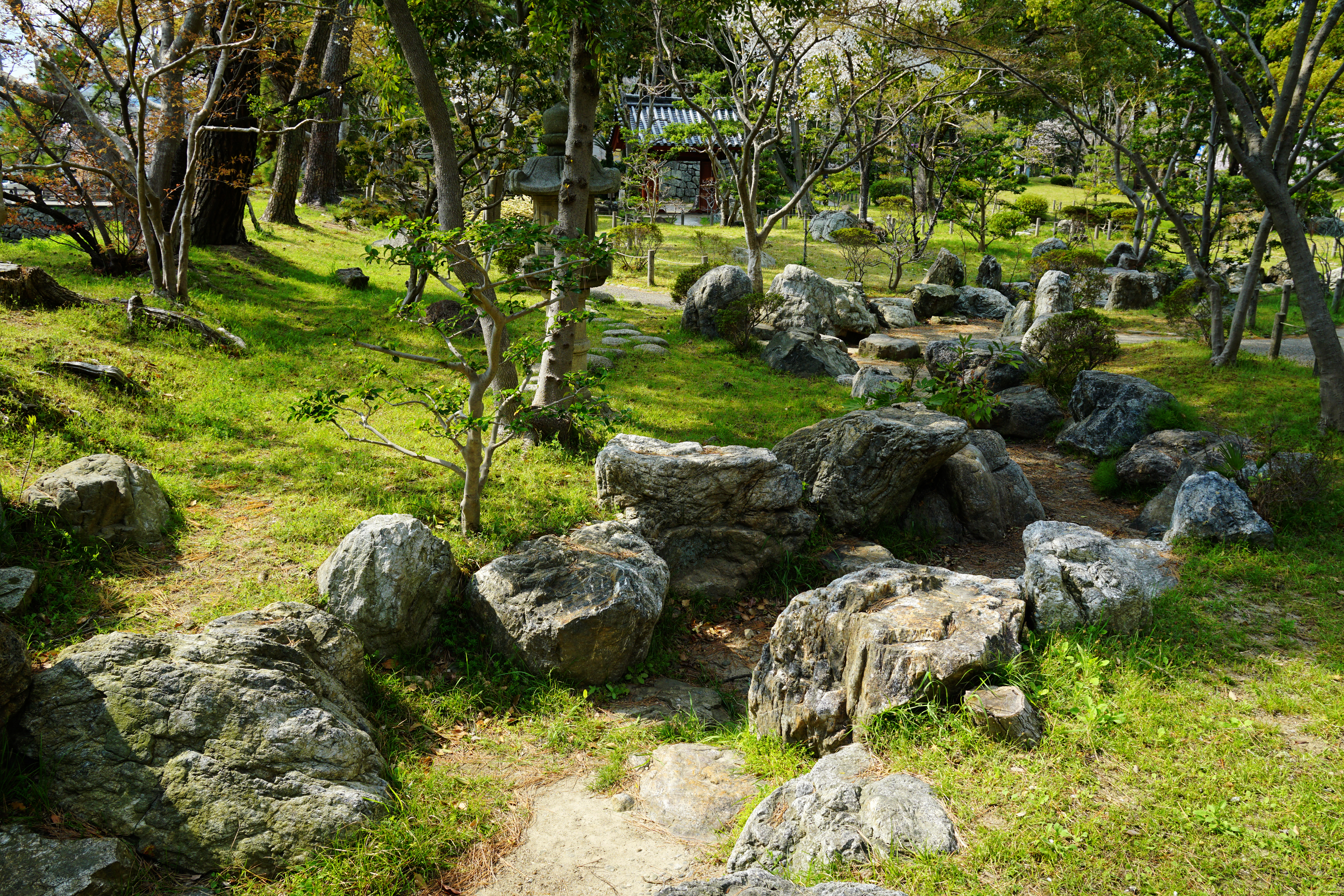
Japanese gardens in the former inner bailey

== Literature ==
- De Lange, William (2021). An Encyclopedia of Japanese Castles. Groningen: Toyo Press. pp. 600 pages. ISBN 978-9492722300.
- Schmorleitz, Morton S. (1974). Castles in Japan. Tokyo: Charles E. Tuttle Co. pp. 144–145. ISBN 0-8048-1102-4.
- Motoo, Hinago (1986). Japanese Castles. Tokyo: Kodansha. p. 200 pages. ISBN 0-87011-766-1.
- Mitchelhill, Jennifer (2004). Castles of the Samurai: Power and Beauty. Tokyo: Kodansha. p. 112 pages. ISBN 4-7700-2954-3.
- Turnbull, Stephen (2003). Japanese Castles 1540–1640. Osprey Publishing. p. 64 pages. ISBN 1-84176-429-9.
