= Tōdō Takasato =

Daimyō of Tsu
- In office 1770–1806
- Preceded by: Tōdō Takanaga
- Succeeded by: Tōdō Takasawa

Personal details
- Born: August 20, 1746
- Died: October 7, 1806 (aged 60)

Tōdō Takasato (藤堂高嶷; August 20, 1746 – October 7, 1806) was a Japanese daimyō of the middle Edo period. He was the 9th daimyō from the Tōdō clan to ruled Tsu Domain in Ise and Iga Provinces.

== Biography ==
Takasato was born in 1746 as the son Tōdō Takahora, a 7000-koku hatamoto, who was adopted to become the 5th daimyo of Hisai Domain, a subsidiary domain of Tsu Domain, in 1728, and subsequently the 8th daimyō of Tsu Domain from 1735. In 1762, Takasato was made daimyo of Hisai. However, on the death of his father in 1770, he turned Hisai over to a younger son of Tōdō Takatoyo, and took on the reign of Tsu Domain itself.

The domain suffered from severe financial problems during his rule, and he attempted a series of reforms, including encouragement of new industries. However, his efforts at land reform and debt moratorium met with tremendous opposition, leading to extensive rioting in 1796. He also attempted to tax shrines and temples in his domain, which also caused a public uproar. Takasato died prematurely in 1806, and was followed by his brother Tōdō Takasawa.

Preceded by Tōdō Takanaga	Daimyō of Tsu; 1770–1806	Succeeded by Tōdō Takasawa
