= Hisai Domain =

Hisai Domain 久居藩
- under Tokugawa shogunate Japan
- 1669–1871
- Capital: Hisai jin'ya
- Area
  - Coordinates: 34°40′34″N 136°27′40″E
- Government
  - Type: Daimyō
- Historical era: Edo period
  - Established: 1669
  - Disestablished: 1871
- Today part of: part of Mie Prefecture

Hisai Domain (久居藩, Hisai-han) was a feudal domain under the Tokugawa shogunate of Edo period Japan, located in Ise Province in former Hisai town (now part of the modern-day city of Tsu, Mie Prefecture). It was centered around Hisai jin'ya. Hisai Domain was a sub-domain of Tsu Domain ruled by a cadet branch of the Tōdō clan.

== History ==
Under Tōdō Takatora, Tsu Domain had a kokudaka of 323,000 koku. However, in 1669 on the retirement of his son Tōdō Takatsugu, 50,000 koku of his holdings were split off to allow his second son Tōdō Takamichi to establish a cadet branch of the clan. This was done to provide an alternate line of succession, in the event that the main lineage of the clan failed to provide a male heir, and to thus avoid the possibility of attainder, which was a constant concern for the tozama daimyo. Although Hisai Domain was styled as a "castle-holding domain", Tōdō Takamichi was not permitted to build a Japanese castle, but had to be content with a jin'ya, or fortified residence. Tōdō Takamichi's successor, Tōdō Takakata brought another 3000 koku to the domain, raising its kokudaka to 53,000 koku. As a sub-domain of Tsu Domain, Hisai Domain as a rule followed the customs and direction of the parent house; however, the domain was plagued by many misfortunes. The domain's Edo residence burned down five times, and the domain suffered frequently from crop failures and natural disasters. On them other hand, the parent house suffered frequently from lack of a direct heir, and many of the daimyō of Tsu Domain assumed that post after gaining experience in administering Hisai. The domain's financial situation was especially bad after the Great Tenmei famine of 1782 to 1788. However due to the reforms initiated by the 12th daimyō of Tsu, Tōdō Takasato, the finances of the domain were restored. After his death, problems arose again, until the time of the 15th daimyō Tōdō Takayori in the Bakumatsu period, with the development of new rice lands and flood control works on the Kumozu River. With the start of the Boshin War, Hisai Domain followed Tsu Domain's lead in joining with the Satchō Alliance forces. Following the establishment of the Meiji government and the 1871 abolition of the han system, the territory of Hisai Domain became part of Mie prefecture in 1876.

The Hisai jin'ya was located on the outskirts of Tsu, at what is now the grounds of the Hisai Junior High School.

== List of daimyō ==
#	Name	Tenure	Courtesy title	Court Rank	kokudaka
Tōdō clan, 1610-1615 (fudai)
1	Tōdō Takamichi (藤堂高通)	1669–1697	Sado-no-kami (佐渡守)	Junior 5th Rank, Lower Grade (従五位下)	50,000 ->53,000 koku
2	Tōdō Takakata (藤堂高堅)	1697–1715	Bizen-no-kami (備前守)	Junior 5th Rank, Lower Grade (従五位下)	53,000 koku
3	Tōdō Takanobu (藤堂高陳)	1715–1723	Bizen-no-kami (備前守)	Junior 5th Rank, Lower Grade (従五位下)	53,000 koku
4	Tōdō Takaharu (藤堂高治)	1723–1728	Daizen-no-suke (大膳亮)	Junior 5th Rank, Lower Grade (従五位下)	53,000 koku
5	Tōdō Takahora (藤堂高朗)	1728 –1735	Daizen-no-suke (大膳亮)	Junior 5th Rank, Lower Grade (従五位下)	53,000 koku
6	Tōdō Takamasa (藤堂高雅)	1735 –1762	'Sado-no-kami (佐渡守)	Junior 5th Rank, Lower Grade (従五位下)	53,000 koku
7	Tōdō Takasato (藤堂高嶷)	1762 –1770	Daizen-no-suke (大膳亮)	Junior 5th Rank, Lower Grade (従五位下)	53,000 koku
8	Tōdō Takaeda (藤堂高朶)	1770 –1775	Sakyo-no-suke (左京亮)	Junior 5th Rank, Lower Grade (従五位下)	53,000 koku
9	Tōdō Takaoki (藤堂高興)	1775 –1777	Danjo-chu (弾正忠)	Junior 5th Rank, Lower Grade (従五位下)	53,000 koku
10	Tōdō Takahira (藤堂高衡)	1777 –1781	Sado-no-kami (佐渡守)	Junior 5th Rank, Lower Grade (従五位下)	53,000 koku
11	Tōdō Takanao (藤堂高矗)	1781 –1790	Sado-no-kami (佐渡守)	Junior 5th Rank, Lower Grade (従五位下)	53,000 koku
12	Tōdō Takasawa (藤堂高兌)	1790–1806	Sakon-no-taifu (左近将監)	Junior 5th Rank, Lower Grade (従五位下)	53,000 koku
13	Tōdō Takato (藤堂高邁)	1806–1818	Sado-no-kami (佐渡守)	Junior 5th Rank, Lower Grade (従五位下)	53,000 koku
14	Tōdō Takayatsu (藤堂高秭)	1818–1832	Sado-no-kami (佐渡守)	Junior 5th Rank, Lower Grade (従五位下)	53,000 koku
15	Tōdō Takayori (藤堂高聴)	1832–1863	Sado-no-kami (佐渡守)	Junior 5th Rank, Lower Grade (従五位下)	53,000 koku
16	Tōdō Takakuni (藤堂高聴)	1863–1871	Sado-no-kami (佐渡守)	Junior 5th Rank, Lower Grade (従五位下)	53,000 koku

== See also ==
- List of Han
- Abolition of the han system
