= Imabari Castle =

Japanese castle in Imabari, Ehime, Japan

- 今治城
- Imabari, Ehime Prefecture, Japan
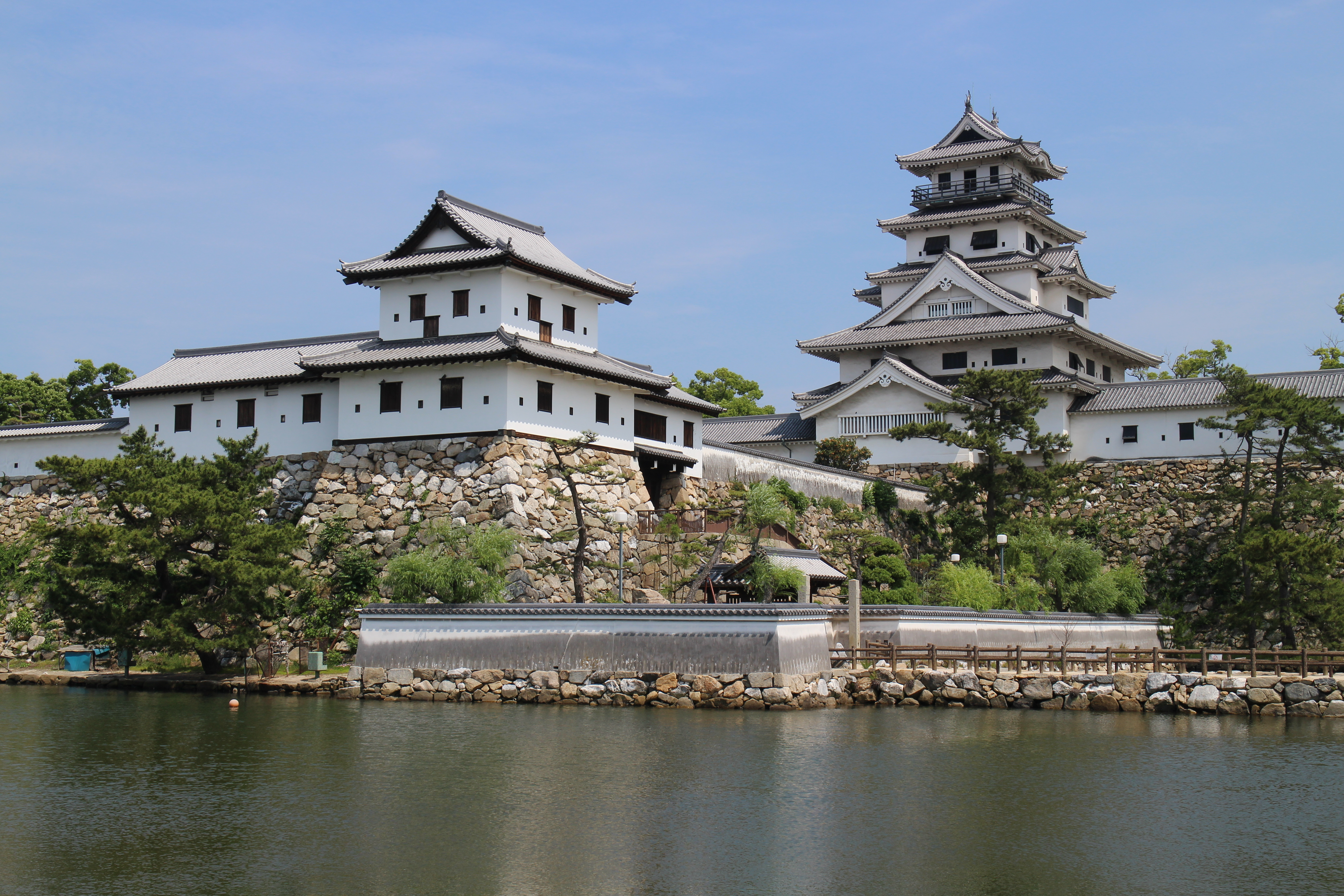
- Imabari Castle tenshu and Yamazato Yagura

Site information
- Type: Japanese castle
- Condition: reconstructed

Location
- Ne Castle
- Location within Ehime Prefecture Location within Japan
- Coordinates: 34°3′48.01″N 133°0′24.5″E

Site history
- Built: 1602-1606
- Built by: Tōdō Takatora
- In use: 1604-1873
- Demolished: 1873

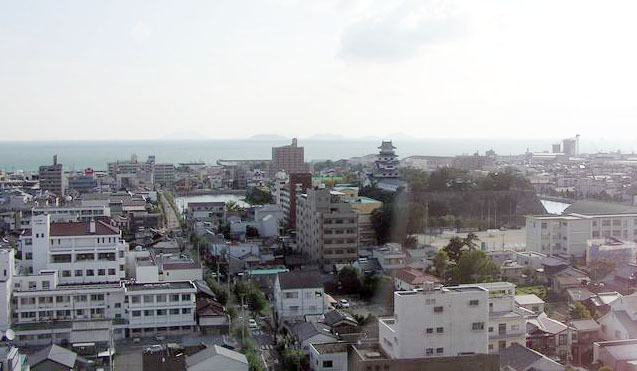
Imabari Castle is in the center right.

Imabari Castle (今治城, Imabari-jō) is a Japanese castle in Imabari, Ehime, Japan. It was the center of Imabari Domain during the Edo Period Tokugawa shogunate and was ruled by a branch of the Hisamatsu-Matsudaira clan for most of its history.

This castle is well known as one of the three Mizujiro, or "Castles on the sea", in Japan, along with Takamatsu Castle in Kagawa Prefecture and Nakatsu Castle in Ōita Prefecture.

== History ==
Imabari Castle is located in the center of the city of Imabari and faces the Seto Inland Sea, which forms part of its defenses. The area of Imabari is situated in the center of ancient Iyo Province and is strategically located as the connection point between Shikoku and Honshu through the narrow channels of the Geiyo Islands. During the Heian period, the area was a stronghold of Sumitomo no Fujiwara, who rebelled against the authority of the Emperor in Kyoto, and afterwards was dominated by the Murakami clan, a maritime clan who engaged in shipping or as pilots for vessels through the complex channels and rocky straits, but who also occasionally acted as pirates or as the mercenary naval force for a powerful warlord. During the Sengoku period, the Murakami clan owed fealty to the Mōri clan, to whom they provided aid at the Battle of Miyajima, but their military activities were suppressed by Toyotomi Hideyoshi. After the Battle of Sekigahara, Tokugawa Ieyasu installed his general Tōdō Takatora as daimyō of the 200,000 koku Imabari Domain. Tōdō was expected to control the narrows in the Seto Inland Sea and to offset Fukushima Masanori, whom Toyotomi Hideyoshi had installed in Hiroshima Castle on the opposite side of the Seto Inland Sea. Tōdō first resided at Kokufu Castle located on the top of Mount Karako, several kilometers from Imabari. However, due to its inconvenient location and restricted geography, he decided to build a new castle and castle town on the coast. Tōdō was also known as an excellent castle designer, and constructed both Uwajima Castle and Ōzu Castle. The new Imabari Castle was completed in 1608, six years after construction began.

The castle consisted of three concentric enclosures, each surrounded by a water moat that was connected to the sea. The second enclosure also had a small anchorage area surrounded by walls so that the castle could be accessed directly by sea. The inner bailey had a five-story tenshu, but this structure was later dismantled and relocated to Tanba Kameyama Castle, which had also been built by Tōdō Takatora.

In 1609, just after the completion of Imabari Castle, Tōdō Takatora was transferred to Tsu Domain. He was replaced at Imabari in 1635 by a cadet branch of the Hisamatsu-Matsudaira clan headed by Matsudaira Sadafusa who was a nephew of Tokugawa Ieyasu, and his descendants ruled Imabari for the rest of the Edo period.

After the Meiji Restoration, most of the buildings associated with the castle were destroyed, and the land was sold to local Shinto shrine. Only one yagura at the north corner of the Ninomaru enclosure was left, as it was used as an armory by the local army garrison, but when a fire broke out in 1871, the gunpowder inside ignited and exploded and the building was destroyed. In 1980, the Imabari City government constructed a new tenshu out of reinforced concrete. Two yagura were also reconstructed based on old photographs, one in 1985 and ten others in 1990. In 2006, the castle was selected as one of Japan's Top 100 Castles by the Japan Castle Foundation in 2006. In 2007, a large gate, along with five smaller yagura were reconstructed, and a statue of Tōdō Takatora was installed in the second enclosure.

The castle is located a 20-minute walk from the JR Shikoku Imabari Station.

== Features ==
Imabari Castle features a vast seawater moat, a high stone wall and a rare style of main gate. The moat averages 60 meters in length and is intended to neutralize arrows. Almost all parts of the high stone wall have remain unchanged since the Edo period. The main gate, Kurogane Main Gate (鉄御門, Kurogane-gomon), is iron-plated and flanked by turrets.

== State of reconstruction ==
Only the walls and moat of Imabari Castle remain intact from the original structures. The remaining buildings are reconstructions. In particular, the tenshu, or keep, is a modern concrete construction, only imitating the outer appearance of the original. The interior is modern and not representative of the original design. It houses several exhibitions regarding weapons, armor, writings and castle photography. Its top floor serves as a viewing point over the city. The tenshu also houses the city's natural science museum.

The Kurogane-gomon and Bugu-yagura turrets have also been reconstructed, with a modern interior and a small exhibition including a model and various videos that explain their function and the castle's history. Further buildings include the Yamazato-yagura and Okane-yagura turrets, which are home to the antiquity museum and local art museum.

== Literature ==
- Benesch, Oleg and Ran Zwigenberg (2019). Japan's Castles: Citadels of Modernity in War and Peace. Cambridge: Cambridge University Press. p. 374. ISBN 9781108481946.
- De Lange, William (2021). An Encyclopedia of Japanese Castles. Groningen: Toyo Press. pp. 600 pages. ISBN 978-9492722300.
- Schmorleitz, Morton S. (1974). Castles in Japan. Tokyo: Charles E. Tuttle Co. pp. 144–145. ISBN 0-8048-1102-4.
- Motoo, Hinago (1986). Japanese Castles. Tokyo: Kodansha. p. 200 pages. ISBN 0-87011-766-1.
- Mitchelhill, Jennifer (2004). Castles of the Samurai: Power and Beauty. Tokyo: Kodansha. p. 112 pages. ISBN 4-7700-2954-3.
- Turnbull, Stephen (2003). Japanese Castles 1540-1640. Osprey Publishing. p. 64 pages. ISBN 1-84176-429-9.
