= Katsunaga =

- Gender: Male

Origin
- Origin: Japanese
- Meaning: Different meanings depending on the kanji used

Katsunaga (written: 雄永, 勝永 or 勝長) is a masculine Japanese given name. Notable people with the name include:

- Hijikata Katsunaga (土方 雄永) (1851–1884), Japanese daimyō
- Irobe Katsunaga (色部 勝長) (died 1569), Japanese samurai
- Mōri Katsunaga (利 勝永) (1577–1615), Japanese samurai
- Oda Katsunaga (織田 勝長) (1568–1582), Japanese samurai
