= Battle of Yao =

Battle of Yao may refer to:

- Battle of Xiao or Yao, 627 BC in China
- Battle of Yao (1615)
