= Tōdō Takasawa =

Japanese feudal lord

Junior Third Rank Tōdō Takasawa
- 藤堂 高兌
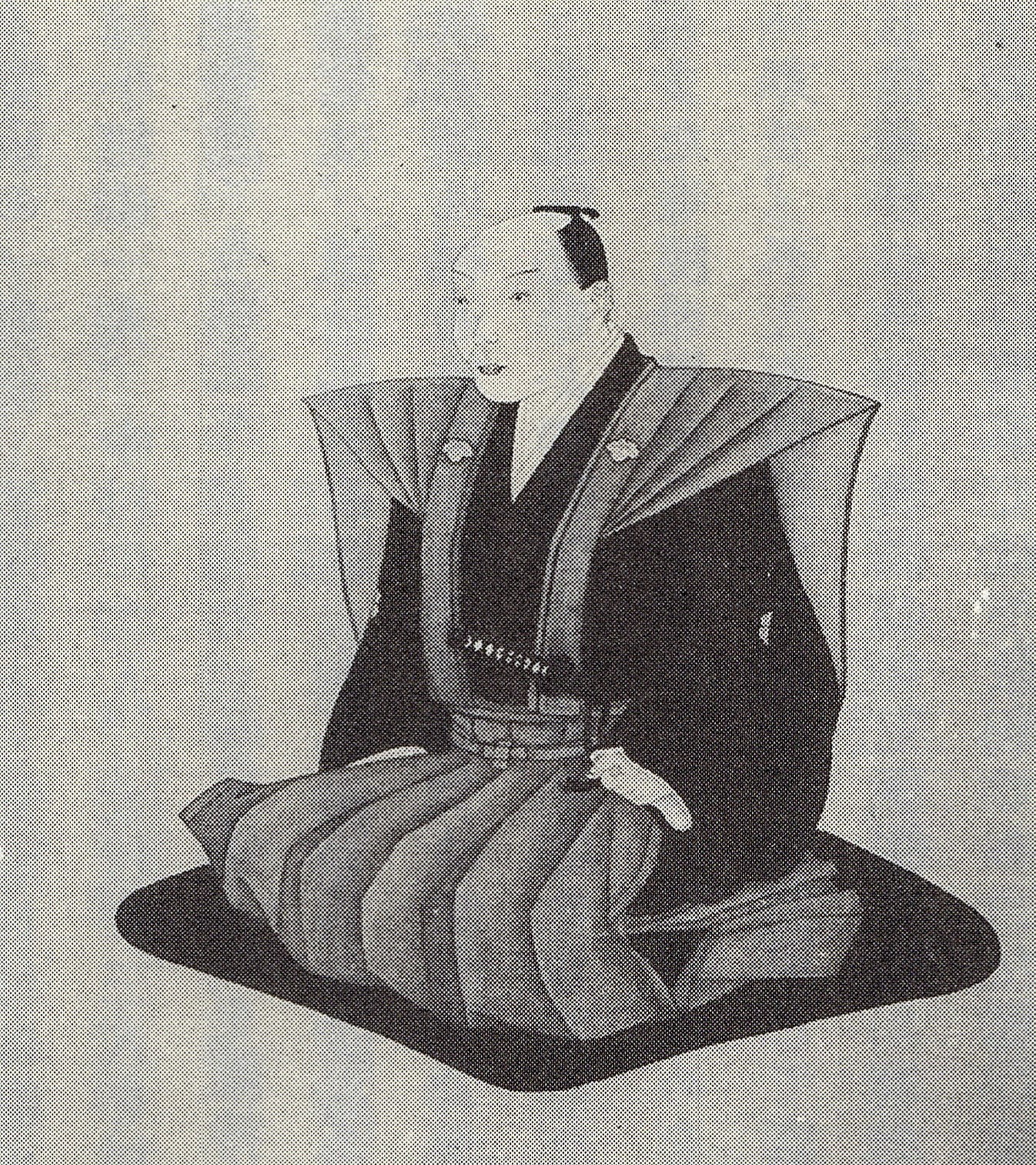

Daimyō of Tsu
- In office 1806–1825
- Preceded by: Tōdō Takasato
- Succeeded by: Tōdō Takayuki

Personal details
- Born: April 25, 1781
- Died: February 4, 1825 (aged 43)

Tōdō Takasawa (藤堂 高兌; April 25, 1781 – February 4, 1825) was a Japanese daimyō of the middle Edo period. He was the 10th daimyō from the Tōdō clan to ruled Tsu Domain in Ise and Iga Provinces.

== Biography ==
Takasawa was born in 1781 as the son of the previous daimyo of Tsu Domain, Tōdō Takasato. However, in 1790, he was adopted by Tōdō Takasawa, the daimyo of Hisa Domain, a subsidiary domain of Tsu domain. Takasawa died the same year, and although only nine years old, Takasawa became daimyo of Hisai. The domain suffered from severe financial problems due to the frequent deaths of its lords, and lack of fiscal control. Under Takasawa, a series of reforms were implemented, including increased taxes, an involuntary saving system and fiscal restraint. A low-interest loan system was also implemented to encourage investment in new businesses and a reserve of capital was created to cope with natural disasters.

In 1806, due to the premature death of his brother, Takasawa was transferred to Tsu Domain. At Tsu, he found the economic situation similar to that of Hisai, and therefore implemented the same reforms, despite the resistance of many sectors of society. One of his actions was a debt moratorium, which upset moneylenders. Takasawa attempted to set an example, by cutting his own stipends, and wearing cotton instead of silk. His efforts to combat corruption and to increase the arable land of the domain through better irrigation eventually paid off, and the domain’s finances recovered. Takasawa also strongly sponsored the domain’s academy, incorporating studies of rangaku as well as kokugaku and the martial arts.

Takasawa died in 1825 of illness at the age of 44. He was succeeded by his son, Takayuki, who did not maintain his fiscal reforms, and the economic situation was the domain again began to deteriorate towards the Bakumatsu period.

His grave is at the temple of Kansho-in, a sub-temple of the Kanei-ji, located in Ueno, Tokyo.

Preceded by Tōdō Takasato	Daimyō of Tsu; 1806–1825	Succeeded by Tōdō Takayuki
