= Hijikata Katsuyuki =

Japanese politician

Viscount Hijikata Katsuyuki
- 土方雄志
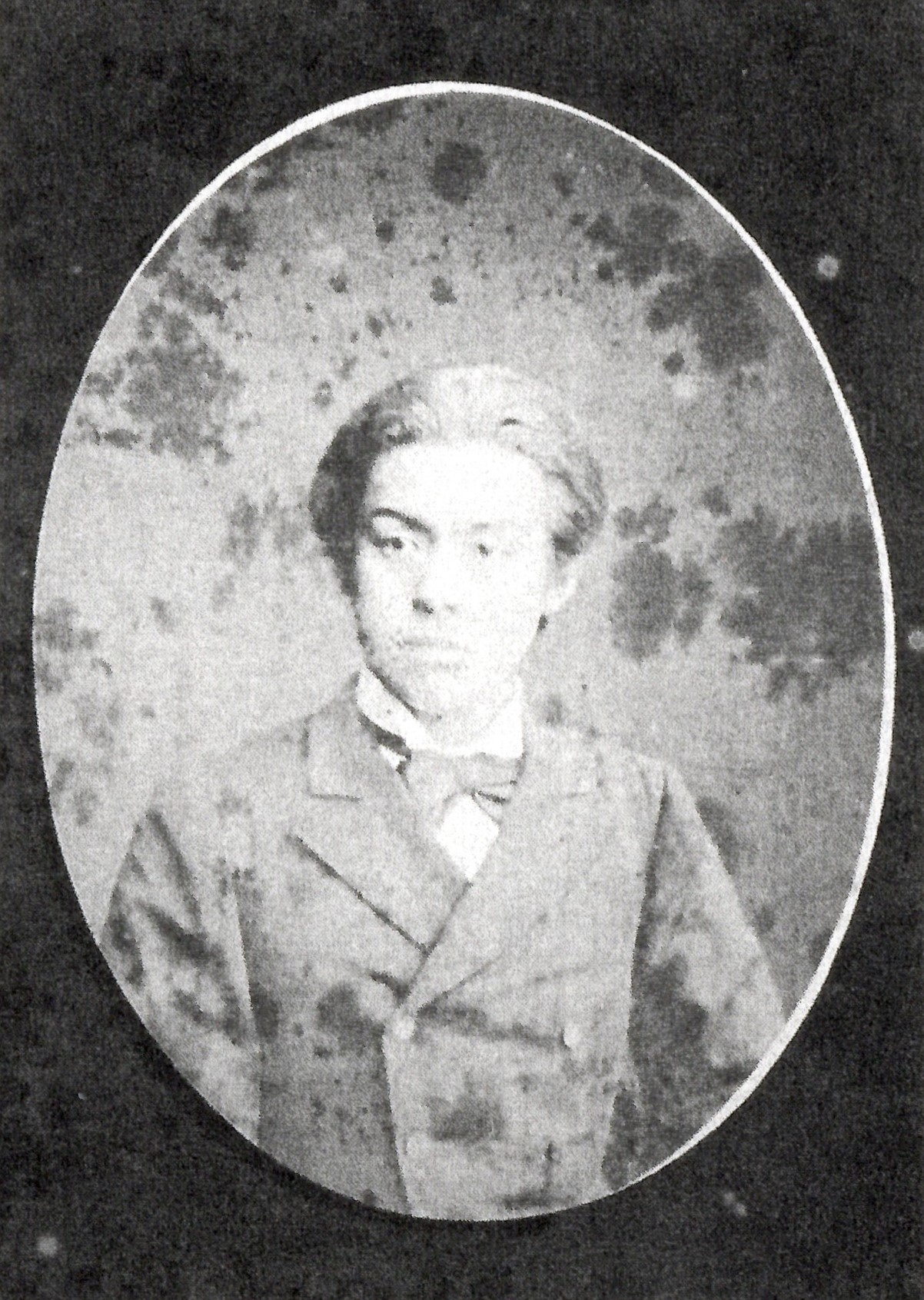
- Hijikata Katsuyuki, post-Meiji restoration

Member of the House of Peers
- In office 10 July 1918 – 10 July 1925 Elected by the Viscounts
- In office 10 July 1890 – 10 July 1897 Elected by the Viscounts

Governor of Komono Domain
- In office 11 October 1870 – 1 September 1871
- Monarch: Meiji
- Preceded by: Hijikata Katsunaga (as Daimyō of Komono)
- Succeeded by: Position abolished

Personal details
- Born: 31 August 1856
- Died: 24 April 1931 (aged 74)

Hijikata Katsuyuki (土方雄志; 31 August 1856 – 24 April 1932) was the 13th (and last) daimyō of Komono Domain in Ise Province (modern-day Mie Prefecture) in early Meiji period Japan.

== Biography ==
Hijikata Katsuyuki was the nephew of the 10th daimyō of Komono, Hijikata Katsuoki, and was heir to a 1000 koku hatamoto holding. He was adopted as heir to the 12th daimyō, Hijikata Katsunaga who was only five years his senior, in 1869, as Katsunaga was very sickly. Katsunaga retired the same year, and Katsuyuki was proclaimed daimyō; however, by this time that title had been formally abolished by the new Meiji government and his official title was that of Imperial Governor. In 1871, after the abolition of the han system he moved to Tokyo, and in November of the same year, he entered Keio University to study the English language

In 1878, he joined the Ministry of Industry. With the establishment of kazoku peerage on 8 July 1884, he was made a viscount (shishaku) and served as a member of the House of Peers from July 1890 to July 1897. In 1899, he was the secretary of the Camphor Bureau of the Governor-General of Taiwan. On his return to mainland Japan, he again served as a member of the House of Peers from July 1918 to July 1925.

In November 1925, he retired in favor of his nephew, Hijikata Katsutake. Katsutake's father, Hisaakira Hijikata, was Katsuyuki's younger brother and was subsequently the 12th president of the Bank of Japan. Hijikata Katsuyuki died on 24 April 1931, and his grave is at the temple of Gensho-ji in Komono.
