= Tōdō Takayuki =

Japanese daimyō and chieftain (1813–1895)

Senior Second Rank Tōdō Takayuki
- 藤堂 高猷
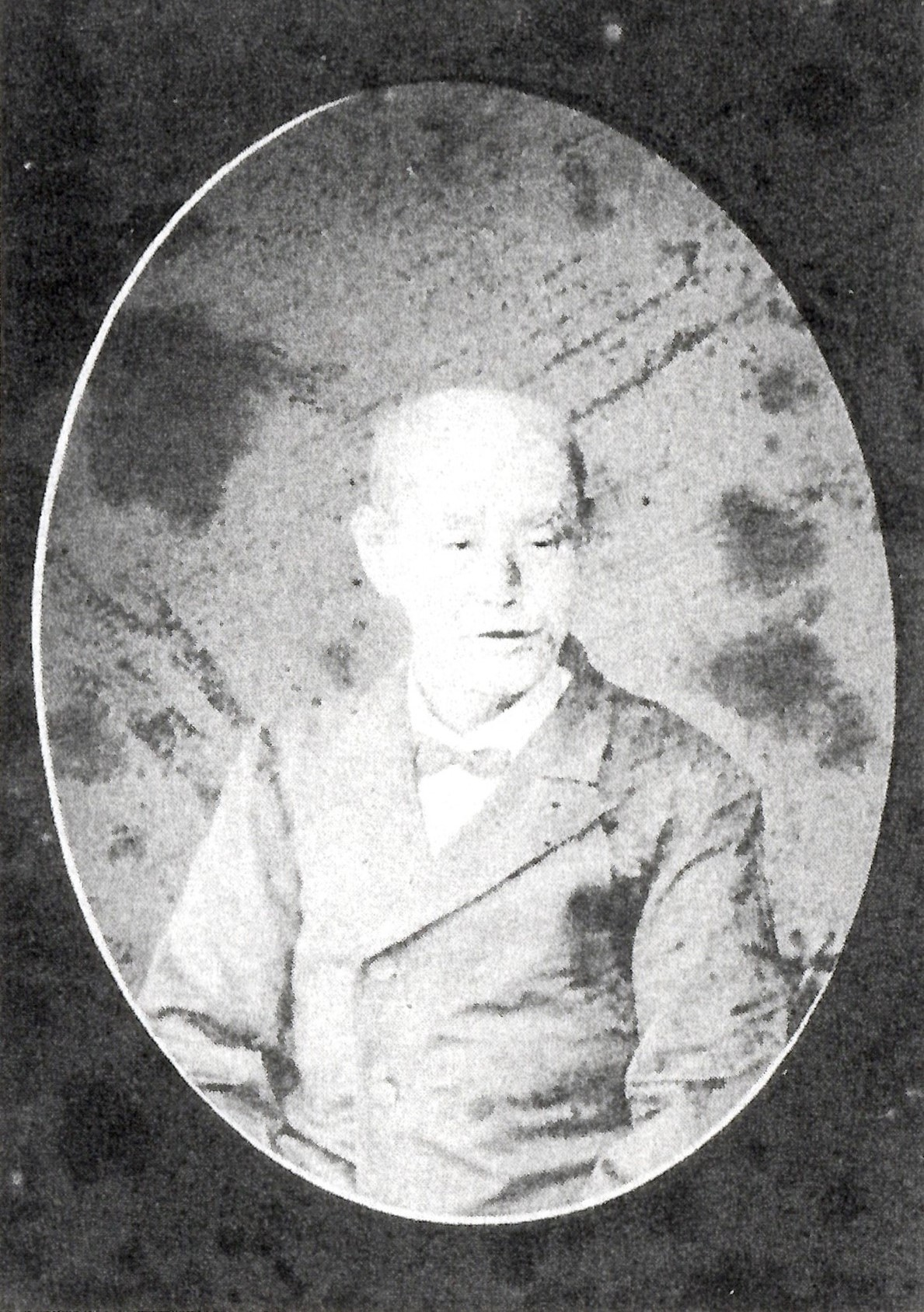
- Tōdō Takayuki, post-Meiji restoration

11th Daimyō of Tsu Domain
- In office 1825–1869
- Monarchs: Shōgun: Tokugawa Ienari; Tokugawa Ieyoshi; Tokugawa Iesada; Tokugawa Iemochi; Tokugawa Yoshinobu
- Preceded by: Tōdō Takasawa
- Succeeded by: Tōdō Takakiyo

Imperial Governor of Tsu Domain
- In office 1869–1871
- Monarch: Emperor Meiji

Personal details
- Born: March 11, 1813
- Died: February 9, 1895 (aged 81); Tokyo, Japan
- Parent: Tōdō Takasawa (father)

Tōdō Takayuki (藤堂 高猷; March 11, 1813 – February 9, 1895) was the 11th daimyō of Tsu Domain under the late Edo period Tokugawa shogunate and the 19th hereditary chieftain of the Tōdō clan. Takayuki's sudden betrayal of the Tokugawa forces at the Battle of Toba–Fushimi during the Boshin War was one of the decisive factors which turned the battle in the imperial army's favor.

== Biography ==
Takayuki was born in 1813 as the son of the previous daimyō of Tsu Domain, Tōdō Takasawa. His mother was a daughter of the daimyō of Tanakura Domain, Nagai Naonobu. He succeeded his father as daimyō at the age of 11. That year, he was received in formal audience by Shogun Tokugawa Ienari and two years later was accorded the courtesy titles of Izumi-no-kam and jijū, and Junior Fourth court rank.His courtesy title was promoted to Sakon'e-no-shosho (左少将) in 1840.

In 1842, as concern over the increasing incursions of foreign kurofune warships into Japanese waters grew, the shogunate ordered Tsu Domain to assume guard duties over Ise Grand Shrine, which included the construction of artillery batteries. Saitō Satsudō, the head of the domain academy, incorporated rangaku technology to build modern batteries and attempted to modernize the domain’s military. Tōdō Takayuki also attempted to introduce other forms of western science, including photography, by sponsoring equipment and a laboratory for Ueno Hikoma at the domain’s residence in Edo. In 1861, Tōdō Takayuki was further promoted to Sakon'e-no-chusho (左中将).

Tōdō Takayuki promoted the policy of Kōbu gattai aimed to strengthen political coordination between the Tokugawa shogunate and the Japanese Imperial Court, but he was not very involved in the shogunate administration.

During the Tenchūgumi Incident in 1863, the domain was called upon to send forces to Kyoto to help suppress the pro-sonnō jōi rebels; however, as with many domains during the tumultuous Bakumatsu period, the samurai of the domain were divided into factions between those to supported the sonnō jōi movement and those remaining loyal to the shogunate. At the Battle of Toba–Fushimi at the start of the Boshin War, the forces of Tsu Domain initially supported the Tokugawa side; however, when the battle began to turn in the favor of the Satchō Alliance forces, Tsu Domain quickly changed sides, contributing strongly to the defeat of the Tokugawa forces. Tsu Domain subsequently contributed military forces to other battles of the Boshin War, including the Battle of Hakodate on the side of the new Meiji government.

On June 28, 1871, Takayuki officially retired, turning over his offices to his eldest son Tōdō Takakiyo. He died in Tokyo at the age of 83 in 1895. He was posthumously awarded with Second court rank, and the Order of the Sacred Treasure, 2nd class.

Takayuki is believed by some historians to be the father of the Shinsengumi samurai, Tōdō Heisuke, but there is no direct documentary evidence.

== Sources ==
- Himeno, Junichi. "Encounters With Foreign Photographers: The Introduction and Spread of Photography in Kyūshū". In Reflecting Truth: Japanese Photography in the Nineteenth Century (Amsterdam: Hotei Publishing, 2004), 18–29.
- Totman, Conrad (1980). Collapse of the Tokugawa Bakufu. (Honolulu: University of Hawai'i Press), pp. 425–429.
