= Hijikata Katsunaga =

Japanese daimyō

- 土方 雄永
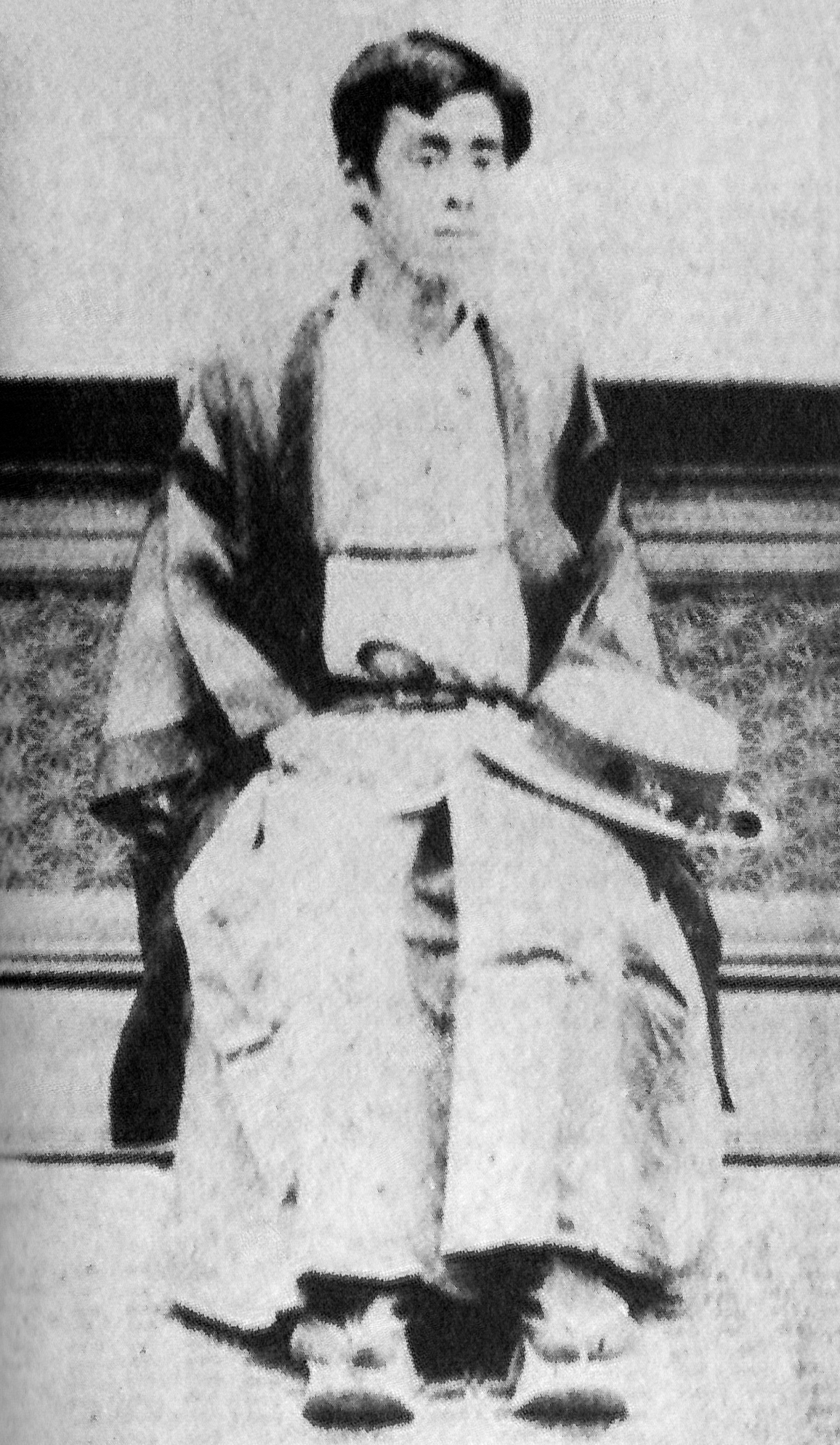
- Hijikata Katsunaga, post-Meiji restoration

12th Daimyō of Komono Domain
- In office 1858–1869
- Monarchs: Shōgun: Tokugawa Iesada; Tokugawa Iemochi; Tokugawa Yoshinobu
- Preceded by: Hijikata Katsuyoshi
- Succeeded by: Hijikata Katsuyuki

Imperial governor of Komono
- In office 1869–1870
- Monarch: Emperor Meiji

Personal details
- Born: April 22, 1851
- Died: May 10, 1884 (aged 33)
- Spouse: Takeya Masu
- Parent: Hijikata Katsuyoshi (father)

Hijikata Katsunaga (土方 雄永, April 22, 1851 – May 10, 1884) was the 12th (and next-to-last) daimyō of Komono Domain in Ise Province (modern-day Mie Prefecture) under the Bakumatsu period Tokugawa shogunate of Japan. His courtesy title was Yamato-no-kami, and his court rank was Junior 5th Rank, Lower Grade.

== Biography ==
Hijikata Katsunaga was the son of then 11th daimyō of Komono, Hijikata Katsuyoshi, and he became daimyō at the age of seven on his father's death. Because of his youth, he was assisted by his great-uncle Hijikata Yoshiyuki. During this period, as with many of the feudal domains of Japan, the samurai were divided between a pro-sonnō jōi faction who favored a restoration of political power to the Emperor of Japan and a stronger foreign policy, and a pro-status quo faction still loyal to the Tokugawa shogunate. On the start of the Boshin War, Hijikata Katsunaga declared the domain for the imperial cause, and contributed to the eastward march of pro-imperial forces to overthrow the Tokugawa. On the abolition of the position of daimyō in 1869, he was appointed imperial governor of Komono. However, he was of weak health since childhood and retired in the fall of 1870 in favor of his adopted son, Hijikata Katsuyuki. The following year, with the abolition of the han system, he relocated to Tokyo. He died May 10, 1884, at the age of 34, and his grave is at the Yanaka Cemetery, in Taitō, Tokyo.
