= Battle of Yao (1615) =

Battle

- Part of the early Edo period
| Date | 1615 |
| Location | Kawachi Province |
| Result | Tokugawa victory |

Belligerents
| Tokugawa shogunate | Toyotomi clan |

Commanders and leaders
| Tōdō Takatora; Tōdō Takanori †; Tōdō Ujikatsu † | Chōsokabe Morichika |

The Battle of Yao (Japanese: 八尾の戦い, Hepburn: Yao no tatakai) was a confrontation that took place in 1615 during the early Edo period in Japan. The battle occurred in 1615 during the Siege of Osaka, in which Tokugawa Ieyasu planned to destroy the Toyotomi clan. It was fought between the Tōdō clan and the Chōsokabe clan. There is not much detail about the battle, but it is known that the Tõdõ clan was led by Tōdō Takatora, who won the battle, forcing the Chōsokabe clan, led by Chōsokabe Morichika, to retreat to Osaka. Though Takatora won the battle, his two sons died in combat.
