= Komono Domain =

Feudal domain in Japan, 1601–1871

Komono Domain 菰野藩
- under Tokugawa shogunate Japan
- 1601–1871
- Capital: Komono jin'ya
  - Type: Daimyō
- Historical era: Edo period
  - Established: 1601
  - Disestablished: 1871
- Today part of: part of Mie Prefecture

Komono Domain (菰野藩, Komono-han) was a feudal domain under the Tokugawa shogunate of Edo period Japan, located in Ise Province in what is part of now modern-day town of Komono, Mie. It was centered around Komono jin'ya. Komono Domain was controlled by the tozama Hijikata clan throughout its history. Hijikata Toshizō, the famed leader of the pro-Tokugawa Shinsengumi during the Bakumatsu period was from a distance cadet branch of the Hijikata clan, and has no connection with this domain.

== History ==
Hijikata Katsuuji was a Sengoku period samurai in the service of Oda Nobunaga and subsequently Toyotomi Hideyoshi and held fiefs with a kokudaka of 10,000 koku in Komono, Ise Province. However, in 1599 he was accused of complicity in a plot to assassinate Tokugawa Ieyasu, and was dispossessed and exiled to Hitachi-Ōta. He was pardoned before the Battle of Sekigahara, where he distinguished himself in combat, and was reinstated to his former domains, with a 2000 koku increase. His successor, Hijikata Katsutaka, built a jin'ya from which to rule the domain, laid out the foundations for the castle town and invited merchants to populate it. The Hijikata clan continued to rule the territory until the Meiji restoration. However, the domain's finances were always precarious, and with large expenses due to duties at Osaka and Kyoto imposed by the shogunate, coupled with poor harvests, the situation became critical by the time of Hijikata Yoshitane, the 9th daimyō, who implemented Sumptuary laws, irrigation work, and speculation on rice futures in order to achieve financial reconstruction. He also founded the domain academy "Reisawakan". Hijikata Katsuoki, the 10th daimyō developed a higher value "brand rice" and Hijikata Katsuyoshi, the 11th daimyō began the production of tea as a cash crop. During the Boshin War, although opinion in the domain was initially divided in support between the Shogunate and the Emperor, Hijikata Katsunaga, the 12th daimyō, opted to support the new Meiji government. Komono Domain, as with all other domains, was ended with the abolition of the han system in 1871.

== Holdings at the end of the Edo period ==
As with most domains in the han system, Komono Domain consisted of several discontinuous territories calculated to provide the assigned kokudaka, based on periodic cadastral surveys and projected agricultural yields.

- Ise Province
  - 16 villages in Mie District
- Ōmi Province
  - 5 villages in Kurita District

== List of daimyō ==
| # | Name | Tenure | Courtesy title | Court Rank | kokudaka |
|---|---|---|---|---|---|
Hijikata clan, 1702-1871 (tozama)
| 1 | Hijikata Katsuuji (土方雄氏) | 1600–1635 | Tango-no-kami (丹後守) | Junior 5th Rank, Lower Grade (従五位下) | 12,000 koku |
| 2 | Hijikata Katsutaka (土方雄高) | 1635–1651 | Tango-no-kami (丹後守) | Junior 5th Rank, Lower Grade (従五位下) | 12,000 koku |
| 3 | Hijikata Katsutoyo (土方雄豊) | 1651–1705 | Bitchu-no-kami (備中守) | Junior 5th Rank, Lower Grade (従五位下) | 12,000 koku |
| 4 | Hijikata Toyoyoshi (土方豊義) | 1705-1719 | Tango-no-kami (丹後守) | Junior 5th Rank, Lower Grade (従五位下) | 12,000 koku |
| 5 | Hijikata Katsufusa (土方雄房) | 1719–1750 | Tango-no-kami (丹後守) | Junior 5th Rank, Lower Grade (従五位下) | 12,000 koku |
| 6 | Hijikata Katsumasa (土方雄端) | 1750–1758 | Bitchu-no-kami (備中守) | Junior 5th Rank, Lower Grade (従五位下) | 12,000 koku |
| 6 | Hijikata Katsunaga (土方雄年) | 1758–1780 | Omi-no-kami (近江守) | Junior 5th Rank, Lower Grade (従五位下) | 12,000 koku |
| 7 | Hijikata Katsusada (土方雄貞) | 1780 - 1782 | Tango-no-kami (丹後守) | Junior 5th Rank, Lower Grade (従五位下) | 12,000 koku |
| 8 | Hijikata Yoshitane (土方義苗) | 1782 - 1835 | Yamato-no-kami (大和守) | Junior 5th Rank, Lower Grade (従五位下) | 12,000 koku |
| 9 | Hijikata Katsuoki (土方雄興) | 1835 - 1838 | Tonomo-no-kami (主殿頭) | Junior 5th Rank, Lower Grade (従五位下) | 12,000 koku |
| 10 | Hijikata Katsuyoshi (土方雄嘉) | 1838 - 1858 | Bitchu-no-kami (備中守) | Junior 5th Rank, Lower Grade (従五位下) | 12,000 koku |
| 11 | Hijikata Katsunaga (土方雄永) | 1858 - 1870 | Yamato-no-kami (大和守) | Junior 5th Rank, Lower Grade (従五位下) | 12,000 koku |
| 12 | Hijikata Katsuyuki (土方雄志) | 1870 - 1871 | - | Junior 5th Rank (従五位) | 12,000 koku |

== See also ==
- List of Han
- Abolition of the han system
