= Tōdō Takatora =

Japanese daimyo

Junior Third Rank Tōdō Takatora
- 藤堂 高虎
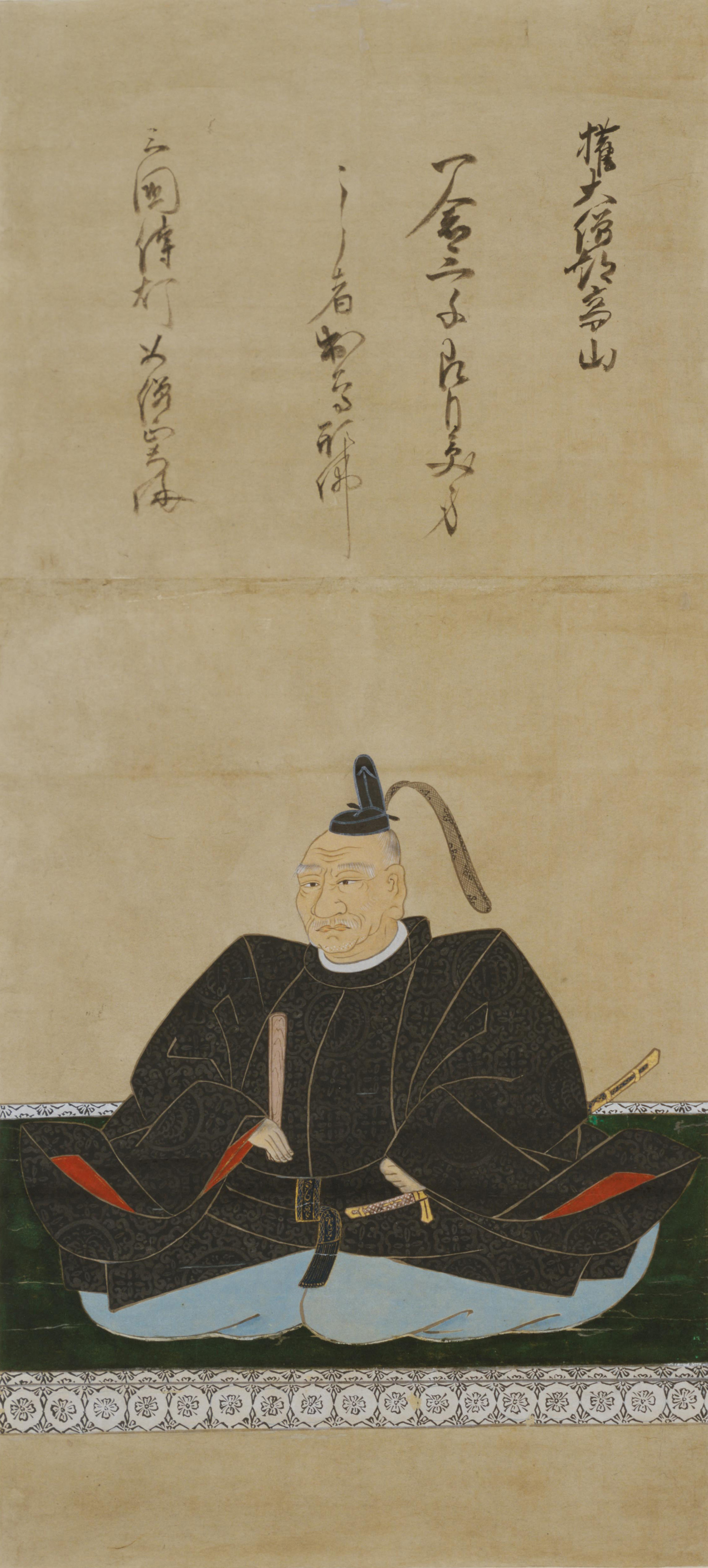

First Lord of Imabari
- In office 1600–1608
- Preceded by: none
- Succeeded by: Matsudaira Sadafusa

First Daimyō of Tsu
- In office 1608–1630
- Preceded by: none
- Succeeded by: Tōdō Takatsugu

Personal details
- Born: February 16, 1556 Tōdō Village, Ōmi Province, Japan
- Died: November 9, 1630 (aged 74) Edo, Japan

Military service
- Allegiance: Azai clan Oda clan Toyotomi clan Eastern Army; Tokugawa shogunate
- Unit: Tōdō clan
- Battles/wars: Tajima Campaign; Siege of Miki; Battle of Shizugatake; Siege of Negoro-ji; Invasion of Shikoku; Kyushu Campaign; Invasion of Korea: Battle of Myeongnyang; Battle of Chilcheollyang; Sekigahara Campaign: Battle of Gifu Castle; Battle of Sekigahara; Siege of Osaka: Battle of Yao

Tōdō Takatora (藤堂 高虎; February 16, 1556 – November 9, 1630) was a Japanese daimyō of the Tōdō clan from the Azuchi–Momoyama to Edo periods. He rose from relatively humble origins as an ashigaru (a light foot soldier) to become a daimyō.

During his lifetime he changed his feudal master seven times and worked for ten people, but in the end he rendered loyalty to Tokugawa Ieyasu, who became his last master.

Tōdō Takatora is famous for excellence in castle design. He is said to have been involved in building as many as twenty castles, including Edo Castle, Wakayama Castle, Uwajima Castle, Imabari Castle, Iga Ueno Castle and Sasayama Castle.

It is mentioned in the historical records that Tōdō Takatora was a large man with around 190 cm in height. After his death, historical records stated that Takatora's body was covered with lesions and battle scars, and some of his fingers were torn off and had no nails.

== Biography ==
Tōdō Takatora was born in 1556 in Ōmi Province. The precise place of his birthplace was in Tōdō village, Inukami-gun, east of Lake Biwa.

Takatora hailed from a Tōdō clan branch which descended from a samurai named Kagemori Todo who served an imperial court noble in the 14th century.

Takatora started working for Azai Nagamasa at the age of 15. He participated in his first battle in the battle of Anegawa in 1570 as a member of Kassho Isono's corps with his father, Torataka. He also played an active role in the attack on Usayama Castle and received a letter of commendation and was given a wakizashi from Nagamasa as reward.

Sometime after the destruction of the Azai clan, Takatora then served Isono Kazumasa, the lord of Ogawa Castle, who was also a former vassal of the Azai clan. As Kazumasa's vassal, Takatora received a landholding worth 80 koku.

=== Serving the Toyotomi clan ===
In 1576, Takatora served Hashiba Hidenaga, the younger brother of Hashiba Hideyoshi, a senior vassal of Nobunaga, and was granted a smallholding worth 300 koku. At this time, he changed his surname to Yoemon.

In October 1577, when Hidenaga led 3,000 soldiers to march into Tajima, Takatora succeeded in a surprise attack and subdued Takeda Castle with the help of a guide. Takatora was immediately awarded with additional lands worth 1,000 koku, and was appointed to lead ashigaru infantry. However, when Takatora led 120 cavalrymen to attack the resistance forces from Tochiya Castle, Takatora's units suffered heavy casualties.

In 1580, during the Siege of Miki, Takatora personally killed the commander of Bessho Nagaharu's 300 horsemen, Kago Rokuroemon. Takatora was also recorded seizing the mount of Rokuroemon, a jet black colored horse.

In 1581, he was tasked with suppressing a rebellion of local clans in Tajima Province. His domain holdings was increased by 3,000 koku, and he was promoted as commander of a musketeer unit.

In 1583, Takatora participated in the campaign of Shizugatake on the side of Toyotomi. He fought in the Chugoku region where he managed to beat and rout the troops of Sakuma Nobumori. For his service in this campaign, Takatora was rewarded with additional holdings of domains worth 1,300 koku.

In 1585, Takatora participated in the Toyotomi conquest of Kishu. He managed to defeat Yukawa Naoharu and Yamamoto Shuzen in October. After the war, Takatora was given more fiefs of Kokawa, Wakayama in Kii Province, which were worth 10,000 koku. He also was appointed as 'commissioner' for the construction of Saruokayama Castle and Wakayama Castle. In the same year, he made contributions in the Invasion of Shikoku, and was awarded further land domains worth 5,400 by Hideyoshi.

In 1586, Hideyoshi, who became Kanpaku or Regent, instructed Hidenaga to build a mansion in Jurakudai as a residence for Tokugawa Ieyasu, who was to go to Kyoto for an audience with Hideyoshi, and Hidenaga appointed Takatora as Commissioner of Construction. Takatora was assigned as the chief designer to build the mansion. Then, on his own initiative, Takatora changed the design as he cited the security concerns from the original blueprints he was given and paid the additional cost of the project. Later, when Ieyasu inspected the design and asked him why the mansion residence was different to the original blueprint, Takatora answered that if Ieyasu felt dissatisfied with the changes Takatora made, Ieyasu was free to reconstruct the mansion. However, Ieyasu said that he was instead satisfied with Takatora's design.

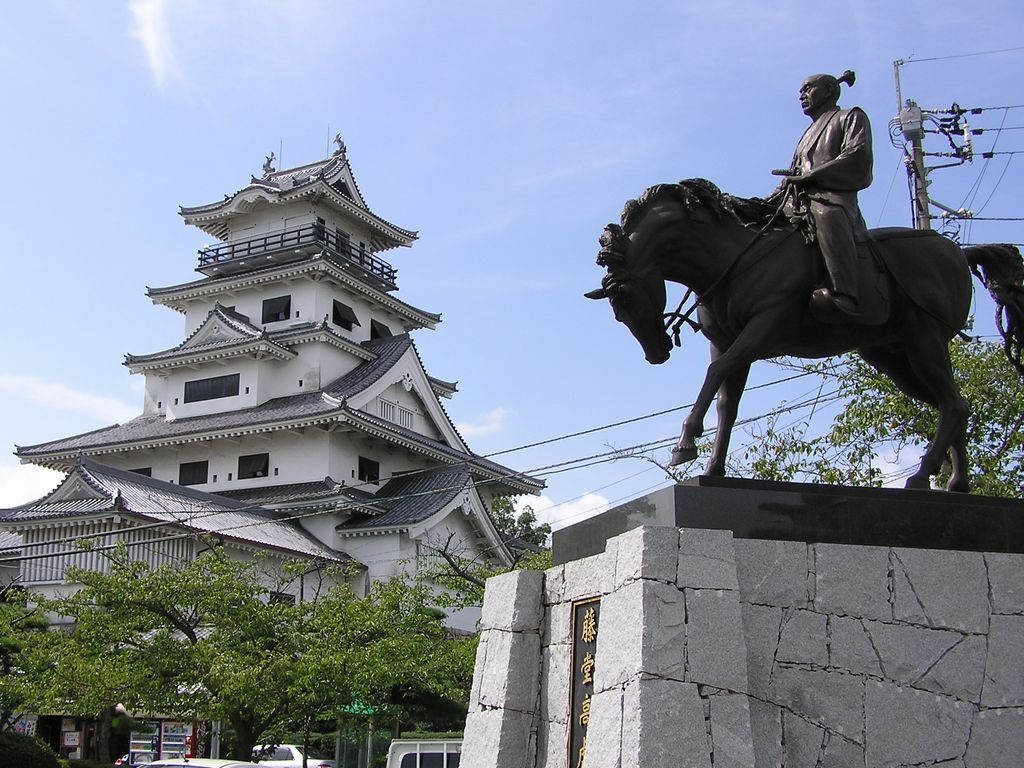
Statue of Tōdō Takatora at Imabari Castle.

In 1587, Takatora participated in the Toyotomi Kyūshū campaign to subjugate Kyushu. He played a distinguished role at the Battle of Nejirasaka against the Shimazu clan, where he managed to rescue another Toyotomi general named Miyabe Keijun from danger. For his military exploits at this battle, Takatora domains were increased to 20,000 koku. Later, Takatora was further recommended by Hideyoshi and appointed to Sado no kami (Senior Fifth Rank Lower Grade).

In 1589, he built Akagi Castle (present-day Kiwa-cho, Kumano City, Mie Prefecture) as a base for suppressing the Kitayama Uprising. Many farmers were also beheaded at Tahirako Pass by Takatora.

In 1591, after Hidenaga died, Takatora served under Hideyoshi, participating in the invasions of Korea as a "Fleet Commander" of the Toyotomi navy. His fiefdom at that time was Iyo-Uwajima.

In 1595, after the death of Toyotomi Hidetsugu, Takatora decided to become a monk and went up to Mount Kōya. However, Hideyoshi did not want Takatora to waste his talent and ordered Ikoma Chikamasa to summon Takatora, so he returned to secular life, was given an additional 50,000 koku, and moved to Iyo. Soon, he was also further given land in Kokuitajima (present-day Uwajima City), totalling his domain possessions to be worth 70,000 koku.

In 1597 during the second Korean campaign, Takatora participated in the Battle of Myeongnyang, where he was wounded in action.

Takatora also furthered his success in annihilating the naval force led by the Korean navy's military commander Wŏn Kyun at the Battle of Chilcheollyang. After returning to Japan, he had added 10,000 koku to Ozu Castle, bringing it to 80,000 koku. (Note: According to Hideyoshi's red seal letter dated June 23, which stated on Sakuragi's "Takayama" chronicle. It is assumed that Sakuragi was appointed as the Governor-General of Naval Ships on June 26 and was given a curtain and a warship.)

=== Serving the Tokugawa clan ===
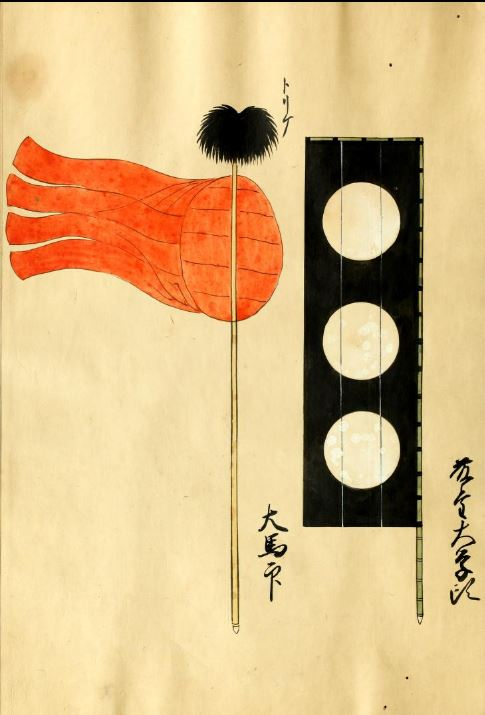
Todo Takatora banner and battle standard

Before the clash between Tokugawa Ieyasu's Eastern Army and Ishida Mitsunari's Western Army in Sekigahara, Takatora sent his family to Edo as a sign of allegiance to Ieyasu.

In 1600, at the Battle of Sekigahara, although he was one of Toyotomi's main generals, he sided with Tokugawa Ieyasu's Eastern Army. During the battle, Takatora's units engaged the units of Ōtani Yoshitsugu of the Western Army. However, when Kobayakawa Hideaki's army attacked Yoshitsugu from the west, Yoshitsugu lost his ground and is said to have committed suicide. With the Eastern Army progressing, Takatora led his troops further to the high ground location where troops of the Western Army's supreme leader, Mitsunari, was positioned. The Ietada Nikki records; Shima Sakon's fourth son, Shima Kiyomasa within Yoshitsugu's ranks, tried to kill Takatora in one blow, however he was struck down and killed by an Eastern Army general named Takagi Heizaburō.

After the victory of Tokugawa forces in Sekigahara, Takatora further advanced his troops for the mop up operations against daimyo lords which sided with the Ishida faction. First he suppressed the resistance of Mōri Terumoto's vassals in Iyo Province, then he also managed to convince Ieyasu giving pardon to former Terumoto generals such as Wakisaka Yasuharu, Ogawa Suketada, Kutsuki Mototsuna, and Akaza Naoyasu. After the war, Takatora was given a larger fiefdom, Iyo-Imabari, assessed at 200,000 koku.

=== Edo period ===
During the Edo period, the wealth of each fiefdom was measured as a volume of rice production in koku. Iyo-Uwajima was assessed at 70,000 koku. Starting from 1601, Takatora spent six years rebuilding Itajima Castle, which would later be called Uwajima Castle. Following that, Takatora also further increased his total possession of domains to 203,000 koku. Takatora's landholdings were further increased with additional territories in Iga Province, bringing his total worth of domains to 270,000 koku.

In 1604, Takatora and Date Masamune advised the Shogunate government to introduce a rule across Japan that each feudal lord was obliged to maintain a residence in Edo, the capital of the Shogunate, which was immediately accepted and implemented officially.

Later in 1608, Takatora was assigned control of Tsu (with landholdings in Iga and Ise), which at first was worth 220,000 koku, before growing further in productivity to the total revenue of 320,000 koku. It was reported that the landholdings which Takatora received in Iga Province previously belonged to a lord named Tsutsui Sadatsugu, which Ieyasu stripped off and gave the rights to Takatora. The initial pretext was because of Sadatsugu's sloppy governance of the domain. However, historians argue that the reasons were because Sadatsugu behaved suspiciously by visiting Toyotomi Hideyori at Osaka Castle, without the Shogunate's approval, whilst the land which Sadatsugu occupied was considered as an important strategic military location. Furthermore, it was thought that Ieyasu stripped the land and gave it to the Tōdō clan as political strategy against the Toyotomi clan, as despite his patronage to the Toyotomi family, Tōdō Takatora was considered as a close ally of Ieyasu. Thus, by making him control the portions of Iga Province, it could push more strategic locations to the influence of the Shogunate without directly provoking the Toyotomi faction in Osaka.

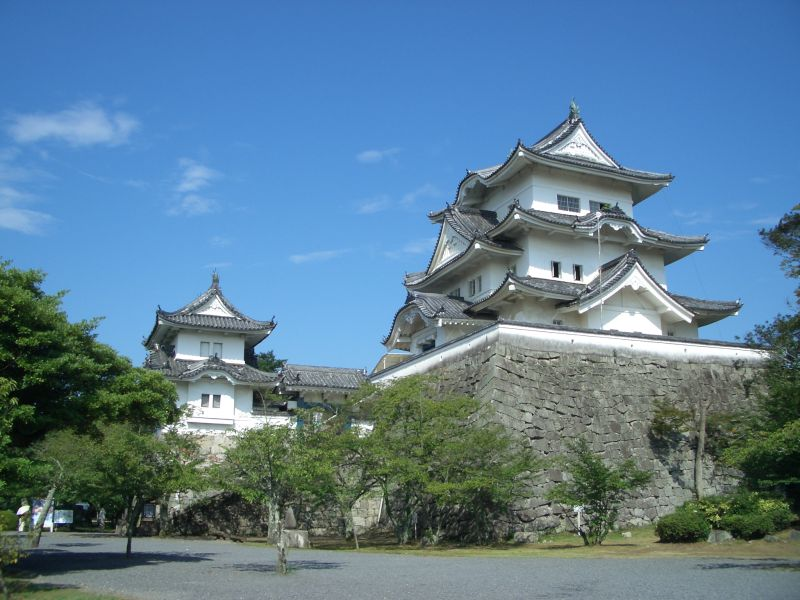
Reconstructed tenshu of Iga Ueno Castle

Later in 1609, Takatora completed the renovation of Iga Ueno Castle into a newly built layered tower-style castle. Takatora was also entrusted to renovate the Kameyama Castle in Tanba-Kameyama Domain, Kyoto. The constructions and renovation of numerous castles were thought to be a preparation of the incoming potential conflicts against Toyotomi Hideyori of Osaka Castle and any feudal lords who were potentially siding with him, including castles built by Takatora.

In Iga Province, it was reported that Tōdō Takatora employed the Iga-ryū ninja. Aside from ninja, he also employed local clans of Iga Province as "musokunin", which is a class of part-time samurai who had been allowed to retain their clan name but did not have land. The musokunin also worked as farmers during peace, while they are obliged to take arms in the time of war.

in 1614, Takatora participated in the winter phase of the siege of Osaka, aiding the Tokugawa shogunate. He mobilized the musokunin army from Iga Province to besiege Osaka Castle.

In 1615, during the summer phase of the Osaka campaign, Takatora participated in the Battle of Yao where he crushed the army of Chōsokabe Morichika.

After the Osaka campaign, he gained another 50,000 koku in 1617 in southern Ise, to which he added 3000 koku in Shimōsa Province which were originally the patrimony of his younger brother. His total holdings of 323,000 koku were the ninth largest in Japan, excluding the shimpan Tokugawa and Matsudaira domains.

In 1619, Tokugawa Yorinobu was transferred to Wakayama Castle, and the 50,000 koku Tamaru region of southern Ise was transferred from Tsu to Kii Domain; however, Tōdō Takatora received equivalent holdings in Yamato and Yamashiros as compensation.

On October 5, 1630, Tōdō Takatora died at his residence in Edo. He was 74 years old.

== Popular culture ==
=== Films ===
- Portrayed by Kim Myung-gon in the 2014 film The Admiral: Roaring Currents.

=== Comics ===
- A fictionalized version of Todo (renamed "Todo Tokotora") appears in the 2009 comic miniseries Yi Soon Shin: Warrior and Defender, where he is shown in a lover's relationship with fellow general Gurijima Michiyuki. Gurijima's death during the Battle of Hansando becomes Todo's primary motivation to eliminate Yi.

=== Video games ===
- Takatora is a playable character in the Samurai Warriors franchise debuting in Sengoku Musou Chronicle 2nd. In Samurai Warriors 4, he is portrayed as an Azai retainer and a close friend of Ōtani Yoshitsugu before joining the Toyotomi.

== Appendix ==
=== Bibliography ===
==== Historical sources ====
- Historical Research Association (Japan) (1966). 日本史年表 [Japanese History Chronology] (in Japanese). Historical Study Group.
- 籔, 景三 (1985). 筒井順慶とその一族 [Junkei Tsutsui and his family] (in Japanese). 新人物往来社. pp. 213–4. ISBN 4-404-01281-0.
- Kenji Fukui (2008), 藤堂高虎文書集 [Collection of Documents by Tōdō Takatora] (in Japanese), Iga Cultural and Industrial Association
- Kenji Fukui (2016). 図説日本の城郭シリーズ④ 築城の名手藤堂高虎 [Illustrated Series on Japanese Castles Vol. 4: Tōdō Takatora, Master Castle Builder] (in Japanese). Ebisukosyo publication. ISBN 978-4-86403-225-4.
- Kenji Fukui (2018). 藤堂高虎論 [Todo Takatora theory] (in Japanese). 塙書房. ISBN 978-4-8273-1296-6.
- Kōta Kodama (1980). Tsuboi (Japanese archaeologist), Kiyotari (ed.). 日本城郭大系 第10巻 三重・奈良・和歌山 [Japanese Castle Series Volume 10 Mie, Nara, Wakayama]. 新人物往来社.
- Nakayama, Yoshiaki (2015). 江戸三百藩大全 全藩藩主変遷表付. Kosaido Publishing. ISBN 978-4331802946.(in Japanese)
- Sakuragi Kendo (1913). Kendo, Sakuragi (ed.). 高山公 (in Japanese). 伊勢新聞社活版部.
- Stephen Turnbull (2012). Osaka 1615 The Last Battle of the Samurai. Bloomsbury Publishing. ISBN 9781846037993.
- Tatsuo, Fujita (2018). 藤堂高虎論 -初期藩政史の研究 [Todo Takatora Theory - Research on the history of early feudal government]. 塙書房. ISBN 978-4827312966.
- Tatsuo Fujita (2006). 江戸時代の設計者―異能の武将・藤堂高虎― [Architect of the Edo Period: Takatora Todo, a Warlord with Extraordinary Talents]. 講談社現代新書. 講談社. ISBN 4061498304.
- Toshio G. Tsukahira (1966). Feudal Control in Tokugawa Japan. Brill. ISBN 978-1-68417-151-4.
- Tōdō family information (25 Sept. 2007) (in Japanese)
- Glenn, Chris (September 2022). The Samurai Castle Master: Warlord Todo Takatora. Pen & Sword Books Limited. ISBN 9781399096584.

=== External links ===
- Momoyama, Japanese Art in the Age of Grandeur, an exhibition catalog from The Metropolitan Museum of Art (fully available online as PDF), which contains material on Tōdō Takatora

Preceded by none	First Daimyō of Imabari; 1600–1608	Succeeded by Matsudaira Sadafusa
Preceded by Tomita Nobutaka	First Daimyō of Tsu; 1608–1630	Succeeded by Tōdō Takatsugu
