= Tsu Domain =

Feudal domain in Edo-period Japan

Tsu Domain 津藩
- under Tokugawa shogunate Japan
- 1601–1871
- Flag
- Capital: Tsu Castle
- Area
  - Coordinates: 34°43′3.96″N 136°30′27.57″E
- Government
  - Type: Daimyō
- Historical era: Edo period
  - Established: 1601
  - Disestablished: 1871
- Today part of: part of Mie Prefecture

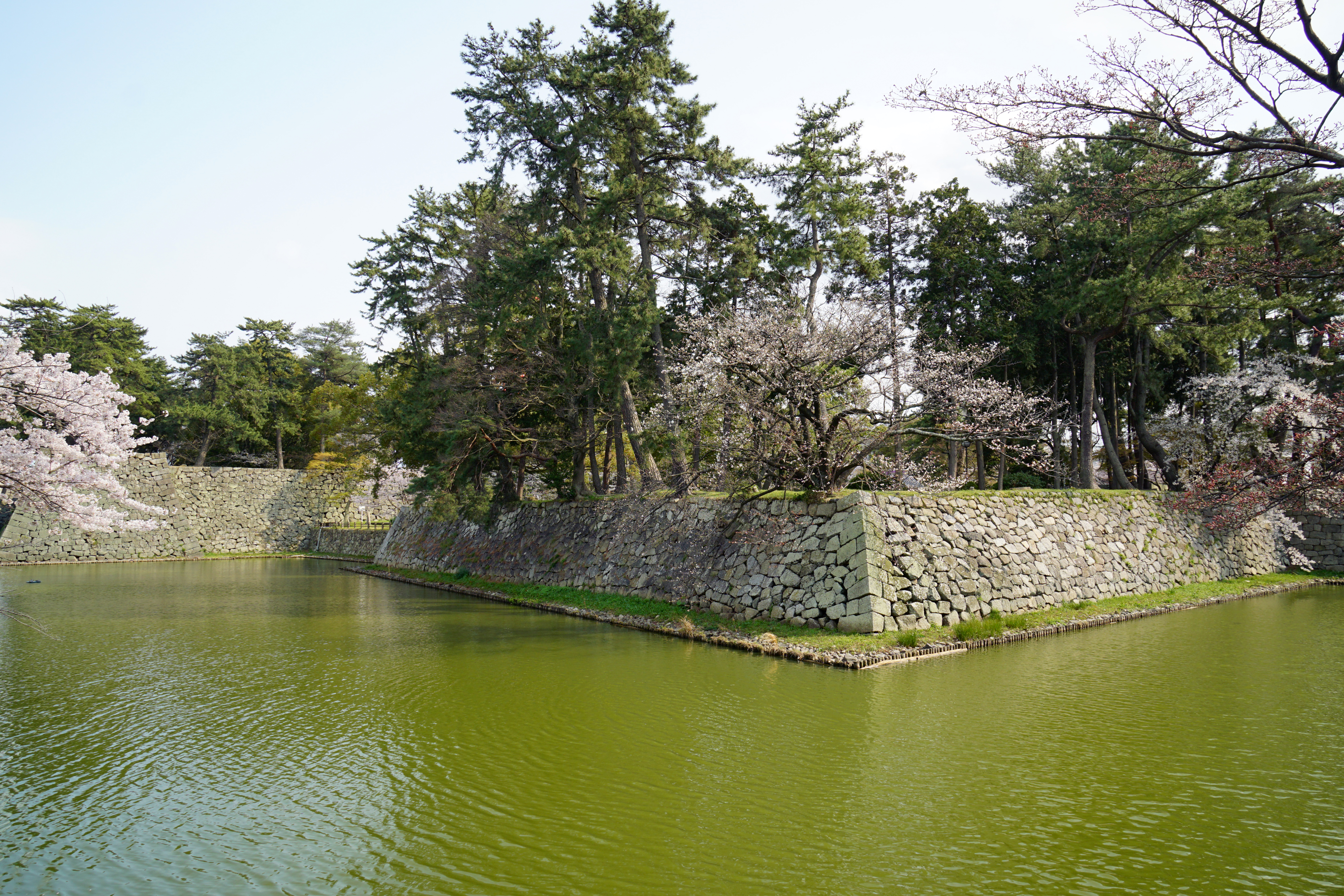
Ruins of Tsu Castle

Tsu Domain (津藩, Tsu-han) was a feudal domain under the Tokugawa shogunate of Edo period Japan, located in Ise Province and in Iga Province in what is part of now modern-day Tsu, Mie. It was centered around Tsu Castle. Tsu Domain was controlled by the tozama Tōdō clan throughout most of its history.

== History ==
Tsu was known as "Anotsu" during the Sengoku period and was controlled by the Kudo clan, who were originally from Shinano Province. Oda Nobunaga's invasion of Ise in 1568 was resolved by the Kudo clan adopting Nobunaga's younger brother, Oda Nobukane as heir. Following Nobunaga's death, Nobukane swore fealty to Toyotomi Hideyoshi; however, in 1594 he was transferred to Ōmi Province. Hideyoshi assigned the territory to Tomita Tomonobu, with a kokudaka of 50,000 koku. On his death in 1599, he was succeeded by his son, Tomita Nobutaka, who approached Tokugawa Ieyasu. He assisted Ieyasu in the invasion of Aizu, but was later defeated at the Battle of Aonutsu Castle by a pro-Toyotomi coalition. Following the 1600 Battle of Sekigahara, Tokugawa Ieyasu reinstated Tomita Nobukane as daimyō of Tsu Domain, with an increase in kokudaka to 70,000 koku. He was transferred to Uwajima Domain in Iyo Province in 1608.

The domain was then given to Tōdō Takatora, with a kokudaka of 220,000 koku. Although a tozama daimyō, Tōdō Takatora received special treatment from Tokugawa Ieyasu from an early stage, and had been entrusted with the construction of Edo Castle. He also performed well during the Siege of Osaka and his holdings were increased with additional territories in Iga Province, bringing his total to 270,000 koku. He gained another 50,000 koku in 1617 in southern Ise, to which he added 3000 koku in Shimōsa Province which were originally the patrimony of his younger brother. His total holdings of 323,000 koku were the ninth largest in Japan, excluding the shimpan Tokugawa and Matsudaira domains. In 1619 Tokugawa Yorinobu was transferred to Wakayama Castle, and the 50,000 koku Tamaru region of southern Ise was transferred from Tsu to Kii Domain; however, Tōdō Takatora received equivalent holdings in Yamato and Yamashiro Provinces in compensation. However, on the retirement of Tōdō Takatsugu in 1669, 50,000 koku of his holdings were split off to allow his second son to establish a cadet branch of the clan at Hisai Domain. Another 3000 koku were given to a third son, leaving the 3rd daimyō, Tōdō Takahisa, with an inheritance of 270,950 koku. The domain was often beset by natural disasters, including three large earthquakes, and bad harvests, which kept the domain's finances on precarious footing. A major peasant uprising occurred during the tenure of the 9th daimyō, Tōdō Takamine. The 10th daimyō, Tōdō Takasato succeeded with fiscal reforms, and encouraged forestry and sericulture. He also established the han school "Yuzoukan," at Tsu, and the branch "Chouhirodo," in Iga, in which study of the various schools of Japanese swordsmanship were promoted.

The situation deteriorated again under the 11th daimyō, Tōdō Takayuki, and natural disasters such as bad harvests and earthquakes occurred one after another, driving the domain deeply into debt. With the start of the Boshin War, he proclaimed the domain's neutrality, stating that he refused to participate in what he viewed as a private feud between Satsuma and Aizu. However, after the Battle of Toba-Fushimi, he was visited by a messenger from Emperor Meiji, and his local commanders decided to assist the Satchō Alliance by attacking the retreating shogunate forces. This contributed greatly to then imperial victory, and greatly demoralized the Tokugawa forces who were shocked at Tsu Domain's sudden defection. The forces of Tsu Domain served in the vanguard of the imperial advance down the Tōkaidō. In 1868, Tōdō Takayuki was appointed imperial governor of Tsu, but there was much local dissatisfaction with his rule and numerous uprisings until his retirement in 1871. The final daimyō, Tōdō Takakiyo, served only a few weeks as imperial governor before the abolition of the han system.

== Holdings at the end of the Edo period ==
As with most domains in the han system, Tsu Domain consisted of several discontinuous territories calculated to provide the assigned kokudaka, based on periodic cadastral surveys and projected agricultural yields.

- Ise Province
  - 15 villages in Mie District
  - 29 villages in Kawawa District
  - 3 villages in Suzuka District
  - 73 villages in Anō District
  - 56 villages in Ichishi District
  - 33 villages in Iino District
  - 20 villages in Taki District
- Yamashiro Province
  - 14 villages in Sōraku District
- Yamato Province
  - 42 villages in Soekami District
  - 9 villages in Shikijō District
  - 24 villages in Toichi District
  - 59 villages in Yamabe District
- Iga Province (entire province)
  - 69 villages in Ahai District
  - 26 villages in Yamada District
  - 41 villages in Nabari District
  - 61 villages in Iga District

== List of daimyō ==
#	Name	Tenure	Courtesy title	Court Rank	kokudaka
Tomita clan, 1600-1608 (tozama)
1	Tomita Kazunobu (富田一白)	1549 - 1599	Sakone-no-shogen (左近将監)	Junior 5th Rank, Lower Grade (従五位下)	50,000 koku
2	Tomita Nobutaka (富田信高)	1599 - 1608	Shinano-no-kami (信濃守)	Junior 4th Rank, Lower Grade (従四位下)	50,000 ->70,000 koku
Tōdō clan, 1610-1615 (fudai)
1	Tōdō Takatora (藤堂高虎)	1608 - 1630	Izumi-no-kami (和泉守)	Junior 4th Rank, Lower Grade (従四位下)	220,950 ->270,950 -> 323,950 koku
2	Tōdō Takatsugu (藤堂高次)	1630 - 1669	Izumi-no-kami (和泉守)	Junior 4th Rank, Lower Grade (従四位下)	323,950 koku
3	Tōdō Takahisa (藤堂高久)	1669 - 1703	Izumi-no-kami (和泉守)	Junior 4th Rank, Lower Grade (従四位下)	323,950-> 270,950 koku
4	Tōdō Takahisa (藤堂高睦)	1703 - 1708	Izumi-no-kami (和泉守); Jijū (侍従)	Junior 4th Rank, Lower Grade (従四位下)	270,950 koku
5	Tōdō Takayoshi (藤堂高敏)	1708 - 1728	Izumi-no-kami (和泉守); Jijū (侍従)	Junior 4th Rank, Lower Grade (従四位下)	270,950 koku
6	Tōdō Takaharu (藤堂高治)	1728 - 1735	Daigaku-no-kami (大学頭)	Junior 4th Rank, Lower Grade (従四位下)	270,950 koku
7	Tōdō Takahora (藤堂高朗)	1735 - 1769	Izumi-no-kami (和泉守)	Junior 4th Rank, Lower Grade (従四位下)	270,950 koku
8	Tōdō Takanaga (藤堂高悠)	1769 - 1770	Izumi-no-kami (和泉守); Jijū (侍従)	Junior 4th Rank, Lower Grade (従四位下)	270,950 koku
9	Tōdō Takasato (藤堂高嶷)	1770 - 1806	Izumi-no-kami (和泉守)	Junior 4th Rank, Lower Grade (従四位下)	270,950 koku
10	Tōdō Takasawa (藤堂高兌)	1806 - 1824	Izumi-no-kami (和泉守)	Junior 4th Rank, Lower Grade (従四位下)	270,950 koku
11	Tōdō Takayuki (藤堂高猷)	1825 - 1871	Izumi-no-kami (和泉守); Jijū (侍従)	2nd Rank (正二位)	270,950 koku
12	Tōdō Takakiyo (藤堂高潔)	1871 - 1871	Daigaku-no-kami (大学頭)	3rd Rank (従三位)	270,950 koku

== Genealogy (simplified) ==
- Tōdō Torataka, an ashigaru.
  - I.Takatora, 1st daimyō of Tsu (cr. 1608) (1556–1630; r. 1608–1630)
    - II. Takatsugu, 2nd daimyō of Tsu (1602–1676; r. 1630–1669)
      - III. Takahisa, 3rd daimyō of Tsu (1638–1703; r. 1669–1703).
      - Takamichi, 1st daimyō of Hisai (cr. 1669) (1644–1697)
        - V. Takatoshi, 5th daimyō of Tsu (1693–1728; r. 1708–1728)
      - IV. Takachika, 4th daimyō of Tsu (1667–1708; r. 1703–1708)
  - Takakiyo (1585–1640)
    - Takahide
      - Takaaki (1645–1711)
        - Takatake
          - VII. Takaaki, 7th daimyō of Tsu (1717–1785; r. 1735–1769)
            - VIII. Takanaga, 8th daimyō of Tsu (1751–1770; r. 1769–1770).
            - IX. Takasato, 9th daimyō of Tsu (1746–1806; r. 1770–1806)
              - X. Takasawa, 10th daimyō of Tsu (1781–1825; r. 1806–1824)
                - XI. Takayuki, 11th daimyō of Tsu (1813–1895; r. 1825–1869)
                  - Takakiyo, 20th family head, 1st Count (1837–1889; Governor of Tsu: 1869–1871, Count: 1884)
                    - Takatsugu, 21st family head, 2nd Count (1884–1943; 21st family head and 2nd Count: 1889–1943)
                      - Takatei, 22nd family head, 3rd Count (1917–1946; 22nd family head and 3rd Count: 1943–1946)
                        - Takamasa, 23rd family head, 4th Count (b. 1944; 23rd family head and 4th Count: 1946–1947; 23rd family head: 1947–present)
                          - Takahito (b. 1972)
        - VI. Takaharu, 6th daimyō of Tsu (1710–1735; r. 1728–1735)

== See also ==
- List of Han
- Abolition of the han system
- Hisai Domain
