= Tōdō Takakiyo =

Junior Third Rank Count Tōdō Takakiyo
- 藤堂 高潔
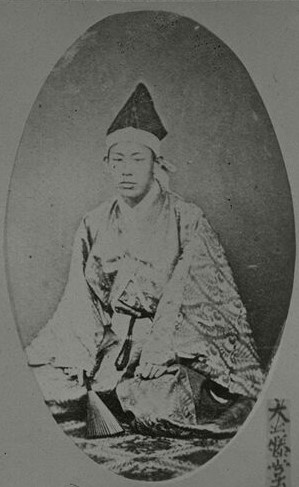
- Tōdō Takakiyo, post-Meiji restoration
- Preceded by: Tōdō Takayuki
- Succeeded by: -- none--

Imperial Governor of Tsu
- In office 1871–1871
- Monarch: Emperor Meiji

Personal details
- Born: October 19, 1837
- Died: November 18, 1889 (aged 52); Tokyo, Japan
- Parent: Tōdō Takayuki (father)

Count Tōdō Takakiyo (藤堂 高潔; October 19, 1837 – November 18, 1889) was the 12th and final daimyō of Tsu Domain under the Bakumatsu period Tokugawa Shogunate of Japan. He was the 20th hereditary chieftain of the Tōdō clan.

== Biography ==
Tōdō Takakiyo was born in 1837 as the eldest son of the previous daimyō of Tsu Domain, Tōdō Takayuki; his mother was from the Hashimoto clan. In 1849, he was awarded the courtesy titles of Daigaku-no-kami and jijū and Lower Fourth court rank. In 1863, he was sent to Kyoto in place of his father to attend to Emperor Kōmei as the nominal head of the domain’s forces sent to help suppress pro-sonnō jōi rebels during the Tenchūgumi Incident. He was awarded with the ceremonial courtesy title of Captain of the Left Imperial Guards (左近衛権少将) by the grateful emperor the following year.

At the start of the Boshin War of the Meiji Restoration, the samurai of the domain were divided between factions which supported the Shogunate, and those who supported the concept of Kōbu gattai; however, sentiment towards to shogunate was only lukewarm. During the Battle of Toba–Fushimi, forces of Tsu Domain initially supported the shogunate, but switched sides in the course of the battle, contributing strongly to the defeat of the pro-shogunate forces. Tsu Domain subsequently contributed forces to other battles of the Boshin War, including the Battle of Hakodate on the side of the new Meiji government.

In 1868, Takakiyo was part of the guard to Emperor Meiji in his first pilgrimage to the Ise Grand Shrine. On June 28, 1871, Tōdō Takayuki officially retired due to ill health, and Takakiyo was appointed imperial governor of Tsu, as the former title of daimyō had been abolished by the new Meiji government. However, with the abolition of the han system only a month later, his position was abolished, and he relocated to Tokyo. With the establishment of kazoku peerage on July 8, 1884, he was made a count (hakushaku). He predeceased his father at the age of 53 in 1889 and was posthumously awarded Junior third court rank.

Tōdō Takakiyo studied painting under Watanabe Kazan and was noted for his flower paintings. He was also noted for calligraphy. He was married to a daughter of Hachisuka Narimasa of Tokushima Domain.
