= Tōdō clan =

Japanese samurai clan

Tōdō clan 藤堂
- Family crest mon of the Tōdō clan
- Home province: Ōmi Province
- Titles: daimyō of Tsu Domain
- Founder: Tōdō Takatora
- Final ruler: Tōdō Takakiyo
- Founding year: 1585
- Ruled until: 1871 (abolishment of the han system)

The Tōdō clan (Japanese: 藤堂氏, Hepburn: Tōdō-shi) was a Japanese samurai clan of humble origins from the Inukami District of Ōmi Province. Under Hideyoshi, Tōdō ruled Uwajima at Iyo province. During the Edo period, the Tōdō ruled most of Ise Province and all of Iga Province as daimyō (feudal lords) of Tsu Domain (320,000 koku) under the Tokugawa shogunate.

== History ==
The clan initially rose to prominence under Tōdō Takatora (1556–1630), who was a highly trusted commander under Hashiba Hidenaga, later Toyotomi Hideyoshi and Tokugawa Ieyasu, as well as an architect of numerous Japanese castles.

During the Bakumatsu period, the defection of the Tōdō clan to the Satchō Alliance in 1868 was a major factor in the defeat of the Tokugawa forces at the Battle of Toba–Fushimi. The head of the clan was later awarded with the kazoku title of Count (hakushaku) by the Meiji government.

A junior branch of the clan, which ruled Hisai Domain in Ise Province (53,000 koku), was awarded the title of viscount (shishaku) in the Meiji period. Another junior branch of the clan, which ruled Nabari in Iga Province (15,000 koku), was not styled as a daimyo, but was awarded the title of baron (danshaku) in the Meiji period.
