= Ise Province =

Former province of Japan

Map of Japanese provinces (1868) with Ise Province highlighted

Ise Province (伊勢国, Ise no Kuni; Japanese pronunciation: [í.sè̞ (nò̞ kɯ̈̀.ɲ̟ì)]) was a province of Japan that covered most of the area of modern-day Mie Prefecture. Ise bordered on Iga, Kii, Mino, Ōmi, Owari, Shima, and Yamato Provinces. Its abbreviated form name was Seishū (勢州).

== History ==
The name of Ise appears in the earliest written records of Japan, and was the site of numerous religious and folkloric events connected with the Shinto religion and Yamato court. Ise province was one of the original provinces of Japan established in the Nara period under the Taihō Code, when the former princely state of Ise was divided into Ise, Iga and Shima. The original capital of the province was located in what is now the city of Suzuka, and was excavated by archaeologists in 1957. The site was proclaimed a national historic landmark in 1986. The remains of the Ise kokubunji have also been found within the boundaries of modern Suzuka. Under the Engishiki classification system, Ise was ranked as a "great country" (大国) and a "close country" (近国).

Two Shinto shrines in Ise Province compete for the title of Ichinomiya: Tsubaki Grand Shrine and the Tsubaki Jinja, both of which are located in Suzuka. The Ise Grand Shrine, located in what is now the city of Ise was the destination of pilgrims from the Heian period through modern times.

During the Muromachi period, Ise was ruled nominally by the Kitabatake clan. After the establishment of the Tokugawa shogunate, Ise was divided into several feudal han, the largest of which was Tsu Domain. During the Edo period, the Tōkaidō road from Edo to Kyoto passed through northern Ise, with post stations at several locations.

At the time of the Bakumatsu period, the feudal domains within Ise Province included the following:

Domains in Ise Province
Domain	Daimyō	Revenue (koku)	Type
Tsu Domain	Todo	279,500	fudai
Hisai Domain	Todo	58,700	fudai
Kuwana Domain	Matsudaira (Hisamatsu)	113,000	shimpan
Ise-Kameyama Domain	Ishikawa	60,000	fudai
Nagashima Domain	Masuyama	20,000	fudai
Kanbe Domain	Honda	10,000	fudai
Komono Domain	Hijikata	10,000	tozama
Tamaru Domain	Kunō	10,000	fudai

After the start of the Meiji period, with the abolition of the han system in 1871, Ise was joined with former Iga and Shima provinces to form the new Mie Prefecture formally created on April 18, 1876.

The name "Ise Province" continued to exist as a geographical anachronism for certain official purposes. For example, Ise is explicitly recognized in treaties in 1894 (a) between Japan and the United States and (b) between Japan and the United Kingdom.

The World War II Japanese battleship Ise and modern helicopter carrier Ise are named after this province.

== Historical districts ==
- Mie Prefecture
  - Anki District (奄芸郡) – merged with Kawawa District to become Kawage District (河芸郡) on March 29, 1896; which it merged with Anō District to become Age District (安芸郡) on September 30, 1956
  - Anō District (安濃郡) – merged with Kawage District to become Age District on September 30, 1956
  - Asake District (朝明郡) – merged into Mie District on March 29, 1896
  - Ichishi District (一志郡) – dissolved
  - Iino District (飯野郡) – merged with Iitaka District to become Iinan District (飯南郡) on March 29, 1896
  - Iitaka District (飯高郡) – merged with Iino District to become Iinan District on March 29, 1896
  - Inabe District (員弁郡)
  - Kawawa District (河曲郡) – merged with Anki District to become Kawage District on March 29, 1896; which it merged with Anō District to become Age District on September 30, 1956
  - Kuwana District (桑名郡)
  - Mie District (三重郡) – absorbed Asake District on March 29, 1896
  - Suzuka District (鈴鹿郡) – dissolved
  - Taki District (多気郡)
  - Watarai District (度会郡)

== See also ==
- Battleship Ise, a battleship of the Imperial Japanese Navy, named after the province
- Ise city
- JS Ise (DDH-182), a Japanese helicopter carrier, also named after the province
