= Yukiyoshi =

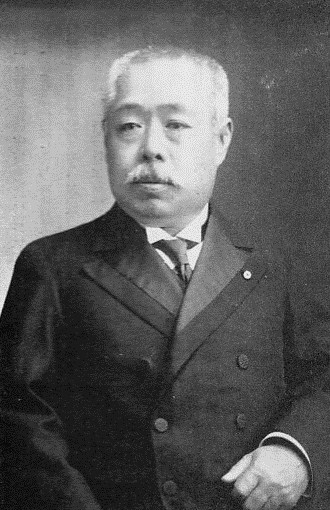
- Yukiyoshi Aoyama (1854–1930), Japanese politician
- Pronunciation: jɯkʲijoɕi (IPA)
- Gender: Male

Origin
- Origin: Japanese
- Meaning: Different meanings depending on the kanji used

Other names
- Alternative spelling: Yukiyosi (Kunrei-shiki) Yukiyosi (Nihon-shiki) Yukiyoshi (Hepburn)

Yukiyoshi is a masculine Japanese given name.

== Written forms ==
Yukiyoshi can be written using different combinations of kanji characters. Here are some examples:

- 幸義, "happiness, justice"
- 幸善, "happiness, virtuous"
- 幸吉, "happiness, good luck"
- 幸宜, "happiness, best regards"
- 行義, "to go, justice"
- 行善, "to go, virtuous"
- 行吉, "to go, good luck"
- 之義, "of, justice"
- 之善, "of, virtuous"
- 之吉, "of, good luck"
- 志義, "determination, justice"
- 志善, "determination, virtuous"
- 恭善, "respectful, virtuous"
- 恭芳, "respectful, virtuous/fragrant"
- 雪芳, "snow, virtuous/fragrant"

The name can also be written in hiragana ゆきよし or katakana ユキヨシ.

== Notable people with the name ==
- Yukiyoshi Aoki (青木 行義; 1934–1996), Japanese swimmer
- Yukiyoshi Aoyama (青山 幸宜, 1854–1930), Japanese politician and last daimyō of Gujō Domain
- Yukiyoshi Watanabe (渡邉 幸義; born 1963), Japanese businessman and writer
- Yukiyoshi Ozawa (小澤 征悦; born 1974), Japanese-American actor
