= Gujō Domain =

Gujō Domain 郡上藩
- Domain of Japan
- 1600–1871
- Capital: Gujō Hachiman Castle
  - Type: Daimyō
- Historical era: Edo period
  - Established: 1600
  - Disestablished: 1871
- Today part of: Gifu Prefecture

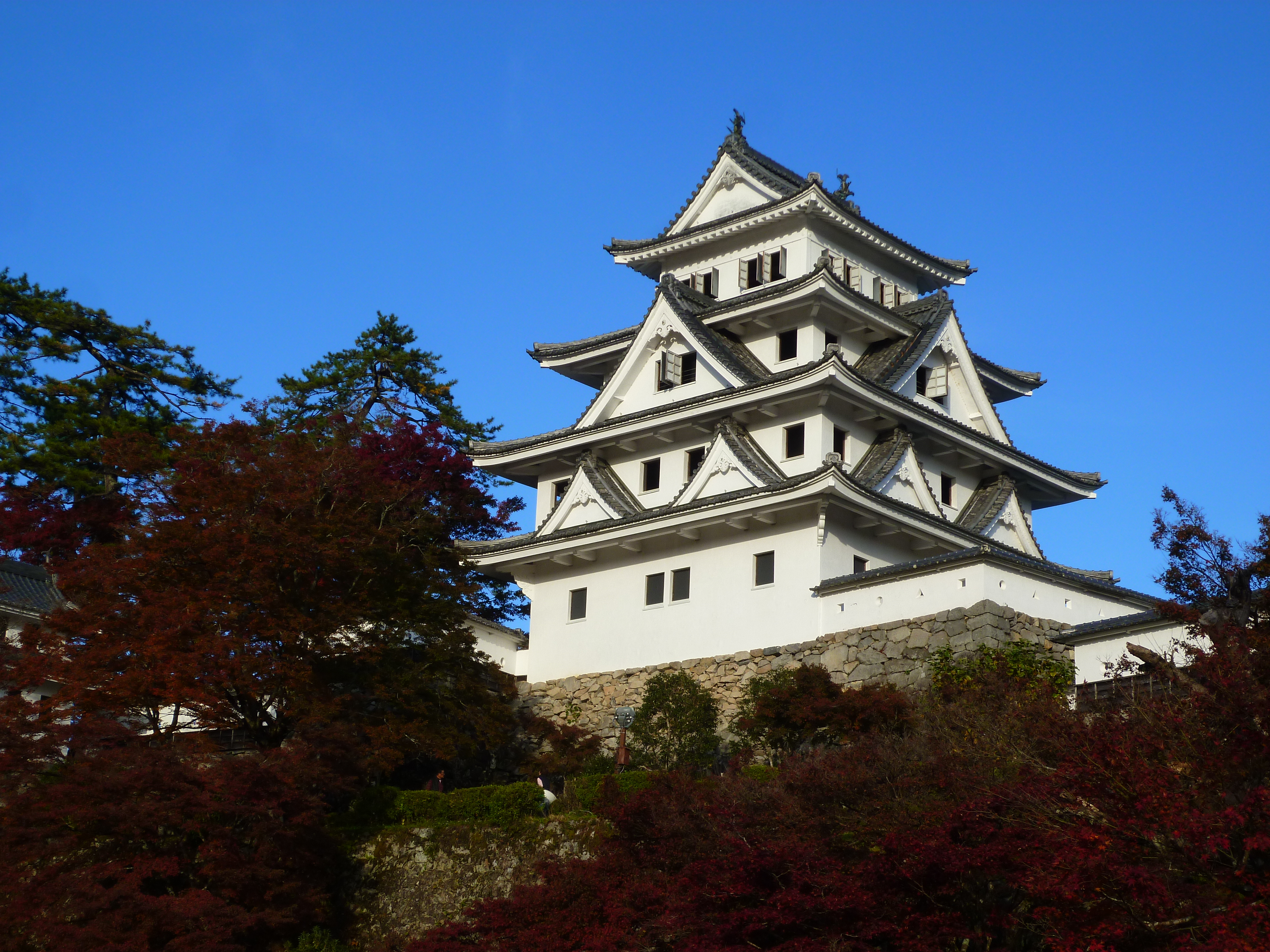
reconstructed tenshu of Gujō-Hachiman Castle

Gujō Domain (郡上藩, Gujō -han) was a fudai feudal domain of Edo period Japan. It was located in northern Mino Province and southern Echizen Province, in central Honshū. The domain was centered at Gujō Hachiman Castle, located in what is now the city of Gujō in Gifu Prefecture. For this reason, it was also called Hachiman-han (八幡藩).

== History ==
During the Sengoku period, the area around Gujō was controlled by the Endō clan, who pledged fealty to Oda Nobunaga, followed by Toyotomi Hideyoshi. Under Hideyoshi, they were reduced to serve under the Inaba clan; however, following the Battle of Sekigahara, the Inaba were transferred to Usuki Domain in Bungo Province, and the Endō clan was restored to their former territories, becoming daimyō of the 27,000 koku Gujō Domain from 1600 to 1693. The 3rd Endō daimyō, Endō Tsunetomo reduced the domain to 24,000 koku by giving 2,000 koku and 1,000 koku holdings to two of his younger brothers, but was successful in elevating his official status to that of a “castellan”. His successor, Endō Tsuneharu faced problems with peasant revolts, and his successor, Endō Tsunehisa was a minor, and died of poisoning soon after taking office. However, the Endō clan escaped attainder, and were transferred to the 10,000 koku Mikami Domain in Shimotsuke Province, where they resided to the Meiji restoration.

The Endō were replaced by a cadet branch of the Inoue clan from Kasama Domain in Hitachi Province from 1692 to 1697, with a kokudaka of 50,000 koku.

The Inoue were transferred to Kameyama Domain in Tanba Province in 1697 and were replaced by the Kanemori clan from Kamiyama Domain in Mutsu Province from 1697 to 1758 with a kokudaka set at 38,000 koku. The Kanemori faced a 4-year peasant revolt from 1754 which they were unable to suppress, and they were removed from office by the Tokugawa shogunate.

In 1758, the shogunate entrusted Gujō to the Aoyama clan, formerly of Miyazu Domain in Tango Province, with a kokudaka of 48,000 koku. The Aoyama ruled until the Meiji restoration. During the Boshin War, the domain contributed its military forces to the Satchō Alliance, although many of its samurai defected to the Tokugawa side.

In 1871, with the abolition of the han system, the domain became part of Gifu Prefecture.

== Bakumatsu period holdings ==
As with most domains in the han system, Gujō Domain consisted of a discontinuous territories calculated to provide the assigned kokudaka, based on periodic cadastral surveys and projected agricultural yields.

- Mino Province
  - 125 villages in Gujō District
- Echizen Province
  - 5 villages in Nanjō District
  - 13 villages in Nyū District
  - 69 villages in Ōno District

== List of daimyō ==
	Name	Tenure	Courtesy title	Court Rank	kokudaka
Endō clan (Fudai) 1600-1693
1	Endō Yoshitaka (遠藤慶隆)	1600-1632	Tajima-no-kami (但馬守)	Junior 5th Rank, Lower Grade (従五位下)	27,000 koku
2	Endō Yoshitoshi (遠藤慶利)	1632–1646	Tajima-no-kami (但馬守)	Junior 5th Rank, Lower Grade (従五位下)	27,000 koku
3	Endō Tsunetomo (遠藤常友)	1646–1676	Bizen-no-kami (備前守)	Junior 5th Rank, Lower Grade (従五位下)	27,000 -> 24,000 koku
4	Endō Tsuneharu (遠藤常春)	1676–1689	Emon-no-suke (右衛門佐)	Junior 5th Rank, Lower Grade (従五位下)	24,000 koku
5	Endō Tsunehisa (遠藤常久)	1689–1693	-none-	-none-	24,000 koku
Inoue clan (Fudai) 1693-1697
1	Inoue Masato (井上正任)	1692–1693	Nakatsukasa-taifu (中務大輔)	Junior 5th Rank, Lower Grade (従五位下)	50,000 koku
2	Inoue Masamine (井上正岑)	1693–1697	Kawachi-no-kami (河内守)；Jijū (侍従)	Junior 4th Rank, Lower Grade (従四位下)	50,000 koku
Kanamori clan (tozama daimyō|tozama) 1697-1758
1	Kanamori Yoritoki (金森頼時)	1697–1736	Izumo-no-kami ( 出雲守)	Junior 5th Rank, Lower Grade (従五位下)	38,000 koku
2	Kanamori Yorikane (金森頼錦))	1736–1758	Hyobu-no-suke (兵部少輔)	Junior 4th Rank, Lower Grade (従四位下)	38,000 koku
Aoyama clan (fudai) 1758-1871
1	Aoyama Yoshimichi (青山幸道)	1758–1775	Yamato-no-kami (大和守)	Junior 5th Rank, Lower Grade (従五位下)	48,000 koku
2	Aoyama Yoshisada (青山幸完)	1775–1808	Daizen-no-suke (大膳亮)	Junior 5th Rank, Lower Grade (従五位下)	48,000 koku
3	Aoyama Yukitaka (青山幸孝)	1808–1815	Okura-shoyu (大蔵少輔)	Junior 5th Rank, Lower Grade (従五位下)	48,000 koku
4	Aoyama Yukihiro (青山幸寛)	1815–1832	Daizen-no-suke (大膳亮)	Junior 5th Rank, Lower Grade (従五位下)	48,000 koku
5	Aoyama Yukinori (青山幸礼)	1832–1838	Harima-no-kami (播磨守)	Junior 5th Rank, Lower Grade (従五位下)	48,000 koku
6	Aoyama Yukishige (青山幸哉)	1838–1863	Okura-shoyu (大蔵少輔)	Junior 5th Rank, Lower Grade (従五位下)	48,000 koku
7	Aoyama Yukiyoshi (青山幸宜)	1863–1871	Daizen-no-suke (大膳亮)	Junior 5th Rank, Lower Grade (従五位下)	48,000 koku
