= Kuruwa =

Architectural element of Japanese castles

Kuruwa (曲輪; くるわ) is a Japanese term for the walls of a Japanese castle, and the regions bounded by the arrangement of those walls. The term may also be written as 郭, and the term maru (丸) is also used for castles built after the Edo period. The kuruwa serves as a defensive territory, provides space for additional castle facilities, and contains the living quarters for common soldiers, making it an important fixture of all Japanese castles. Most castles built during the Middle Ages contain many kuruwa of small area, while those built during or after the early modern period often contain a lesser number of kuruwa of larger area. The western equivalent is the motte-and-bailey.

== Arrangement ==
The shape and structure of a castle were important factors in determining the victor of castle sieges, and the castle layout, or nawabari (縄張) was arranged with the intention of giving the defender an insurmountable advantage. The kuruwa regions were planned for after the basic layout of the castle grounds was decided. The three basic kuruwa regions are the honmaru (本丸); the core of the castle, and the ninomaru (二の丸; lit. 'second circle') and sannomaru (三の丸; lit. 'third circle'), which serve as auxiliary areas.

There are three major styles of kuruwa arrangement:

Rinkaku style (輪郭式, rinkaku-shiki)
The ninomaru and sannomaru surround the honmaru at the center. This arrangement increases the castle's defense in every direction, but surrounding each kuruwa requires a large area of land to be allotted to the castle grounds. Yamagata Castle is an example of a castle that uses this arrangement.
Renkaku style (連郭式, renkaku-shiki)
The honmaru and ninomaru are arranged side by side. This causes the depth of the castle to increase, but the sides and rear of the honmaru are exposed, making the castle more vulnerable to attacks on areas other than the central gate. Matsuyama Castle and Morioka Castle both use this kuruwa arrangement.
Teikaku style (梯郭式, teikaku-shiki)
The honmaru is placed adjacent to the castle walls, and additional kuruwa are placed surrounding the honmaru. This arrangement is suited for castles built along natural barriers like swamps, rivers, mountains, or cliffs, since the natural barrier can cover the exposed side of the honmaru. Okayama Castle employs this arrangement.

Many castles use a combination of the above three styles, and may fit into multiple categories of arrangement. Some castles may not be categorizable at all. Smaller kuruwa regions called obikuruwa (帯曲輪) and koshikuruwa (腰曲輪) were sometimes placed around the central kuruwa in some arrangements. Demaru (出丸) refers to a kuruwa that is placed independent from the central kuruwa, and umadashi (馬出) refers to a kuruwa that is placed specifically to guard an important entrance. See below for more related terms.

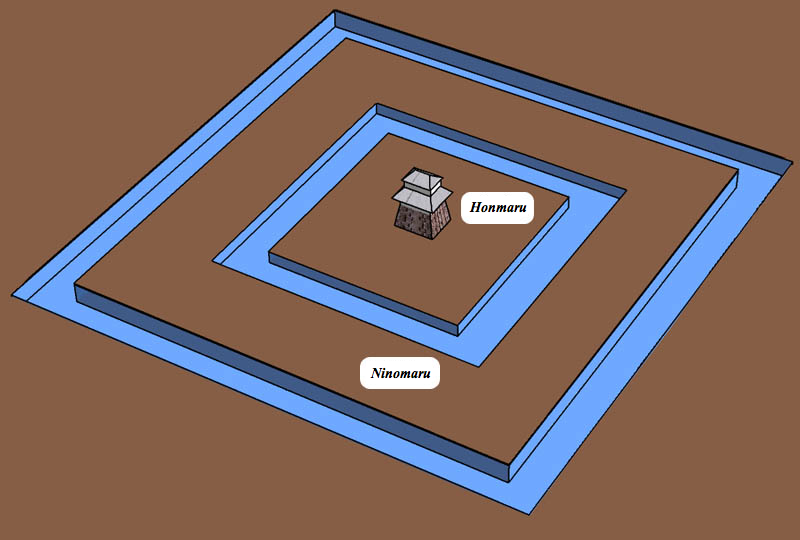
Rinkaku style

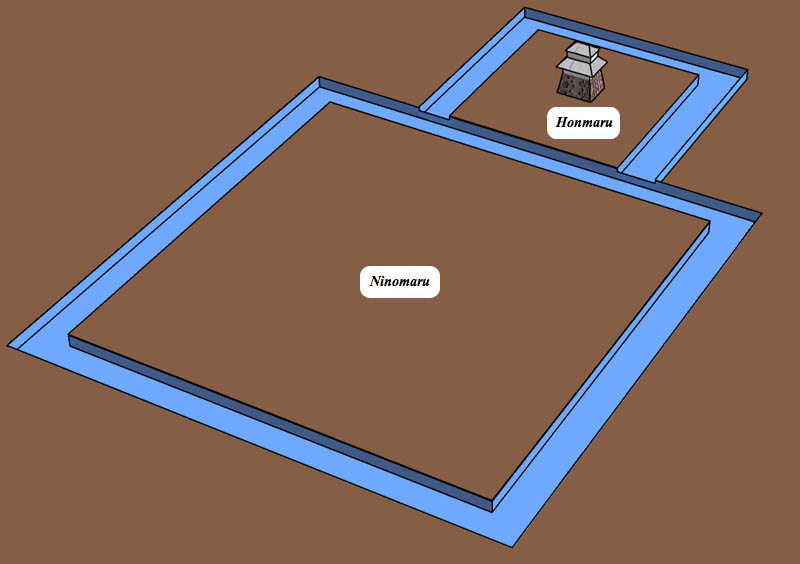
Renkaku style

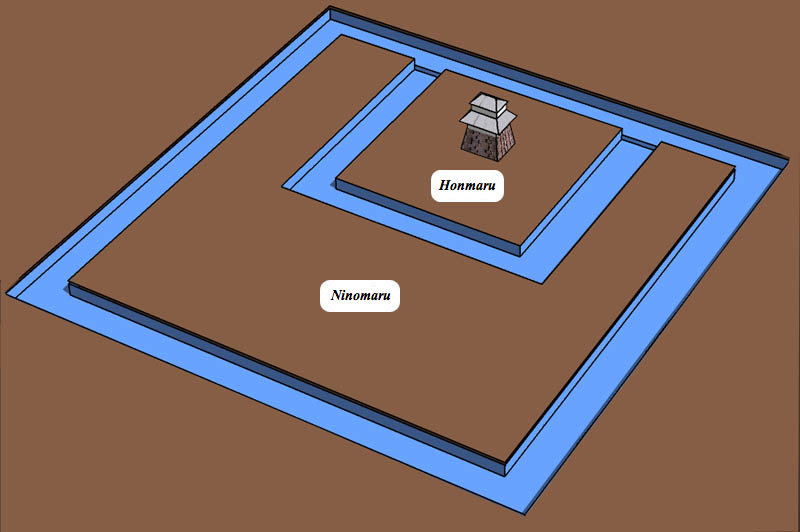
Teikaku style

== Related terms ==
Most of the terms take the form -kuruwa or -maru, but specific terms may differ depending on region or time period. Castles that use the naming -maru were built during the early modern period. Many castles contain kuruwa named after particular people or places.

Honmaru
The honmaru is the core region of the castle, and serves as the living quarters for the castle ruler, and is the final line of defense of the castle. It may also be referred to by many other names including ichi no kuruwa, ichi-no-maru or honkuruwa. The kuruwa can house an expensive central structure from which the castle ruler oversees the on-goings within the castle, or those affairs can be conducted from the outer walls so that the honmaru can be used as a compact, core structure that serves as the final line of defense during a siege.

Tenshumaru
The tenshumaru is a smaller kuruwa often located within the honmaru which houses the tenshu; the central fixture of all post-Sengoku period Japanese castles. Very few tenshu remain intact, and Kōchi Castle is the only castle that still contains its original tenshu. Tenshu entrances remain at Kawagoe Castle and Matsumae Castle.

Ninomaru and sannomaru
Also known as ninokuruwa or sannokuruwa, these regions serve as outside layers to the honmaru, and may vary in shape and size. Expansive ones can also house large living spaces similar to the structures within the honmaru itself.

Nishinomaru
Nishinomaru (lit. "western circle") is used as the castle ruler's retreat. The term was coined after Tokugawa Ieyasu, who lived in the eastern section of Edo Castle after retiring from his post as ruler. Nishinomaru are also present in Himeji Castle and Okayama Castle.

Obikuruwa & koshikuruwa
These terms refer to a narrow space created by walls to surround another kuruwa. They allowed defenders to better prevent the breach of an important castle sector, and were double-layered in the largest castles.

Sōkuruwa
This term refers to a kuruwa created by surrounding the castle town with a large moat, earthwork fortification, or stone wall. It is the largest and outermost kuruwa of any castle.

Demaru
The demaru is a separate kuruwa placed to strengthen a vulnerable spot or structure within the castle. The buke shohatto limited (essentially prohibited) the construction of castle walls, leading to the development of large "daimyo gardens" in place of the demaru.

Umadashi

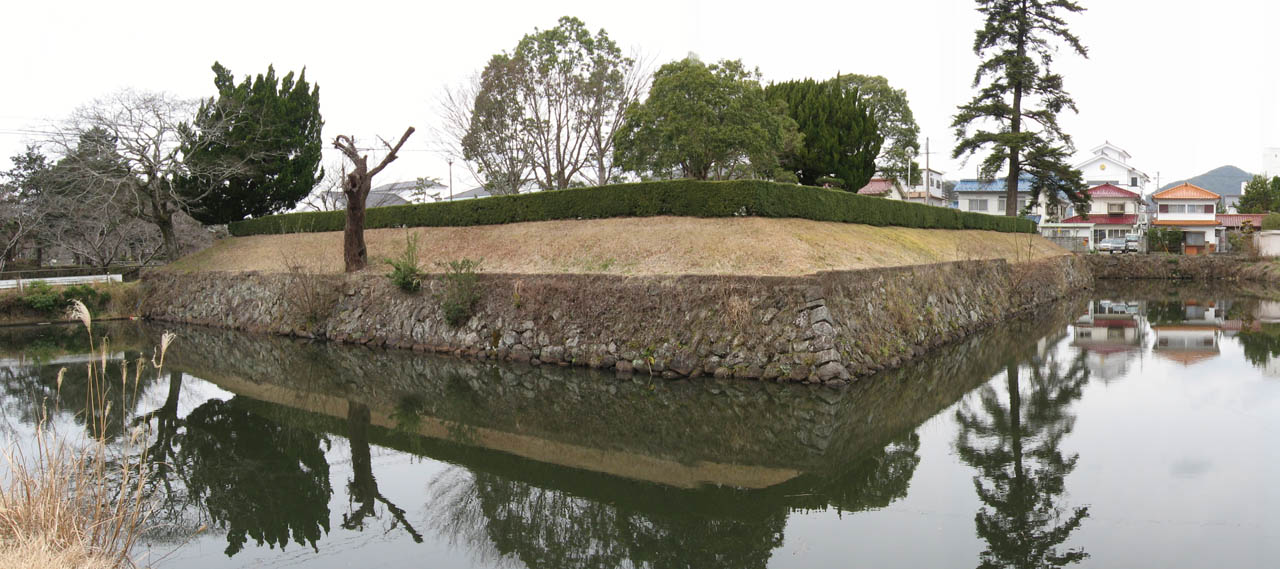
Remnant of an umadashi kuruwa outside of Sasayama Castle's east gate

The umadashi is a small kuruwa placed in front of the castle's entrance. In addition to simply making it difficult for the enemy to enter the castle grounds, it provides space for the defenders to repel the enemy with projectiles. It can also serve as a barracks for small parties of soldiers. This kuruwa can consist of any sort of wall from a shoddy earthwork fortification to large, strong walls as seen in Nagoya Castle, Sasayama Castle, and Hiroshima Castle.

Mizunote kuruwa
This refers to any kuruwa containing the castle's water supply.

== Bibliography ==
- Norio, Nanjō and Tatsuya Naramoto. Nihon no Meijō, Koten Jiten. TBS Britannica, 1989. ISBN 978-4-484-89208-5
- Rekishi Gunzō Henshūbu. Rekishi Gunzō Tokuetsuhen-shū Yomigaeru Nihon no Shiro 26 Shiroezu wo Yomu. Gakken, 2005. ISBN 978-4-05-604233-7
