= Yakami Domain =

Japanese domain of the Edo period

Yakami Domain (八上藩, Yakami-han) was a Japanese domain of the Edo period, located in Tanba Province (modern-day Sasayama, Hyōgo). It was ruled by Maeda Shigekatsu (a son of Maeda Gen'i) and then by Matsudaira Yasushige, the head of the Matsui-Matsudaira clan. The domain was abolished in 1609. It was replaced by the Sasayama Domain in the same year of 1609.

== See also ==
- Tamba Sasayama
