= Tadanaga =

- Gender: Male

Origin
- Origin: Japanese
- Meaning: Different meanings depending on the kanji used

Tadanaga (written: 忠長 or 忠良) is a masculine Japanese given name. Notable people with the name include:

- Aoyama Tadanaga (青山 忠良) (1806–1864), Japanese daimyō
- Tokugawa Tadanaga (徳川 忠長) (1606–1633), Japanese daimyō
