= Aoyama Tadanaga =

Japanese daimyō

Daimyō of Sasayama
- In office 1835–1862
- Preceded by: Aoyama Tadayasu
- Succeeded by: Aoyama Tadatoshi

Personal details
- Born: May 27, 1806
- Died: December 13, 1864 (aged 58)

Aoyama Tadanaga (青山 忠良; May 27, 1806 – December 13, 1864) was a Japanese daimyō of the late Edo period, who ruled the Sasayama Domain. He served as a rōjū in the Tokugawa shogunate.

== Gallery ==
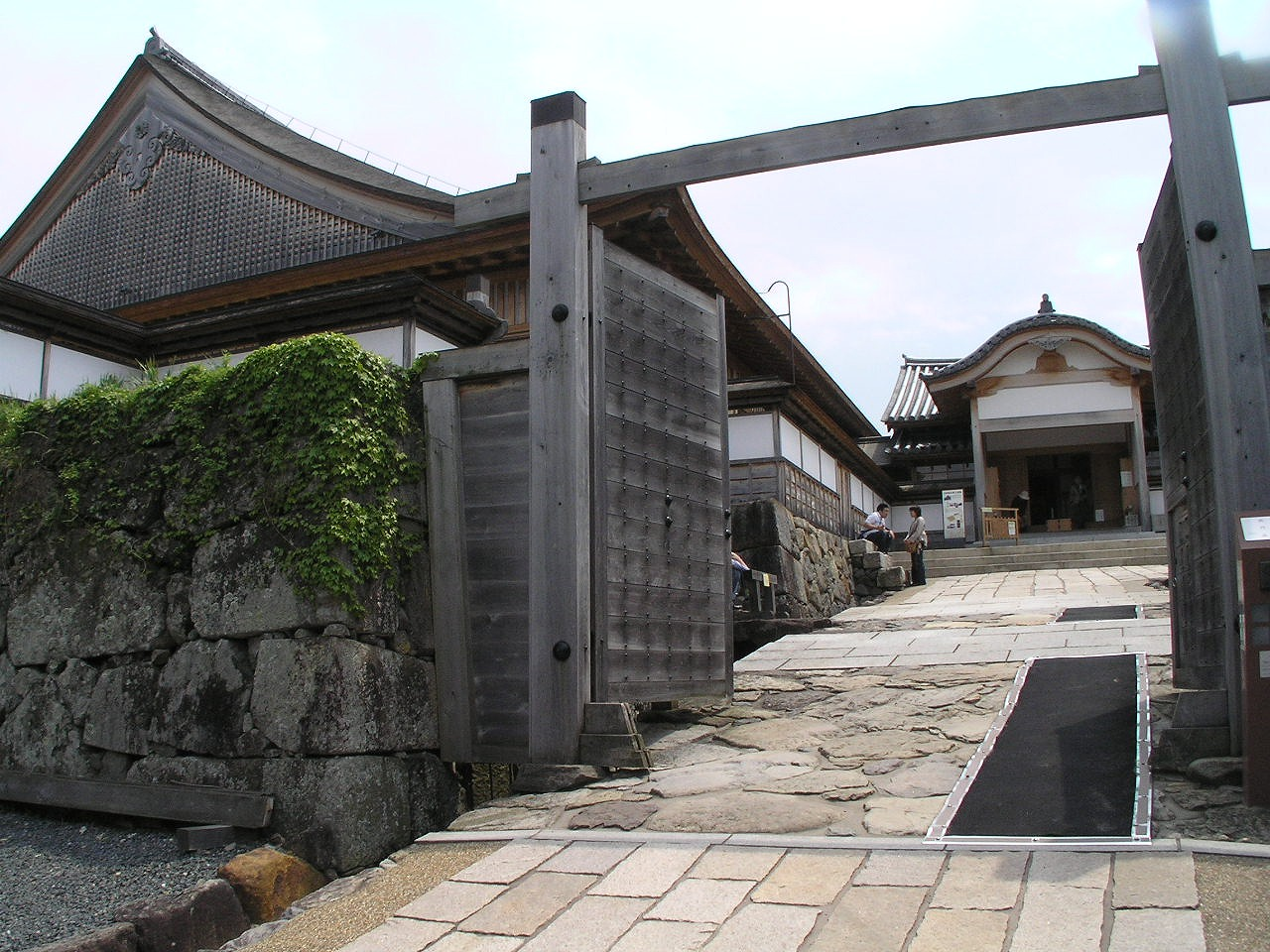
Sasayama Castle

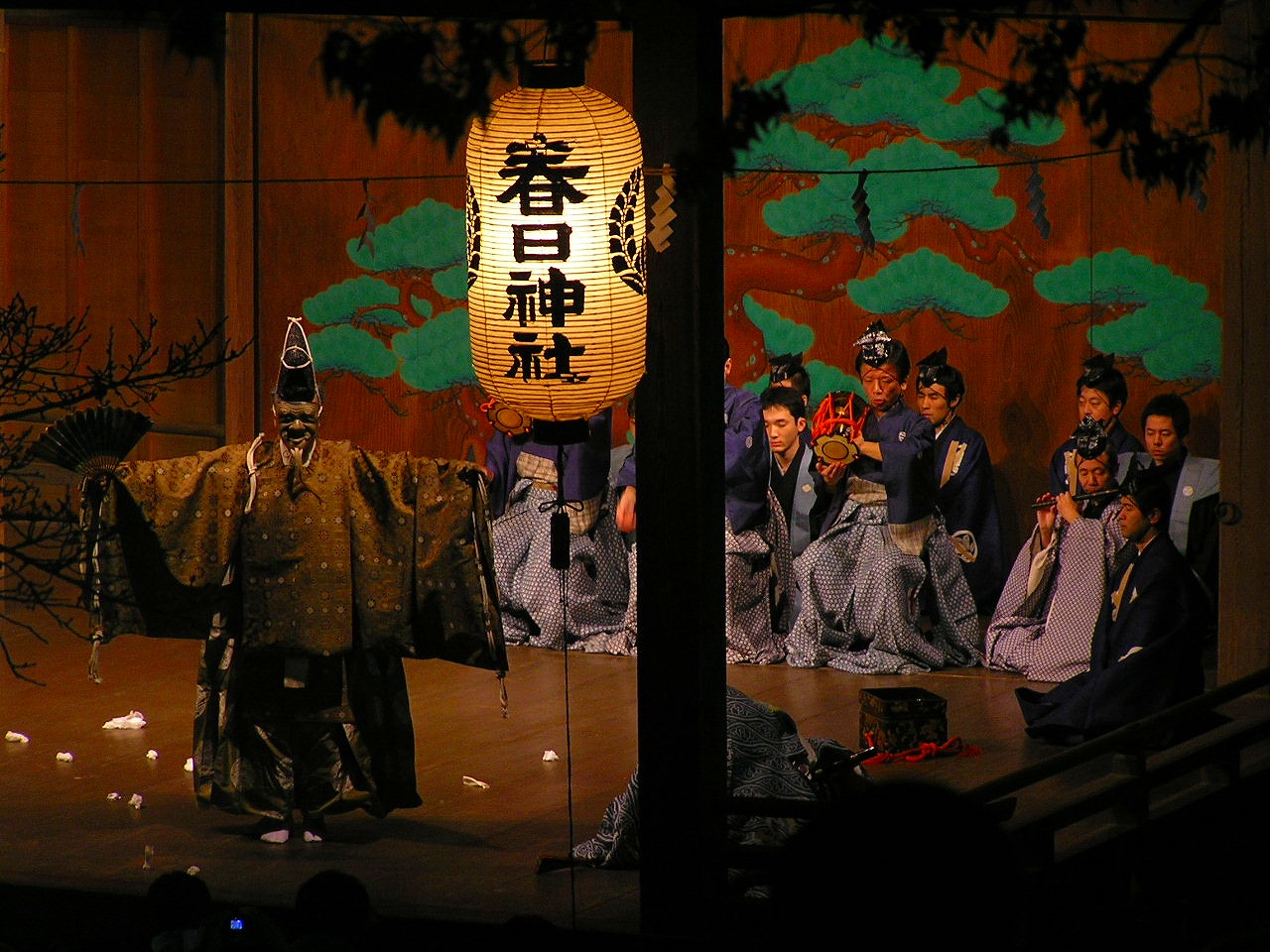
Kasuga Jinja
