= Sasayama Domain =

Japanese feudal domain located in Tanba Province

Sasayama Domain 篠山藩
- under Tokugawa shogunate Japan
- 1600–1871
- Capital: Sasayama Castle
- Area
  - Coordinates: 35°17′48.5″N 135°7′46.8″E
  - Type: Daimyō
- Historical era: Edo period
  - Established: 1600
  - Matsui-Matsudaira clan: 1608
  - Fujii-Matsudaira clan: 1619
  - Katahara-Matsudaira clan: 1649
  - Aoyama clan: 1748
  - Disestablished: 1871
- Today part of: part of Hyōgo Prefecture

Location of Sasayama Castle
Sasayama Domain (Japan)

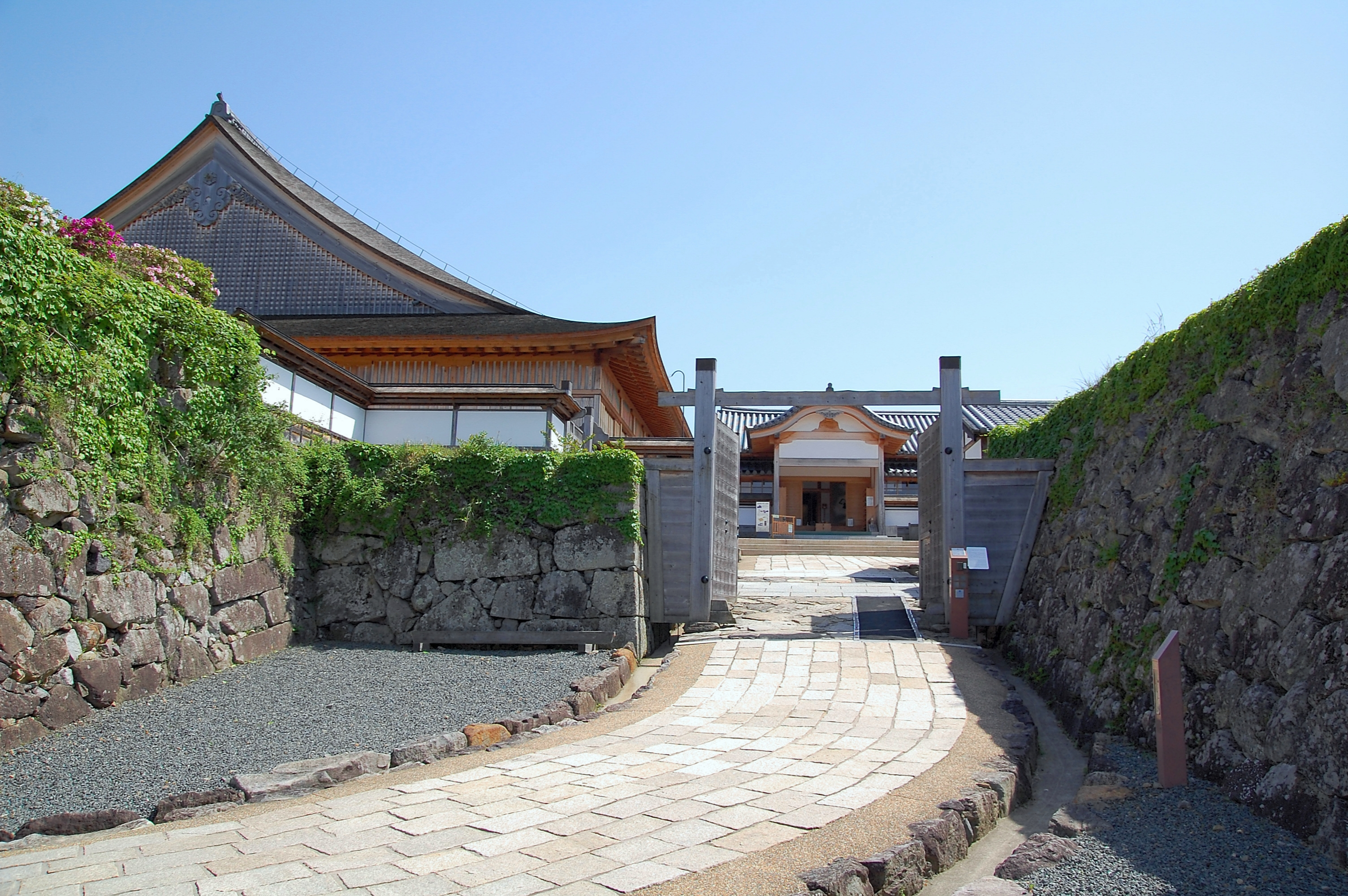
Reconstructed entrance to Sasayama Castle

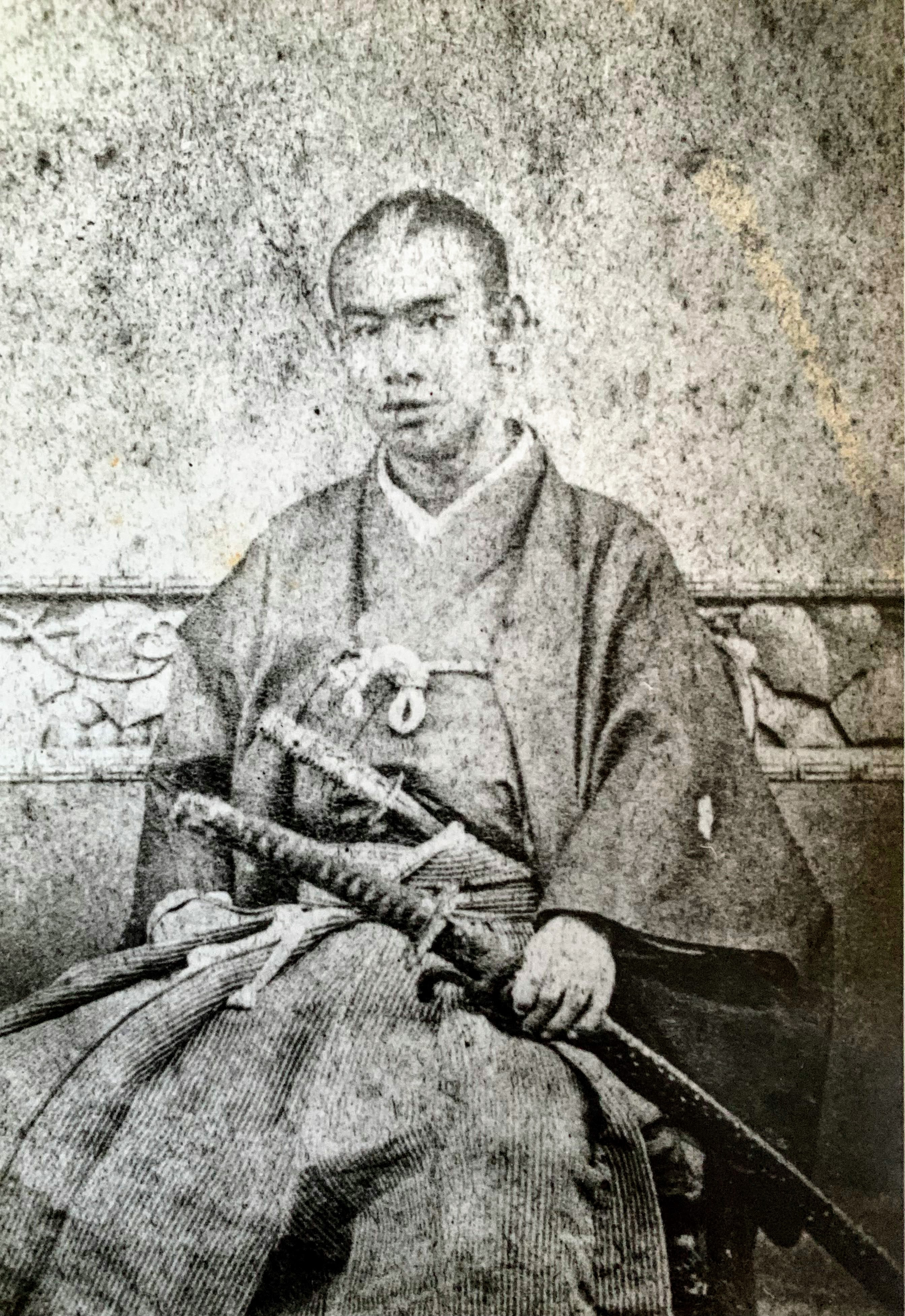
Aoyama Tadayuki, final daimyō of Sasayama

Sasayama Domain (篠山藩, Sasayama-han) was a feudal domain under the Tokugawa shogunate of Edo period Japan, located in Tanba Province in what is now the west-central portion of modern-day Hyōgo Prefecture. It was centered initially on Sasayama Castle in what is now the city of Tamba-Sasayama.

== History ==
The Sasayama area is a strategic junction of highways from Kyoto to both the San'in region, and the San'yo regions of western Japan. Recognizing the importance of this location, after the Battle of Sekigahara, Tokugawa Ieyasu ordered the construction of Sasayama Castle to isolate Toyotomi Hideyori at Osaka Castle from the powerful feudal lords of western Japan, many of whom still had pro-Toyotomi loyalties. In 1608, he appointed Matsudaira Yasushige, who was possibly his illegitimate son, to oversee construction, and as daimyō of the new 50,000 koku Sasayama Domain. The design of the castle was done by Tōdō Takatora, construction overseen by Ikeda Terumasa and the materials and labor provided by the Fukushima, Kato clan, Hachisuka clan and Asano clan. Matsudaira Yasushige was transferred to Kishiwada Domain in 1619. He was replaced by Matsudaira Yoshimichi from another cadet branch of the Matsudaira clan, the Fujii-Matsudaira. He was the son of Tokugawa Ieyasu's half-sister. His son Matsudaira Tadakuni was overseer of the attainder of Murakami Domain and Fukuchiyama Domains, and also conducted land surveys, expanded the castle town and built numerous shrines and temples before he was transferred to Akashi Domain in 1649.

Matsudaira Yasunobu, from the Katahara-Matsudaira became daimyō, and his cadet branch of the Matsudaira clan ruled until their transfer to Tanba-Kameyama Domain in 1748. The 4th daimyō, Matsudaira Nobutsuna served as Kyoto Shoshidai and rōjū and invited cultural figures to the domain. However, his son, Matsudaira Nobumine, was a poor ruler and was injured during peasant uprisings in the Kyōhō famine. The shogunate ordered him to trade places with Aoyama Tadatomo of Tanba-Kameyama Domain in 1748.

The Aoyama would rule the domain until the Meiji restoration. Aoyama Tadatomo served as Jisha-bugyō and Osaka-jō dai in the shogunal administration. His successor, Aoyama Tadataka invited Confucian scholars to the domain, and built a han school, the "Shintokudo", which was later expanded by the 4th daimyō, Aoyama Tadahiro. He also served as Jisha-bugyō, Kyoto Shoshidai and Osaka-jō dai in the shogunal administration. His son, Aoyama Tadanaga was a Jisha-bugyō and rōjū. On the other hand, due to poor harvests, peasant rebellions frequently occurred. The domain had little economic production other than rice cultivation, and as a result, the clan's finances and territories were often in dire straits. The domain made laws to prevent peasants from fleeing their lands; however, Aoyama Tadahiro was forced to relax these regulations to allow peasants to work in Settsu Province in the winter months as migrant workers in the sake industry. He also invited potters from Kyoto to the domain in an attempt to start a ceramics industry. Nevertheless, due to new taxes frequently imposed for financial reconstruction, over 20 peasant uprisings occurred. By the end of the domain, its debt was estimated at 281,329 ryō.

During the Bakumatsu period, as with almost all domains, the samurai of Sasayama were divided between pro-Tokugawa and pro-sonnō-jōi factions, although the domain itself was regarded as one of the most loyal of the fudai houses the final daimyō, Aoyama Takayuki, served as guard of Nijō Castle in Kyoto and led shogunate forces in the Kinmon Incident. However, after the start of the Boshin War, when Saionji Kinmochi led an imperial army to Sasayama, the domain surrendered without a fight. Aoyama Tadayuki became imperial governor in 1869. In 1871, with the abolition of the han system, Sasayama briefly became "Sasayama Prefecture", which was merged with "Toyooka Prefecture" a few months later, before becoming part of Hyogo Prefecture on August 21, 1876.

== Holdings at the end of the Edo period ==
As with most domains in the han system, Sasayama Domain consisted of several discontinuous territories calculated to provide the assigned kokudaka, based on periodic cadastral surveys and projected agricultural yields.

- Tanba Province
  - 104 villages in Taki District (entire district)
  - 56 villages in Kuwada District
  - 12 villages in Funai District
  - 4 villages in Ikaruga District
  - 2 villages in Amata District
- Tajima Province
  - 16 villages in Asago District
- Settsu Province
  - 3 villages in Muko District
- Tōtōmi Province
  - 10 villages in Haibara District
  - 14 villages in Kitō District

== List of daimyō ==
#	Name	Tenure	Courtesy title	Court rank	Kokudaka
Matsui-Matsudaira clan, 1608–1619 (fudai)
1	Matsudaira Yasushige (松平康重)	1608–1619	Suo-no-kami (周防守)	Junior 4th Rank, Lower Grade (従四位下)	50,000 koku
Fujii-Matsudaira clan, 1619–1649 (fudai)
1	Matsudaira Nobuyoshi (松平信吉)	1619–1620	Izu-no-kami (伊豆守)	Junior 5th Rank, Lower Grade (従五位下)	50,000 koku
2	Matsudaira Tadakuni (松平忠国)	1620–1649	Yamashiro-no-kami (山城守)	Junior 5th Rank, Lower Grade (従五位下)	50,000 koku
Katahara-Matsudaira clan, 1649–1748 (fudai))
1	Matsudaira Yasunobu (松平康信)	1649–1669	Wakasa-no-kami (若狭守)	Junior 4th Rank, Lower Grade (従四位下)	50,000 koku
2	Matsudaira Sukenobu (松平典信)	1669–1672	Suruga-no-kami (駿河守)	Junior 5th Rank, Lower Grade (従五位下)	50,000 koku
3	Matsudaira Nobutoshi (松平信利)	1672–1676	Shuzen-no-kami (主膳正)	Junior 5th Rank, Lower Grade (従五位下)	50,000 koku
4	Matsudaira Nobutsune (松平信庸)	1677–1717	Kii-no-kami (紀伊守); Jijū (侍従)	Junior 4th Rank, Lower Grade (従四位下)	50,000 koku
5	Matsudaira Nobumine (松平信岑)	1717–1748	Kii-no-kami (紀伊守)	Junior 4th Rank, Lower Grade (従四位下)	50,000 koku
Aoyama clan, 1748–1871 (fudai))
1	Aoyama Tadatomo (青山忠朝)	1748–1760	Inaba-no-kami (因幡守 )	Junior 4th Rank, Lower Grade (従四位下)	50,000 koku
2	Aoyama Tadataka (青山忠高)	1760–1781	Shimotsuke-no-kami (下野守 )	Junior 5th Rank, Lower Grade (従五位下)	50,000 koku
3	Aoyama Tadatsugu (青山忠講)	1781–1785	Hoki-no-kami (伯耆守 )	Junior 5th Rank, Lower Grade (従五位下)	50,000 koku
4	Aoyama Tadayasu (青山忠裕)	1785–1835	Shimotsuke-no-kami (下野守)	Junior 4th Rank, Lower Grade (従四位下)	50,000 -> 60,000 koku
5	Aoyama Tadanaga (青山忠良)	1835–1862	Shimotsuke-no-kami (下野守)	Junior 4th Rank, Lower Grade (従四位下)	60,000 koku
6	Aoyama Tadayuki (青山忠敏)	1862–1871	Inaba-no-kami (因幡守), Sakyo-no-daibu (左京大夫)	Junior 4th Rank, Lower Grade (従四位下)	60,000 koku

== See also ==
- List of Han
- Abolition of the han system
