= ISFnet =

Japanese IT services company

ISFnet Inc. (株式会社アイエスエフネット) is a multinational integrated IT services company based in Tokyo, Japan. The company was founded in January 2000 by Japanese entrepreneur, Yukiyoshi Watanabe (渡邉 幸義). It currently operates in 16 locations across Japan and has subsidiaries in China, Korea and Singapore.

== ISFnet Harmony Ltd. ==
ISFnet Harmony Ltd. is a wholly owned subsidiary of ISFnet Inc, designated as a special subsidiary under the Japanese Disability Employment Encouragement Law. Set up in 2008, ISFnet Harmony Ltd. offers employment opportunities in the IT sector to people with disabilities.

== ISFnet Care Ltd. ==
ISFnet Care Ltd. was established to offer diverse employment opportunities to groups of people who often find themselves excluded from the mainstream labor force, such as primary caregivers, people with disabilities or mental health problems.

== Hospitality In IT ==
ISFnet Inc. has pioneered hospitality in the IT services sector (the adoption of 5-star hotel service standards), and was the focus of a book, IT Business Strategy and Corporate Hospitality by Japanese business guru Masamitsu Hayashida.,

== Domestic Offices ==
Sapporo, Sendai, Utsunomiya, Numazu, Shizuoka, Nagoya, Osaka, Hiroshima, Fukuoka, Tokyo, Morioka.
