= Aoyama Yukiyoshi =

Japanese politician

Senior Second Rank Viscount Aoyama Yukiyoshi
- 青山 幸宜
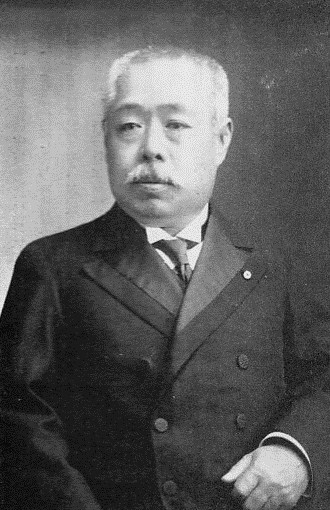
- Aoyama Yukiyoshi, October 1913

Member of the House of Peers
- In office 10 July 1890 – 9 July 1925 Elected by the Viscounts

Governor of Gujō Domain
- In office 1869–1871
- Monarch: Meiji
- Preceded by: Himself (as Daimyō of Gujō)
- Succeeded by: Position abolished

Daimyō of Gujō Domain
- In office 1863–1869
- Shōgun: Tokugawa Iemochi; Tokugawa Yoshinobu
- Preceded by: Aoyama Yukishige
- Succeeded by: Himself (as Governor of Gujō)

Personal details
- Born: 8 January 1855 Hachiman, Mino, Japan
- Died: 6 February 1930 (aged 75) Tokyo, Japan
- Parent: Aoyama Yukishige (father)

Viscount Aoyama Yukiyoshi (青山 幸宜; 8 January 1855 – 6 February 1930) was the 7th and final daimyō of Gujō Domain under the Bakumatsu period Tokugawa Shogunate of Japan. He was the 11th hereditary chieftain of the Gujō-Aoyama clan. During the Meiji period, he was a politician and member of the House of Peers of the Diet of Japan.

== Biography ==
Aoyama Yukiyoshi was the eldest son of the 6th daimyō of Gujō Domain, Aoyama Yukishige. He became daimyō in 1863 on the death of his father. The following year, the shogunate ordered the domain to reply troops against the Mito Rebellion, but by the time the order reached the domain, the rebel forces had already passed. In the Bakumatsu period, as with most domains, the samurai were divided between a pro-shogunate faction and a pro-sonnō jōi faction whose goal was to restore political power to the throne. Aoyama Yukiyoshi refused to support either side, and many of the pro-Tokugawa samurai rallied around the son of his chief retainer and formed a type of freikorps which joined the defenders at the Battle of Aizu in the Boshin War. The new Meiji government awarded Aoyama for his inactivity, and appointed him imperial governor of Gujō-Hachiman in 1868. With the abolition of the han system in 1871 he relocated to Tokyo. With the establishment of kazoku peerage on 8 July 1884, he was made a viscount (shishaku). He later served as president of Nippon Printing Company, and as a director on the Iwakura Railway School. He was appointed to the House of Peers in 1890.

Aoyama was married three times. His first wife, Setsuko, was the daughter of the kuge, Tadaaya Hirohata. His second wife, Machiko, was the daughter of the famed Ii Naosuke. His third wife, Fumiko, was the daughter of Todo Tadakuni of Hisai Domain. Aoyama Yukiyoshi died on 6 February 1930. He is 75 years old. His grave is at the temple of Baiso-in in Minami-Aoyama, Tokyo.
