= Gujō Hachiman Castle =

Castle ruin in Gujō, Gifu, Japan

- 郡上八幡城
- Gujō, Gifu Prefecture, Japan
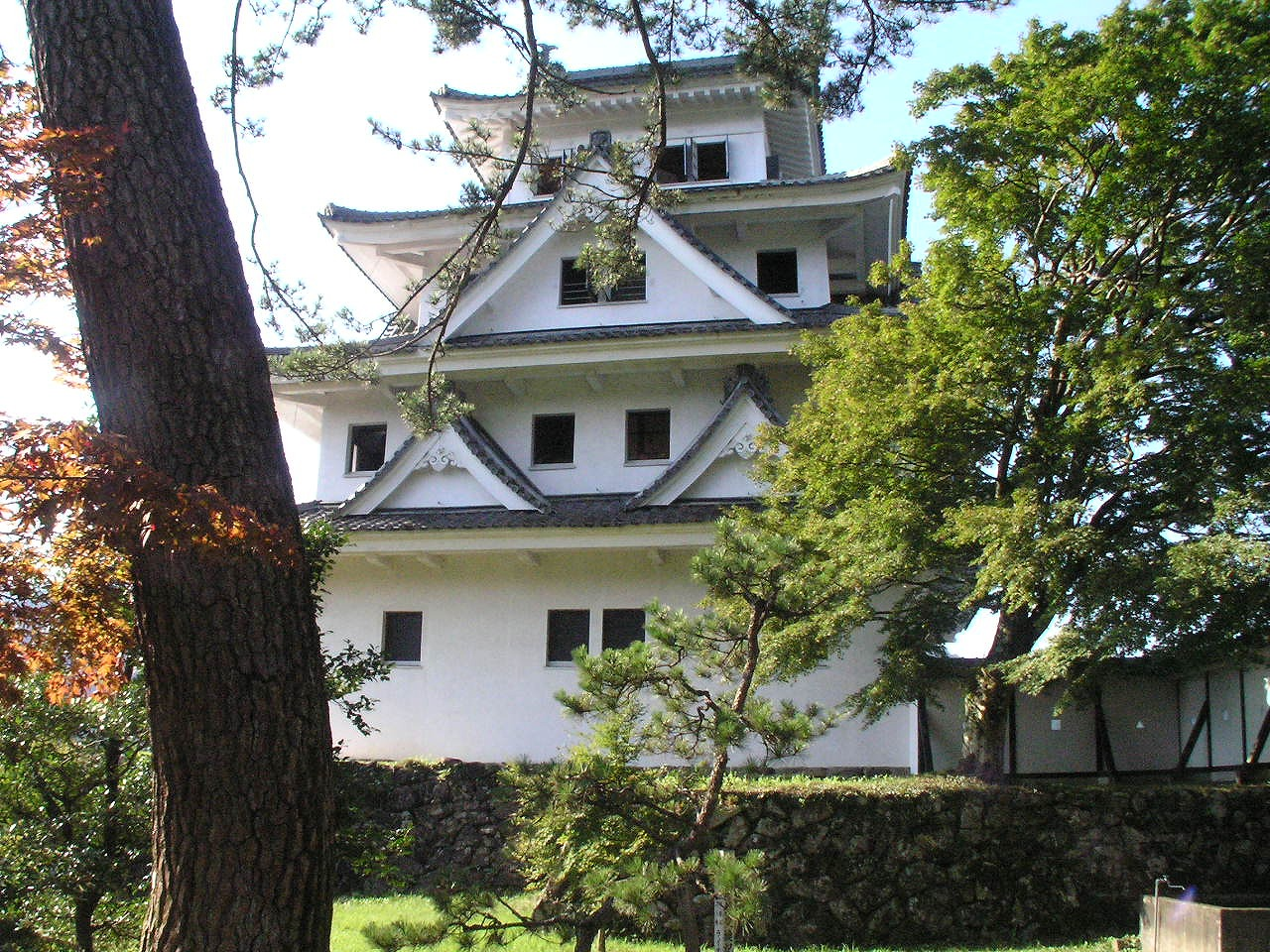
- Gujō Hachiman Castle's keep

Site information
- Type: Mountaintop castle
- Condition: Reconstruction

Location
- Location within Gifu Prefecture Location within Japan
- Coordinates: 35°45′12″N 136°57′41″E

Site history
- Built: 1559
- Built by: Endō Morikazu
- Demolished: 1871

Garrison information
- Occupants: Endō clan, Aoyama clan

Gujō Hachiman Castle (郡上八幡城, Gujō Hachiman-jō) is a yamashiro, or "mountain castle", located on Hachiman Mountain in the city of Gujō, Gifu Prefecture, Japan. Its ruins were designated a Gifu Prefecture Historic Site in 1955.

== Background ==
Gujo Hachiman Castle is located at the top of the 350 meter Mount Hachiman, close to the confluence of the Yoshida and Kodaraga Rivers and the main stream of the Nagara River. These two rivers and the mountain form a natural defense for the castle, which also commands a north–south road connecting central Mino Province with Nagoya and Gifu to the south and the Sea of Japan to the north, and an east–west road leading to Hida Province in the east and Echizen Province in the west.

== History ==
In the Kamakura period, this area was controlled by a cadet branch of the Chiba clan, who were rewarded by the Kamakura shogunate for their role in the Jōkyū War. This cadet branch was named the Tō clan (東氏) and due to their skill at waka poetry, became close retainers of the Ashikaga shogunate in the Muromachi period. They constructed a castle called "Shinowaki Castle". The 8th Shogun Ashikaga Yoshimasa ordered Tō Tsuneyori to lead an expedition to the Kantō region to restore the authority of the shogunate. In his absence, his castle was seized by the deputy shugo of Mino, Saitō Myōchin. However, Tō Tsuneyori's skill at poetry was such that he was able to persuade Saitō to restore the castle to him with a poem. However, conditions became increasing difficult in the Sengoku period, and the Tō were barely able to repulse an invasion by the Asakura clan from the north. To strengthen their defenses, the Tō constructed Tōdonomayama Castle on the Yoshida River. In 1559, Endō Morikazu, from a cadet branch of the Tō, overthrew the Tō clan, destroying Tōdonomayama Castle and building a new one on Mount Hachiman on the opposite side of the river. Morikazu had barely finished the castle when he died, leaving it to his son Endō Yoshitaka. Yoshitaka later became a retainer to Oda Nobunaga. After the assassination of Nobunaga in 1582, Yoshitaka pledged fealty to Nobunaga's third son, Oda Nobutaka and fought against Toyotomi Hideyoshi. However, after the Toyotomi forces defeated Shibata Katsuie and Oda Nobutaka, Endo Yoshitaka surrendered, and Hideyoshi awarded the castle to his retainer, Inaba Sadamichi. Under Inaba, the castle was completely renovated and modernized with stone walls.

Following the death of Hideyoshi in 1598, Inaba initially supported Ishida Mitsunari . He came under attack from Endō Yoshitaka who was hoping recover his former territories and was forced to surrender Gujō Hachiman Castle to the Endō. However, by this time, Inaba Sadamichi had already switched his fealty to Tokugawa Ieyasu, and with Tokugawa help, was able to recover the castle from Endō Yoshitaka. Both rivals fought on the same side during the Battle of Sekigahara in 1600 and Tokugawa Ieyasu resolved the dispute by awarding Inaba Sadamichi with Usuki Domain in Kyushu and returning Gujō Hachiman Castle to Endō Yoshitaka.

The Endō clan ruled for a century, but declined due to internal conflicts and was transferred to a smaller territory in the Kantō region in 1693. The castle then came under the control of various fudai daimyō clans: The Inoue clan (1693-1697), the Kanamori clan (1697-1758) and finally the Aoyama clan, who ruled from 1758 to the Meiji restoration.

In accordance with directives issued by the Meiji government, all remaining structures of the castle were demolished in 1870, leaving only the inner moats and some stone walls. In 1933, a faux wooden reconstruction of a tenshu was constructed on the ruins of the inner bailey. Although this building is not historically accurate (it was based on the design of the tenshu of Ōgaki Castle, it contributes to the image of Gujō Hachiman being a castle town and helps attract tourists. In 1987, this reconstructed building was designated as a Tangible Cultural Property of Gujō city. The building contain a museum.

The castle was listed as one of the Continued Top 100 Japanese Castles in 2017.

== Gallery ==
Gujo Hachiman Castle

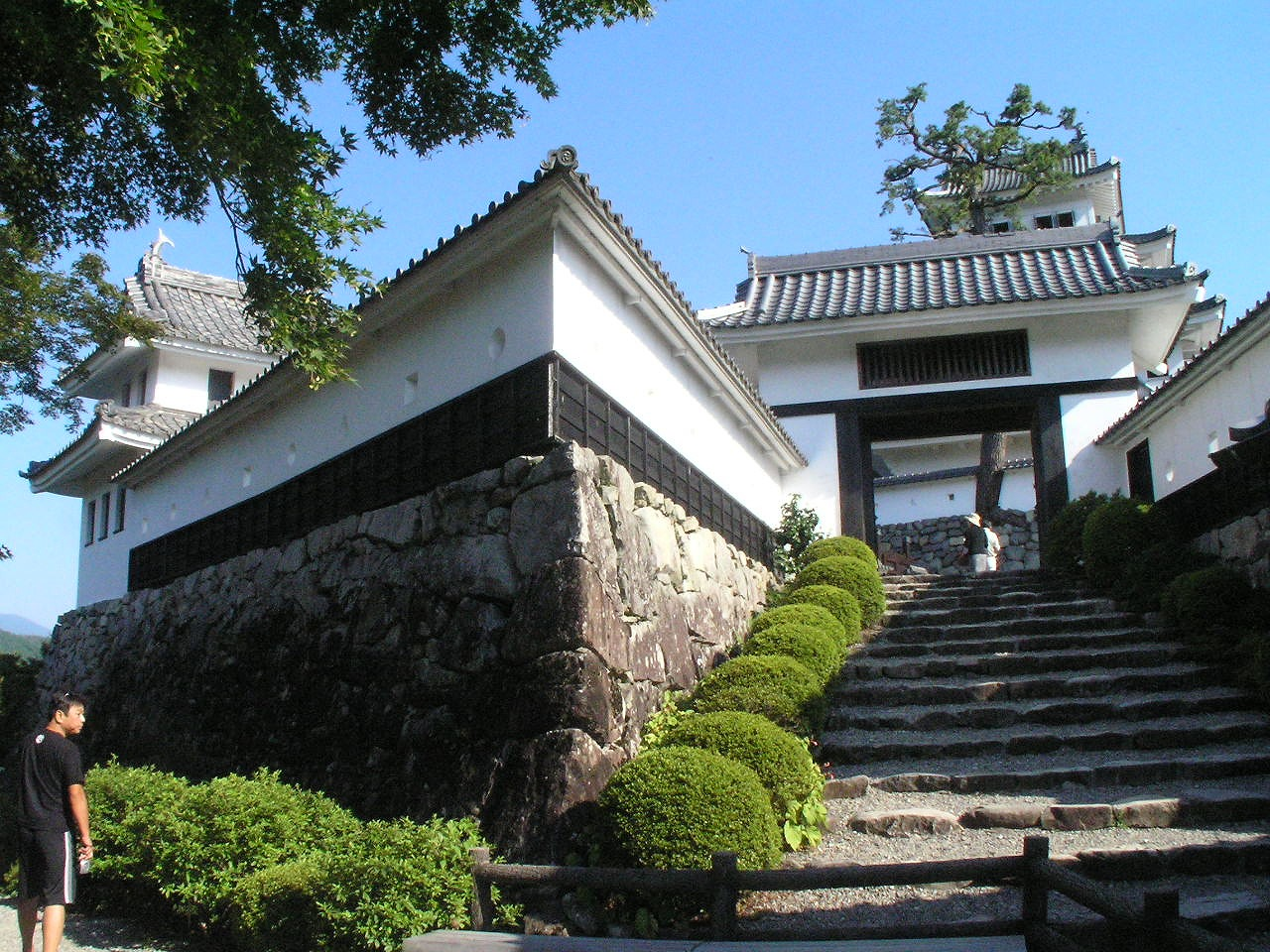
Gujo Hachiman Castle Main Gate

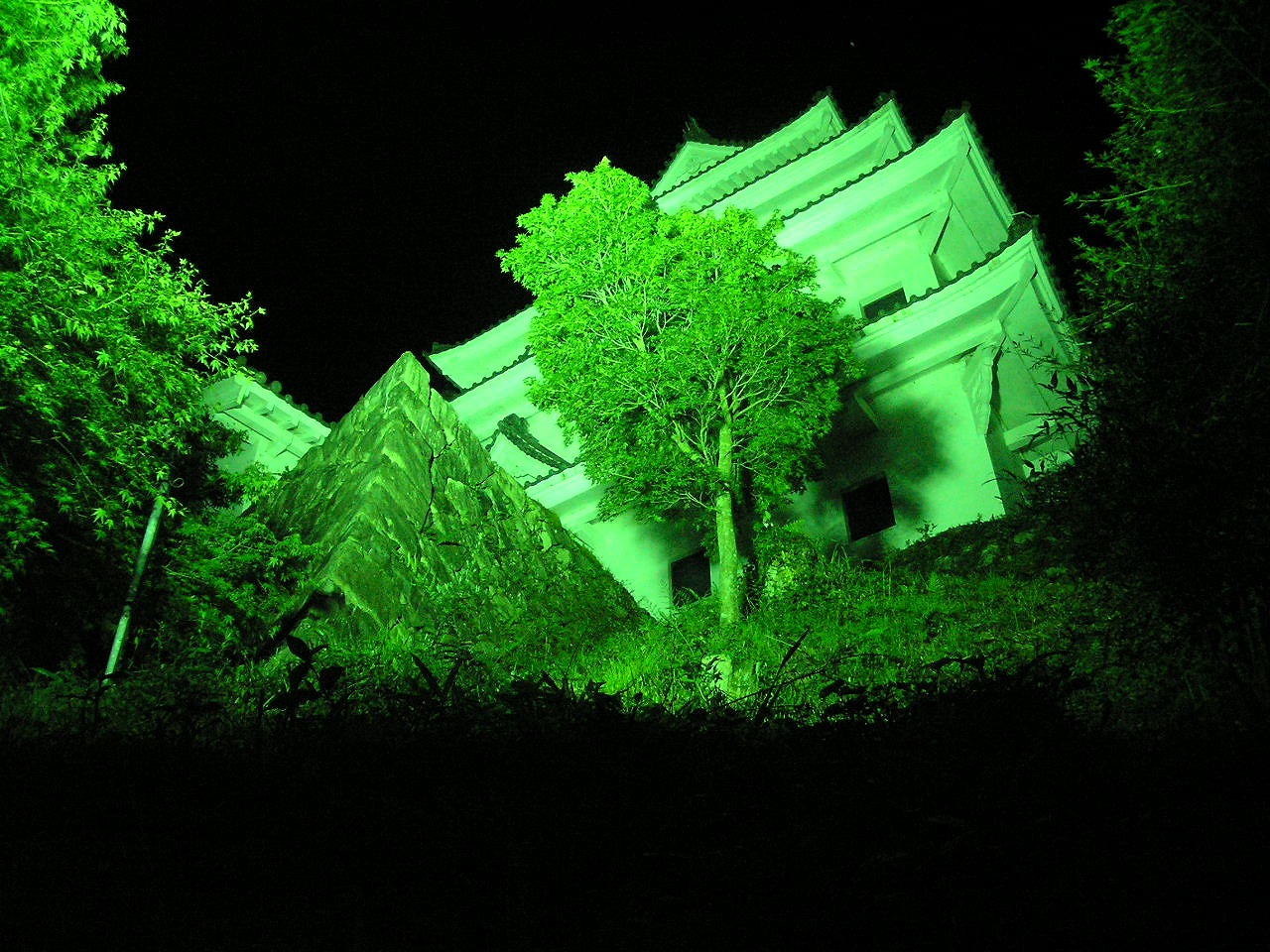
Illuminated Gujo Hachiman castle

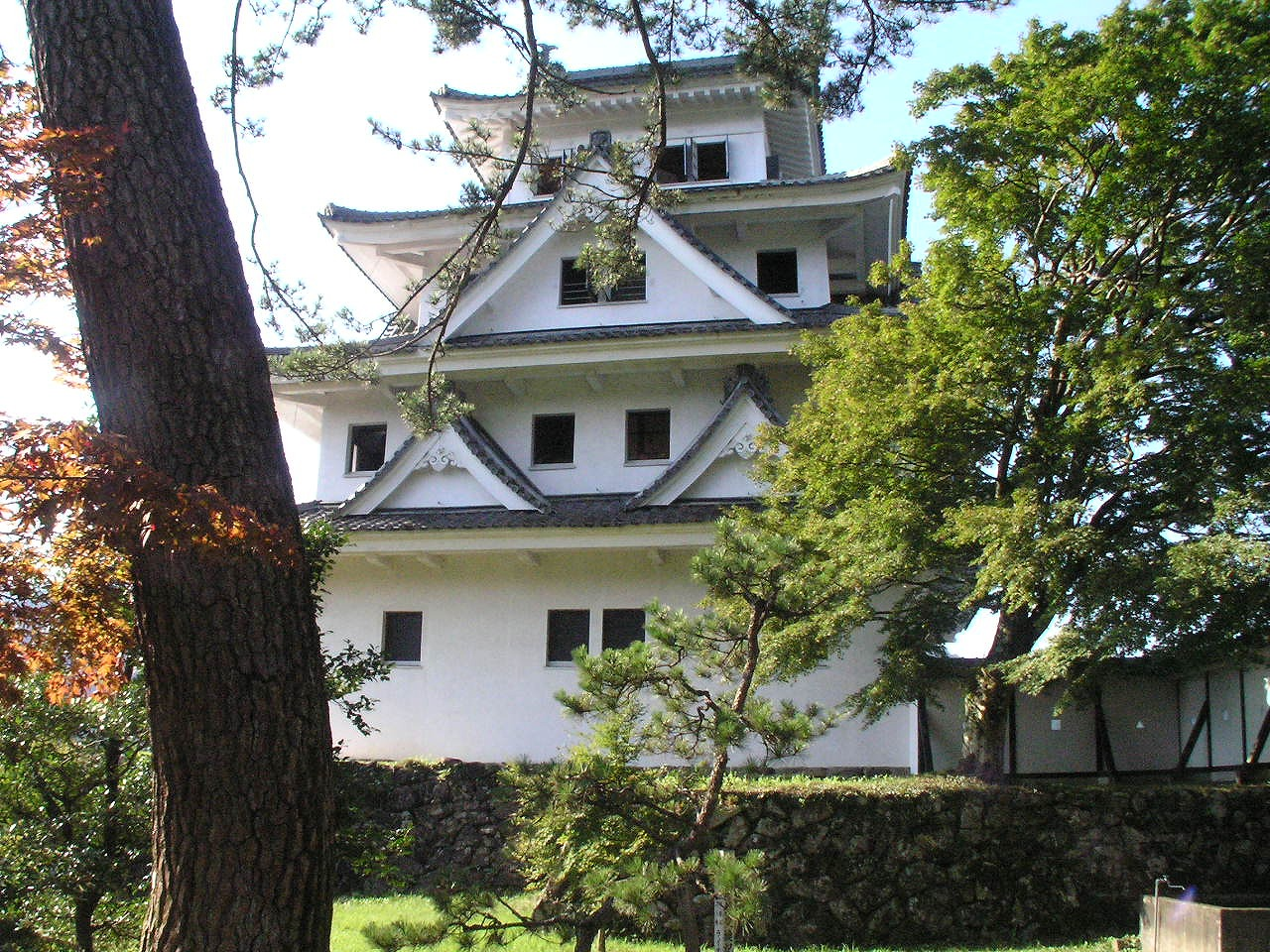
Gujo Hachiman Castle seen from the back

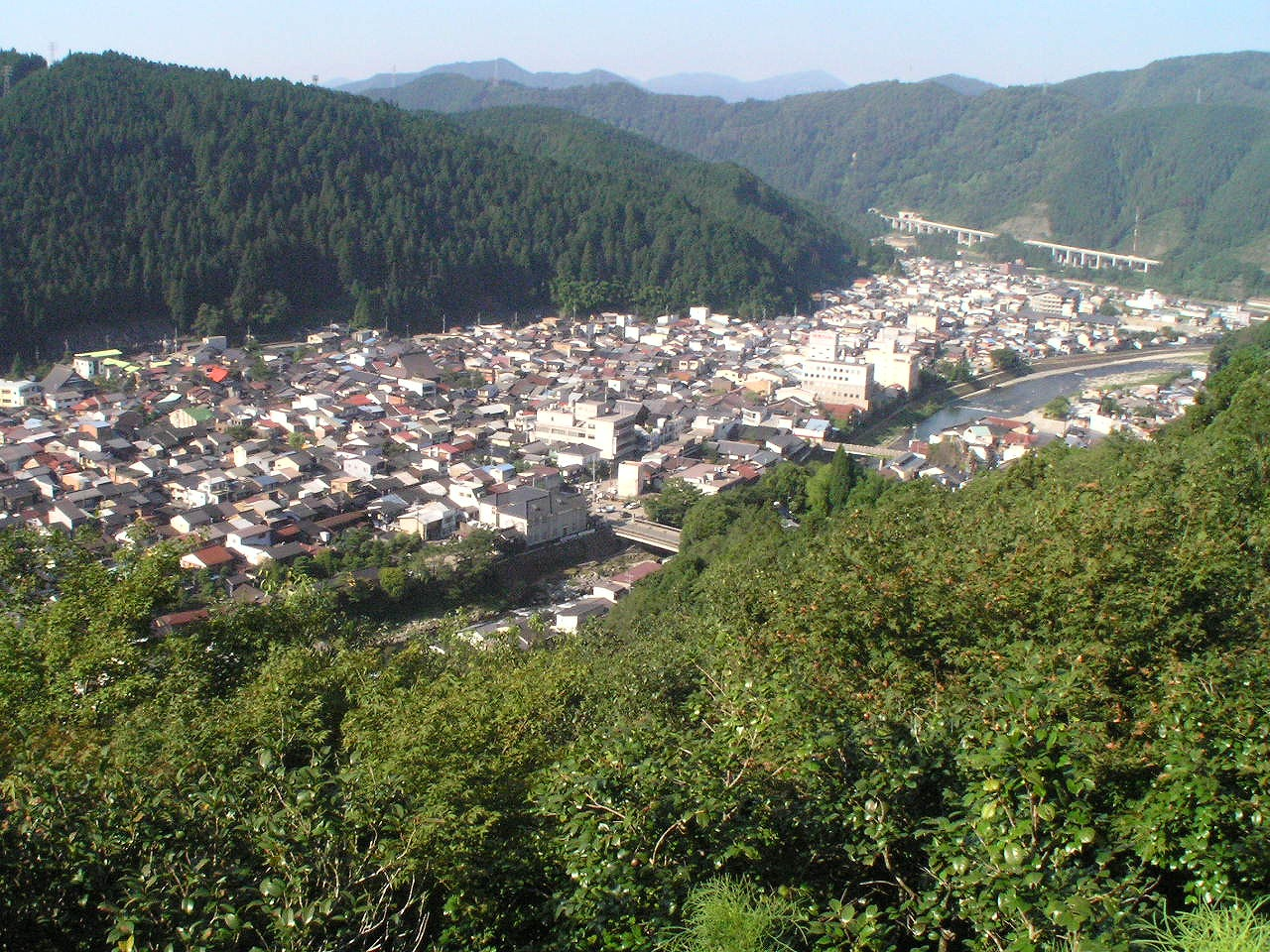
Gujō city from the castle

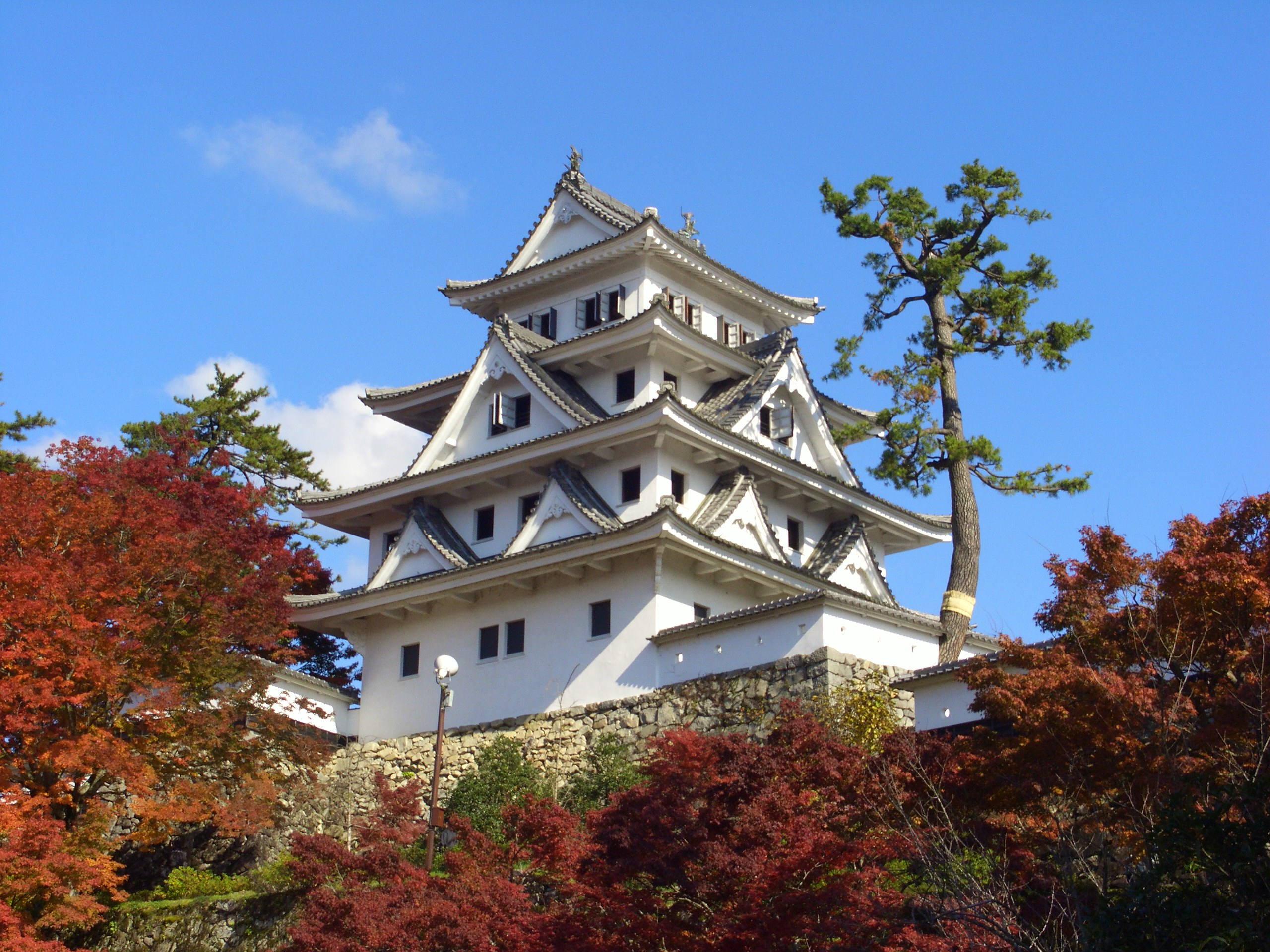
Autumn leaves and Gujo Hachiman Castle

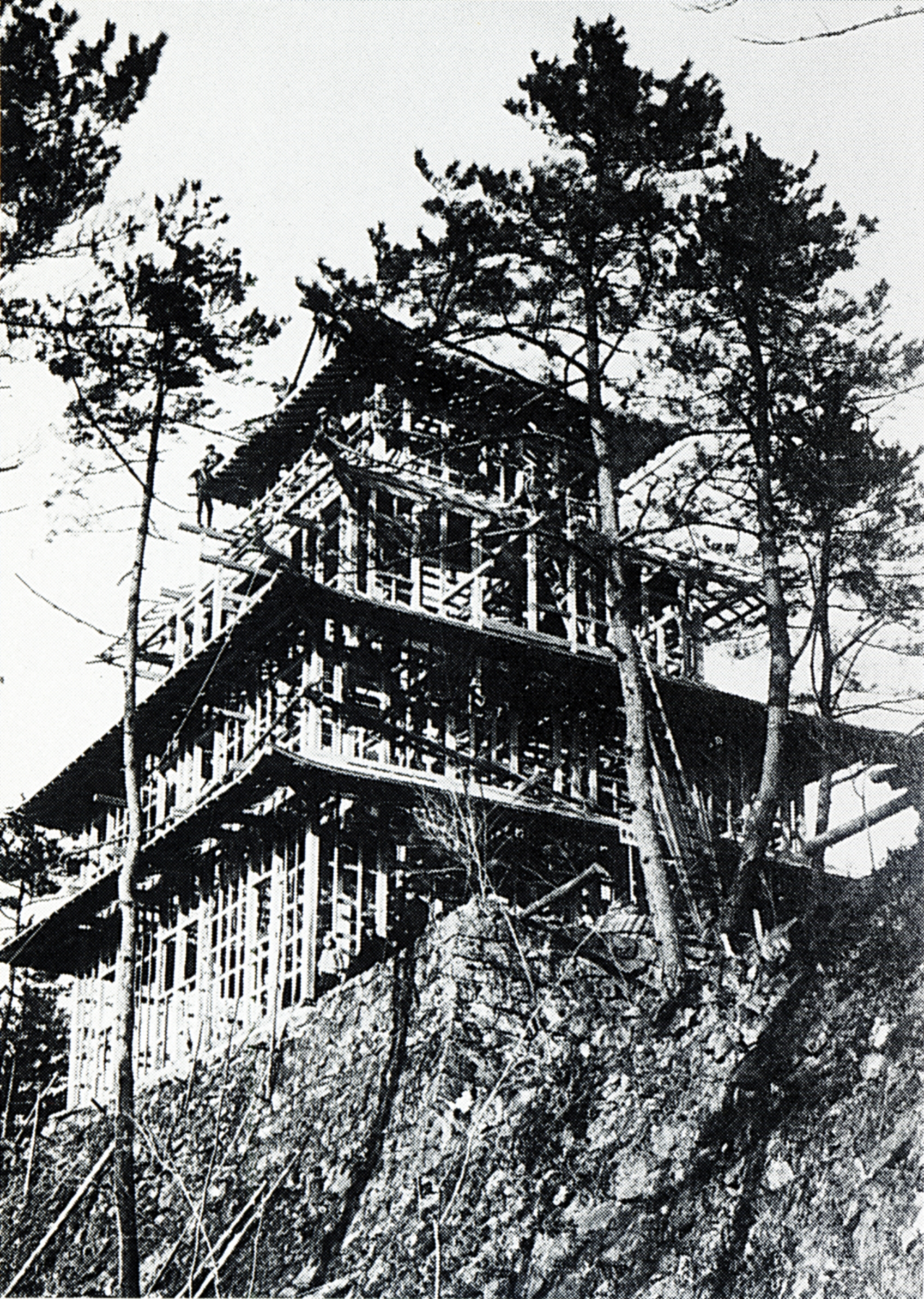
Rebuilding the tenshu in 1933

== See also ==
- Japanese castle

== Literature ==
- De Lange, William (2021). An Encyclopedia of Japanese Castles. Groningen: Toyo Press. pp. 600 pages. ISBN 978-9492722300.
- Schmorleitz, Morton S. (1974). Castles in Japan. Tokyo: Charles E. Tuttle Co. pp. 144–145. ISBN 0-8048-1102-4.
- Motoo, Hinago (1986). Japanese Castles. Tokyo: Kodansha. ISBN 0-87011-766-1.
- Mitchelhill, Jennifer (2004). Castles of the Samurai: Power and Beauty. Tokyo: Kodansha. ISBN 4-7700-2954-3.
- Turnbull, Stephen (2003). Japanese Castles 1540–1640. Osprey Publishing. ISBN 1-84176-429-9.
