= Kisai Domain =

Japanese domain of the Edo period

Kisai Domain (騎西藩, Kisai-han) was a Japanese domain of the Edo period, located in Musashi Province (modern-day Kisai, Saitama). The domain existed until 1632, when the last lord, Ōkubo Tadamoto, was moved to the Kanō Domain, and the Kisai holdings were then merged into the territory of the Kawagoe Domain.

== List of lords ==
- Matsui-Matsudaira clan (Fudai; 20,000 koku)
1. Yasushige
- Ōkubo clan (Fudai; 20,000 koku)
1. Tadatsune
2. Tadamoto
