= Tō Tsuneyori =

Japanese samurai (1401–1484)

Tō Tsuneyori 東常縁
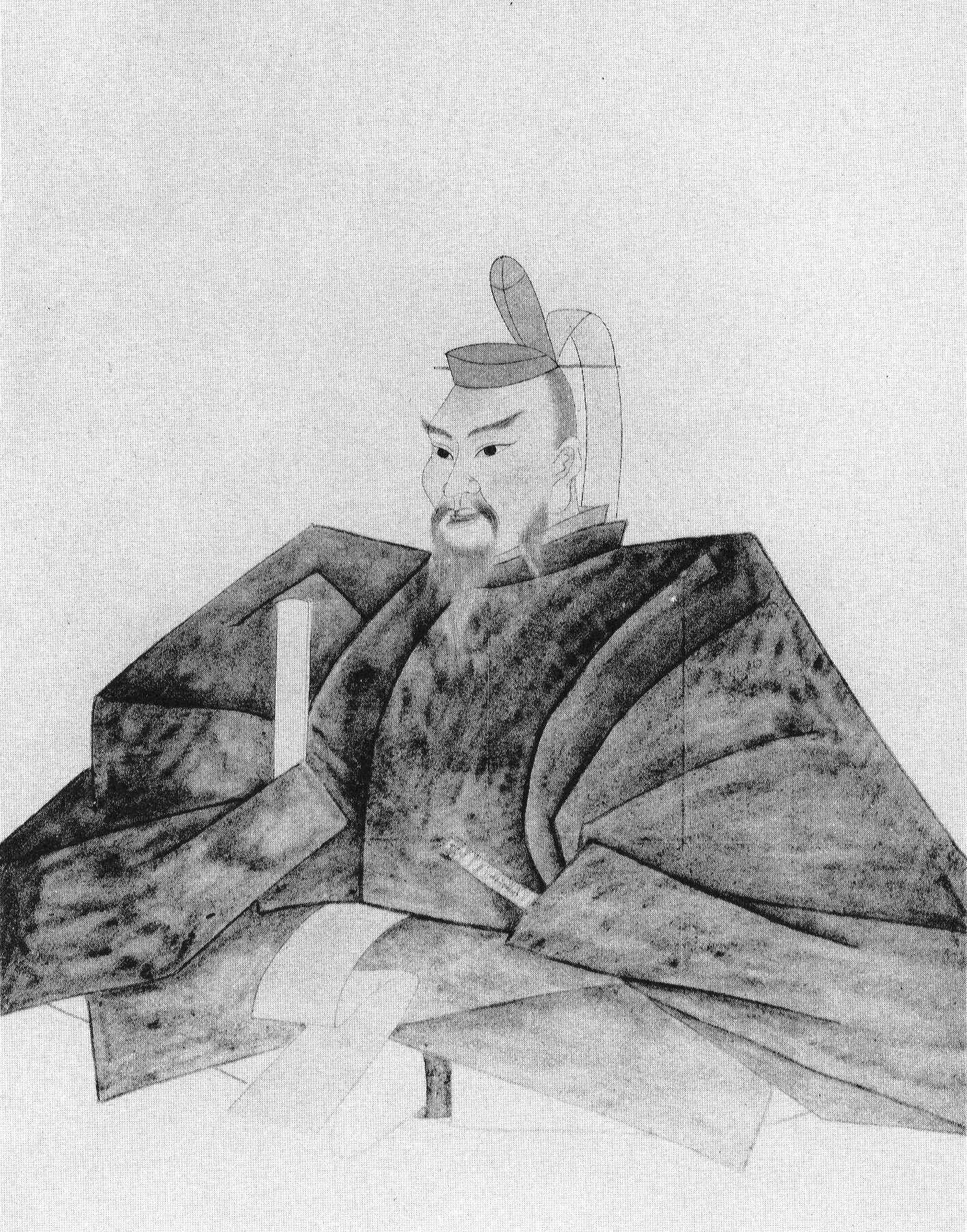
- Tō Tsuneyori in Kokubungaku meika shōzōshū
- Born: 1401
- Died: 1484 (aged 83)
- Other names: Tōyashū
- Occupations: samurai lord, poet
- Father: Tō Masuyuki

Tō Tsuneyori (東 常縁, 1401 - 1484) was a Japanese samurai lord and poet of the mid-Muromachi period and early Sengoku period. He was the lord of Shinowaki Castle in Mino Province and served as Governor of Shimotsuke Province. He is known as the founder of Kōkin Denju poetic school. He held the court rank of Junior Fifth Rank. He was also known as Tōyashū.

== Life ==
Tō Tsuneyori was born in 1401 as the son of Tō Masuyuki, Governor of Shimotsuke Province. He was adopted by his older half-brother Tō Ujikazu, and thus became the heir to the Tō family and the lord of Shinowaki Castle in Mino Province. He claimed descent from the Taira clan.

He studied waka poetry under Gyōkō of the Nijō poetic school and Shōtetsu from 1449 until 1451, when he officially became a disciple of Gyōkō.

In 1455, because of unrest in the Kanto region, he was sent to fight in various places in the region by the Ashikaga shogunate.

In September 1468, the family's territory in Gujō, Mino Province was usurped by the acting governor (shugo-dai) of Mino Province, Saitō Myōchin. At the time, Tsuneyori was in Musashi Province, and wrote a poem of lamentation. When Myōchin heard of Tsuneyori's poem, the two began a conversation in the form of waka poetry in 1469. The conversation led to Tsuneyori moving to the capital city Kyoto and receiving his territory back.

In 1471, Tsuneyori gave lectures to Inō Sōgi on Kokin Wakashū on two occasions. After this, he continued lecturing Sōgi on his interpretation on the poems, and eventually became the founder of Kōkin Denju, a school of Kokin Wakashū interpretation, with Sōgi becoming his disciple.

As a poetry scholar, he is known as the author of Tōyashū kikigaki, Shin-Kokin Wakashū kikigaki, and Tōyashū shūda. Additionally, he is also known for copying Ise Monogatari and Tsurezuregusa by hand.

He died in 1484 at the age of 83. There is also a theory that he died on April 18, 1494, at the age of 93, however 1484 is considered his actual year of death. His Dharma name is Soden.

== See also ==
- Ikkyū
- Imagawa Sadayo
- Ōta Dōkan
- Shōtetsu
