= Yukiyoshi Watanabe =

Japanese businessman

Yukiyoshi Watanabe (渡邉 幸義, Watanabe Yukiyoshi) is a Japanese entrepreneur and author of the business and personal management book Future Notes: The Open Road.

== Entrepreneurship ==
Watanabe is the founder and CEO of ISFnet Inc., a Tokyo-based integrated IT services company. He has pioneered the adoption of five-star hotel service standards in the IT sector.

== Philanthropy ==
In 2010, Watanabe established Future Dream Achievement, an NPO aimed at providing education, training, and employment, and advocating equal opportunity employment.

== Bibliography ==
- Future Notes: The Open Road (未来ノートで道は開ける!) (2008), Magazine House, Tokyo, ISBN 978-4-8387-1890-0
