= Sasayama Castle =

Castle in Japan

- 篠山城
- Tamba-Sasayama, Hyōgo, Japan
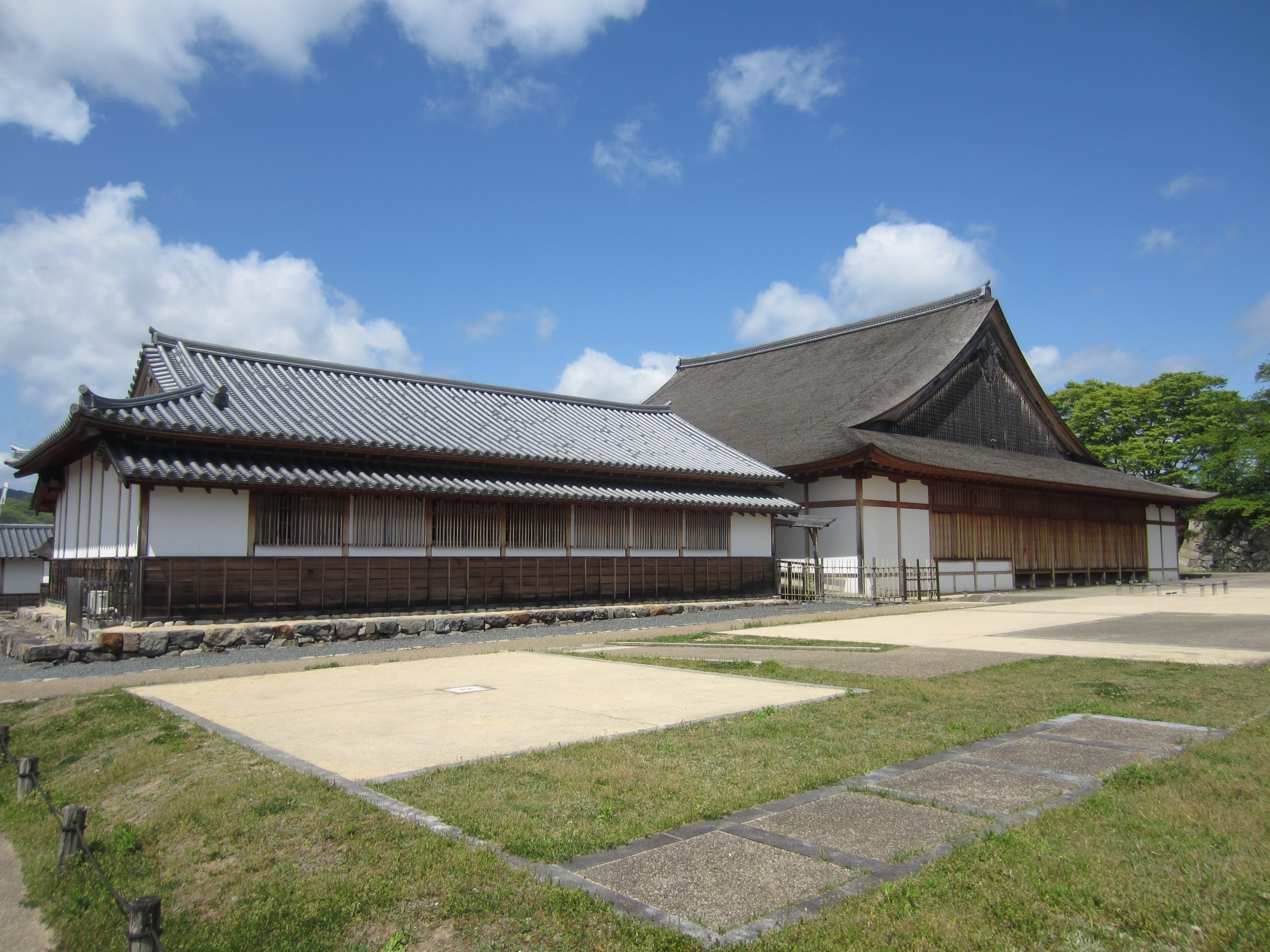
- The Ōshoin complex of Sasayama Castle

Site information
- Type: Flatland-style Japanese castle
- Owner: Matsudaira clan, Aoyama clan
- Condition: partially reconstructed

Location
- Sasayama Castle
- Location within Hyōgo Prefecture Location within Japan
- Coordinates: 35°4′22.16″N 135°13′5.71″E

Site history
- Built: 1608
- Built by: Matsudaira Yasushige
- Materials: Stone walls, moats
- Demolished: 1871
- National Historic Site of Japan

Sasayama Castle (篠山城, Sasayama-jō) is an early Edo Period Japanese castle located in the city of Tamba-Sasayama, Hyōgo, Japan. Its ruins have been protected as a National Historic Site since 1956.

== History ==
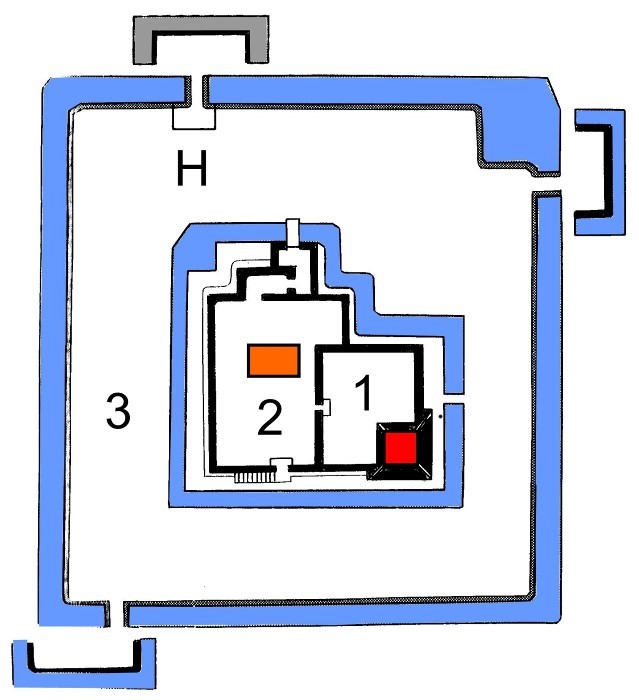
Plan of Sasayama Castle grounds

Sasayama Castle is located at the center of Tamba-Sasayama city. The Sasayama area is a strategic junction of highways from Kyoto to both the San'in region, and the San'yo regions of western Japan. Recognizing the importance of this location, after the Battle of Sekigahara, Tokugawa Ieyasu ordered the construction of Sasayama Castle to isolate Toyotomi Hideyori at Osaka Castle from the powerful feudal lords of western Japan, many of whom still had pro-Toyotomi loyalties. As the location was only three kilometers from a large mountain castle, Yakami Castle ruled by Matsudaira Yasushige (who may have been Tokugawa Ieyasu's illegitimate son), Yakami Castle was abolished and Matsudaira Yasushige relocated to Sasayama, where he became daimyō of Sasayama Domain. The castle was designed by Tōdō Takatora, construction was overseen by Ikeda Terumasa, and the materials and labor were provided by 20 daimyō, including the Fukushima, Kato clan, Hachisuka clan and Asano clan. By this style of construction, the fledgling Tokugawa Shogunate bled the powerful western daimyō of wealth and tested their loyalty to the new regime. To hasten completion of the castle, neither tenshu main keep nor corner yagura watchtowers were constructed, and the castle consisted a central area surrounded by stone walls and a moat. It was intended more as an administrative center rather than an actual castle for use in war. The second bailey contained the large daimyō residence, and the residences for samurai retainers and the castle town of Sasayama was laid out to the southwest and southeast of the castle. Sasayama Castle was held by the Aoyama clan for 123 years during the Edo period, from 1748 and until the castle was torn down in 1871. Almost all of the buildings in the castle were destroyed after the Meiji Restoration, except for the Ōshoin (Grand Hall). However, the Ōshoin was destroyed during a firebombing air raid by American forces in 1944. It was reconstructed in 2000.

The castle is 15 minutes by bus from Sasayamaguchi Station on the JR West Fukuchiyama Line. Sasayama Castle was listed as one of Japan's Top 100 Castles by the Japan Castle Foundation in 2006.

== Gallery ==
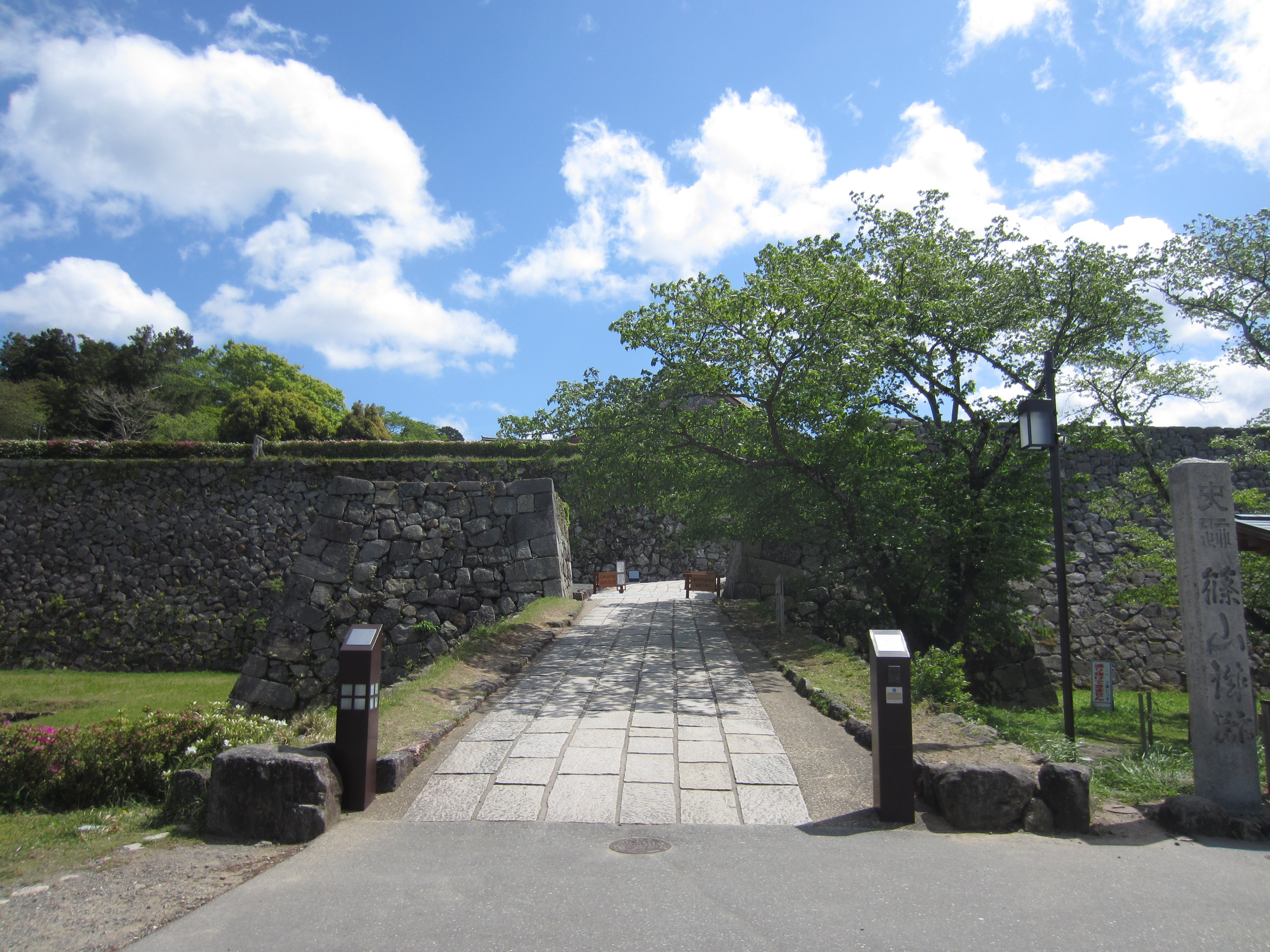
Uchi Gate

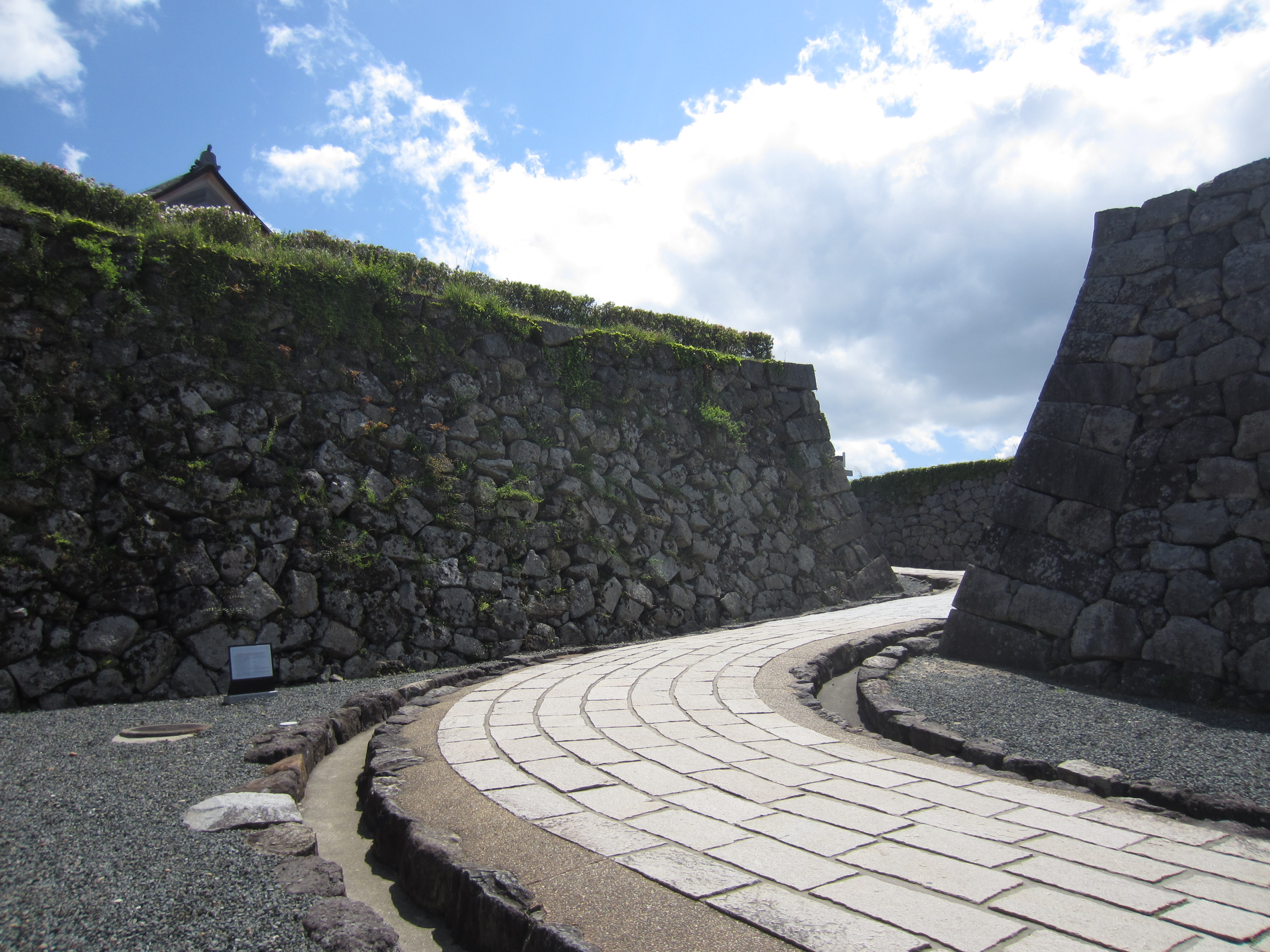
Kurogane Gate

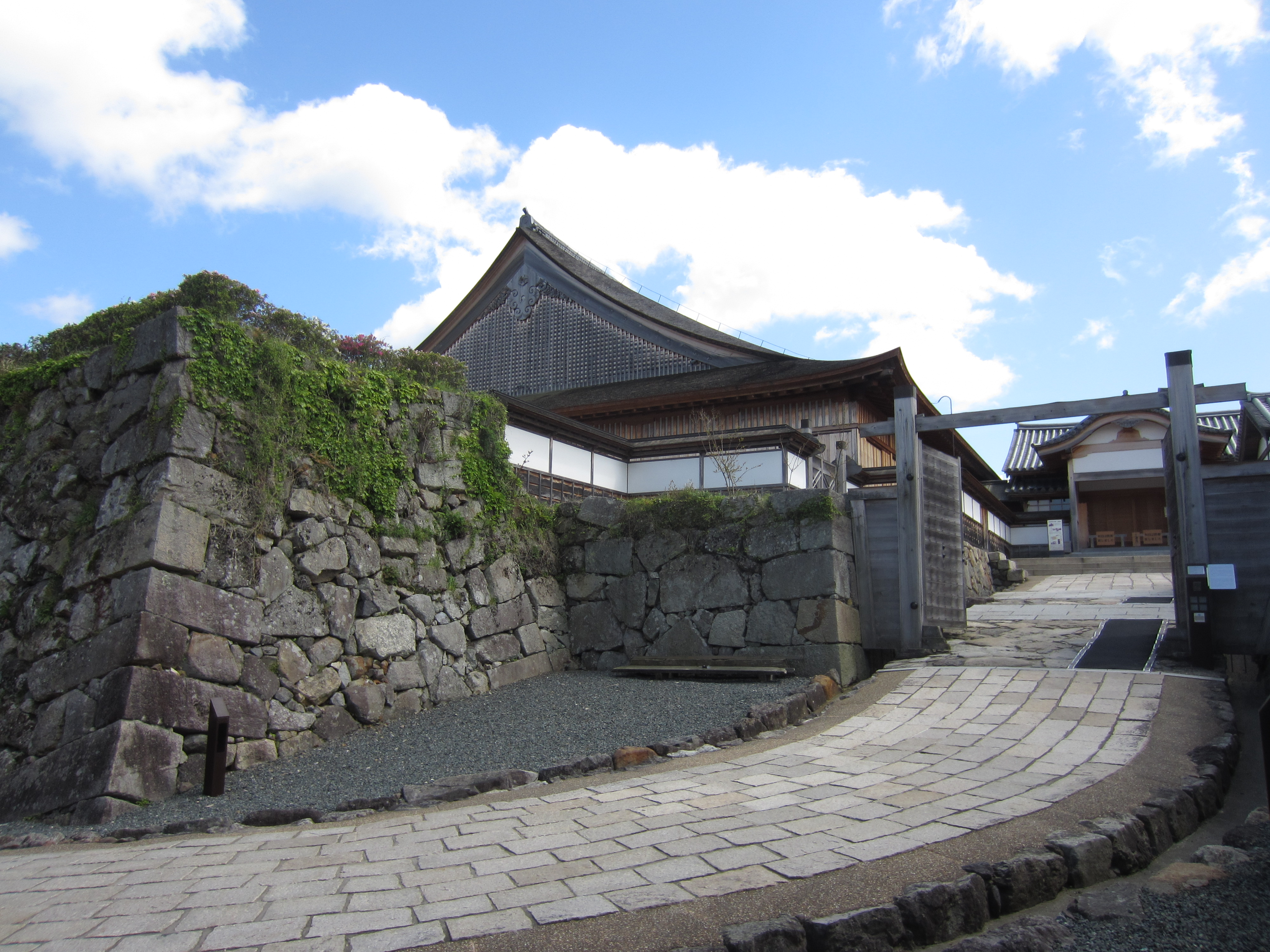

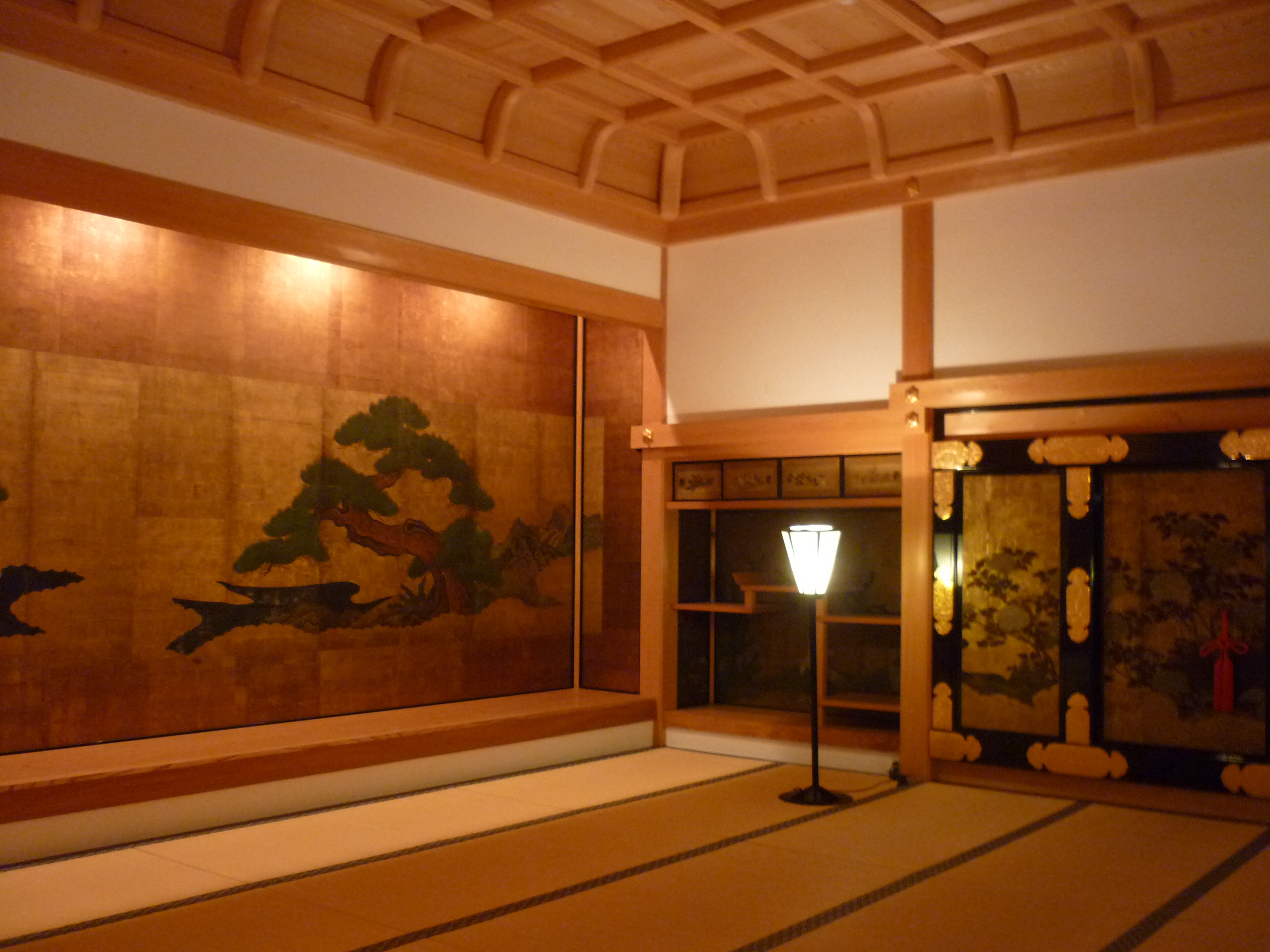
Interior of the Osho-in

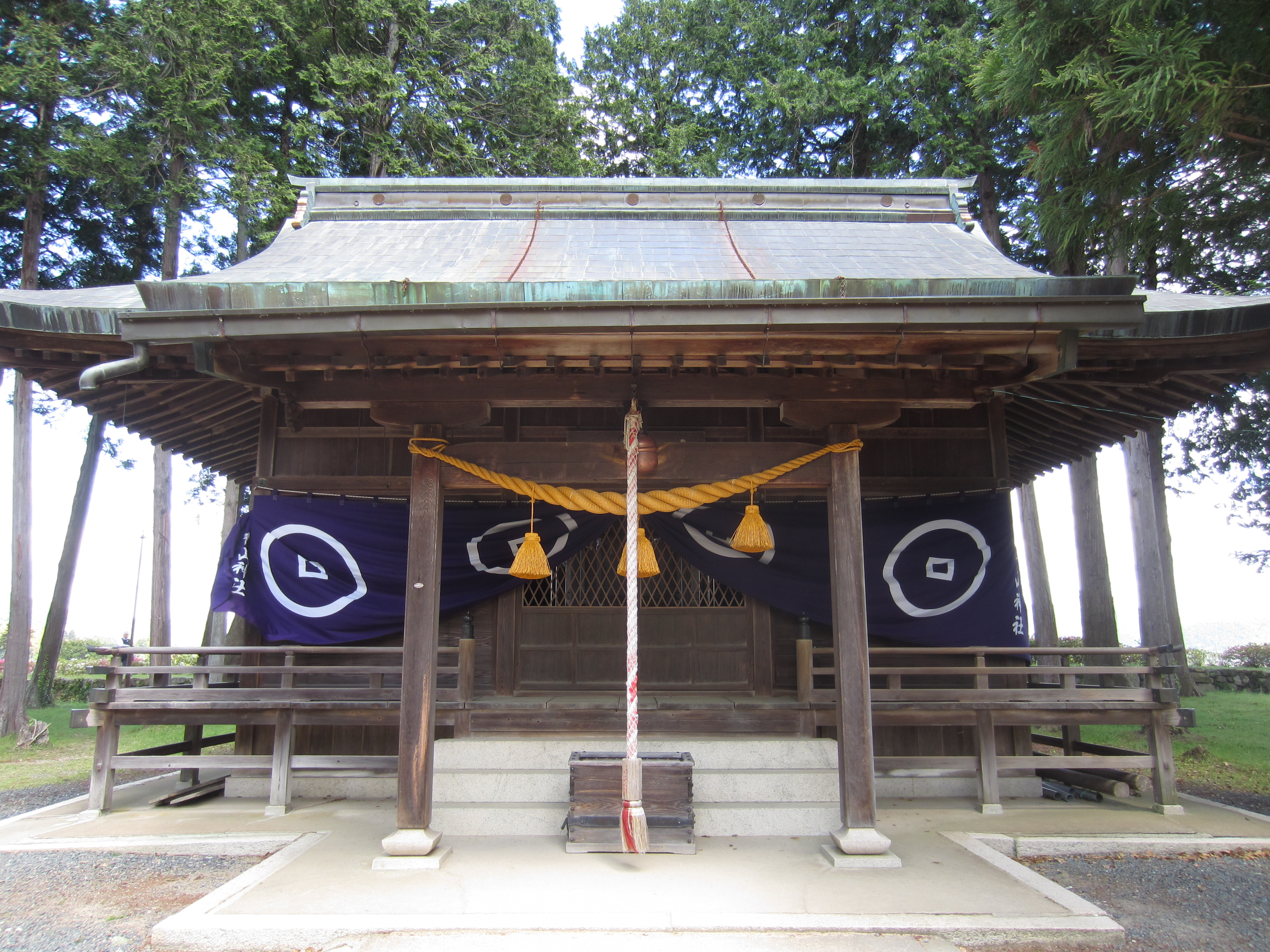
Aoyama Jinja

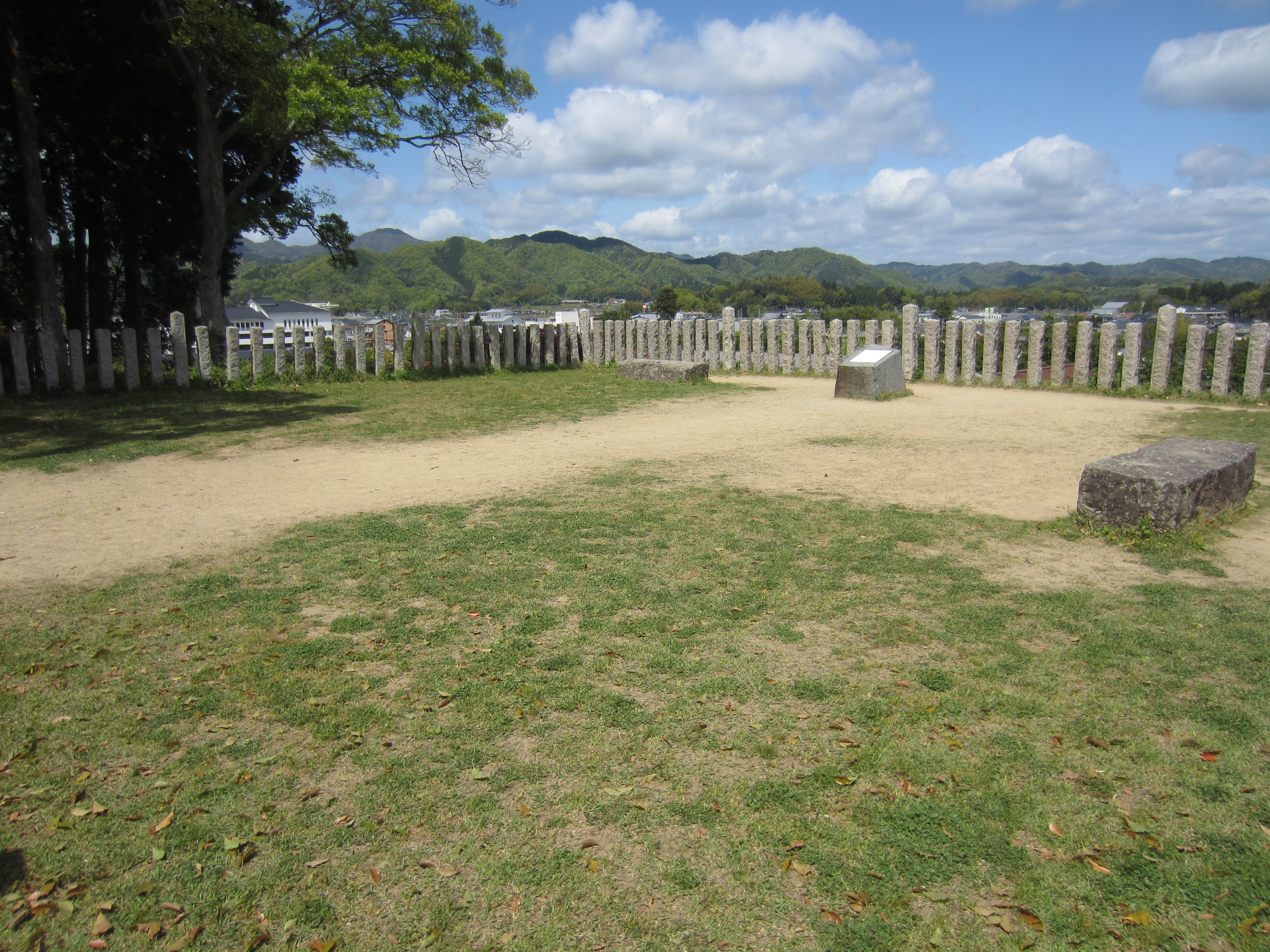
foundation for the tenshu

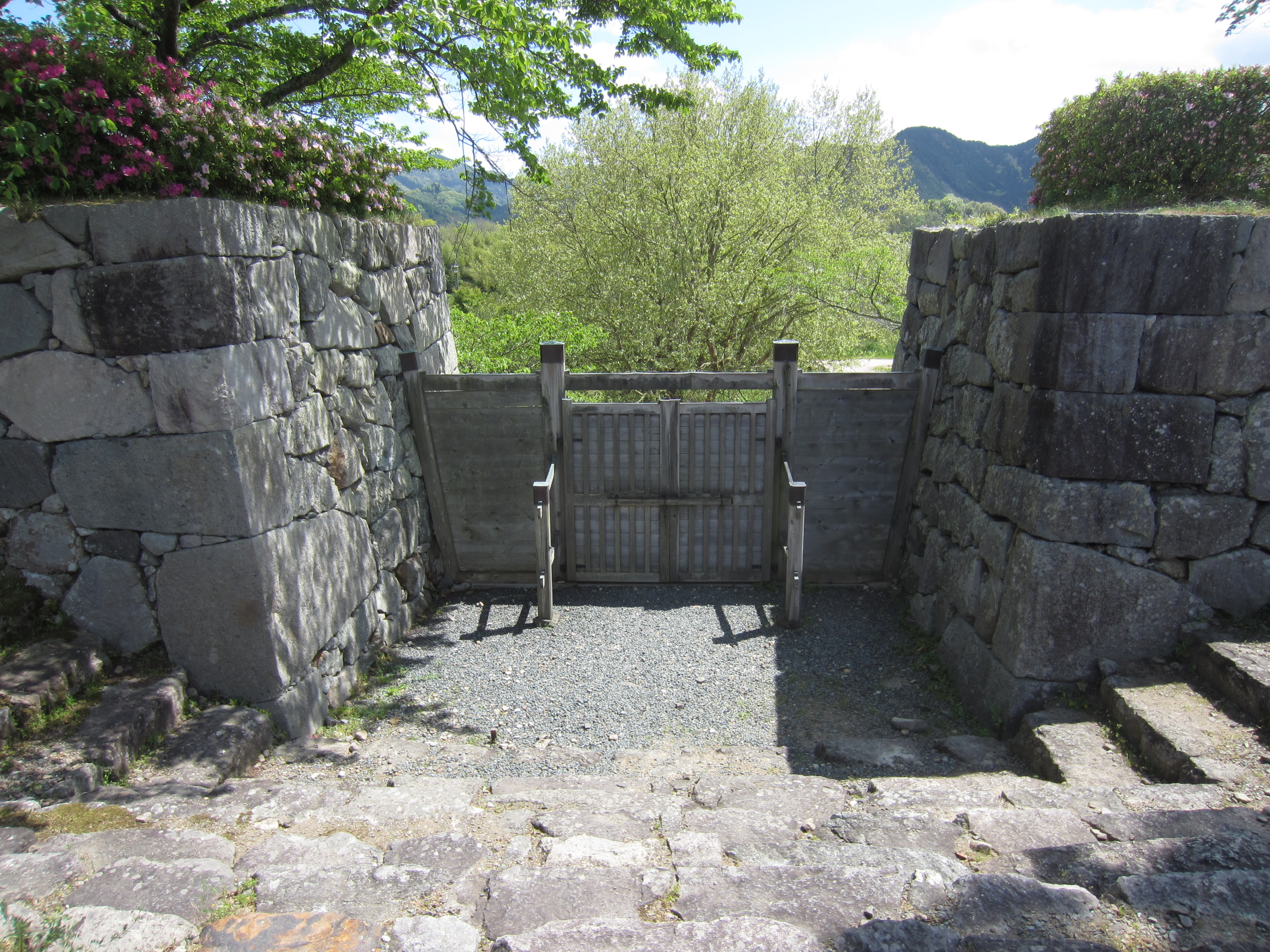
Uzumi Gate

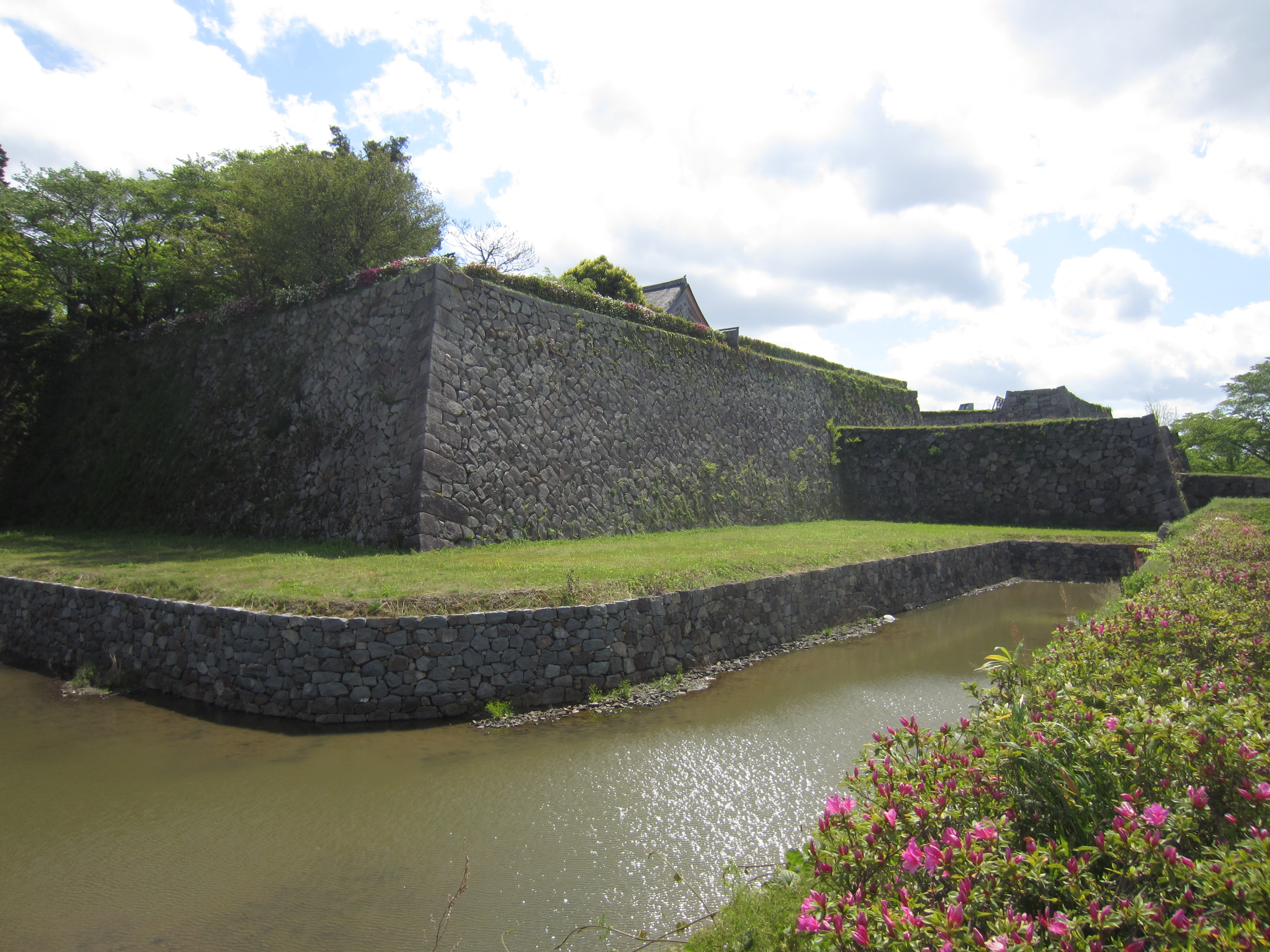
Inner moat

== See also ==
- List of Historic Sites of Japan (Hyōgo)

== Literature ==
- De Lange, William (2021). An Encyclopedia of Japanese Castles. Groningen: Toyo Press. pp. 600 pages. ISBN 978-9492722300.
