= Matsudaira Yasushige =

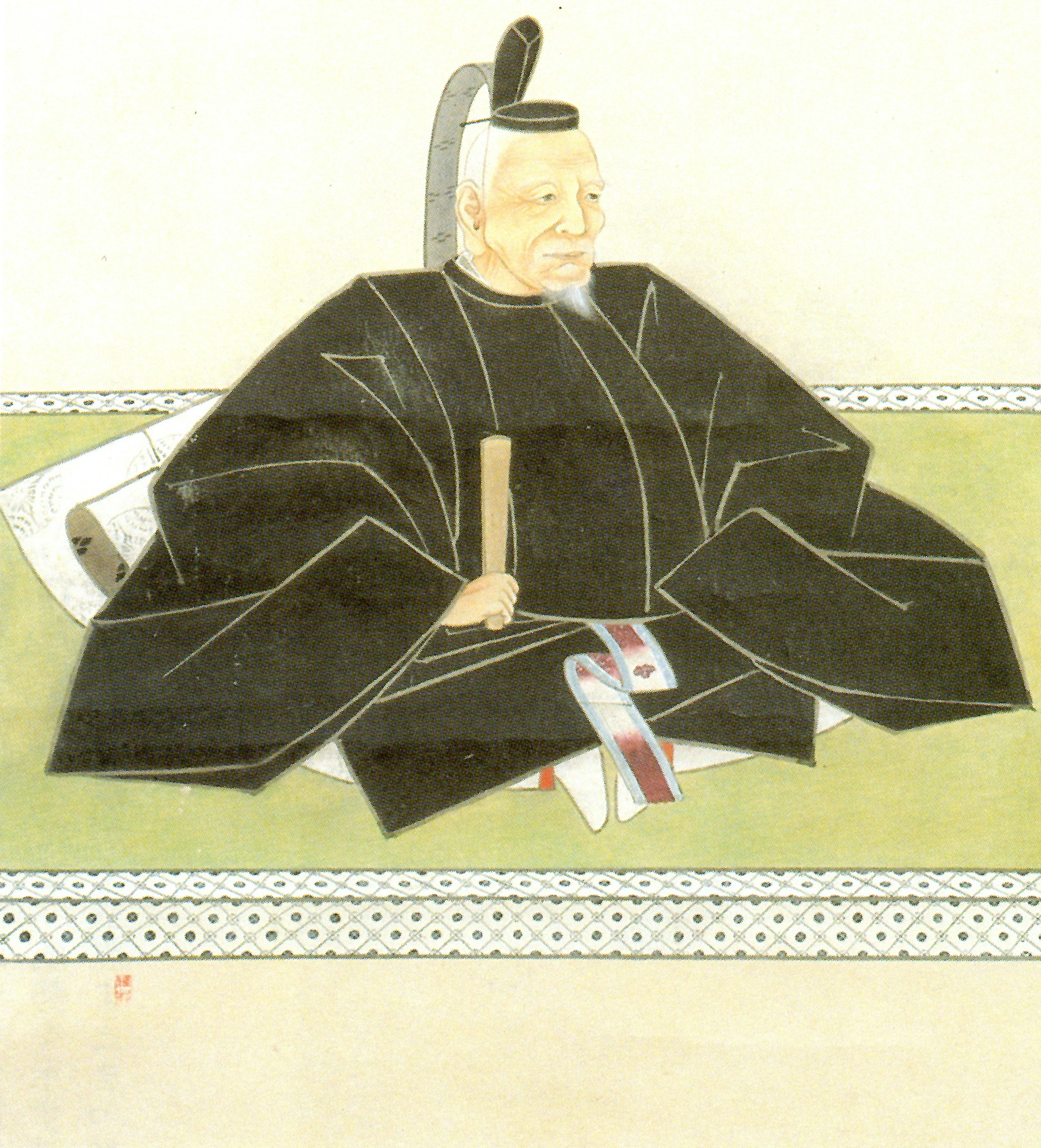

First (Matsui-Matsudaira) Lord of Kishiwada
- In office 1619–1640
- Preceded by: Koide Yoshihide
- Succeeded by: Matsudaira Yasuteru

Personal details
- Born: 1568
- Died: August 14, 1640 (aged 71–72)
- Parent: Matsudaira Yasuchika
- Relatives: Tobai-in (sister); Ii Naomasa (brother-in-law)

Matsudaira Yasushige (松平 康重; 1568 – August 14, 1640) was a Japanese samurai of the Azuchi-Momoyama through early Edo periods. He was the family head of the Matsui-Matsudaira, a family which received the Matsudaira name as an honorific following his father's service to Tokugawa Ieyasu. Yasushige ended his life as daimyō of Kishiwada han. There is a rumour claiming that he is Ieyasu's illegitimate son.

| Preceded by none | Matsui-Matsudaira clan 1590-1640 | Succeeded by Matsudaira Yasuteru |
| Preceded by none | (Matsui-Matsudaira) Lord of Kisai; 1590-1601 | Succeeded by Ōkubo Tadatsune |
| Preceded by none | (Matsui-Matsudaira) Lord of Kasama; 1601-1608 | Succeeded by Ogasawara Yoshitsugu |
| Preceded by Maeda Shigekatsu | (Matsui-Matsudaira) Lord of Yakami; 1608 | Succeeded by none |
| Preceded by none | (Matsui-Matsudaira) Lord of Sasayama; 1608-1619 | Succeeded by Matsudaira Nobuyoshi |
| Preceded by Koide Yoshihide | (Matsui-Matsudaira) Lord of Kishiwada; 1619-1640 | Succeeded by Matsudaira Yasuteru |
