= Aoyama clan =

The Aoyama clan (青山氏, Aoyama-uji) was a Japanese kin group.

== History ==
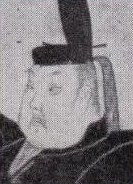
Fujiwara no Ietasda

The clan claims descent from Fujiwara no Ietada (1062–1136).

The clan's origins were in Kōzuke Province; however, members of the family moved to Mikawa Province and served the Matsudaira clan (later known as the Tokugawa clan). The Aoyama became a daimyō family during the Edo period.

The Aoyama clan held the Sasayama Castle, located at Sasayama, Hyōgo Prefecture, for 123 years during the Edo period. The first Aoyama lordship of the castle started in 1748, and continued until the castle was torn down in 1871.
