= Beppyo shrine =

Category of Shinto shrine

A Beppyō shrine (Beppyō Jinja (別表神社)) is a category of Shinto shrine, as defined by the Association of Shinto Shrines. They are considered to be remarkable in some way, and thus given a higher status than other shrines. It is considered the successor to the more detailed modern system of ranked Shinto shrines.

== Overview ==
With the abolition of the state administration of shrines on February 2, 1946, the official system of shrine rankings (modern shrine rankings system) was abolished, and another system was established in 1948 to replace it. After the abolition of the shrine rating system, all shrines were considered to be on an equal footing (except for Ise Shrine). However, since it would be inconvenient to treat the former official national shrines and some of the larger shrines in the same way as ordinary shrines with regard to the advancement and retirement of Shinto priests, the "Regulations Concerning the Advancement and Retirement of Officials and Employees" stipulate that special treatment be given to them. Since these shrines are listed in the Beppyō of the regulations, they are called "Beppyō Shrines".

The Beppyō shrine will be given special treatment in terms of personnel, as follows:

- If a certain level of standards are met, a gonin priest is allowed to be appointed under a priest.
- Guji and Guji are not appointed unless they have a rank above the Ming floor (at a general shrine, they are above the Gonjo floor).
- Only those who have a rank above the front floor can be appointed (at a general shrine, the floor is above the direct floor).
- Gonjoi is appointed only to those who have a rank above the right floor (at a general shrine, it is above the direct floor).
- The status of the priest / Guji priest during his tenure is special grade, and those other than the first and second grades are second grade.
- Appointment and dismissal of priests and priests is not a matter of mandate of the director of the shrine of each prefecture (direct appointment and dismissal of the governing of the Association of Shinto Shrines)

In 1951, the Association of Shinto Shrines issued a notice titled "Selection of Shrines for Beppyō", which outlined the criteria for selecting shrines other than those listed in the government's Beppyō shrine list. The criteria were as follows:

- History
- Status of facilities related to the shrine, such as shrine buildings and precincts
- Number of full-time priests
- Economic situation in the last three years
- Activities of the shrine
- Number and distribution of Ujiko worshippers

As a result of this provision, the number of Beppyō shrines, mainly former prefectural shrines and Protectorate Shrines designated by the Minister of Home Affairs, has gradually increased to 353 as of 2006.

Beppyō shrine is not a rating of shrines, like the rating of a shrine, but a distinction that concerns only the personnel of the Shinto priests. However, the shrines listed in Beppyō are relatively large in terms of the number of shrines, precincts, and priests, and are generally regarded as a kind of rating. In addition, Ise Jingu is not included in the Beppyō shrine as a separate shrine, and the Grand Priest of Jingu is appointed and dismissed by the Imperial Court according to the "Jingu Rules", which gives it special treatment.

== List of Beppyō shrines ==
| Name | | Settlement | In the formula | Modern system of ranked Shinto Shrines | Other shrines | Year of column |
|---|---|---|---|---|---|---|
Hokkaido
| Hokkaidō Shrine | | Sapporo Chūō-ku, Sapporo | | Kanpei-taisha (官大) | Ezo Ichinomiya | 1948 |
| Hakodate Hachiman Shrine | | Hakodate | | Kokuhei Chūsha (国中) | | 1948 |
| Sumiyoshi Shrine | | Otaru | | Prefectural Shrine (県社) | | 1955 |
| Kamikawa Shrine | | Asahikawa | | Prefectural Shrine (県社) | | 1955 |
| Obihiro Shrine | | Obihiro | | Prefectural Shrine (県社) | | 1976 |
| Tarumaezan Shrine | | Tomakomai | | Prefectural Shrine (県社) | | 1986 |
Aomori Prefecture
| Iwakiyama Jinja | | Hirosaki | | Kokuhei Shōsha (国小) | Mutsu Province Ichinomiya | 1948 |
| Saruka Jinja | | Hirakawa, Aomori | | Prefectural Shrine (県社) | | 1959 |
Iwate Prefecture
| Komagata Shrine | | Ōshū, Iwate | Shikinai Shosha | Kokuhei Shōsha (国小) | Rikuchū Province Ichinomiya | 1948 |
| Shiwa Inari Shrine | | Shiwa District, Iwate Shiwa, Iwate | － | Prefectural Shrine (県社) | | |
| Morioka Hachimangū | | Morioka | － | Prefectural Shrine (県社) | | |
Miyagi Prefecture
| Shiogama Jinja | | Shiogama | Myojin Taisha (名神) | Kokuhei Chūsha (国中) | Mutsu Province Ichinomiya | 1948 |
| Kinkasan Shrine | | Ishinomaki | Shōsha Ronsha (小社論社) | Prefectural Shrine (県社) | | 1952 |
| Takekoma Inari Shrine | | Iwanuma | | Prefectural Shrine (県社) | | |
| Miyagiken Gokoku Shrine | | Sendai Aoba-ku, Sendai | － | Gokoku Shrine (護国) | | |
| Ōsaki Hachimangū | | Sendai Aoba-ku, Sendai | | Village shrines (村社) | | 2016 |
Akita Prefecture
| Koshiō Shrine | | Akita (city) | Kokushi genzaisha | Kokuhei Shōsha (国小) | | 1948 |
| Taiheiyama Miyoshi Shrine | | Akita (city) | | Prefectural Shrine (県社) | | |
| Akita Suwa Shrine | | Senboku District, Akita Misato, Akita | | Prefectural Shrine (県社) | | |
| Akita Prefecture Gokoku Shrine | | Akita (city) | － | Gokoku Shrine (護国) | | |
Yamagata Prefecture
| Three Mountains of Dewa | Gassan Shrine | Higashitagawa District, Yamagata Shōnai, Yamagata | Myojin Taisha (名神) | Kanpei-taisha (官大) | | 1948 |
| Three Mountains of Dewa | Dewa Shrine | Tsuruoka | Shikinai Shosha | Kokuhei Shōsha (国小) | | 1948 |
| Three Mountains of Dewa | Yudonosan Shrine | Tsuruoka | | Kokuhei Shōsha (国小) | | 1948 |
| Chōkaisan Ōmonoimi Shrine | | Akumi District, Yamagata Yuza | Myojin Taisha (名神) | Kokuhei Chūsha (国中) | Dewa Province Ichinomiya | 1948 |
| Uesugi Shrine | | Yonezawa, Yamagata | － | Bekkaku kanpeisha (別官) | | 1948 |
| Kinpō Jinja | | Tsuruoka | | Prefectural Shrine (県社) | | |
| Kumano Shrine | | Nan'yō, Yamagata | | Prefectural Shrine (県社) | | |
| Yamagata Prefecture Gokoku Shrine | | Yamagata | － | Gokoku Shrine (護国) | | 1953 |
| Ayukai Hachimangu | | Nishiokitama District, Yamagata Shirataka | － | Prefectural Shrine (県社) | | |
| Yachi Hachimangu | | Nishimurayama District, Yamagata Kahoku, Yamagata | － | Prefectural Shrine (県社) | | |
| Chōkai gassan ryōsho-gu | | Yamagata | － | Prefectural Shrine (県社) | | 1961 |
| Sagae Hachimangu | | Sagae | － | Prefectural Shrine (県社) | | |
| Hokutan Shrine | | Shōnai, Yamagata | － | District Shrine (郷社) | | 1961 |
Fukushima Prefecture
| Tsutsukowake Shrine | | Higashishirakawa District, Fukushima Tanagura, Fukushima | Myojin Ronsha (名神論社) | Kokuhei Chūsha (国中) | Mutsu Province Ichinomiya | 1948 |
| Isasumi Shrine | | Ōnuma District, Fukushima Aizumisato | Myojin Taisha (名神) | Kokuhei Chūsha (国中) | Fukushima Ninomiya・Iwashiro Province Ichinomiya | 1948 |
| Tsutsukowake Shrine | | Tanagura, Fukushima | Myojin Ronsha (名神論社) | Kokuhei Chūsha (国中) | Fukushima Ichinomiya | 1948 |
| Ryōzen Shrine | | Date, Fukushima | － | Bekkaku kanpeisha (別官) | | 1948 |
| Fukushima Gokoku Shrine | | Fukushima | － | Gokoku Shrine (護国) | | |
Ibaraki Prefecture
| Kashima Shrine | | Kashima, Ibaraki | Myojin Taisha (名神) | Kanpei-taisha (官大) | Hitachi Province Ichinomiya・Chokusaisha | 1948 |
| Oarai Isosaki Shrine | | Higashiibaraki District, Ibaraki Ōarai, Ibaraki | Myojin Taisha (名神) | Kokuhei Chūsha (国中) | | 1948 |
| Sakatsura Isosaki Shrine | | Hitachinaka, Ibaraki | Myojin Taisha (名神) | Kokuhei Chūsha (国中) | | 1948 |
| Tokiwa Jinja | | Mito, Ibaraki | － | Bekkaku kanpeisha (別官) | | 1948 |
| Tsukubasan Shrine | | Tsukuba | Myojin Taisha (名神)・Shikinai Shosha | Prefectural Shrine (県社) | | |
| Mito Tōshō-gū | | Mito, Ibaraki | － | Prefectural Shrine (県社) | | 1966 |
| Osugi Shrine | | Inashiki | | District Shrine (郷社) | | |
| Kasama Inari Shrine | | Kasama, Ibaraki | | Village shrines (村社) | | |
| Ibaraki Prefectural Gokoku Shrine | | Mito, Ibaraki | － | Gokoku Shrine (護国) | | |
Tochigi
| Futarasan jinja | | Tochigi Nikkō | Myojin Ronsha (名神論社) | Kokuhei Chūsha (国中) | Shimotsuke Province Ichinomiya | 1948 |
| Utsunomiya Futarayama Jinja | | Tochigi Utsunomiya | Myojin Ronsha (名神論社) | Kokuhei Chūsha (国中) | Shimotsuke Province Ichinomiya | 1948 |
| Karasawayama Shrine | | Tochigi Sano, Tochigi | － | Bekkaku kanpeisha (別官) | | 1948 |
Gunma Prefecture
| Nukisaki Shrine | | Tomioka, Gunma | Myojin Taisha (名神) | Kokuhei Chūsha (国中) | Kozuke Ichinomiya | 1948 |
| Gunma Gokoku Shrine | | Takasaki | － | Gokoku Shrine (護国) | | 1996 |
Saitama Prefecture
| Hikawa Shrine (Saitama) | | Saitama (city) Ōmiya-ku, Saitama | Myojin Taisha (名神) | Kanpei-taisha (官大) | Saitama Ichinomiya( third Shrine)・Chokusaisha | 1948 |
| Kanasana Shrine | | Kodama District, Saitama Kamikawa, Saitama | Myojin Taisha (名神) | Kanpei Chūsha (官中) | Saitama Ninomiya | 1948 |
| Chichibu Shrine | | Chichibu, Saitama | Shikinai Shosha | Kokuhei Shōsha (国小) | Chichibu Province Ichinomiya | 1948 |
| Mitsumine Shrine | | Chichibu, Saitama | | Prefectural Shrine (県社) | | |
| Hodosan Shrine | | Nagatoro, Saitama | | Prefectural Shrine (県社) | | |
| Yakyu Inari Shrine | | Higashimatsuyama, Saitama | | Prefectural Shrine (県社) | | |
| Hikawa Shrine (Kawagoe) | | Kawagoe, Saitama | | Prefectural Shrine (県社) | | |
| Washinomiya Shrine | | Kuki, Saitama | | Prefectural Shrine (県社) | | 2001 |
| Koma Shrine | | Hidaka, Saitama | | Prefectural Shrine (県社) | | 2006 |
Chiba Prefecture
| Awa Shrine | | Tateyama, Chiba | Myojin Taisha (名神) | Kanpei-taisha (官大) | Awa Province (Chiba) Ichinomiya | 1948 |
| Katori Shrine | | Katori, Chiba | Myojin Taisha (名神) | Kanpei-taisha (官大) | Shimōsa Province Ichinomiya・Chokusaisha | 1948 |
| Tamasaki Shrine | | Chōsei District Ichinomiya, Chiba | Myojin Taisha (名神) | Kokuhei Chūsha (国中) | Kazusa Province Ichinomiya | 1948 |
| Komikado Shrine | | Narita, Chiba | － | Bekkaku kanpeisha (別官) | | 1948 |
| Chiba Gokoku Shrine | | Chiba (city) Chūō-ku, Chiba | － | Gokoku Shrine (護国) | | 1996 |
Tokyo
| Meiji Shrine | | Tokyo Shibuya | － | Kanpei-taisha (官大) | Chokusaisha | 2010 |
| Hie Shrine | | Chiyoda, Tokyo | － | Kanpei-taisha (官大) | Chokusaisha | 1948 |
| Ōkunitama Shrine | | Fuchū, Tokyo | | Kanpei-shōsha (官小) | Chokusaisha・Musashi Province Sōja (Shinto) | 1948 |
| Tokyo Daijingu | | Chiyoda, Tokyo | － | | Former Tokyo Branch Office of Jingu Shichou | |
| Nogi Shrine (Tokyo) | | Minato, Tokyo | － | Metropolitan Shrine (府社) | | |
| Kanda Shrine | | Chiyoda, Tokyo | | Metropolitan Shrine (府社) | Chokusaisha | |
| Tōgō Shrine | | Tokyo Shibuya | － | Metropolitan Shrine (府社) | | |
| Ōmiya Hachiman Shrine (Tokyo) | | Suginami | － | Metropolitan Shrine (府社) | | 1966 |
| Yushima Tenmangū | | Bunkyō | | Metropolitan Shrine (府社) | | 2001 |
| Igusa Hachimangu | | Suginami | － | District Shrine (郷社) | | 1966 |
Kanagawa Prefecture
| Samukawa Shrine | | Kōza District, Kanagawa Samukawa | Myojin Taisha (名神) | Kokuhei Chūsha (国中) | Sagami Province Ichinomiya | 1948 |
| Tsurugaoka Hachimangū | | Kamakura | － | Kokuhei Chūsha (国中) | Sometimes referred to as Ichinomiya, Sagami Province. | 1948 |
| Hakone Shrine | | Ashigarashimo District, Kanagawa Hakone | | Kokuhei Shōsha (国小) | | 1948 |
| Enoshima Shrine | | Fujisawa, Kanagawa | | Prefectural Shrine (県社) | | |
| Iseyama Kotaijingu | | Yokohama | － | Prefectural Shrine (県社) | shrine of religious sect | 1953加列 2003削除 2016再加列 |
| Hiratsuka Hachimangu | | Hiratsuka | | Prefectural Shrine (県社) | | |
| Hōtoku Ninomiya Shrine | | Odawara | － | Prefectural Shrine (県社) | | |
| Inage Shrine | | Kawasaki, Kanagawa Kawasaki-ku, Kawasaki | | District Shrine (郷社) | | 1966 |
| Oyama Aburi Shrine | | Isehara, Kanagawa | Shikinai Shosha | Prefectural Shrine (県社) | | |
Niigata Prefecture
| Yahiko Shrine | | Nishikanbara District, Niigata Yahiko, Niigata | Myojin Taisha (名神) | Kokuhei Chūsha (国中) | Echigo Province Ichinomiya | 1948 |
| Watatsu Shrine | | Sado, Niigata | Shikinai Shosha | Kokuhei Shōsha (国小) | Sado Province Ichinomiya | 1948 |
| Niigata Gokoku Shrine | | Niigata (city) Chūō-ku, Niigata | － | Gokoku Shrine (護国) | | |
| Hakusan Shrine | | Niigata (city) Chūō-ku, Niigata | Shōsha Ronsha (小社論社) | Prefectural Shrine (県社) | | |
Toyama Prefecture
| Takase Shrine | | Nanto, Toyama | Shikinai Shosha | Kokuhei Shōsha (国小) | Toyama Ichinomiya | 1948 |
| Oyama Shrine (Tateyama) | | Nakaniikawa District, Toyama Tateyama, Toyama | Shikinai Shosha | Kokuhei Shōsha (国小) | Toyama Ichinomiya | 1948 |
| Imizu Jinja | | Takaoka, Toyama | Myojin Ronsha (名神論社) | Kokuhei Chūsha (国中) | Etchū Province Ichinomiya | 1948 |
| Toyamaken Gokoku Shrine | | Toyama city | － | Gokoku Shrine (護国) | | |
| Hie Shrine (Toyama) | | Toyama city | － | Prefectural Shrine (県社) | | 1968 |
Ishikawa Prefecture
| Shirayama Hime Shrine | | Hakusan, Ishikawa | Shikinai Shosha | Kokuhei Chūsha (国中) | Kaga Province Ichinomiya | 1948 |
| Sugo Ishibe Shrine | | Kaga, Ishikawa | Shikinai Shosha | Kokuhei Shōsha (国小) | Kaga Province Ninomiya | 1948 |
| Oyama Shrine (Ishikawa) | | Kanazawa | － | Bekkaku kanpeisha (別官) | | 1948 |
| Onominato Shrine | | Kanazawa | Shikinai Shosha | Prefectural Shrine (県社) | | 1966 |
| Ishikawa Gokoku Shrine | | Kanazawa | － | Gokoku Shrine (護国) | | |
Fukui Prefecture
| Kehi Shrine | | Tsuruga, Fukui | Myojin Taisha (名神) | Kanpei-taisha (官大) | Echizen Province Ichinomiya | 1948 |
| Kanegasaki-gū | | Tsuruga, Fukui | － | Kanpei-chūsha (官中) | | 1948 |
| Wakasahiko Shrine | | Obama, Fukui | Myojin Taisha (名神) | Kokuhei Chūsha (国中) | Wakasa Province Ichinomiya | 1948 |
| Tsurugi Shrine | | Nyū District, Fukui Echizen, Fukui (town) | Shikinai Shosha | Kokuhei Shōsha (国小) | Echizen Province Ninomiya | 1948 |
| Fujishima Shrine | | Fukui (city) | － | Bekkaku kanpeisha (別官) | | 1948 |
| Fukui Shrine | | Fukui (city) | － | Bekkaku kanpeisha (別官) | | 1948 |
| Fukui Gokoku Shrine | | Fukui (city) | － | Gokoku Shrine (護国) | | |
| Shinmei Shrine | | Fukui (city) | | Prefectural Shrine (県社) | | |
Yamanashi Prefecture
| Ichinomiya Asama Shrine | | Fuefuki | Myojin Ronsha (名神論社) | Kokuhei Chūsha (国中) | Kai Province Ichinomiya | 1948 |
| Kitaguchi Hongu Fuji Asama Shrine | | Fujiyoshida | | Prefectural Shrine (県社) | | |
| Fuji Omuro Asama Shrine | | Minamitsuru District, Yamanashi Fujikawaguchiko | | Prefectural Shrine (県社) | | 1971 |
| Takeda Shrine | | Kōfu | － | Prefectural Shrine (県社) | | |
| Fuji Yamashitamiya Komuro Asama Shrine | | Fujiyoshida | | District Shrine (郷社) | | 1957 |
| Yamanashi Gokoku Shrine | | Kōfu | － | Gokoku Shrine (護国) | | |
Nagano Prefecture
| Suwa-taisha | Kamisha Hongu | Suwa, Nagano | Myojin Taisha (名神) | Kanpei-taisha (官大) | Shinano Province Ichinomiya | 1948 |
| Suwa-taisha | Kamisha Maemiya | Chino, Nagano | Myojin Taisha (名神) | Kanpei-taisha (官大) | Shinano Province Ichinomiya | 1948 |
| Suwa-taisha | Shimosha Harumiya | Suwa District, Nagano Shimosuwa | Myojin Taisha (名神) | Kanpei-taisha (官大) | Shinano Province Ichinomiya | 1948 |
| Suwa-taisha | Shimosha Akimiya | Shimosuwa Town, Suwa District | Myojin Taisha (名神) | Kanpei-taisha (官大) | Shinano Province Ichinomiya | 1948 |
| Ikushimatarushima Shrine | | Ueda, Nagano | Myojin Taisha (名神) | Kokuhei Chūsha (国中) | | 1948 |
| Togakushi Shrine | | Nagano (city) | | Kokuhei Shōsha (国小) | | 1948 |
| Hotaka Shrine | | Azumino | Myojin Taisha (名神) | Kokuhei Shōsha (国小) | Shinano Province third Shrine | 1948 |
| Nagano Gokoku Shrine | | Matsumoto, Nagano | － | Gokoku Shrine (護国) | | 1957 |
| Yohashira Shrine | | Matsumoto, Nagano | － | Village shrines (村社) | | 1959 |
| Fukashi Shrine | | Matsumoto, Nagano | | Prefectural Shrine (県社) | | 1966 |
| Tenaga Shrine | | Suwa, Nagano | | Prefectural Shrine (県社) | | 1968 |
| Takemizuwake Shrine | | Chikuma, Nagano | Myojin Taisha (名神) | Prefectural Shrine (県社) | Shinano Province | 1971 |
| Nyakuichi Ouji Shrine | | Ōmachi, Nagano | | Prefectural Shrine (県社) | | 1976 |
Gifu Prefecture
| Nangū Taisha | | Fuwa District, Gifu Tarui, Gifu | Myojin Taisha (名神) | Kokuhei Taisha (国大) | Mino Province Ichinomiya | 1948 |
| Minashi Shrine | | Takayama, Gifu | Shikinai Shosha | Kokuhei Shōsha (国小) | Hida Province Ichinomiya | 1948 |
| Inaba Shrine | | Gifu | | Kokuhei Shōsha (国小) | Mino Province third Shrine | 1948 |
| Gifu Gokoku Shrine | | Gifu | － | Gokoku Shrine (護国) | | |
| Sakurayama Hachimangu | | Takayama, Gifu | | Prefectural Shrine (県社) | | |
Shizuoka Prefecture
| Mishima Taisha | | Mishima, Shizuoka | Myojin Taisha (名神) | Kanpei-taisha (官大) | Izu Province Ichinomiya・総社 | 1948 |
| Fujisan Hongū Sengen Taisha | | Fujinomiya, Shizuoka | Myojin Taisha (名神) | Kanpei-taisha (官大) | Suruga Province Ichinomiya | 1948 |
| Iinoya-gū | | Hamamatsu Hamana-ku, Hamamatsu | － | Kanpei-chūsha (官中) | | 1948 |
| Oguni Jinja | | Shūchi District, Shizuoka Mori, Shizuoka | Shikinai Shosha | Kokuhei Shōsha (国小) | Tōtōmi Province Ichinomiya | 1948 |
| Shizuoka Sengen Shrine | | Shizuoka (city) Aoi-ku, Shizuoka | Shikinai Shosha | Kokuhei Shōsha (国小) | | 1948 |
| Izusan Jinja | | Atami | Shikinai Shosha | Kokuhei Shōsha (国小) | | 1948 |
| Kunōzan Tōshō-gū | | Suruga-ku, Shizuoka | － | Bekkaku kanpeisha (別官) | | 1948 |
| Akihasan Hongū Akiha Jinja | | Tenryū Ward | | Prefectural Shrine (県社) | | |
| Shirahama Shrine | | Shimoda, Shizuoka | Myojin Taisha (名神) | Prefectural Shrine (県社) | | |
| Shizuokaken Gokoku Shrine | | Aoi Ward, Shizuoka City | － | Gokoku Shrine (護国) | | |
| Yaizu Shrine | | Yaizu | | Prefectural Shrine (県社) | | |
| Oi Shrine | | Shimada, Shizuoka | | Prefectural Shrine (県社) | | 1966 |
| Gosha Suwa Shrine | | Chūō-ku, Hamamatsu | | Prefectural Shrine (県社) | | |
| Kinomiya Shrine | | Atami | | Village shrines (村社) | | |
| Fuji Rokusho Sengen Shrine | | Fuji, Shizuoka | Shikinai Shosha | District Shrine (郷社) | | |
Aichi Prefecture
| Atsuta Shrine | | Nagoya Atsuta-ku, Nagoya | Myojin Taisha (名神) | Kanpei-taisha (官大) | Owari Province third Shrine・Chokusaisha | 1948 |
| Masumida Shrine | | Ichinomiya, Aichi | Myojin Taisha (名神) | Kokuhei Chūsha (国中) | Owari Province Ichinomiya | 1948 |
| Ōagata Shrine | | Inuyama, Aichi | Myojin Taisha (名神) | Kokuhei Chūsha (国中) | Owari Province Ninomiya | 1948 |
| Toga Shrine | | Toyokawa, Aichi | Shikinai Shosha | Kokuhei Shōsha (国小) | Mikawa Province Ichinomiya | 1948 |
| Tsushima Shrine | | Tsushima, Aichi | | Kokuhei Shōsha (国小) | | 1948 |
| Owari Ōkunitama Shrine | | Inazawa | Shikinai Shosha | Kokuhei Shōsha (国小) | Owari Province Sōja (Shinto) | 1948 |
| Aichi Prefecture Gokoku Shrine | | Naka-ku, Nagoya | － | Gokoku Shrine (護国) | | |
| Wakamiya Hachiman Shrine | | Naka Ward, Nagoya City | | Prefectural Shrine (県社) | | 1971 |
| Chiryu Shrine | | Chiryū | Shikinai Shosha | Prefectural Shrine (県社) | Mikawa Province Ninomiya | |
Mie Prefecture
| Tado Shrine | | Kuwana, Mie | Myojin Taisha (名神) | Kokuhei Taisha (国大) | | 1948 |
| Aekuni Shrine | | Iga, Mie | Shikinai Taisha | Kokuhei Chūsha (国中) | Iga Province Ichinomiya | 1948 |
| Yūki Shrine | | Tsu, Mie | － | Bekkaku kanpeisha (別官) | | 1948 |
| Kitabatake Shrine | | Tsu, Mie | － | Bekkaku kanpeisha (別官) | | 1948 |
| Mie Prefecture Gokoku Shrine | | Tsu, Mie | － | Gokoku Shrine (護国) | | |
| Tsubaki Grand Shrine | | Suzuka, Mie | Shōsha Ronsha (小社論社) | Prefectural Shrine (県社) | Ise Province Ichinomiya | |
| Sarutahiko Shrine | | Ise, Mie | － | Unranked (無格) | | |
| Futami Okitama Shrine | | Ise, Mie | | Village shrines (村社) | | |
Shiga Prefecture
| Takebe taisha | | Ōtsu | Myojin Taisha (名神) | Kanpei-taisha (官大) | Ōmi Province Ichinomiya | 1948 |
| Taga-taisha | | Inukami District, Shiga Taga, Shiga | Shikinai Shosha | Kanpei-taisha (官大) | Omi Kuni Sannomiya | 1948 |
| Hiyoshi Taisha | | Ōtsu | Myojin Taisha (名神) | Kanpei-taisha (官大) | Twenty-Two Shrines・Ōmi Province Ninomiya | 1948 |
| Omi Shrine | | Ōtsu | － | Kanpei-taisha (官大) | Chokusaisha | 1948 |
| Mikami Shrine | | Yasu, Shiga | Myojin Taisha (名神) | Kanpei-chūsha (官中) | Omi Kuni Sannomiya | 1948 |
| Himure Hachiman-gū | | Ōmihachiman | | Prefectural Shrine (県社) | | 1966 |
| Aga Shrine | | Higashiōmi | | Village shrines (村社) | | |
| Shiga Prefecture Gokoku Shrine | | Hikone, Shiga | － | Gokoku Shrine (護国) | | |
| Nagahama Hachimangu | | Nagahama, Shiga | | Prefectural Shrine (県社) | | 2006 |
Kyoto Prefecture
| Kamigamo Shrine | | Kyoto Kita-ku, Kyoto | Myojin Taisha (名神) | Kanpei-taisha (官大) | Yamashiro Province Ichinomiya・Twenty-Two Shrines・Chokusaisha | 1948 |
| Shimogamo Shrine | | Sakyō-ku, Kyoto | Myojin Taisha (名神) | Kanpei-taisha (官大) | Yamashiro Province Ichinomiya・Twenty-Two Shrines・Chokusaisha | 1948 |
| Iwashimizu Hachimangū | | Yawata | Kokushi genzaisha | Kanpei-taisha (官大) | Twenty-Two Shrines・Chokusaisha | 1948 |
| Shiramine Jingū | | Kamigyō-ku | － | Kanpei-taisha (官大) | | 1948 |
| Matsunoo Taisha | | Nishikyō-ku, Kyoto | Myojin Taisha (名神) | Kanpei-taisha (官大) | Twenty-Two Shrines | 1948 |
| Hirano Shrine | | Kita Ward, Kyoto City, Kyoto Prefecture | Myojin Taisha (名神) | Kanpei-taisha (官大) | Twenty-Two Shrines | 1948 |
| Heian Shrine | | Sakyo Ward, Kyoto City, Kyoto Prefecture | － | Kanpei-taisha (官大) | Chokusaisha | 1948 |
| Yasaka Shrine | | Higashiyama-ku, Kyoto | | Kanpei-taisha (官大) | Twenty-Two Shrines | 1948 |
| Kifune Shrine | | Sakyo Ward, Kyoto City, Kyoto Prefecture | Myojin Taisha (名神) | Kanpei-chūsha (官中) | Twenty-Two Shrines | 1948 |
| Ōharano Shrine | | Nishikyo Ward, Kyoto City, Kyoto Prefecture | Kokushi genzaisha | Kanpei-chūsha (官中) | Twenty-Two Shrines | 1948 |
| Yoshida Shrine | | Sakyo Ward, Kyoto City, Kyoto Prefecture | | Kanpei-chūsha (官中) | Twenty-Two Shrines | 1948 |
| Kitano Tenmangū | | Kamigyo Ward, Kyoto City, Kyoto Prefecture | | Kanpei-chūsha (官中) | Twenty-Two Shrines | 1948 |
| Goō Shrine | | Kamigyo Ward, Kyoto City, Kyoto Prefecture | － | Bekkaku kanpeisha (別官) | | 1948 |
| Toyokuni Shrine (Kyoto) | | Higashiyama Ward, Kyoto City, Kyoto Prefecture | － | Bekkaku kanpeisha (別官) | | 1948 |
| Kono Shrine | | Miyazu, Kyoto | Myojin Taisha (名神) | Kokuhei Chūsha (国中) | Tango Province Ichinomiya | 1948 |
| Atago Shrine (Kyoto) | | Kyoto, Kyoto Prefecture Ukyō-ku, Kyoto | Shikinai Shosha | Metropolitan Shrine (府社) | | |
| Kyoto Ryozen Gokoku Shrine | | Higashiyama Ward, Kyoto City, Kyoto Prefecture | － | Gokoku Shrine (護国) | | |
Osaka Prefecture
| Sumiyoshi-taisha | | Sumiyoshi-ku, Osaka | Myojin Taisha (名神) | Kanpei-taisha (官大) | Settsu Province Ichinomiya・Twenty-Two Shrines | 1952 |
| Hiraoka Shrine | | Higashiōsaka | Myojin Taisha (名神) | Kanpei-taisha (官大) | Kawachi Province Ichinomiya | 1948 |
| Ōtori taisha | | Sakai Nishi-ku, Sakai | Myojin Taisha (名神) | Kanpei-taisha (官大) | Izumi Province Ichinomiya | 1948 |
| Ikukunitama Shrine | | Osaka Tennōji-ku, Osaka | Myojin Taisha (名神) | Kanpei-taisha (官大) | | 1948 |
| Minase Shrine | | Mishima District, Osaka Shimamoto, Osaka | － | Kanpei-taisha (官大) | | 1948 |
| Ikasuri Shrine | | Chūō-ku, Osaka | Shikinai Taisha | Kanpei-chūsha (官中) | Settsu Province Ichinomiya | 1948 |
| Abeno Shrine | | Abeno-ku, Osaka | － | Bekkaku kanpeisha (別官) | | 1948 |
| Shijōnawate Shrine | | Shijōnawate | － | Bekkaku kanpeisha (別官) | | 1948 |
| Osaka Tenmangū | | Kita-ku, Osaka | | Metropolitan Shrine (府社) | | |
| Kōzu-gū | | Chuo Ward, Osaka City, Osaka Prefecture | | Metropolitan Shrine (府社) | | |
| Imamiya Ebisu Shrine | | Naniwa-ku, Osaka | | District Shrine (郷社) | | |
| Osaka Gokoku Shrine | | Suminoe-ku, Osaka | － | Gokoku Shrine (護国) | | |
Hyōgo Prefecture
| Izanagi Shrine | | Awaji, Hyōgo | Myojin Taisha (名神) | Kanpei-taisha (官大) | Awaji Province Ichinomiya | 1948 |
| Hirota Shrine | | Nishinomiya | Myojin Taisha (名神) | Kanpei-taisha (官大) | Twenty-Two Shrines | 1948 |
| Ikuta Shrine | | Kobe Chūō-ku, Kobe | Myojin Taisha (名神) | Kanpei-chūsha (官中) | | 1948 |
| Nagata Shrine | | Nagata-ku, Kobe | Myojin Taisha (名神) | Kanpei-chūsha (官中) | | 1948 |
| Watatsumi jinja | | Tarumi-ku, Kobe | Myojin Taisha (名神) | Kanpei-chūsha (官中) | | 1948 |
| Minatogawa Shrine | | Chūō-ku, Kobe, Japan | － | Bekkaku kanpeisha (別官) | | 1948 |
| Izushi Shrine | | Toyooka, Hyōgo | Myojin Taisha (名神) | Kokuhei Chūsha (国中) | Tajima Province Ichinomiya | 1948 |
| Iwa Shrine | | Shisō, Hyōgo | Myojin Taisha (名神) | Kokuhei Chūsha (国中) | Harima Province Ichinomiya | 1948 |
| Nishinomiya Shrine | | Nishinomiya | | Prefectural Shrine (県社) | | |
| Itatehyōzu Shrine | | Himeji | Shikinai Shosha | Prefectural Shrine (県社) | Harima provincial shrine | |
| Hiromine Shrine | | Himeji | Kokushi genzaisha | Prefectural Shrine (県社) | | |
| Oishi Shrine | | Akō, Hyōgo | － | Prefectural Shrine (県社) | | |
| Tada Shrine | | Kawanishi, Hyōgo | － | Prefectural Shrine (県社) | | |
| Hyogo Himeji Gokoku Shrine | | Himeji | － | Gokoku Shrine (護国) | | |
| Hyogo Prefecture Kobe Gokoku Shrine | | Nada-ku, Kobe | － | Gokoku Shrine (護国) | | |
Nara Prefecture
| Kasuga-taisha | | Nara (city) | Myojin Taisha (名神) | Kanpei-taisha (官大) | Twenty-Two Shrines・Chokusaisha | 1948 |
| Ōmiwa Shrine | | Sakurai, Nara | Myojin Taisha (名神) | Kanpei-taisha (官大) | Yamato Province Ichinomiya・Twenty-Two Shrines | 1948 |
| Ōyamato Shrine | | Tenri, Nara | Myojin Taisha (名神) | Kanpei-taisha (官大) | Twenty-Two Shrines | 1948 |
| Isonokami Shrine | | Tenri, Nara | Myojin Taisha (名神) | Kanpei-taisha (官大) | Twenty-Two Shrines | 1948 |
| Hirose Shrine | | Kitakatsuragi District, Nara Kawai, Nara | Myojin Taisha (名神) | Kanpei-taisha (官大) | Twenty-Two Shrines | 1948 |
| Tatsuta Shrine | | Ikoma District, Nara Sangō, Nara | Myojin Taisha (名神) | Kanpei-taisha (官大) | Twenty-Two Shrines | 1948 |
| Niukawakami Jinjakamisha | | Yoshino District, Nara Kawakami, Nara | － | Kanpei-taisha (官大) | Twenty-Two Shrines | 1948 |
| Niukawakami Shrine | | Higashiyoshino, Nara | Myojin Taisha (名神) | Kanpei-taisha (官大) | Twenty-Two Shrines | 1948 |
| Niukawakami Jinja Shimosha | | Shimoichi, Nara | － | Kanpei-taisha (官大) | Twenty-Two Shrines | 1948 |
| Yoshino Shrine | | Yoshino, Nara | － | Kanpei-taisha (官大) | | 1948 |
| Kashihara Shrine | | Kashihara, Nara | － | Kanpei-taisha (官大) | Chokusaisha | 1948 |
| Tanzan Shrine | | Sakurai, Nara | － | Bekkaku kanpeisha (別官) | | 1948 |
| Isonozatakumushitama Shrine | | Yamatotakada, Nara | Shikinai Taisha | Prefectural Shrine (県社) | | 1966 |
| Nara Gokoku Shrine | | Nara (city) | － | Gokoku Shrine (護国) | | 1966 |
Wakayama Prefecture
| Niutsuhime Shrine | | Ito District, Wakayama Katsuragi, Wakayama | Myojin Taisha (名神) | Kanpei-taisha (官大) | Kii Province Ichinomiya | 1948 |
| Kamayama Shrine | | Wakayama (city) | Shikinai Shosha | Kanpei-taisha (官大) | | 1948 |
| Kumano Hongū Taisha | | Tanabe, Wakayama | Myojin Taisha (名神) | Kanpei-taisha (官大) | | 1948 |
| Kumano Hayatama Taisha | | Shingū, Wakayama | Shikinai Taisha | Kanpei-taisha (官大) | | 1948 |
| Kumano Nachi Taisha | | Higashimuro District, Wakayama Nachikatsuura | － | Kanpei-chūsha (官中) | | 1948 |
| Itakiso Shrine | | Wakayama (city) | Myojin Taisha (名神) | Kanpei-chūsha (官中) | Kinki Ichinomiya | 1948 |
| Tokei Shrine | | Tanabe, Wakayama | | Prefectural Shrine (県社) | | 1971 |
Tottori Prefecture
| Nawa Shrine | | Saihaku District, Tottori Daisen, Tottori | － | Bekkaku kanpeisha (別官) | | 1948 |
| Ube shrine | | Tottori (city) | Myojin Taisha (名神) | Kokuhei Chūsha (国中) | Inaba Province Ichinomiya | 1948 |
| Ōgamiyama Shrine | | Yonago | Shikinai Shosha | Kokuhei Shōsha (国小) | Hōki Province Ninomiya | 1948 |
| Shitori Shrine (Tottori) | | Tōhaku District Yurihama, Tottori | Shikinai Shosha | Kokuhei Shōsha (国小) | Hōki Province Ichinomiya | 1948 |
Shimane Prefecture
| Izumo-taisha | | Izumo, Shimane | Myojin Taisha (名神) | Kanpei-taisha (官大) | Izumo Province Ichinomiya・Chokusaisha | 1948 |
| Kumano Taisha | | Matsue | Myojin Taisha (名神) | Kokuhei Taisha (国大) | Izumo Province Ichinomiya | 1948 |
| Miho Shrine | | Matsue | Shikinai Shosha | Kokuhei Chūsha (国中) | | 1948 |
| Mizuwakasu Shrine | | Oki District, Shimane Okinoshima, Shimane | Myojin Taisha (名神) | Kokuhei Chūsha (国中) | Oki Province Ichinomiya | 1948 |
| Hinomisaki Shrine | | Izumo, Shimane | | Kokuhei Shōsha (国小) | | 1948 |
| Mononobe-jinja | | Ōda, Shimane | Shikinai Shosha | Kokuhei Shōsha (国小) | Iwami Province Ichinomiya | 1948 |
| Susa Shrine | | Izumo, Shimane | Shikinai Shosha | Kokuhei Shōsha (国小) | | 1948 |
| Sada Jinja | | Matsue | Shikinai Shosha | Kokuhei Shōsha (国小) | Izumo Province Ninomiya | 1948 |
| Hirahama Hachimangu | | Matsue | | Prefectural Shrine (県社) | | |
| Yaegaki Shrine | | Matsue | Shikinai Shosha | Prefectural Shrine (県社) | | 1981 |
| Taikodani Inari Shrine | | Kanoashi District, Shimane Tsuwano, Shimane | | District Shrine (郷社) | | |
| Matsue Gokoku Shrine | | Matsue | － | Gokoku Shrine (護国) | | |
| Hamada Gokoku Shrine | | Hamada, Shimane | － | Gokoku Shrine (護国) | | |
Okayama Prefecture
| Kibitsu Shrine | | Okayama Kita-ku, Okayama | Myojin Taisha (名神) | Kanpei-chūsha (官中) | Bitchū Province Ichinomiya | 1948 |
| Nakayama Shrine | | Tsuyama | Myojin Taisha (名神) | Kokuhei Chūsha (国中) | Mimasaka Province Ichinomiya | 1948 |
| Ani Shrine | | Higashi-ku, Okayama | Myojin Taisha (名神) | Kokuhei Chūsha (国中) | Bizen Province Ichinomiya | 1948 |
| Kibitsuhiko Shrine | | Okayama Kita-ku, Okayama | － | Kokuhei Shōsha (国小) | Bizen Province Ichinomiya | 1948 |
| Okayama Gokoku Shrine | | Naka-ku, Okayama | － | Gokoku Shrine (護国) | | |
Hiroshima Prefecture
| Itsukushima Shrine | | Hatsukaichi | Myojin Taisha (名神) | Kanpei-chūsha (官中) | Aki Province Ichinomiya | 1948 |
| Hayatani Shrine | | Hatsukaichi | Myojin Taisha (名神) | Kokuhei Chūsha (国中) | Aki Province Ninomiya | 1948 |
| Nunakuma Shrine | | Fukuyama, Hiroshima | Shikinai Shosha | Kokuhei Shōsha (国小) | | 1948 |
| Kibitsu jinja (Bingo) | | Fukuyama, Hiroshima | － | Kokuhei Shōsha (国小) | Bingo Province Ichinomiya | 1948 |
| Fukuyama Hachimangū | | Fukuyama, Hiroshima | | Prefectural Shrine (県社) | | |
| Kameyama Shrine | | Kure, Hiroshima | | Prefectural Shrine (県社) | | 1957 |
| Hijiyama Shrine | | Hiroshima Minami-ku, Hiroshima | | Village shrines (村社) | | 1959 |
| Bingo Gokoku Shrine | | Fukuyama, Hiroshima | － | Gokoku Shrine (護国) | | |
| Hiroshima Gokoku Shrine | | Naka-ku, Hiroshima | － | Gokoku Shrine (護国) | | |
Yamaguchi Prefecture
| Akama Shrine | | Shimonoseki | － | Kanpei-taisha (官大) | | 1948 |
| Sumiyoshi Shrine | | Shimonoseki | Myojin Taisha (名神) | Kanpei-chūsha (官中) | Nagato Province Ichinomiya | 1948 |
| Toyosaka Shrine | | Yamaguchi (city) | － | Bekkaku kanpeisha (別官) | | 1948 |
| Noda Shrine | | Yamaguchi (city) | － | Bekkaku kanpeisha (別官) | | 1948 |
| Tamanooya Shrine | | Hōfu | Shikinai Shosha | Kokuhei Chūsha (国中) | Suō Province Ichinomiya | 1948 |
| Iminomiya Shrine | | Shimonoseki | Shikinai Shosha | Kokuhei Shōsha (国小) | Nagato Province Ninomiya | 1948 |
| Hōfu Tenmangū | | Hōfu | | Prefectural Shrine (県社) | | |
| Kotozaki Hachimangu | | Ube, Yamaguchi | | Prefectural Shrine (県社) | | |
| Kameyama Hachimangū | | Shimonoseki | | Prefectural Shrine (県社) | Nagato Province third Shrine | |
| Yamaguchi Prefecture Gokoku Shrine | | Yamaguchi (city) | － | Gokoku Shrine (護国) | | |
Tokushima Prefecture
| Inbe Shrine | | Tokushima (city) | Myojin Taisha (名神) | Kokuhei Chūsha (国中) | | 1948 |
| Ōasahiko Shrine | | Naruto, Tokushima | Myojin Taisha (名神) | Kokuhei Chūsha (国中) | Awa Province (Tokushima) Ichinomiya | 1948 |
| Tsunomine Shrine | | Anan, Tokushima | | District Shrine (郷社) | | 1950 |
| Tokushima Gokoku Shrine | | Tokushima (city) | yam | Gokoku Shrine (護国) | | 2016 |
Kagawa Prefecture
| Tamura jinja | | Takamatsu | Myojin Taisha (名神) | Kokuhei Chūsha (国中) | Sanuki Province Ichinomiya | 1948 |
Ehime Prefecture
| Ōyamazumi Shrine | | Imabari, Ehime | Myojin Taisha (名神) | Kokuhei Taisha (国大) | Iyo Province Ichinomiya | 1952 |
| Isono Shrine | | Saijō, Ehime | Myojin Taisha (名神) | Kokuhei Chūsha (国中) | | 1948 |
| Ishizuchi Shrine | | Saijō, Ehime | | Prefectural Shrine (県社) | | |
| Warei Shrine | | Uwajima, Ehime | | Prefectural Shrine (県社) | | 1953 |
| Iyozu Hikomei Shrine | | Matsuyama | Myojin Taisha (名神) | Prefectural Shrine (県社) | | |
| Ehime Prefecture Gokoku Shrine | | Matsuyama | － | Gokoku Shrine (護国) | | |
Kōchi Prefecture
| Tosa jinja | | Kōchi (city) | Shikinai Taisha | Kokuhei Chūsha (国中) | Tosa Province Ichinomiya | 1948 |
| Ushioe Tenmangu shrine | | Kōchi (city) | | Prefectural Shrine (県社) | | |
| Kochi Gokoku Shrine | | Kōchi (city) | － | Gokoku Shrine (護国) | | |
Fukuoka Prefecture
| Kashii-gū | | Fukuoka Higashi-ku, Fukuoka | Kokushi genzaisha | Kanpei-taisha (官大) | Chokusaisha | 1948 |
| Munakata Taisha | | Munakata, Fukuoka | Myojin Taisha (名神) | Kanpei-taisha (官大) | | 1948 |
| Hakozaki Shrine | | Higashi-ku, Fukuoka | Myojin Taisha (名神) | Kanpei-taisha (官大) | Chikuzen Province Ichinomiya | 1948 |
| Kōra taisha | | Kurume | Myojin Taisha (名神) | Kokuhei Taisha (国大) | Chikugo Province Ichinomiya | 1951 |
| Hikosan Jingū | | Tagawa District, Fukuoka Soeda, Fukuoka | | Kanpei-chūsha (官中) | | 1948 |
| Dazaifu Tenmangū | | Dazaifu, Fukuoka | | Kanpei-chūsha (官中) | | 1948 |
| Kamado Shrine | | Dazaifu, Fukuoka | Myojin Taisha (名神) | Kanpei-shōsha (官小) | | 1948 |
| Sumiyoshi Shrine (Fukuoka) | | Hakata-ku, Fukuoka | Myojin Taisha (名神) | Kanpei-shōsha (官小) | Chikuzen Province Ichinomiya | 1948 |
| Shikaumi Shrine | | Higashi-ku, Fukuoka | Myojin Taisha (名神) | Kanpei-shōsha (官小) | | 1948 |
| Miyajidake Shrine | | Fukutsu, Fukuoka | | Prefectural Shrine (県社) | | |
| Kurume Suitengū | | Kurume City | | Prefectural Shrine (県社) | | |
| Kushida Shrine | | Hakata-ku, Fukuoka | | Prefectural Shrine (県社) | | |
| Furogu Shrine | | Ōkawa, Fukuoka | | Prefectural Shrine (県社) | | |
| Tobata Hachimangu | | Kitakyushu Tobata-ku, Kitakyūshū | | Prefectural Shrine (県社) | | |
| Kosou Hachimangu | | Moji-ku, Kitakyūshū | | Prefectural Shrine (県社) | | |
| Umi Hachiman-gū | | Kasuya District, Fukuoka Umi, Fukuoka | | Prefectural Shrine (県社) | | |
| Otomi Shrine | | Buzen, Fukuoka | | Prefectural Shrine (県社) | | |
| Terumo Shrine | | Chūō-ku, Fukuoka | | Prefectural Shrine (県社) | | |
| Noso Hachimangu | | Iizuka, Fukuoka | | Prefectural Shrine (県社) | | |
| Washio Atago Shrine | | Nishi-ku, Fukuoka | | District Shrine (郷社) | | |
| Wakamatsu Ebisu Shrine | | Wakamatsu-ku, Kitakyūshū | | Village shrines (村社) | | |
| Fukuoka Prefecture Gokoku Shrine | | Chūō-ku, Fukuoka | － | Gokoku Shrine (護国) | | |
| Tokaebisu Shrine | | Hakata Ward, Fukuoka City | | | | |
Saga Prefecture
| Saga Shrine | | Saga (city) | － | Bekkaku kanpeisha (別官) | | 1948 |
| Tashima Shrine | | Karatsu, Saga | Myojin Taisha (名神) | Kokuhei Chūsha (国中) | | 1948 |
| Chiriku Hachiman Shrine | | Miyaki District, Saga Miyaki, Saga | | Kokuhei Shōsha (国小) | Hizen Province Ichinomiya | 1948 |
| Yūtoku Inari Shrine | | Kashima, Saga | － | Prefectural Shrine (県社) | | |
| Saga Gokoku Shrine | | Saga (city) | － | Gokoku Shrine (護国) | | |
Nagasaki Prefecture
| Sumiyoshi Shrine (Iki City) | | Iki, Nagasaki | Myojin Taisha (名神) | Kokuhei Chūsha (国中) | | 1948 |
| Kaijin Shrine | | Tsushima, Nagasaki | Myojin Taisha (名神) | Kokuhei Chūsha (国中) | Tsushima Province Ichinomiya | 1948 |
| Suwa Shrine (Nagasaki) | | Nagasaki | － | Kokuhei Chūsha (国中) | | 1948 |
| Kameyama Hachimangu Shrine | | Sasebo | | Prefectural Shrine (県社) | | |
| Nagasaki Gokoku Shrine | | Nagasaki | － | Gokoku Shrine (護国) | | |
Kumamoto Prefecture
| Aso Shrine | | Aso, Kumamoto | Myojin Taisha (名神) | Kanpei-taisha (官大) | Higo Province Ichinomiya | 1948 |
| Yatsushiro-gū | | Yatsushiro | － | Kanpei-chūsha (官中) | | 1948 |
| Kikuchi Shrine | | Kikuchi, Kumamoto | － | Bekkaku kanpeisha (別官) | | 1948 |
| Fujisaki Hachimangū | | Kumamoto | | Kokuhei Shōsha (国小) | | 1948 |
| Aoi Aso Shrine | | Hitoyoshi, Kumamoto | | Prefectural Shrine (県社) | | |
| Kumamoto Gokoku Shrine | | Kumamoto | － | | Equivalent to Gokoku Shrine | 1959 |
| Takahashi Inari Shrine | | Kumamoto | － | Unranked (無格) | | |
Ōita Prefecture
| Usa Jingū | | Usa, Ōita | Myojin Taisha (名神) | Kanpei-taisha (官大) | Buzen Province Ichinomiya・Chokusaisha | 1948 |
| Sasamuta-jinja | | Ōita (city) | Shikinai Taisha | Kokuhei Chūsha (国中) | Bungo Province Ichinomiya | 1948 |
| Yusuhara Hachimangū | | Ōita (city) | | Kokuhei Shōsha (国小) | Bungo Province Ichinomiya | 1948 |
| Hachiman Asami Shrine | | Beppu | | Prefectural Shrine (県社) | | |
| Kasuga Shrine | | Ōita (city) | | Prefectural Shrine (県社) | | |
| Oita Gokoku Shrine | | Ōita (city) | － | Gokoku Shrine (護国) | | |
Miyazaki Prefecture
| Miyazaki-jingū | | Miyazaki (city) | | Kanpei-taisha (官大) | | 1948 |
| Udo-jingū | | Nichinan, Miyazaki | | Kanpei-taisha (官大) | | 1948 |
| Tsuno Shrine | | Koyu District, Miyazaki Tsuno, Miyazaki | Shikinai Shosha | Kokuhei Shōsha (国小) | Hyūga Province Ichinomiya | 1948 |
| Kanhashira-gū | | Miyakonojō | | Prefectural Shrine (県社) | | |
| Sano Shrine | | Nishimorokata District, Miyazaki Takaharu, Miyazaki | | Prefectural Shrine (県社) | | |
| Aoshima Shrine | | Miyazaki (city) | | Village shrines (村社) | | |
| Takachiho Shrine | | Nishiusuki District, Miyazaki Takachiho, Miyazaki | Kokushi genzaisha Ronsha | Village shrines (村社) | | 1971 |
| Amanoiwato Shrine | | Takachiho Town, Nishiusuki District | | Village shrines (村社) | | |
| Miyazaki Gokoku Shrine | | Miyazaki (city) | | | Equivalent to Gokoku Shrine | |
Kagoshima Prefecture
| Kirishima-Jingū | | Kirishima, Kagoshima | Shōsha Ronsha (小社論社) | Kanpei-taisha (官大) | | 1948 |
| Kagoshima Shrine | | Kirishima, Kagoshima | Shikinai Taisha | Kanpei-taisha (官大) | Ōsumi Province Ichinomiya | 1948 |
| Terukuni jinja | | Kagoshima | － | Bekkaku kanpeisha (別官) | | 1948 |
| Nitta Shrine | | Satsumasendai, Kagoshima | | Kokuhei Chūsha (国中) | Satsuma Province Ichinomiya | 1948 |
| Hirasaki Shrine | | Ibusuki, Kagoshima | Shikinai Shosha | Kokuhei Shōsha (国小) | Satsuma Province Ichinomiya | 1948 |
| Kagoshima Prefecture Gokoku Shrine | | Kagoshima | － | Gokoku Shrine (護国) | | |
Okinawa Prefecture
| Naminoue Shrine | | Naha | | Kanpei-shōsha (官小) | Ryukyu Kingdom Ichinomiya | 1948 |

== Non-Beppyō shrines ==
The following shrines are not Beppyō shrines because they do not have a comprehensive relationship with the Association of Shinto Shrines. Those whose "Year of termination of umbrella relationship" is 1946 are those that have not been in umbrella relationship with the Association of Shinto Shrines since its establishment in 1946.

| name | Settlement | In the formula | Modern system of ranked Shinto Shrines | Other shrines | Year of elimination of inclusive relationship |
|---|---|---|---|---|---|
| Fushimi Inari-taisha | Kyoto Prefecture Kyoto Fushimi-ku, Kyoto | Myojin Taisha (名神) | Kanpei-taisha (官大) | Twenty-Two Shrines | 1946 |
| Hinokuma Shrine | Wakayama Prefecture Wakayama (city) | Myojin Taisha (名神) | Kanpei-taisha (官大) | Kii Province Ichinomiya | 1946 |
| Umenomiya Shrine | Ukyō-ku, Kyoto | Myojin Taisha (名神) | Kanpei-chūsha (官中) | Twenty-Two Shrines | 1946 |
| Kamakura-gū | Kanagawa Prefecture Kamakura | － | Kanpei-chūsha (官中) | | |
| Yasukuni Shrine | Chiyoda, Tokyo | － | Bekkaku kanpeisha (別官) | Chokusaisha | 1946 |
| Yamauchi Shrine | Kōchi Prefecture Kōchi (city) | － | Bekkaku kanpeisha (別官) | | |
| Nikkō Tōshō-gū | Nikkō | － | Bekkaku kanpeisha (別官) | | 1985 |
| Nashinoki Shrine | Kamigyō-ku | － | Bekkaku kanpeisha (別官) | | 2013 |
| Keta Taisha | Ishikawa Prefecture Hakui, Ishikawa | Myojin Taisha (名神) | Kokuhei Taisha (国大) | Noto Province Ichinomiya | 2005 (Note: The year when it was resolved to change the rules of the shrine to withdraw from the Association of Shinto Shrines. Disputed over withdrawal, confirmed by 2010 Supreme Court decision) |
| Izumo-daijingū | Kameoka, Kyoto | Myojin Taisha (名神) | Kokuhei Chūsha (国中) | Tanba Province Ichinomiya | 1946 |
| Kenkun Shrine | Kita Ward, Kyoto City, Kyoto Prefecture | － | Bekkaku kanpeisha (別官) | | 2019 |
| Kotohira-gū | Nakatado District, Kagawa Kotohira, Kagawa | － | Kokuhei Chūsha (国中) | | 2020 |

== See also ==
- Modern system of ranked Shinto shrines
- List of Shinto shrines in Japan
