= Engishiki =

Japanese book about laws and customs

The Engishiki (延喜式; "Procedures of the Engi Era") is a Japanese book of laws and customs. The major part of the writing was completed in 927.

== History ==
Emperor Daigo ordered the compilation of the Engishiki in 905. Although previous attempts at codification are known to have taken place, neither the Konin nor the Jogan Gishiki survive, making the Engishiki important for early Japanese historical and religious studies.

Fujiwara no Tokihira began the task, but work stalled when he died four years later in 909. His brother Fujiwara no Tadahira continued the work in 912 eventually completing it in 927.

While the Engishiki was presented to the throne in 927, it was not used as a basis for enacting policy until 967. Possible reasons for this delay in application include a need for it to be revised, the fact that it was simply a record of already existing systems, and also that some of those systems functioned in name only.

== Contents ==
The text is 50 volumes in lengths and is organized by department: it comprises in total approximately 3,100 articles, of which the regulations concerning the Department of Worship account for roughly a third of the entire compendium.

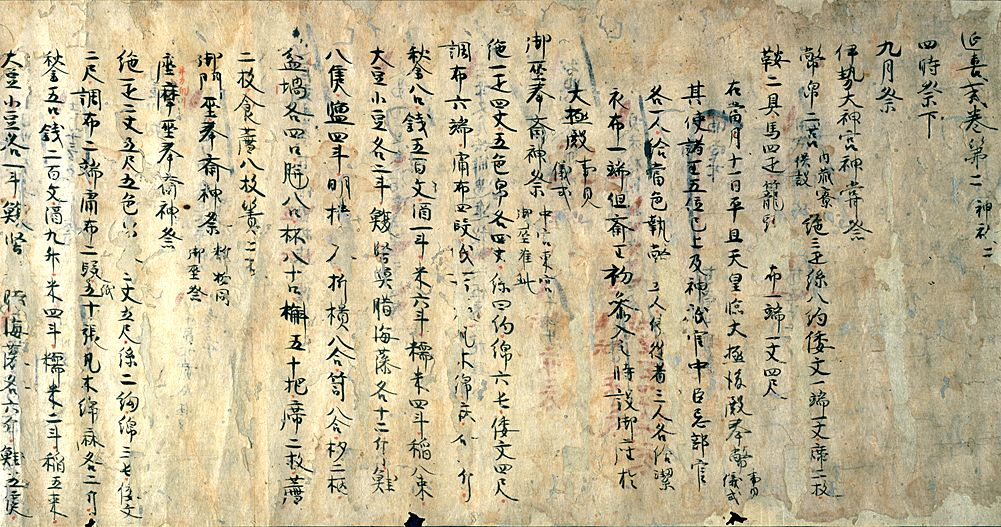
Rules and regulations concerning ceremonies and other events (延喜式, Engishiki), Kujō edition.

- volumes 1–10: Department of Worship: In addition to regulating ceremonials including Daijōsai (the first Niiname-sai following the accession of a new emperor) and worship at Ise Grand Shrine and Saikū, this section of the Engishiki recorded liturgical texts and 2,861 officially recognized Shinto shrines as well as 3,131 officially-recognized kami.
- volumes 11–40: Department of State and Eight Ministries
- volumes 41–49: Other departments
- volume 50: Miscellaneous laws

== Engishiki Jinmyōchō ==
The Engishiki Jinmyōchō is the part of the Engishiki where the main shrines and kami of Japan are listed. Shrines listed in the Engishiki are referred to collectively as shikinaisha (式内社; "in Engishiki shrines") while shrines that existed at the time but were not included are called shikigesha (式外社; "out of Engishiki shrines").

There are 2,861 shrines and 3,132 kami listed in the Engishiki, divided into four categories based on whether they were imperially or nationally run, and major or minor:

- Major imperial shrine (官幣大社, kanpei taisha) - 198 shrines and 304 kami
- Minor imperial shrine (官幣小社, kanpei shōsha) - 375 in total and 433 kami
- Major national shrine (国幣大社, kokuhei taisha) - 155 in total and 188 kami
- Minor national shrine (国幣小社, kokuhei shōsha) - 2,133 in total and 2,207 kami

In addition to listing officially recognized shrines and kami, the Jinmyōchō notes 285 kami of those officially recognized as having the title of myōjin (名神) due to their particularly noteworthy power.

== Shrine lists ==
These are non-exhaustive lists of shrines of the given categories defined by the Engishiki

=== List of Myojin Taisha ===
- Aso Shrine
- Atsuta Shrine
- Awa Shrine
- Awaga Shrine
- Chōkaisan Ōmonoimi Shrine
- Dewa Shrine
- Fujisan Hongū Sengen Taisha
- Fushimi Inari-taisha
- Futarasan shrine
- Gassan Shrine
- Hakozaki Shrine
- Hikawa Shrine (Saitama)
- Hinokuma Shrine
- Hirano Shrine
- Hiraoka Shrine
- Hirose Taisha
- Hirota Shrine
- Hiyoshi Taisha
- Hotaka Shrine
- Ichinomiya Asama Shrine (Fuefuki)
- Ichinomiya Sengen Shrine
- Ichinomiya Shrine (Tokushima)
- Ikonohime no Mikoto Shrine
- Ikukunitama Shrine
- Ikushimatarushima Shrine
- Ikuta Shrine
- Imizu Shrine
- Inbe Shrine
- Isasumi Shrine
- Isono Shrine
- Isonokami Shrine
- Itakiso shrine
- Itsukushima Shrine
- Iwa Shrine
- Izanagi Shrine
- Izumo-daijingū
- Izumo-taisha
- Izushi Shrine
- Iyozu Hikomei Shrine
- Kaijin Shrine
- Kamado Shrine
- Kamigamo Shrine
- Kanasana Shrine
- Kashima Shrine
- Kasuga-taisha
- Katori Shrine
- Kehi Shrine
- Keta Jinja
- Keta Taisha
- Kibitsu Shrine (Bitchū)
- Kibitsuhiko Shrine
- Kifune Shrine
- Kinpu Shrine (Yoshino)
- Kono Shrine
- Kōra taisha
- Kumano Hongū Taisha
- Kumano Taisha
- Masumida Shrine
- Matsunoo Taisha
- Mikami Shrine
- Mishima Taisha
- Munakata Taisha
- Nagata Shrine
- Nakayama Shrine
- Nangū Taisha
- Niukawakami Shrine
- Niutsuhime Shrine
- Nukisaki Shrine
- Ōasahiko Shrine
- Oarai Shrine
- Oarai Isosaki Shrine
- Ōmiwa Shrine
- Ōmiwa Shrine, Ichinomiya
- Onji Shrine
- Ōtori taisha
- Ōyamato Shrine
- Ōyamazumi Shrine
- Sakatsura Isosaki Shrine
- Samukawa Shrine
- Shikaumi Shrine
- Shimogamo Shrine
- Sumiyoshi Shrine (Fukuoka)
- Sumiyoshi Shrine (Shimonoseki)
- Sumiyoshi-taisha
- Suwa-taisha
- Sumiyoshi Shrine (Iki City)
- Takemizuwake Shrine
- Tagata Shrine
- Take Shrine
- Tashima Shrine
- Tado Taisha
- Takebe taisha
- Tamasaki Shrine
- Tamura Shrine
- Tatsuta Taisha
- Three Mountains of Dewa
- Tsukiyomi Shrine (Kyoto)
- Tsukubasan Shrine
- Tsutsukowake Shrine
- Ube Shrine
- Umenomiya Taisha
- Usa Jingū
- Utsunomiya Futarayama Shrine
- Wakasahiko Shrine
- Watatsumi Shrine
- Yahiko Shrine
- Yamato Okunitama Shrine

=== List of Shikinai Taisha ===
- Aekuni Shrine
- Ikasuri Shrine
- Ikoma Shrine
- Isonozatakumushitama Shrine
- Izawa-jinja
- Izawa-no-miya
- Kagoshima Shrine
- Kumano Hayatama Taisha
- Sasamuta Shrine
- Shikiagatanushi Shrine
- Susaki Shrine
- Tosa Shrine
- Uda Mikumari Shrine
- Yoshino Mikumari Shrine

=== List of Shikinai Shosha ===
- Atago Shrine
- Chichibu Shrine
- Chiryu Shrine
- Dewa Shrine
- Fuji Rokusho Sengen Shrine
- Hirasaki Shrine
- Iminomiya Shrine
- Itatehyōzu Shrine
- Izusan Shrine
- Kamayama Shrine
- Komagata Shrine
- Miho Shrine
- Minashi Shrine
- Mononobe Shrine
- Nunakuma Shrine
- Ōgamiyama Shrine
- Oguni shrine
- Onominato Shrine
- Owari Ōkunitama Shrine
- Oyama Aburi Shrine
- Oyama Shrine
- Sada Shrine
- Shirayama Hime Shrine
- Shitori Shrine
- Shizuoka Sengen Shrine
- Sugo Ishibe Shrine
- Susa Shrine
- Taga-taisha
- Takase Shrine
- Tamanooya Shrine
- Toga Shrine
- Tsukubasan Shrine
- Tsurugi Shrine
- Tsuno Shrine
- Watatsu Shrine
- Yaegaki Shrine

== See also ==
- Japanese Historical Text Initiative
- Ruijū Kokushi, a categorized and chronological history text of the Six National Histories
- Historiography of Japan
- Beppyo shrine
- Ichinomiya
- Kanpei-taisha
- Taisha
