= Aichi Gokoku Shrine =

Shinto shrine in Nagoya, Japan

Aichi Prefecture Gokoku Shrine (愛知縣護國神社)
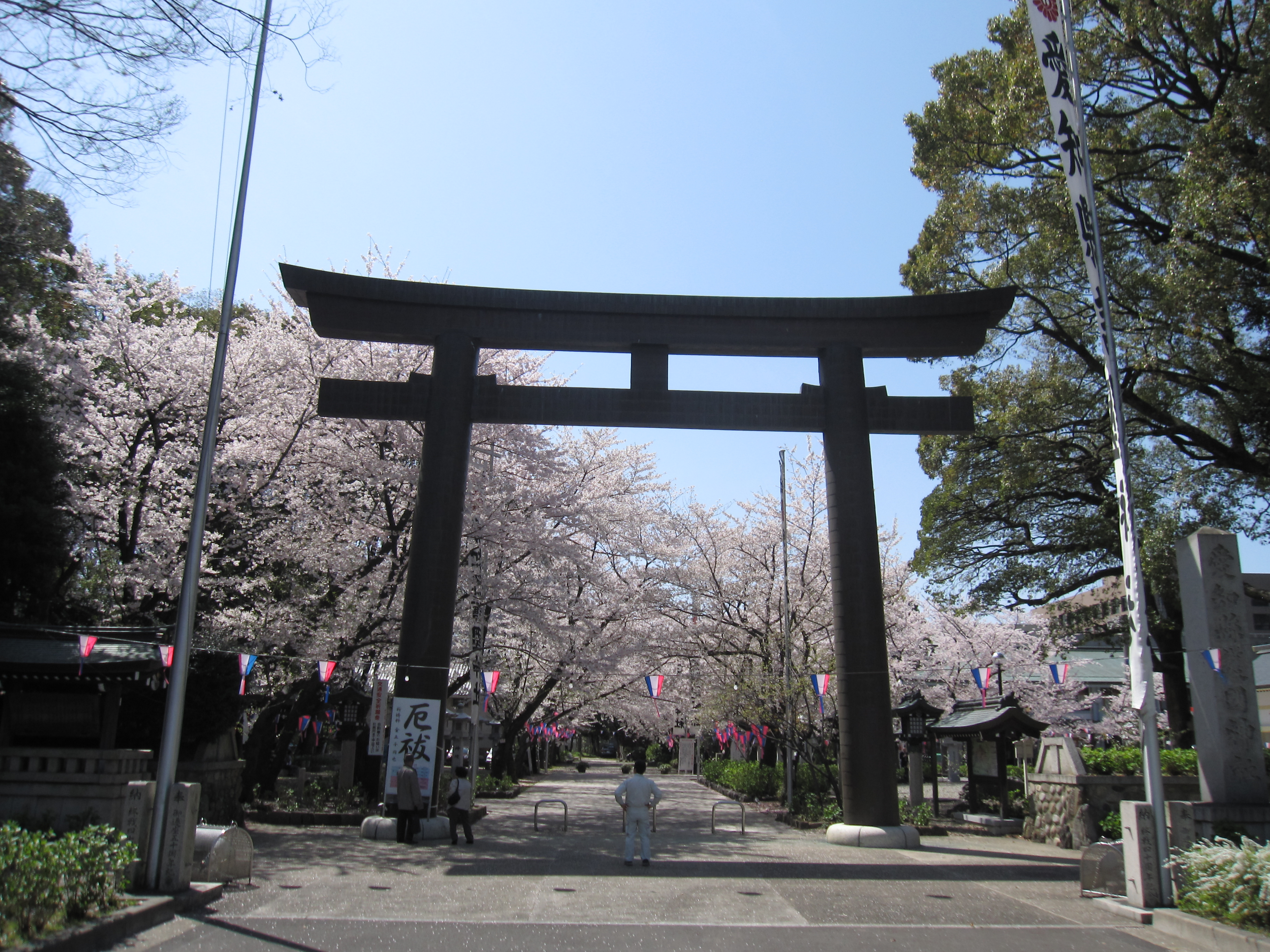
- Main gate of the Aichi Prefecture Gokoku Shrine

- Location within Japan

Religion
- Affiliation: Shinto

Location
- Location: Nagoya Castle, in central Nagoya, Japan
- Interactive map of Aichi Prefecture Gokoku Shrine (愛知縣護國神社)
- Coordinates: 35°10′46″N 136°53′59″E

The Aichi Prefecture Gokoku Shrine is a Shinto shrine located in the Sannomaru compound, next to Nagoya Castle, in central Nagoya, Japan.
