= Susa Shrine =

Shinto Shrine

- 須佐神社
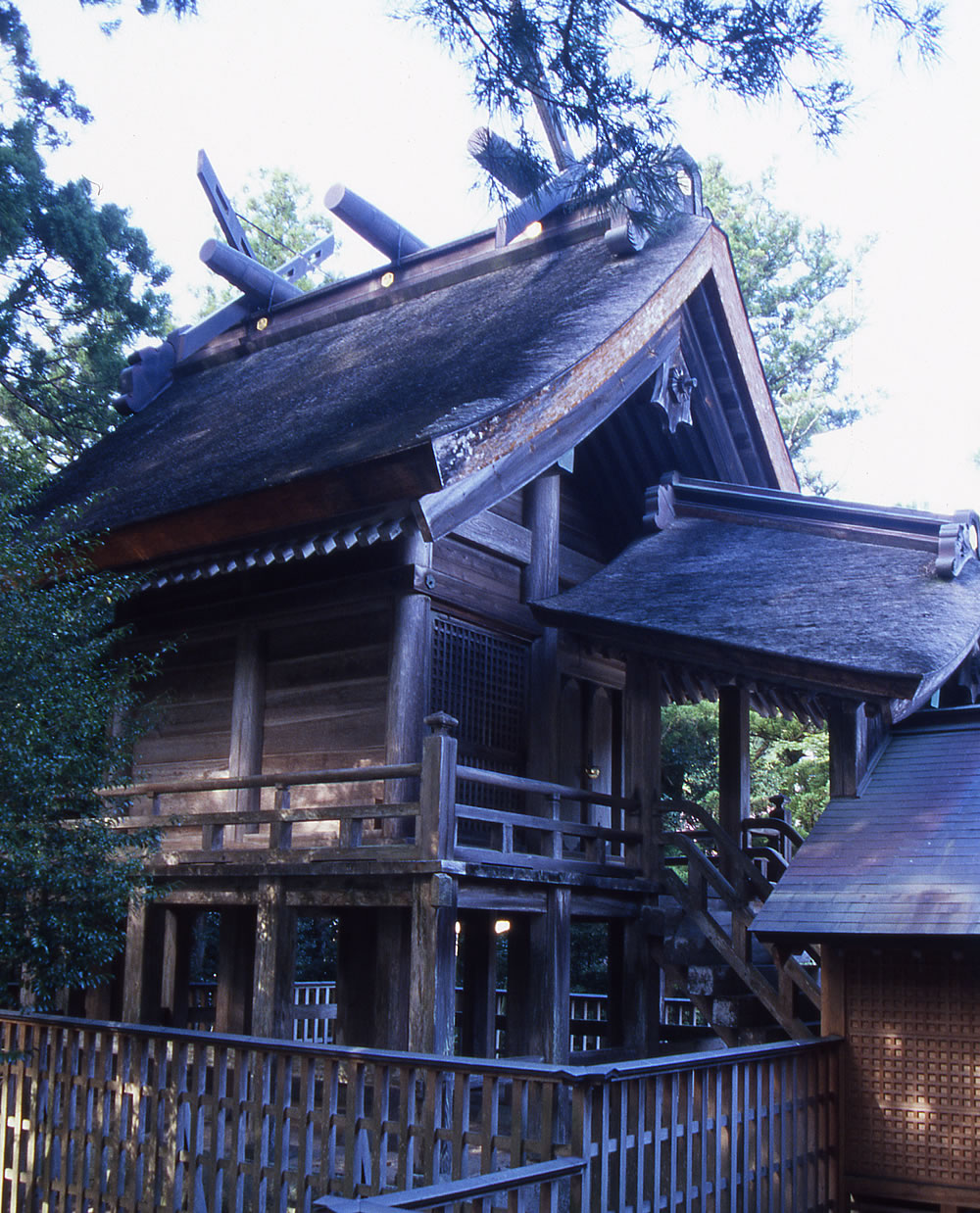

Religion
- Affiliation: Shinto
- Deity: Susanoo-no-Mikoto Kushinadahime Ashinazuchi and Tenazuchi
- Festival: April 18

Location
- Location: 730 Susa, Sada-cho, Izumo City, Shimane Prefecture
- Municipality: Izumo, Shimane
- Interactive map of Susa Shrine
- Coordinates: 35°14′04.8″N 132°44′13.0″E

Architecture
- Type: Taisha-zukuri
- Established: 776

Website
- https://www.susa-jinja.jp/

Susa Shrine (須佐神社, Susa Jinja) is a Shinto shrine in Izumo, Shimane, Japan. It is the 18th Shinto shrine in the Enza-no-kai Organization list of shrines and temples considered important to the historical region of Izumo, which includes other major shrines in Shimane and Tottori Prefectures including Izumo-taisha, Kumano-taisha, and Ōgamiyama Jinja.

The main deity is Susanoo-no-Mikoto, and his wife, Inada-hime, and Inada-hime's parents, Ashimazuchi-no-mikoto and Temazuchi-no-mikoto, are also enshrined. (Note: It is said that the three deities were enshrined at the shrine site on the opposite side of the Susa River (currently on the grounds of Yukari-kan) until the Tenbun period.)

The shrine is listed in the Izumo Fudoki as one of five shrines in Iishi District that were registered with the Department of Divinities. This shrine is identified as the place in what was formerly the township of Susa where Susanoo chose to enshrine his spirit. The shrine was also known as Jūsansho Daimyōjin (十三所大明神) and Susa no Ōmiya (須佐大宮 'Great Shrine of Susa') during the medieval and early modern periods. The shrine's priestly lineage, the Susa (or Inada) clan (須佐氏 / 稲田氏), were considered to be the descendants of Susanoo via his son Yashimashino-no-Mikoto (八島篠命, the Kojiki's Yashimajinumi-no-Kami) or Ōkuninushi. Besides Susanoo, his consort Kushinadahime and her parents Ashinazuchi and Tenazuchi are also enshrined here as auxiliary deities.

== History ==
The shrine was founded in 776

The priests of the shrine are said to be descendants of Ōkuninushi.

It is mentioned in the Engishiki.

== Description ==
Susa-jinja is built in the taisha-zukuri style and, in addition to the honden, hosts a number of smaller shrines. Susa-jinja also claims to have "Seven Wonders" littered across its grounds including a 1300-year-old sacred tree, a cherry tree that casts no shadow, and a saltwater well.
