= Furogu Shrine =

Shinto shrine

- 風浪宮 (fuuro-gu)
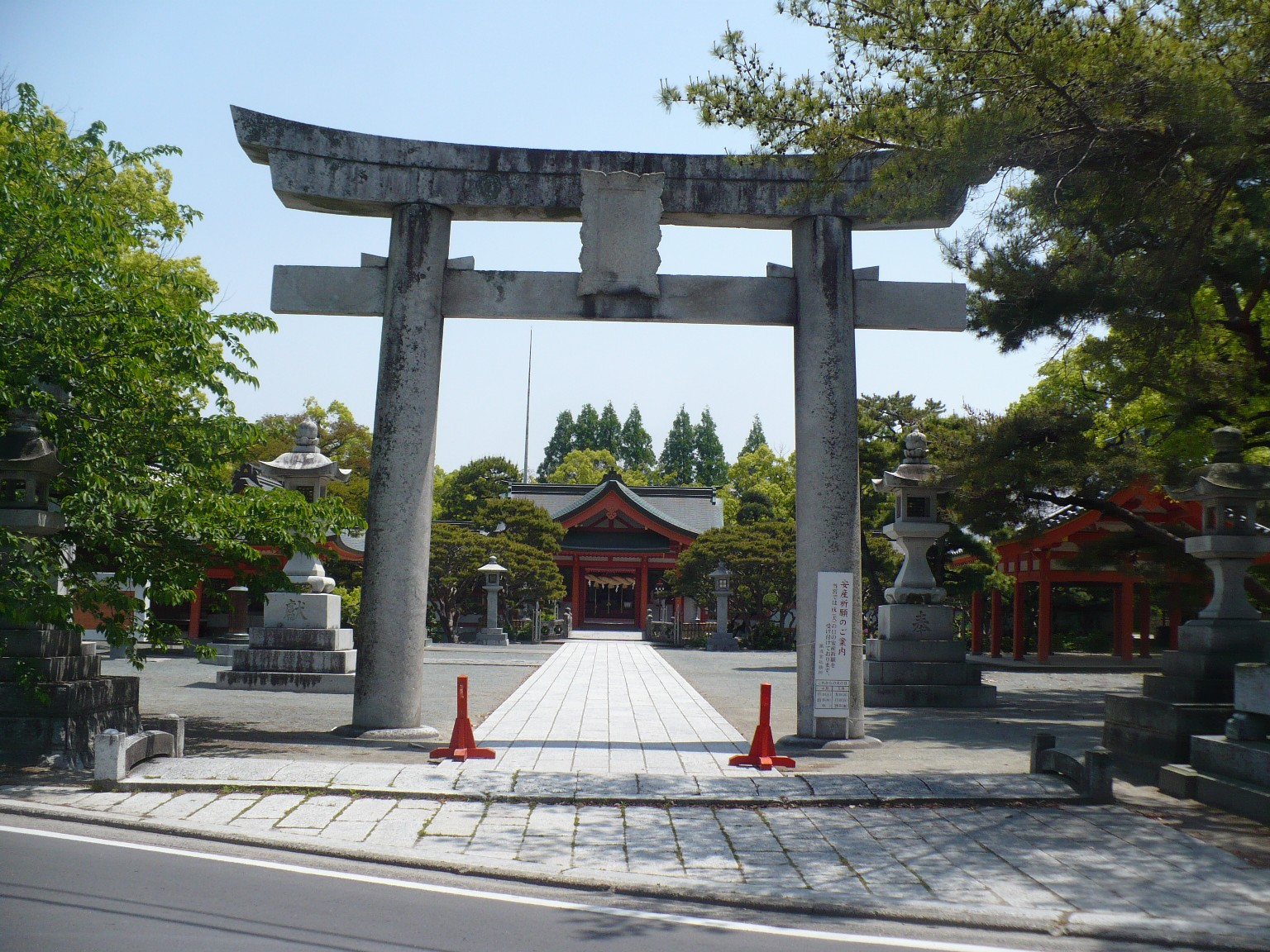
- View from in front of Torii Gate

Religion
- Affiliation: Shinto
- Deity: Watatsumi, Empress Jingū, Sumiyoshi sanjin

Location
- Interactive map of Furogu Shrine

The Furogu Shrine (Japanese: 風浪宮, romanized: Palace of Wind and Waves is a shrine located in Okawa, Fukuoka Prefecture. It is a central shrine of the city. It has been traditionally served by the Azumi people.

== Overview ==
The origins of the shrine date back 1800 years and it is linked to Empress Jingū. The current shrine was built in 1560.

Twenty-two Watatsumi shrines in the region claim to have been founded by her after her campaign, including Watatsumi Shrine.

The shrine is locally known as Ofurosan.

Furogu Shrine's Reitaisai happens in early February. It is a major festival in Chikugo Province. It is one of three big festivals, with the others at Kora Shrine and Suitengu Shrine in Kurume. The festival is also known as "Ofurosan." It draws over 150,000 visitors. The festival is known for its exciting events. During the festival people carry matsuri floats and chant. The shioi pilgrimage and goshinko processions are highlights. Another popular attraction is yabusame, horseback archery. Around 300 stalls are set up near the shrine. They sell festival food. This includes dried persimmons and other items.

The shrine has a massive shinboku or divine tree, a camphor tree, on its premises. The tree itself is 1800 years old.

The current main shrine was rebuilt by Kamakura no Yoritomo, the lord of Yanagawa Castle during the Sengoku period, and the main shrine and stone five-story pagoda have been designated as Important Cultural Properties by the national government.

It has a seated wooden figure of the Buddhist deity Guanyin and a dramatic standing statue of Watatsumi as Ryūjin.

== Cultural properties ==
=== Important Cultural Property (National Designation) ===
Honden - Built in the late Muromachi period (1560).

- Main shrine - Built in the late Muromachi period (1560).
- Stone five-story pagoda - early Muromachi period (1355). Designated on May 27, 1907.

It is inscribed with the date of the 10th month of the 10th year of the Shohei Era. Designated on August 29, 1910.

== See also ==
- Watatsumi Shrine
