= Tsukubasan Shrine =

Shrine in Ibaraki Prefecture, Japan

Tsukubasan Shrine 筑波山神社 (Tsukubasan Jinja)
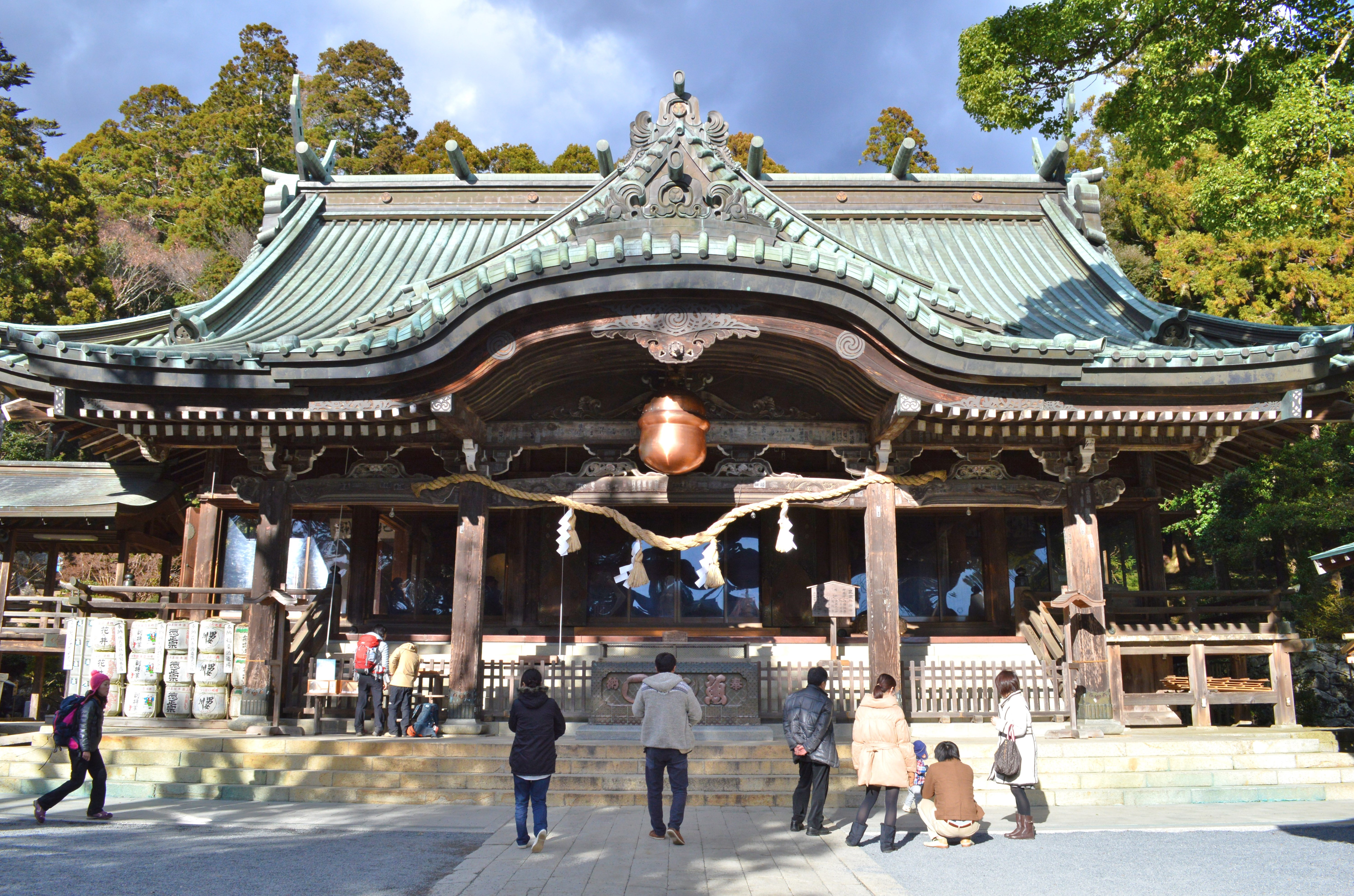
- Worship hall haiden

- Location within Japan

Religion
- Affiliation: Shinto
- Deity: Izanagi (伊弉諾尊) and Izanami (伊弉冊尊)
- Festivals: April 1, Ozagawari, November 1 (Ozagawari)
- Type: Beppyo shrine

Location
- Location: Tsukuba 1, Tsukuba, Ibaraki Prefecture, JAPAN, 300-4352
- Coordinates: 36°12′49.25″N 140°6′4.72″E

Website
- www.tsukubasanjinja.jp

Tsukubasan Shrine (筑波山神社, Tsukubasan jinja) is a Shinto shrine located in Tsukuba, Ibaraki Prefecture, Japan. It enshrines the kami Izanagi (伊弉諾尊) and Izanami (伊弉冊尊). The shrine is located on Mount Tsukuba, close to the station for the Mount Tsukuba Cable Car, a funicular railway that leads up towards the summit of Mount Tsukuba. The shrine is designated by the Association of Shinto Shrines as a Beppyo shrine (別表神社), a shrine with special characteristics.

Tsukubasan shrine is dedicated to the gods of family safety, harmony within marriage, and matchmaking.

== Introduction ==
Tsukubasan shrine is located on the slopes and summit of Mt. Tsukuba. The main shrines are located on the twin summits of Mt. Tsukuba, while the hall of worship and other precincts are lower down the mountain, close to the cable car station. In addition to the main shrine, there are four auxiliary shrines or sessha (摂社). The auxiliary shrines lie along the Shirakumo Bridge trail up to the summit of Mt. Tsukuba and enshrine the child gods of Izanagi and Izanabaku. There are also said to be at least 100 subordinate shrines.

== Enshrined deities ==
The gods Izanagi (伊弉諾尊) and Izanami (伊弉冊尊) are enshrined.

== History ==
There is no official date for the establishment of the shrine.

== Ozagawari Festivals ==
The main festivals of the shrine take place on the 1st of April and the 1st of November. On the 1st April an omikoshi holding a child god is escorted up the mountain. In November, the procession is reversed.

== See also ==
- List of Shinto shrines in Japan
