= Nakayama Shrine =

Shintō shrine in Tsuyama, Japan

Nakayama Shrine 中山神社
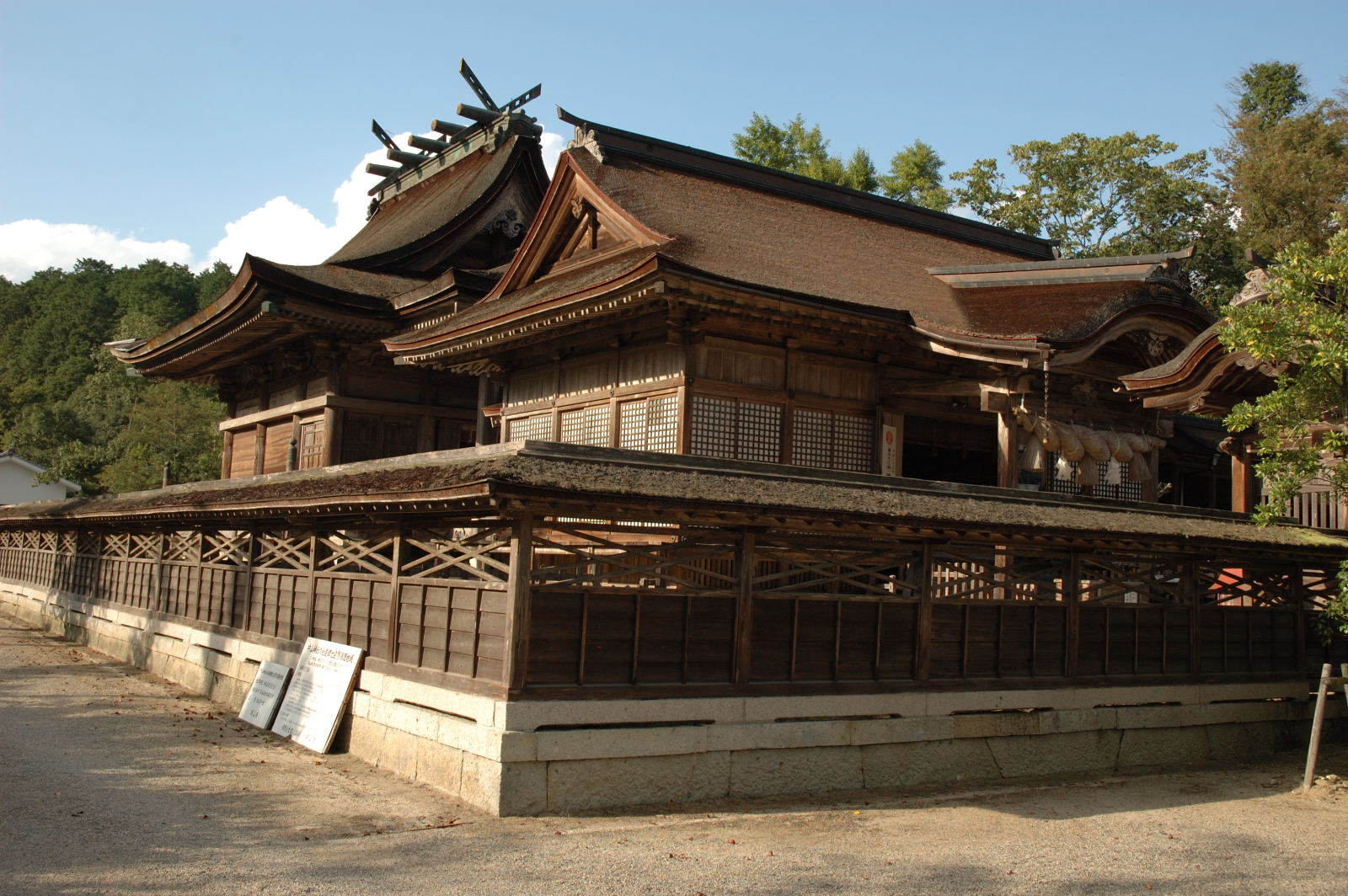
- Haiden and Honden of Nakayama Shrine

- Nakayama Shrine Nakayama Shrine (Japan)

Religion
- Affiliation: Shinto
- Deity: Kagamitsukuri-no-kami
- Festival: April 29

Location
- Location: 695 Ichinomiya, Tsuyama-shi, Okayama-ken 708-0815
- Interactive map of Nakayama Shrine 中山神社
- Coordinates: 35°06′0.78″N 133°59′40.53″E

Nakayama Jinja (中山神社) is a Shinto shrine in the Ichinomiya neighborhood of the city of Tsuyama in Okayama Prefecture, Japan. It is the ichinomiya of former Mimasaka Province. The main festival of the shrine is held annually on April 29. Although the kanji of the shrine's name is now pronounced "Nakayama", in the past the shrine was often referred to by its alternative pronunciation "Chuzen Jinja" or "Chuzen Dai-Gongen".

== Enshrined kami ==
The kami enshrined at Nakayama Jinja are:

- Kagamitsukuri-no-kami (鏡作神), god of mirrors
- Ame-no-Nukado-no-kami (天糠戸神)
- Ishikori-dome no Mikoto (石凝姥命), goddess of mirrors and metal casting

== History ==
The origins of Nakayama Jinja are uncertain. According to the shrine's undocumented legend, it was founded in 707 AD. There is another theory that the shrine was built when Mimasaka Province separated from Bizen Province in 703. The earliest time the shrine appears in documentary evidence is in an entry dated 860 in the Nihon Sandai Jitsuroku. Per the Engishiki, which was complied between 905 and 967 AD, the shrine is listed as the only Myōjin taisha (名神大社) in Mimasaka Province, and by the Kamakura period, it was regarded as the ichinomiya of the province. During the Sengoku period, in 1533, the shrine was burned down by Amago Haruhisa during his invasion of the province, and reconstructed by Haruhisa himself in 1559. After the Meiji Restoration, it was designated as a National Shrine, 2nd rank (国幣中社, Kokuhei Chusha) in 1871.

== Cultural properties ==
=== National Important Cultural Properties ===
- Honden (本殿), Muromachi period (1559); Constructed as a donation by Amago Haruhisa. It is a three by three bay halls in a unique shrine architecture commonly known as "Nakayama-zukuri" which is found only in this area of Japan.

== Gallery ==
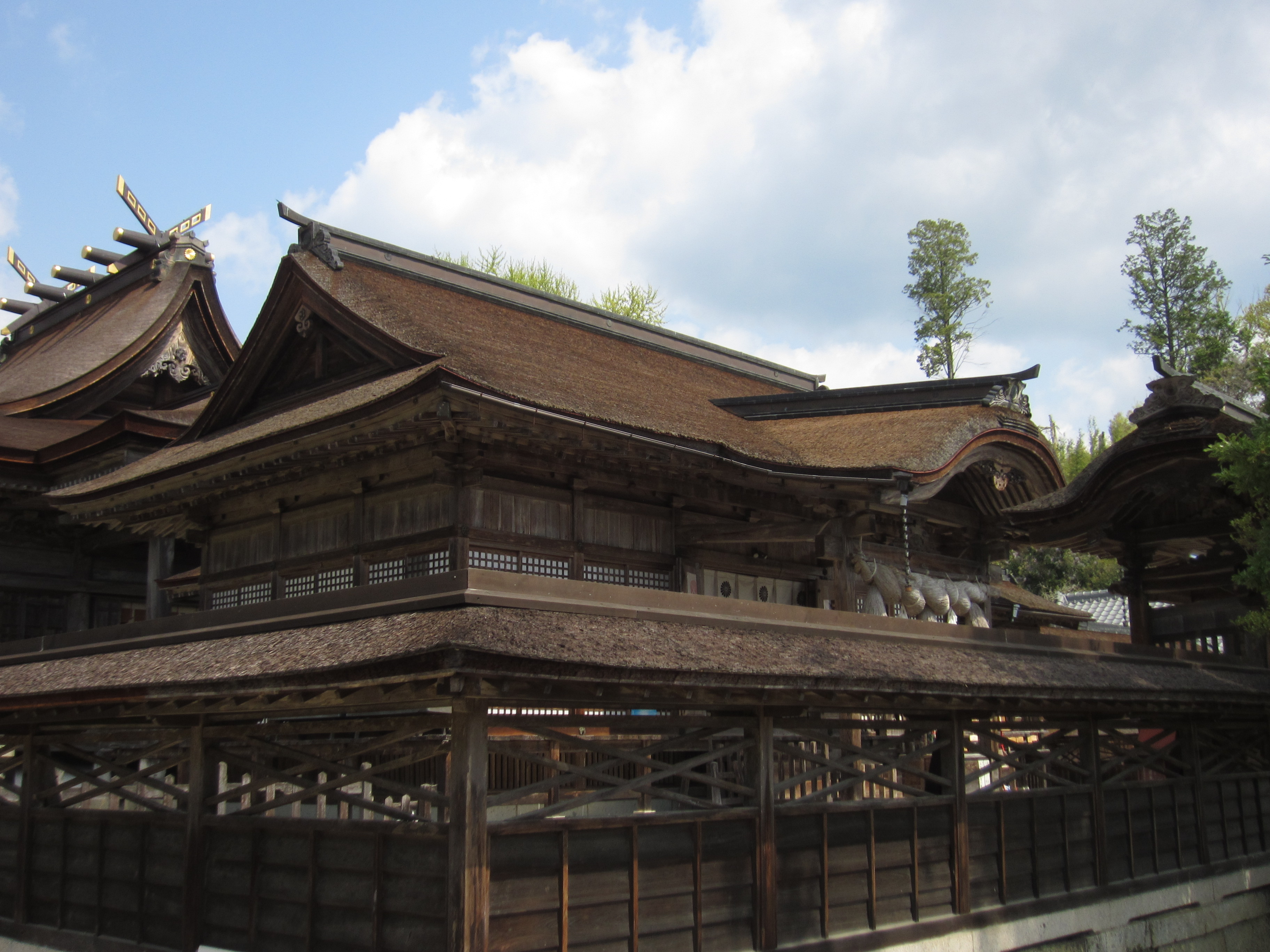
Haiden

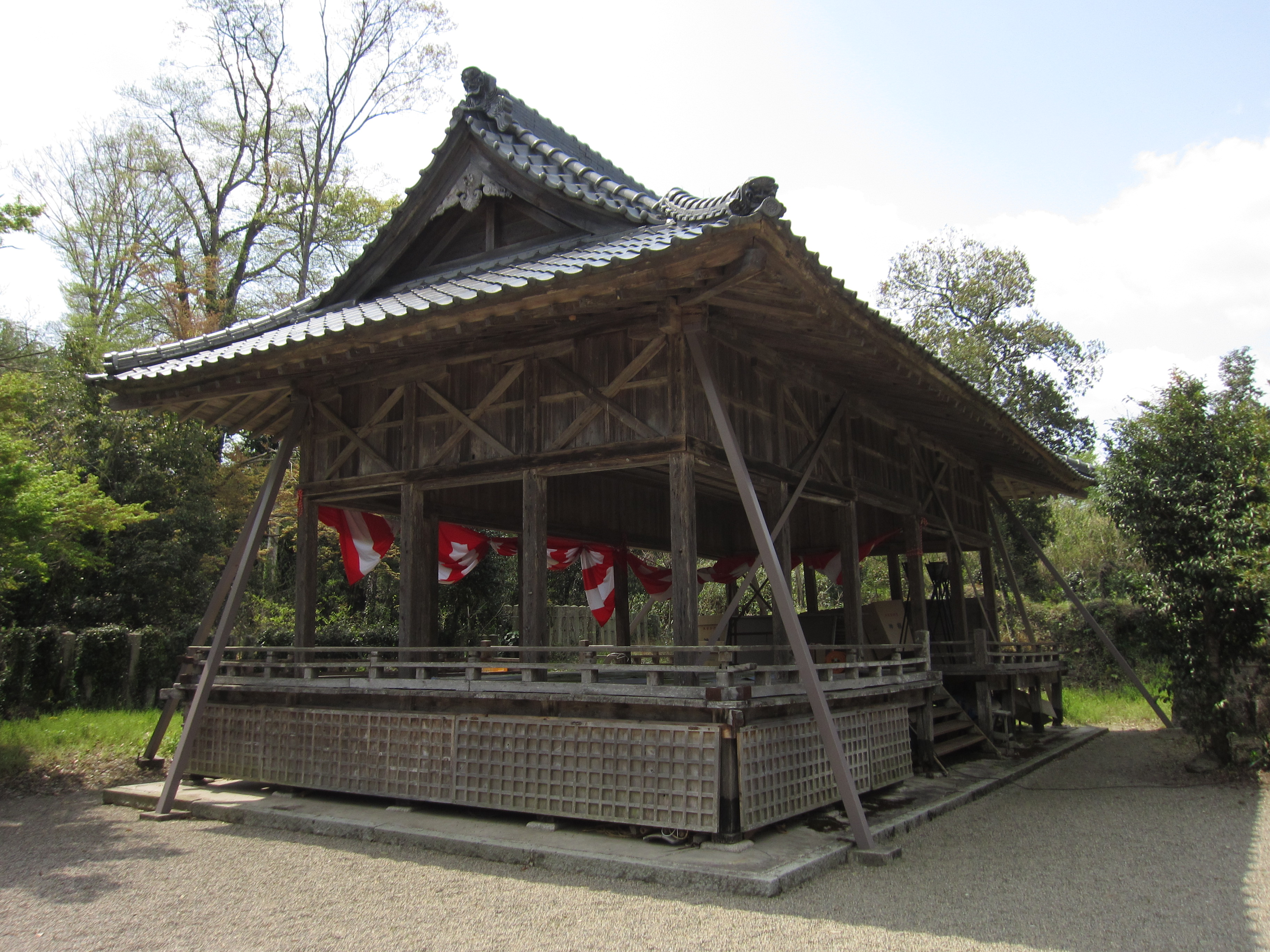
Kagura stage

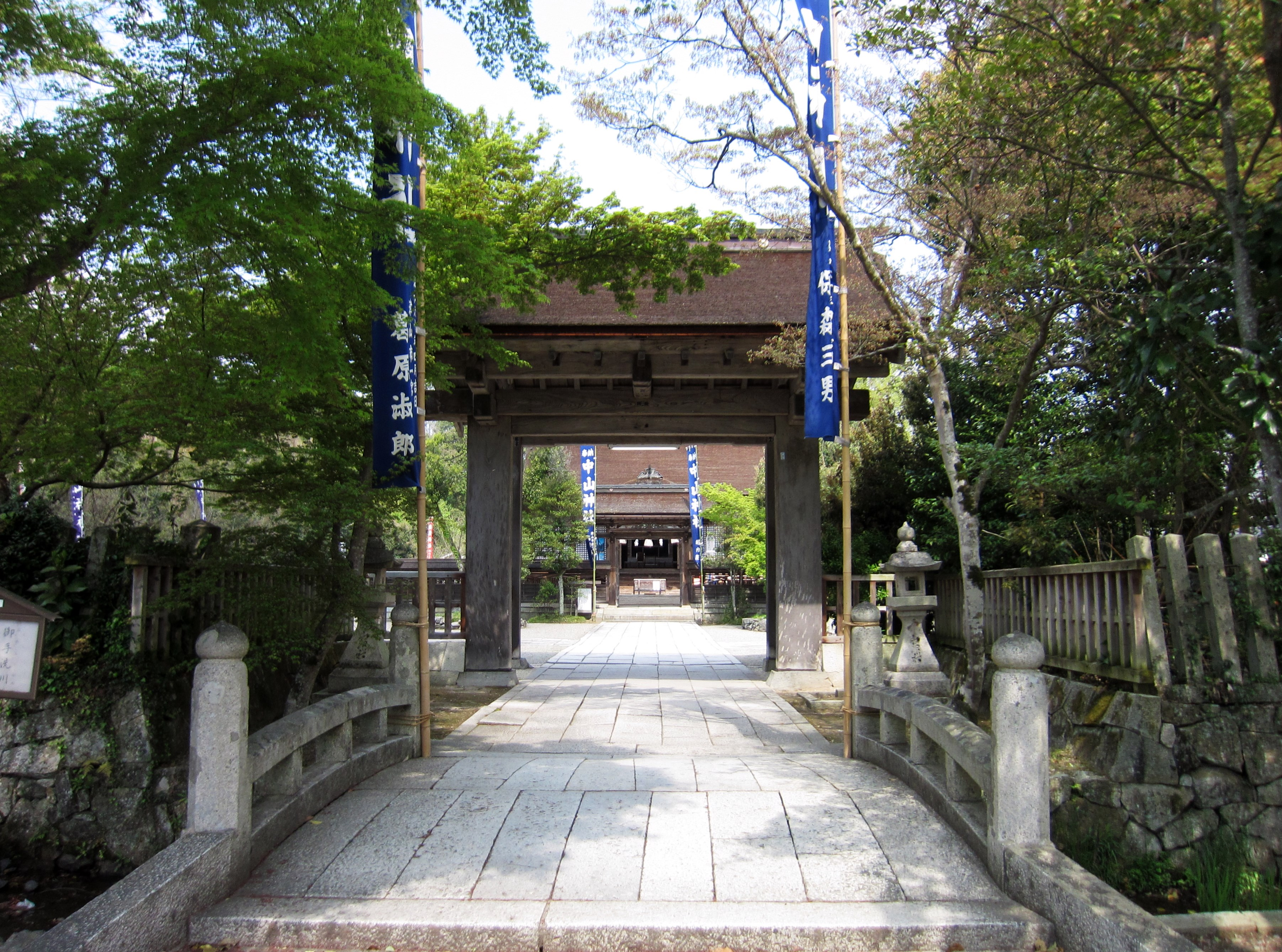
Gate（Tsuyama City Tangible Cultural Property）

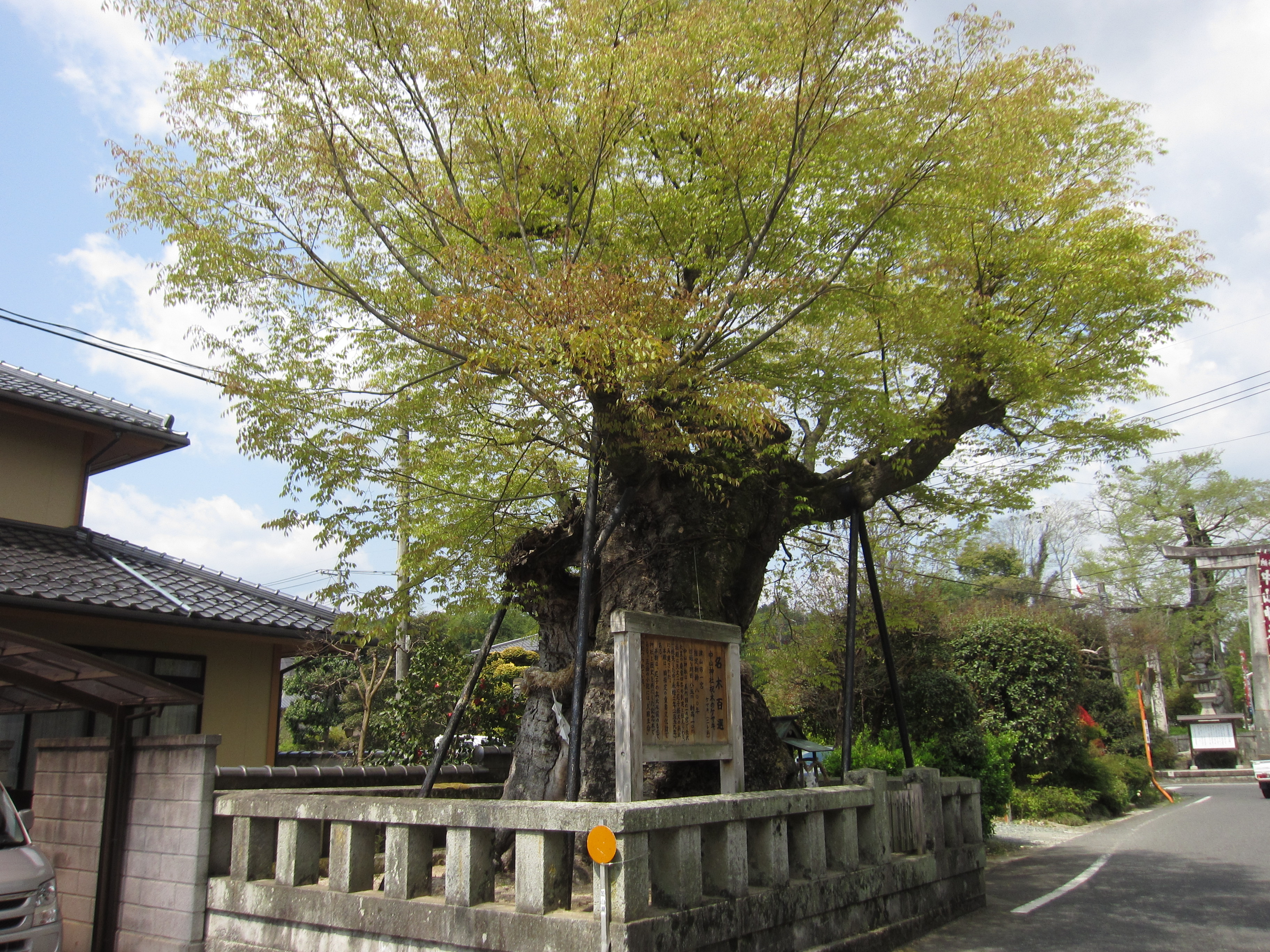
Keyaki Tree（Tsuyama City Natural Monument）

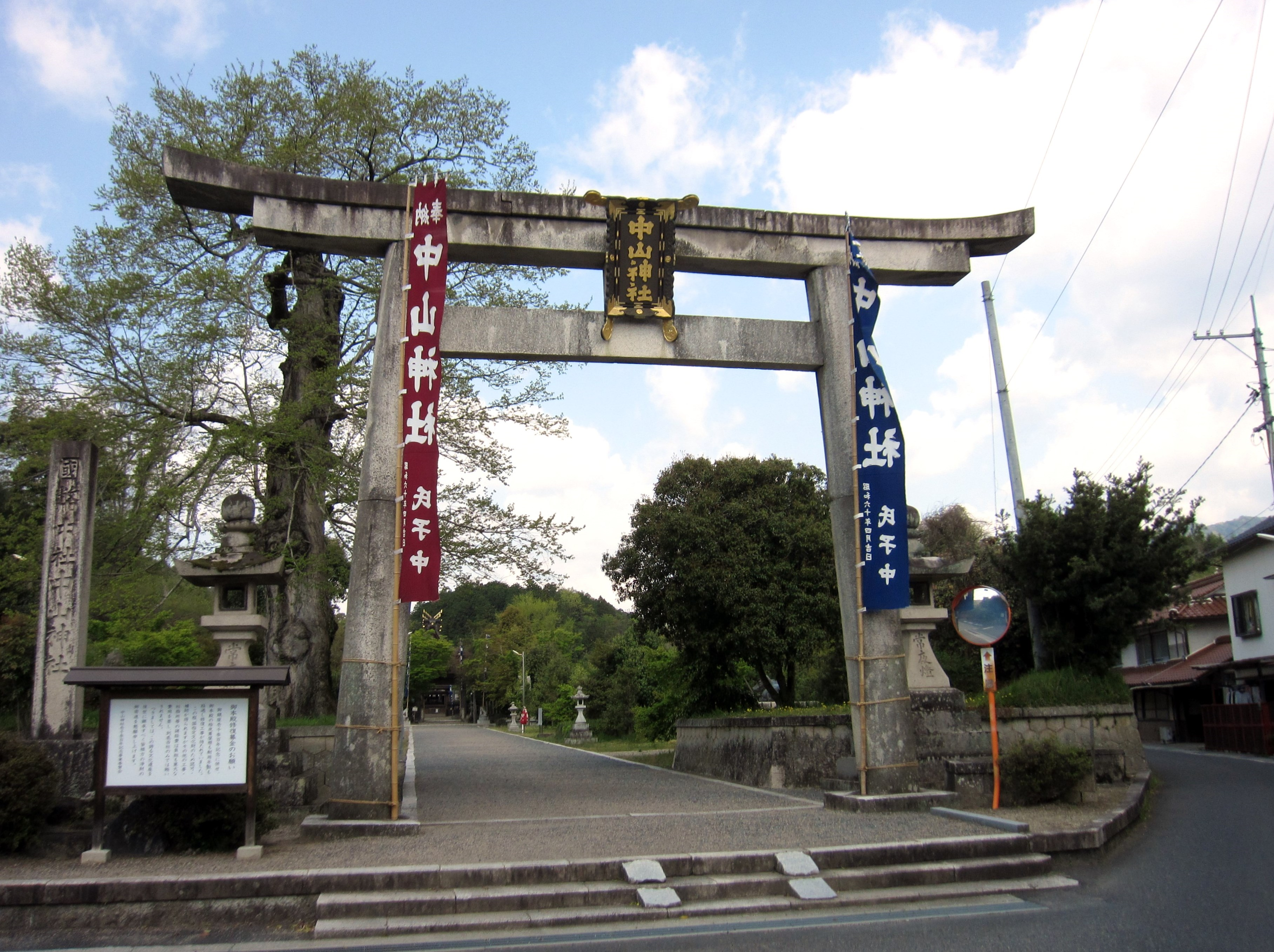
Torii

== See also ==
- Ichinomiya
