= Ikukunitama Shrine =

Shrine in Osaka Prefecture, Japan

Ikukunitama Shrine (生國魂神社)
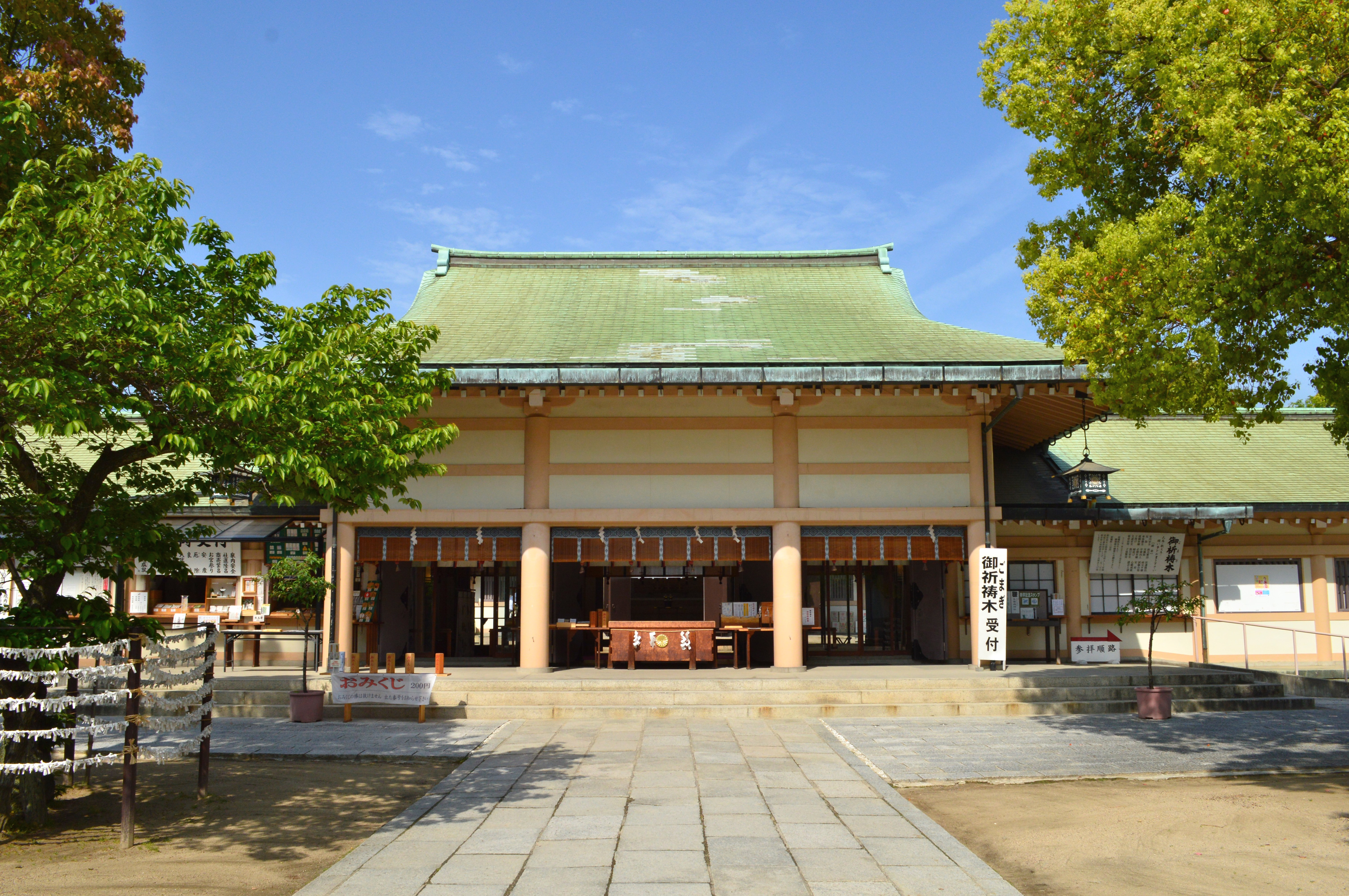
- Ikukunitama Jinja Honden

- Location within Japan

Religion
- Affiliation: Shinto

Location
- Interactive map of Ikukunitama Shrine (生國魂神社)
- Coordinates: 34.6651°N 135.5126°E

Ikukunitama Shrine (生國魂神社, Ikukunitama jinja) is a Shinto shrine located in Tennōji-ku, Osaka Prefecture, Japan. Its main festival is held annually on September 9. It was formerly an imperial shrine of the first rank (官幣大社, kanpei taisha) in the Modern system of ranked Shinto Shrines.
