= Tsutsukowake Shrine =

Shrine in Tanakura, Fukushima, Japan

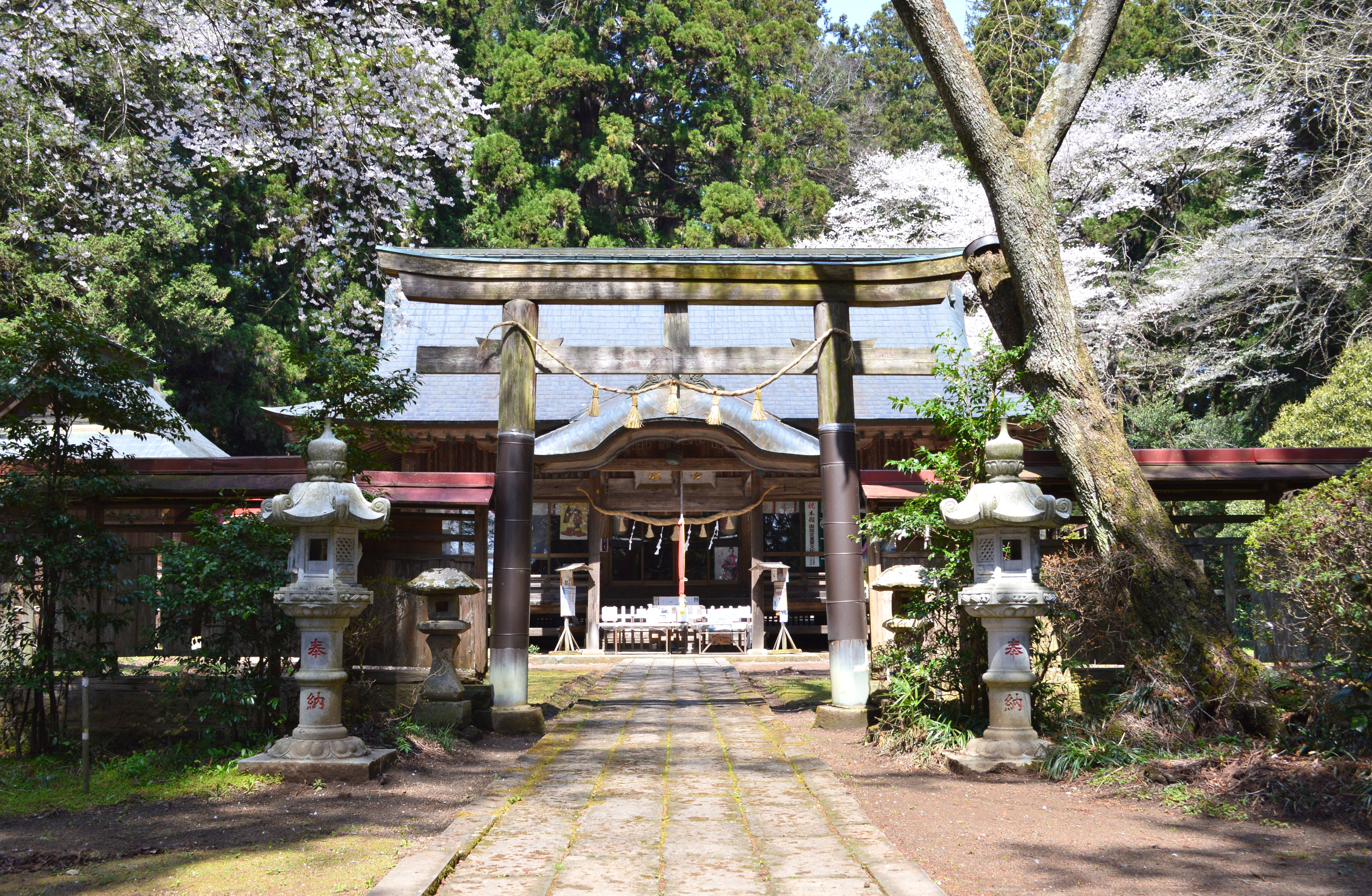

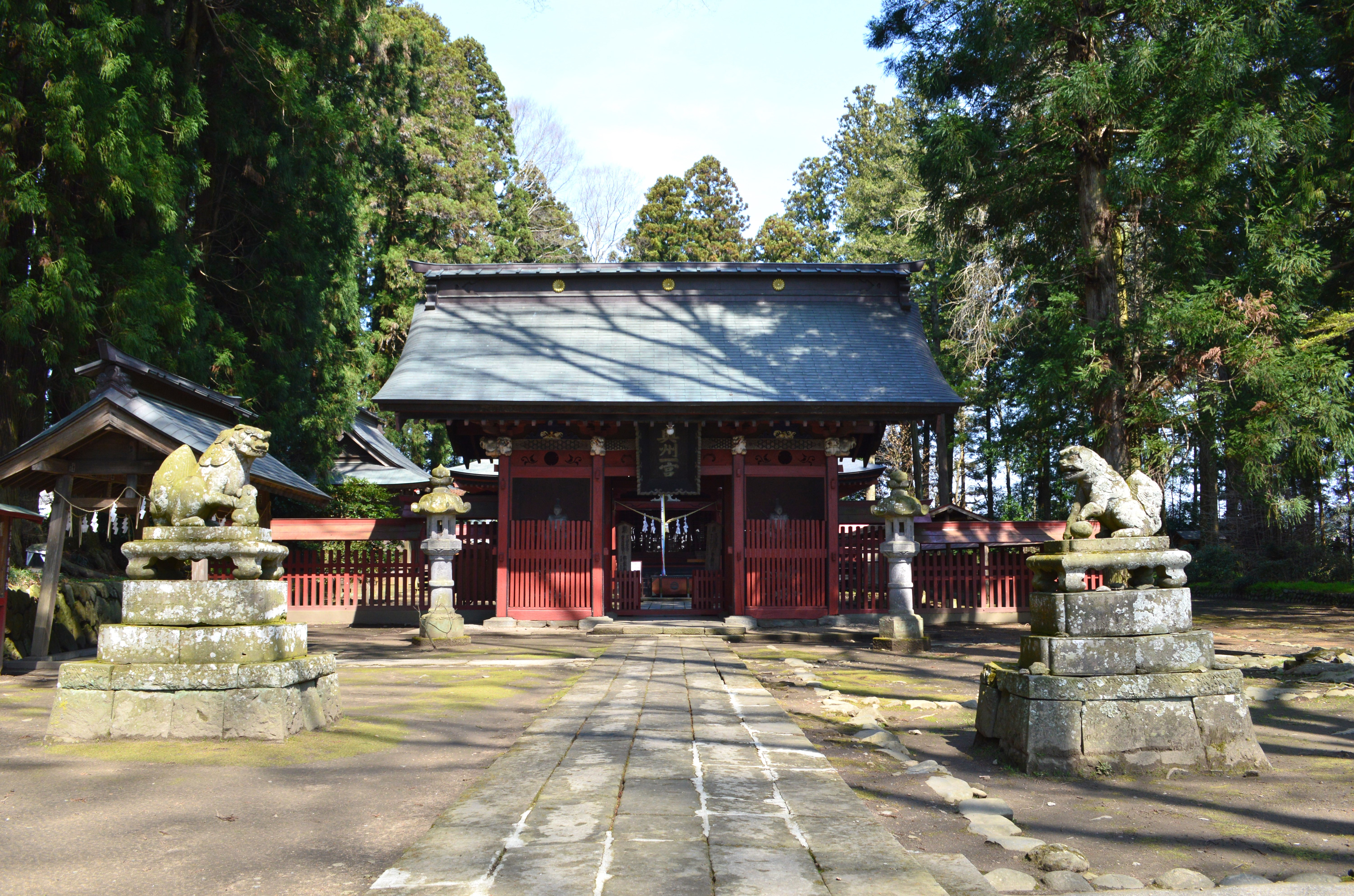

Tsutsukowake Shrine (都々古別神社, Tsutsukowake jinja) is a Shinto shrine located in Tanagura, Fukushima Prefecture, Japan. It was the ichinomiya of Mutsu Province. According to legend, it was founded in 807.

== See also ==
- List of Shinto shrines in Japan
