= Ōarai Isosaki Shrine =

Shinto shrine in Japan

Coordinates: 36.3160°N 140.5877°E

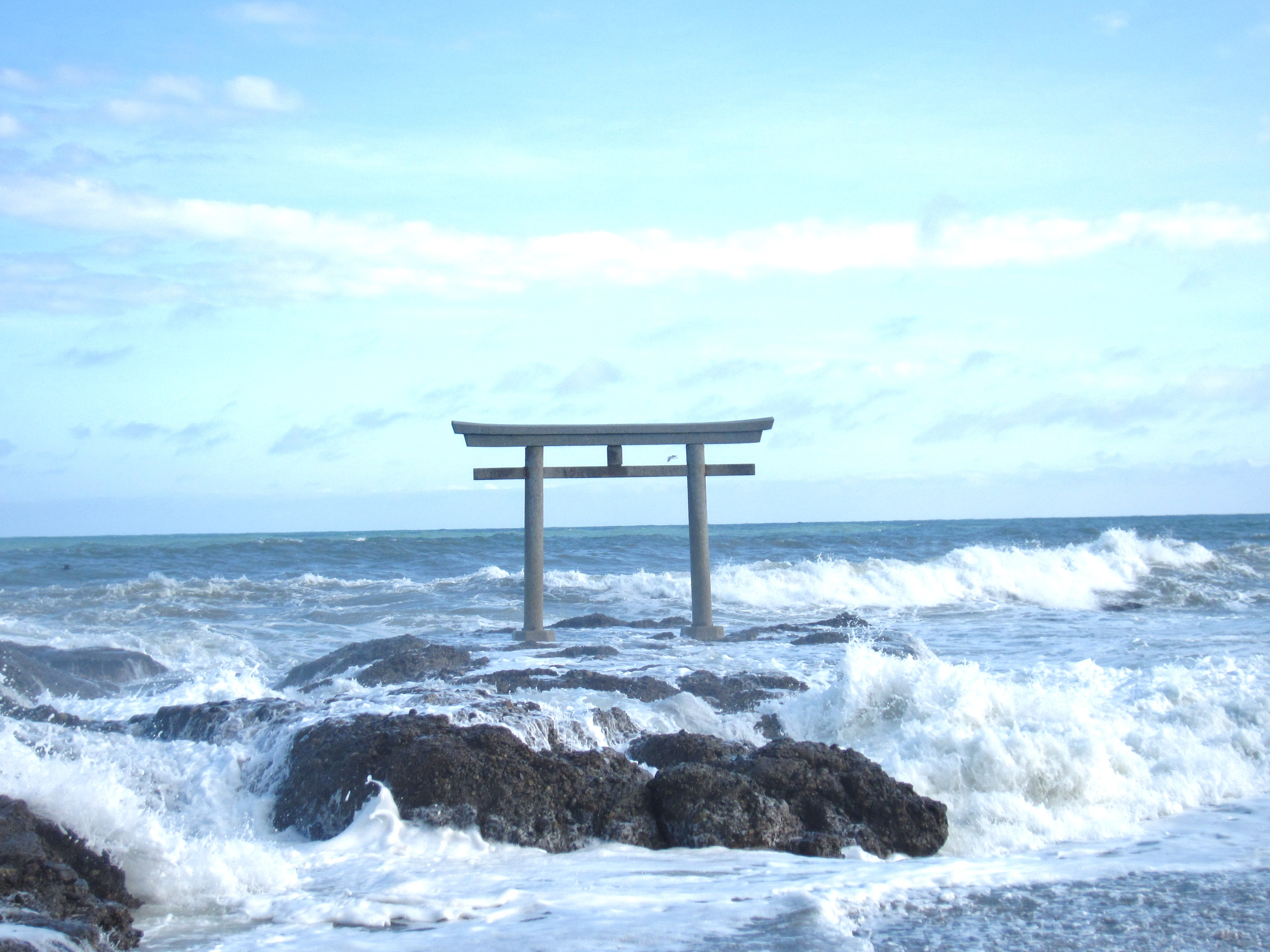
- Kamiiso torii gate (神磯) of Ōarai Isosaki Shrine.

Religion
- Affiliation: Shinto
- Deity: Ōkuninushi; Sukunabikona

Location
- Interactive map of Ōarai Isosaki Shrine

Ōarai Isosaki Shrine (Japanese: 大洗磯前神社, Hepburn: Ōarai Isosaki Jinja) is a Shinto Shrine located in Ōarai, Ibaraki on Mount Ōarai. According to records in Nihon Montoku Tennō Jitsuroku, it was established in 856 when it was said two kami, Ōkuninushi and Sukunabikona, ascended from the ocean.
