= Isasumi Shrine =

Shinto shrine in Fukushima Prefecture, Japan

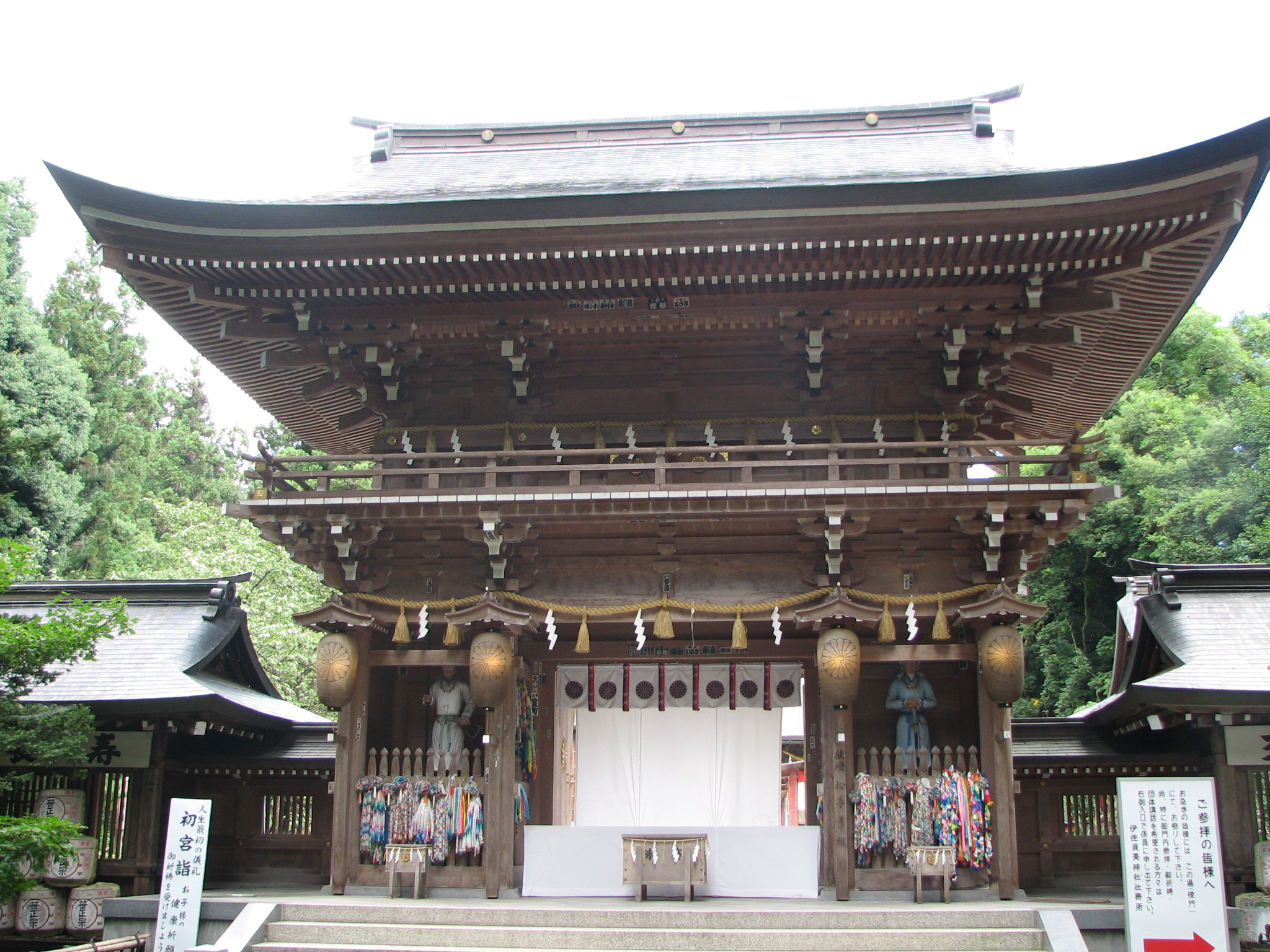
- The rōmon gate of Isasumi Shrine

- Location within Fukushima Prefecture Location within Japan

Religion
- Affiliation: Shinto

Location
- Location: Aizumisato, Fukushima, Japan
- Coordinates: 37°27′24″N 139°50′26″E

Website
- www.aizu-reichi.gr.jp/isasumi/index.html

Isasumi Shrine (伊佐須美神社, Isasumi jinja) is a shrine in Aizumisato, Fukushima, Japan. Isasumi was designated as the chief Shinto shrine (ichinomiya) for the former Iwashiro province. From 1871 through 1946, Isasumi was officially designated one of the kokuhei-chūsha (国幣中社), meaning that it stood in the mid-range of ranked, nationally significant shrines.

Though not backed by accurate historical records, some believe the place name Aizumisato derives from this shrine. The shrine is also the locale for the annual taue-shinji, or rice planting, Shinto ritual. This ritual has been performed in this shrine for centuries, and the Fukushima Prefecture has designated the shrine an Important Intangible Folk Cultural Property. Currently, the festival of the rice planting is known as the Otaue Festival. The festival falls on July 11 or 12 annually. The rice planting ceremony, held during the daytime, is considered as important and reverential as the Asataue, or morning planting, ceremony of the Ise Grand Shrine and the Yutaue (evening planting) held at the Atsuta Shrine. The rice planting ceremony at the Isasumi Shrine is widely regarded as one of the highlights of the Shinto rituals.

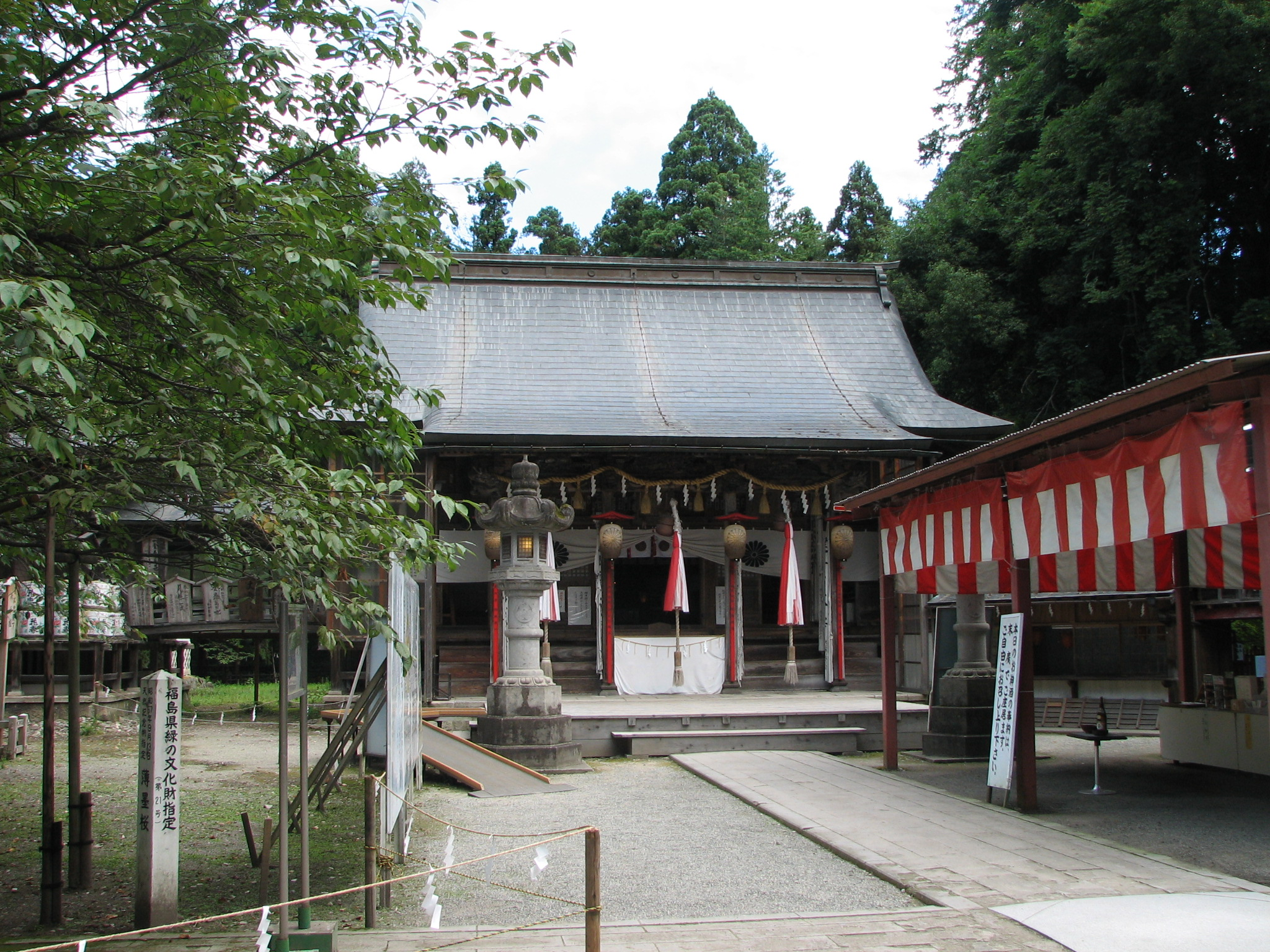
The haiden of the Isasumi Shrine.

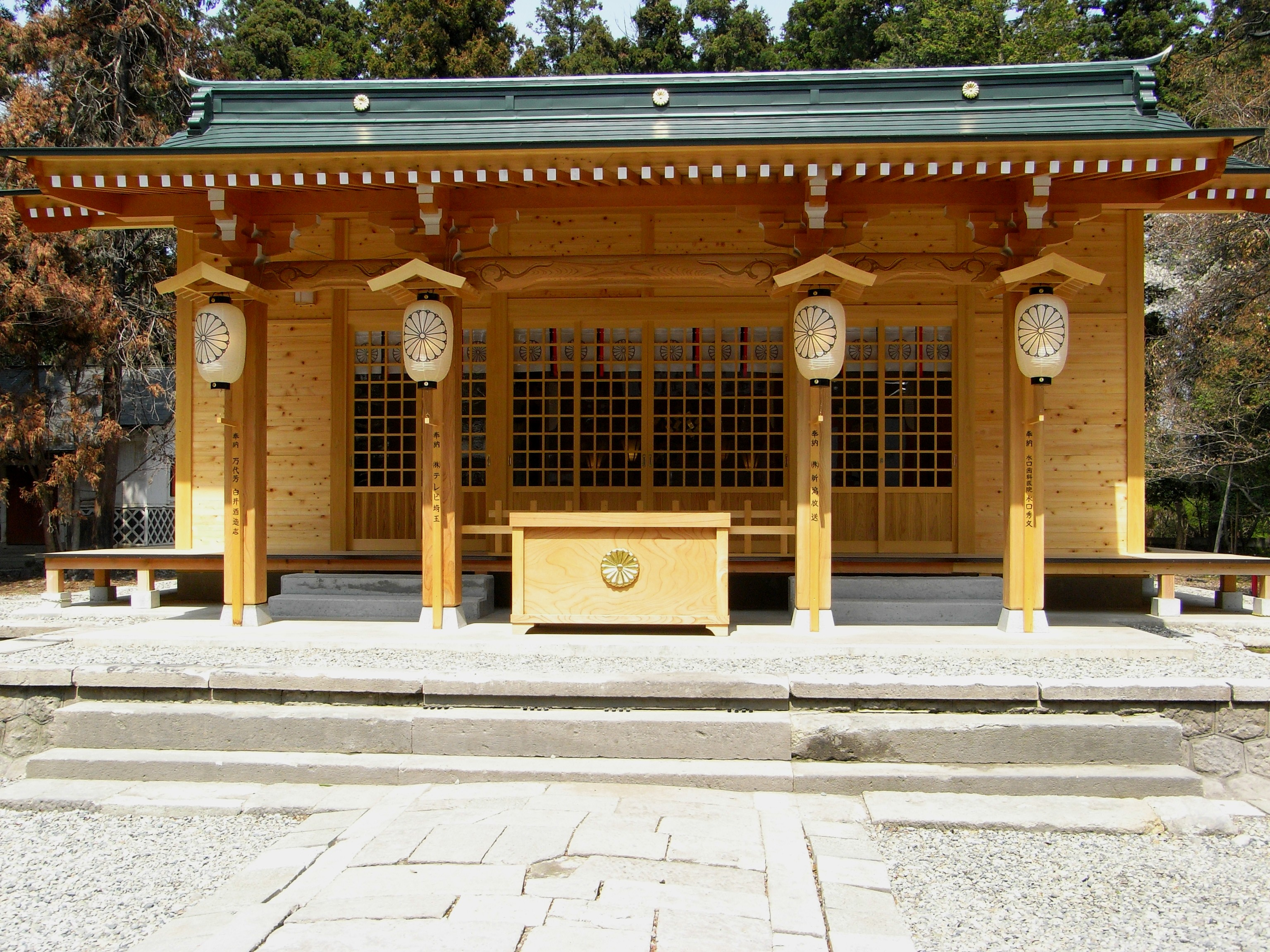
The Kari-honden of the Isasumi Shrine.
