= Umenomiya Taisha =

Shinto shrines in Kyoto, Japan

Umenomiya Shrine (梅宮大社, Umenomiya taisha)
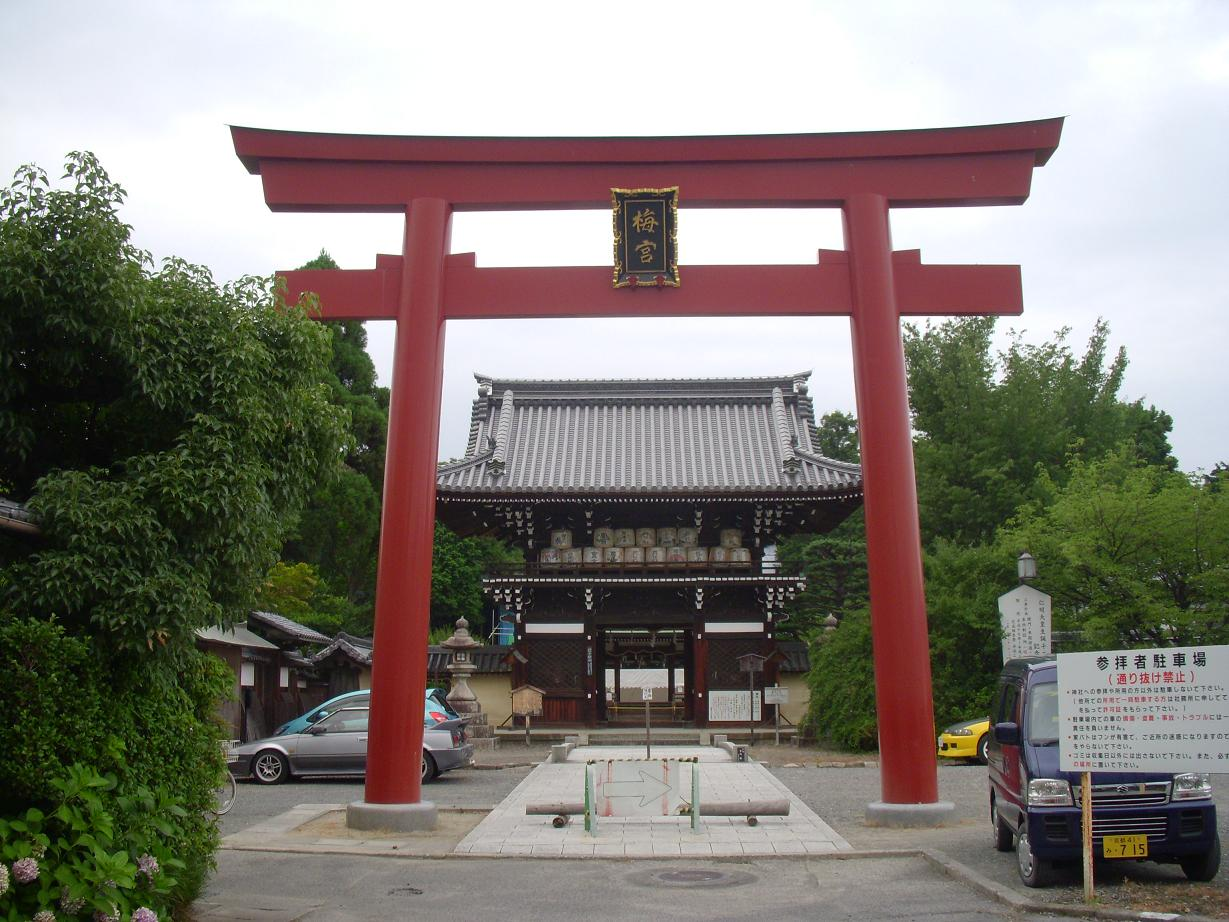
- Red torii at Umenomiya Shrine.

- Location within Japan

Religion
- Affiliation: Shinto

Location
- Location: Ukyō-ku in Kyoto, Japan.
- Interactive map of Umenomiya Shrine (梅宮大社, Umenomiya taisha)
- Coordinates: 35°00′15″N 135°41′42″E

Architecture
- Established: 965

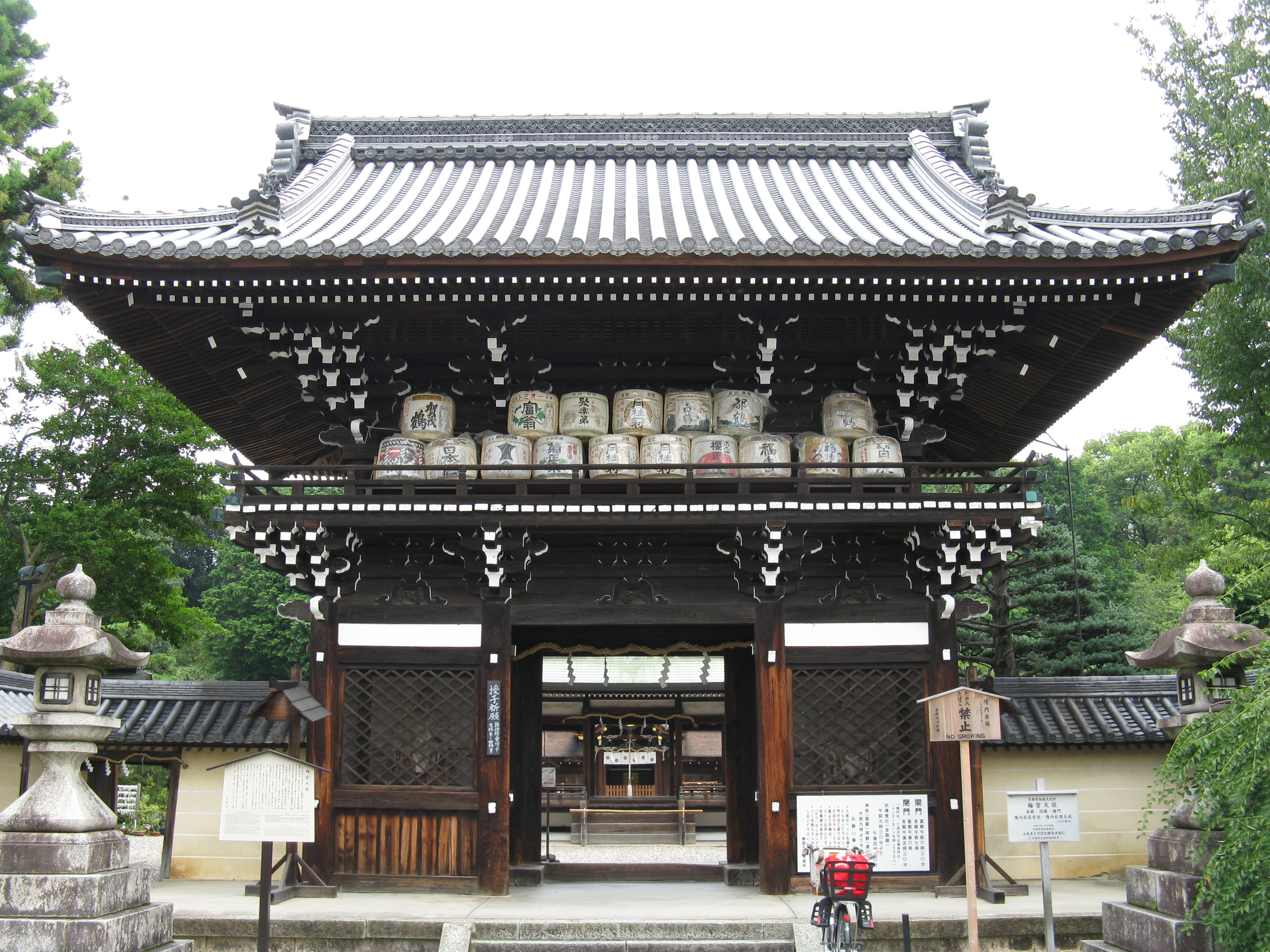
Main gate of Umenomiya Shrine

Umenomiya Shrine (梅宮大社, Umenomiya taisha) is a Shinto shrine located in Ukyō-ku in Kyoto, Japan.

== History ==
The shrine became the object of Imperial patronage during the early Heian period. In 965, Emperor Murakami ordered that Imperial messengers were sent to report important events to the guardian kami of Japan. These heihaku were initially presented to 16 shrines; and in 991, Emperor Ichijō added three more shrines to Murakami's list. Three years later in 994, Ichijō refined the scope of that composite list by adding Umenomiya Shrine (梅宮神社, Umenomiya-jinja) and Gion Shrine, which is now known as Yasaka Jinja.

From 1871 through 1946, the Umenomiya Shrine was officially designated one of the Kanpei-chūsha (官幣中社), meaning that it stood in the second rank of government supported shrines.

== See also ==
- List of Shinto shrines
- Twenty-Two Shrines
- Modern system of ranked Shinto shrines
