= Haguro =

Haguro (羽黒) can refer to:

- Mount Haguro (Haguro-san), Yamagata Prefecture, Japan, one of the sacred Three Mountains of Dewa.
- Haguro, Yamagata, a previous town now part of Tsuruoka
- Japanese cruiser Haguro, a Myōkō-class heavy cruiser of the Imperial Japanese Navy, commissioned in 1929 and sunk in 1945
- JS Haguro, a Maya-class guided missile destroyer in the Japanese Maritime Self-Defense Force, commissioned in 2021
- A previous train express service, see Akebono (train)

== See also ==
- Haguroyama (disambiguation)
- Haguro Station (disambiguation)
- Ohaguro
