= Nanatsu Falls =

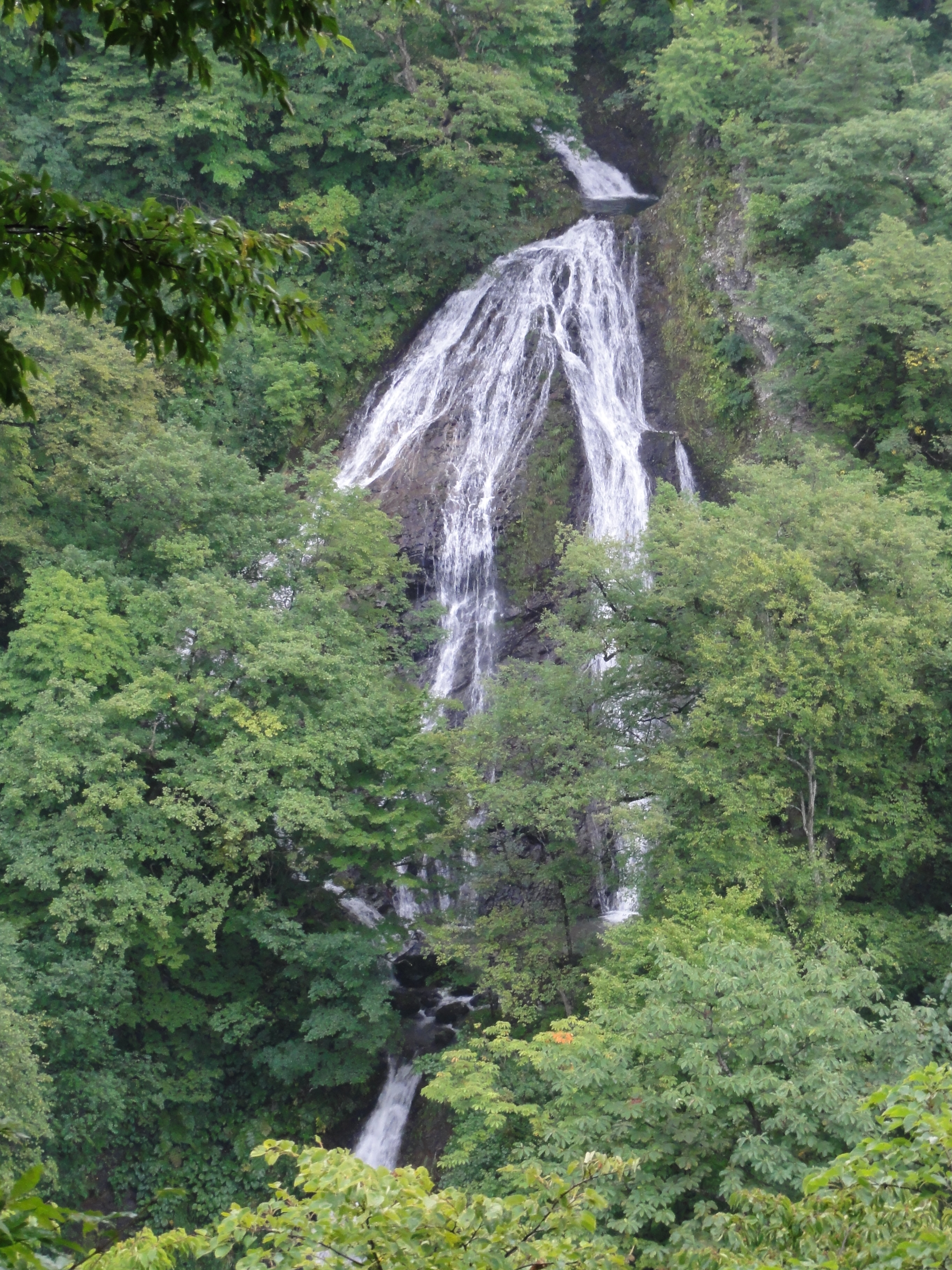

- Location within Japan
- Location: Tsuruoka, Yamagata, Japan
- Coordinates: 38°33′48″N 139°55′44″E
- Type: Multi-step Segmented
- Total height: 90 m (300 ft)
- Longest drop: 50 m (160 ft)

Nanatsu Falls (七ツ滝, Nanatsu-taki) is a waterfall located in the city of Tsuruoka, Yamagata Prefecture, Japan, on a branch of the Bonji River. It is one of "Japan's Top 100 Waterfalls", in a listing published by the Japanese Ministry of the Environment in 1990.

As the name of the falls implies, it splits into seven streams over a large 100-metre (330 ft) outcrop of dacite. The falls were formerly on the pilgrimage route to the sacred Three Mountains of Dewa.
