= Dewa Mountains =

Mountain range in Japan

- 出羽山地 (Japanese)
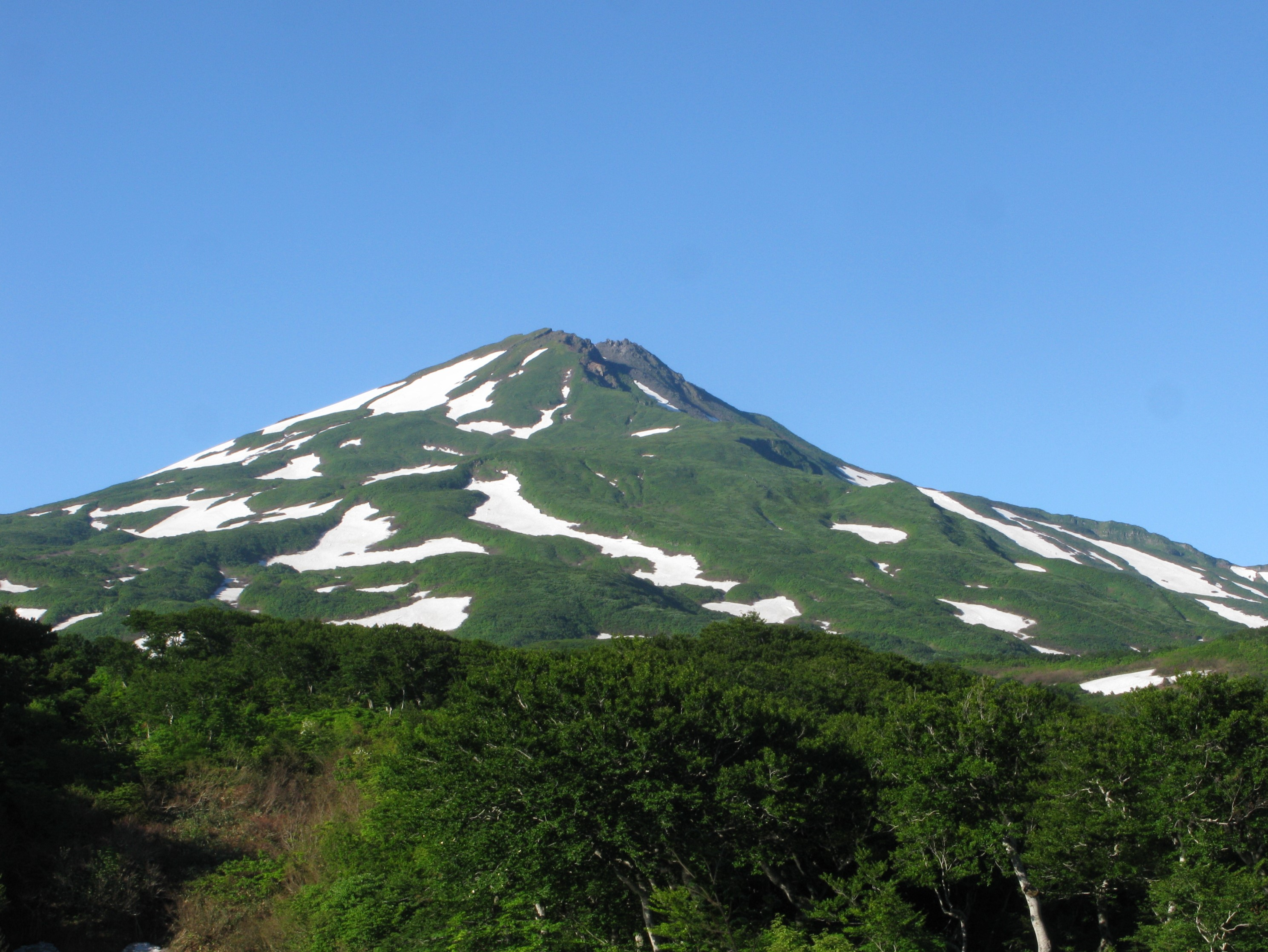
- Mount Chōkai

Highest point
- Peak: Mount Chōkai
- Elevation: 2,236 m (7,336 ft)
- Coordinates: 39°30′N 140°10′E

Geography
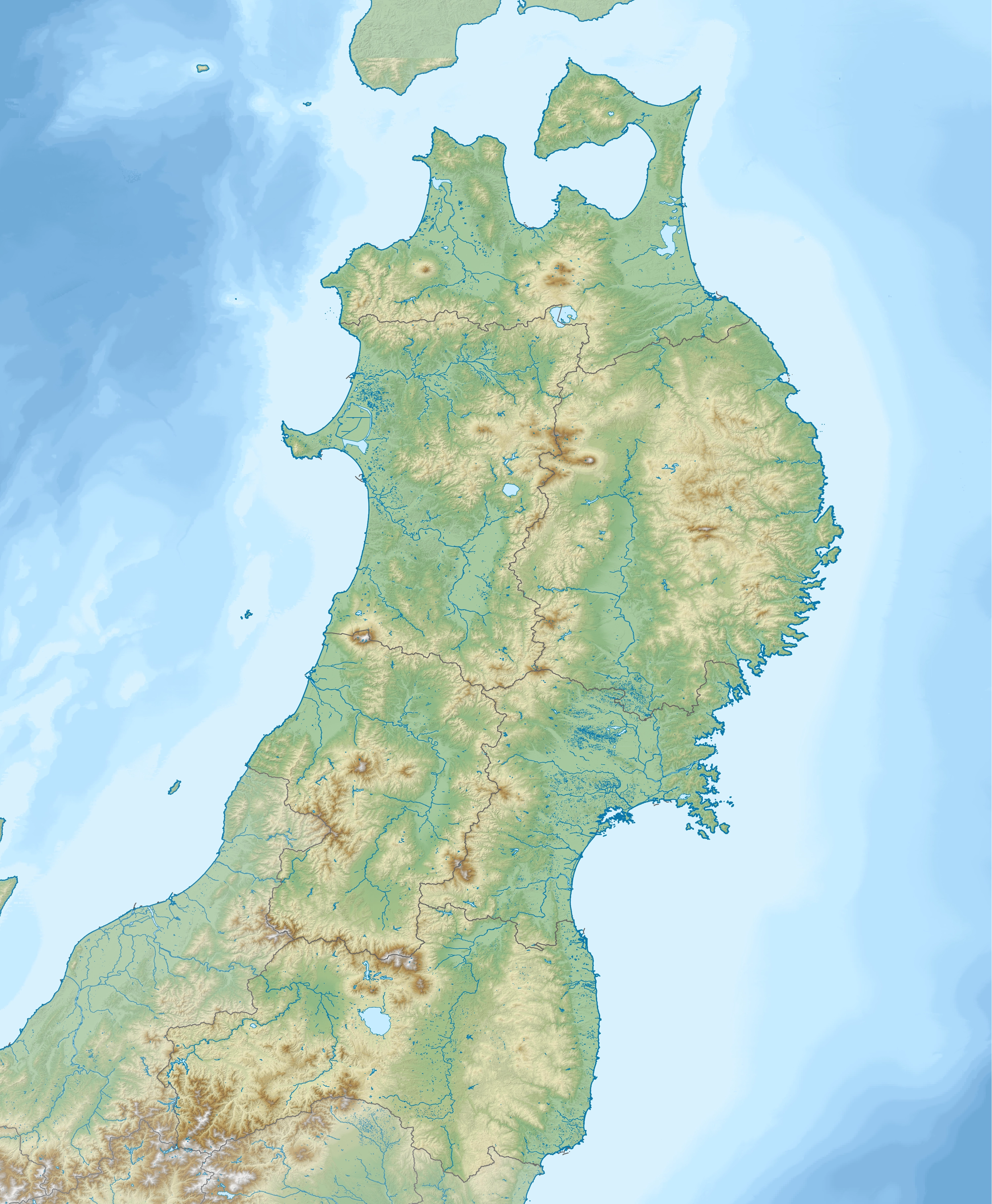
- Location within Tohoku, Japan Location within Japan
- Location: Nishikubiki District, Niigata
- Country: Japan
- Prefectures: Aomori; Akita; Yamagata
- Parent range: Japanese Alps

Dewa Mountains (Japanese: 出羽山地) is a mountain range that runs north and south on the west side of the Tohoku region of Japan. The mountain range spans Aomori, Akita, and Yamagata prefectures. The Dewa Mountains are split into several sub-ranges by the Yoneshiro River, the Omono River and the Mogami River. These sub-ranges include the Shirakami Mountains, the Tahei Mountains, The Choki Mountains, and the Chotake Mountains.The highest peak of the mountain range is Mount Chokai (2,236m).

== Flora and fauna ==
The Dewa Mountains are predominately covered with beech forest. In particular the Shirakawa mountains (Shirakawa-Sanchi) contain the last area of virgin Siebold’s beech forest - the remnants of a forest which once covered most of northern Japan. In 1993 this forest became one of the first areas in Japan listed as a UNESCO World Heritage Site.

== Dewa mountains in culture ==
The range is the focal point for the Akinomine (秋の嶺 "peak of autumn") ritual, which is observed by the Mount Haguro lineage of Shugendō.

== Individual mountains ==
- Mount Haguro
- Mount Chokai

== See also ==
- Three Mountains of Dewa
