= Dewa Shrine =

Mountain and shrine complex in Yamagata Prefecture, Japan

Mount Haguro (羽黒山, Haguro-san)
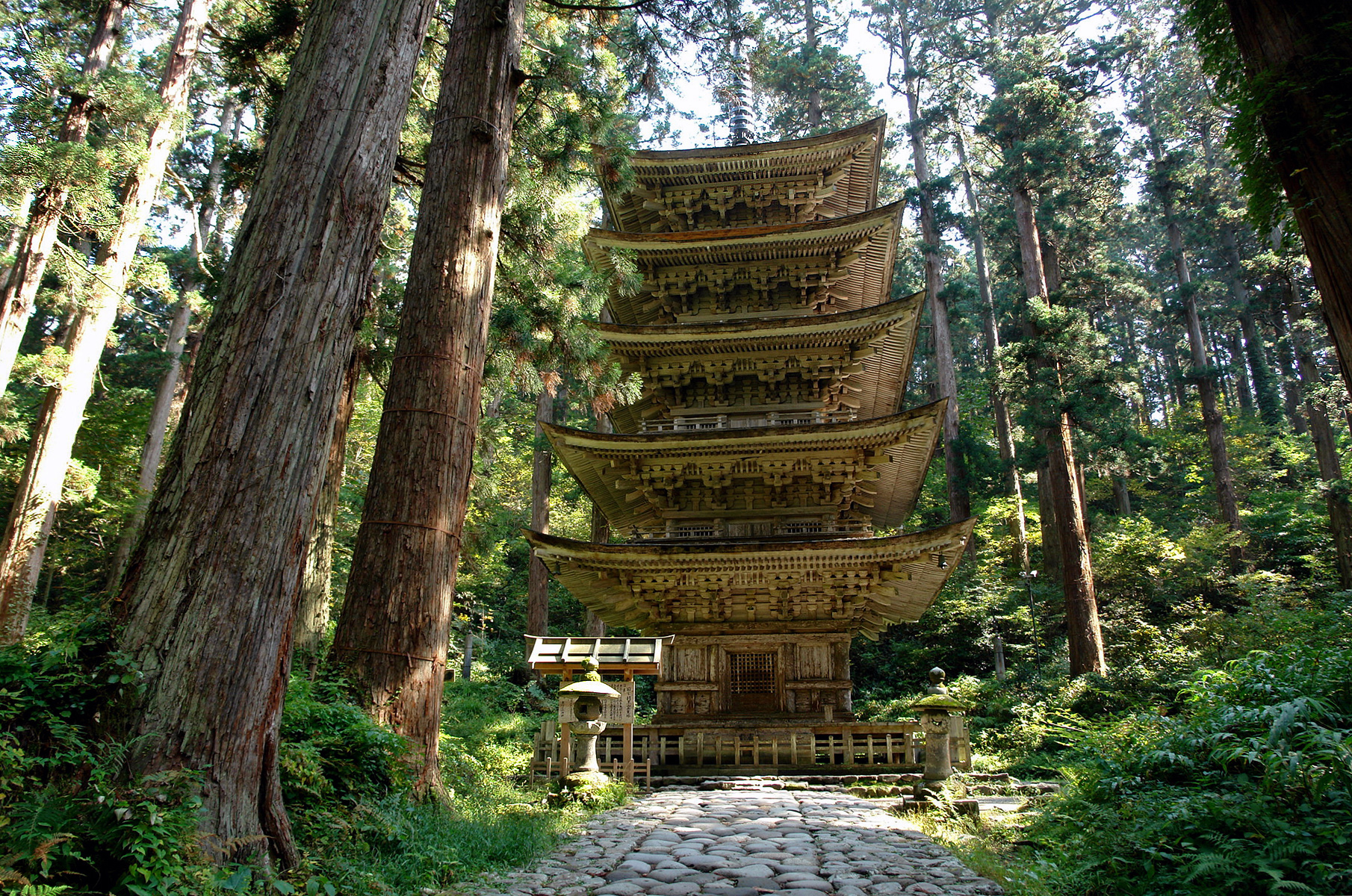
- The Gojū-tō Pagoda

- Location within Japan

Religion
- Affiliation: Shinto
- Deity: Ukanomitama

Location
- Coordinates: 38°42′09″N 139°58′58″E

Dewa Shrine (出羽神社, Dewa Jinja) is a major Shinto shrine associated with Shugendo on Mount Haguro, Japan. As the lowest of the three mountains, standing at 414 m (1,358 ft), it is the only one that is accessible throughout the year. By contrast Gassan Shrine and Yudonosan Shrine, which are closed during winter due to heavy snowfall. Because of this it is considered the main shrine.

A path of 2,446 stone steps leads to its summit amidst 600-year-old sugi trees, past the famous Gojūnotō (五重塔) five story pagoda, Grandpa cedar (jijisugi 爺杉), the 1000 years old cedar tree, and numerous shrines. The steps and the pagoda are listed as National Treasures. Dewa Shrine, also called Hagurosan Shrine or Sanjingōsaiden shrine (三神合祭殿) located at the summit venerates the spirits of all three mountains, making it the most important of all the three shrines.

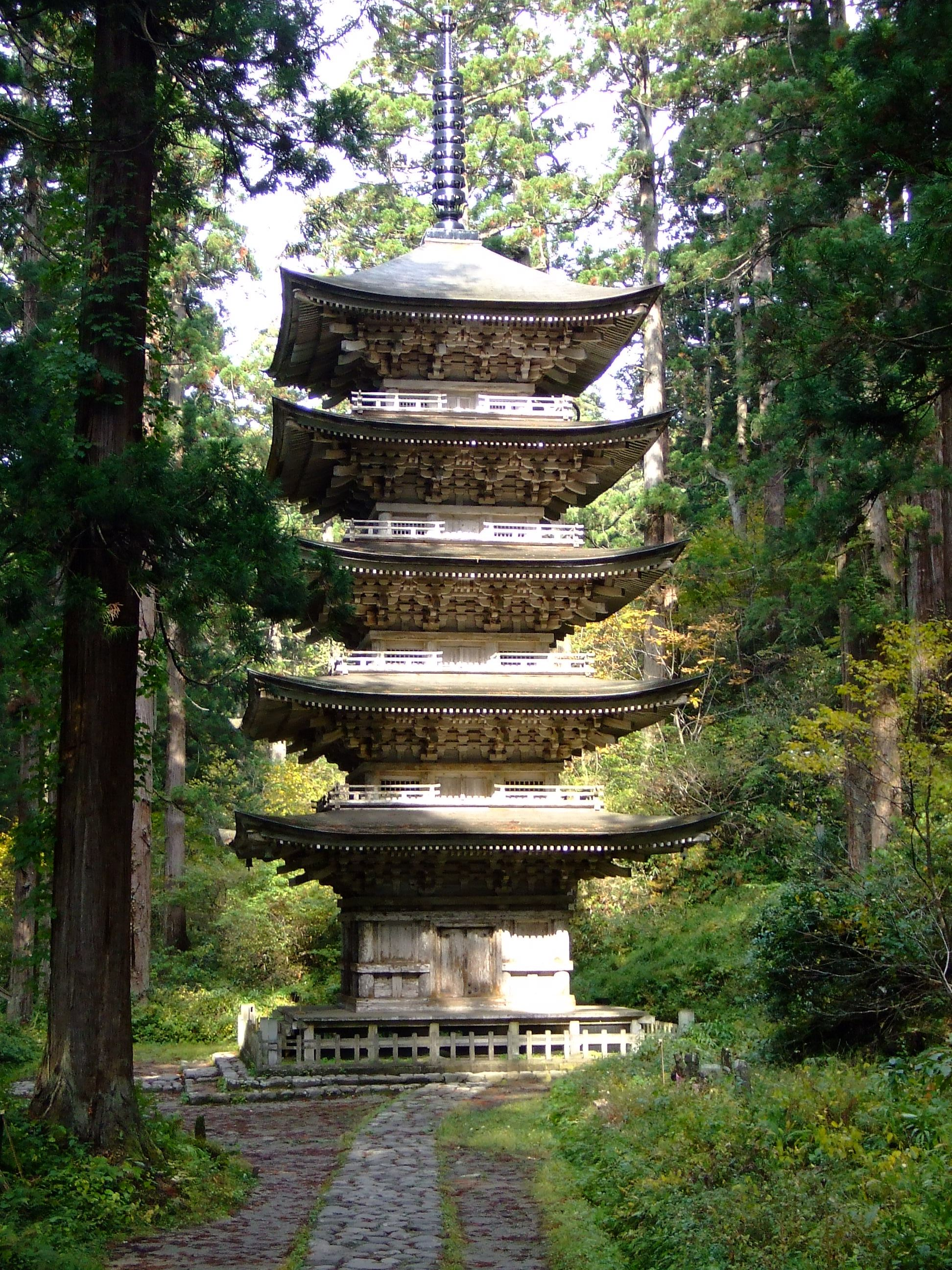
The Haguro five story pagoda

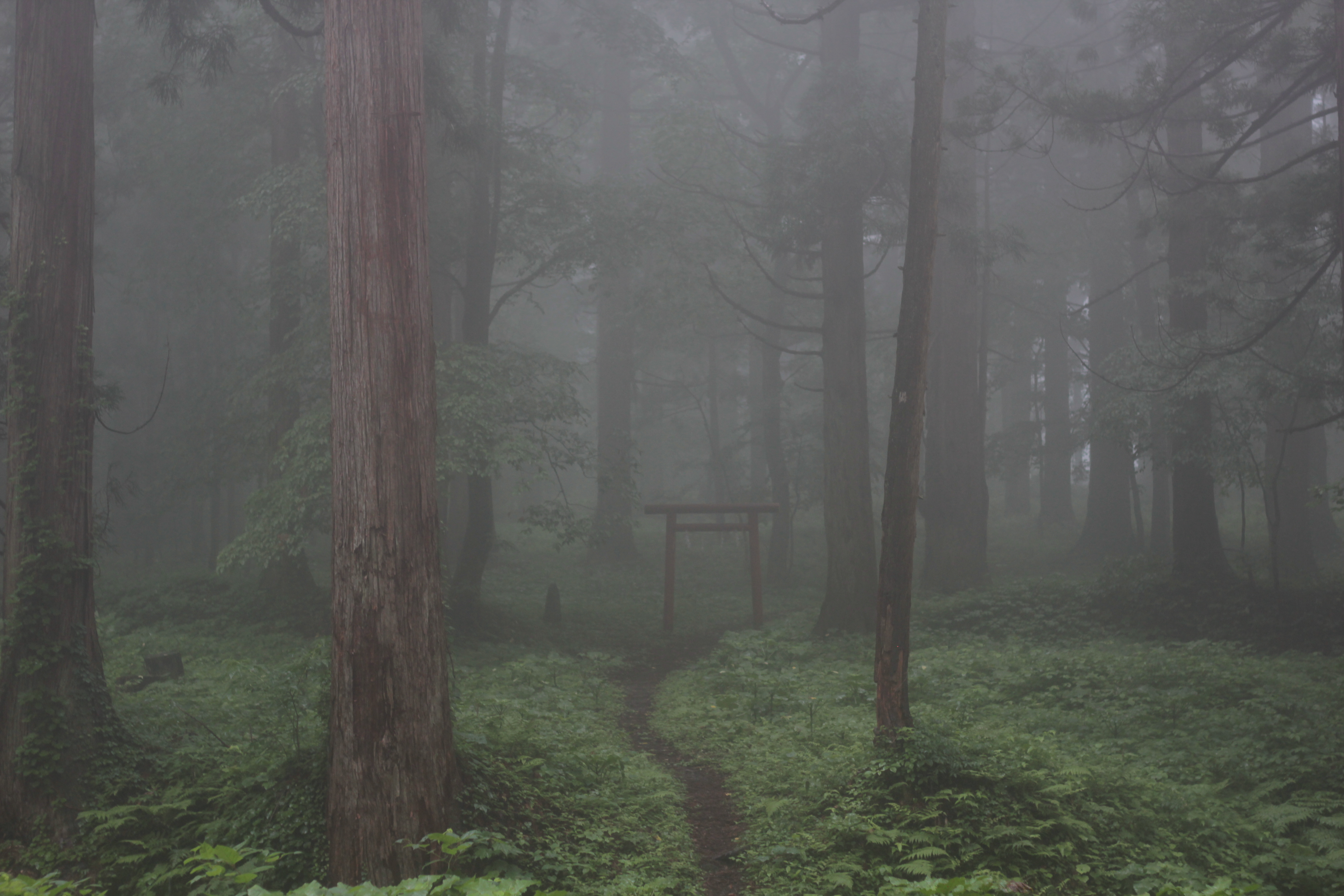
A torii on the way up the mountain

== Gallery ==
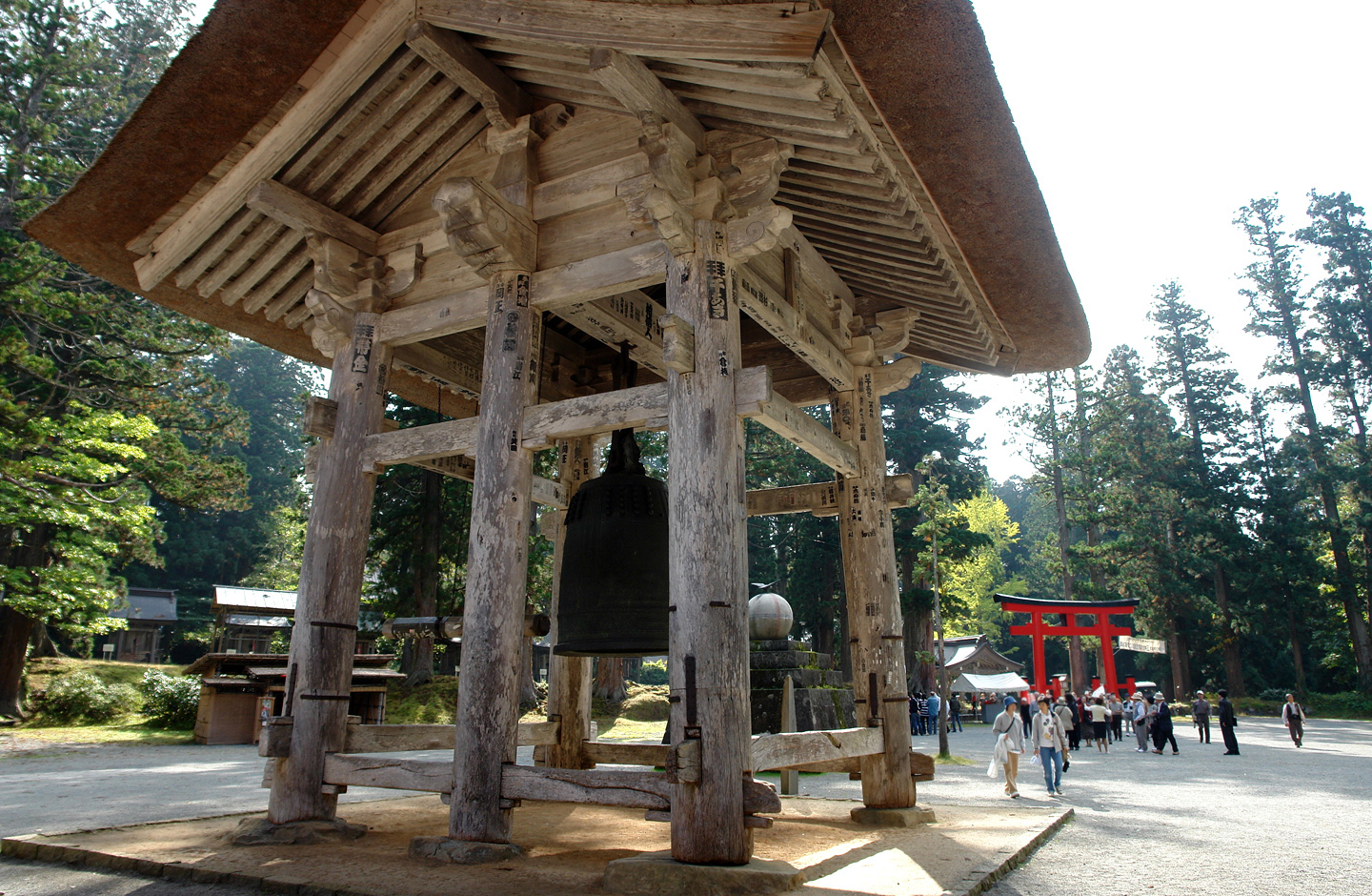
Shōrō

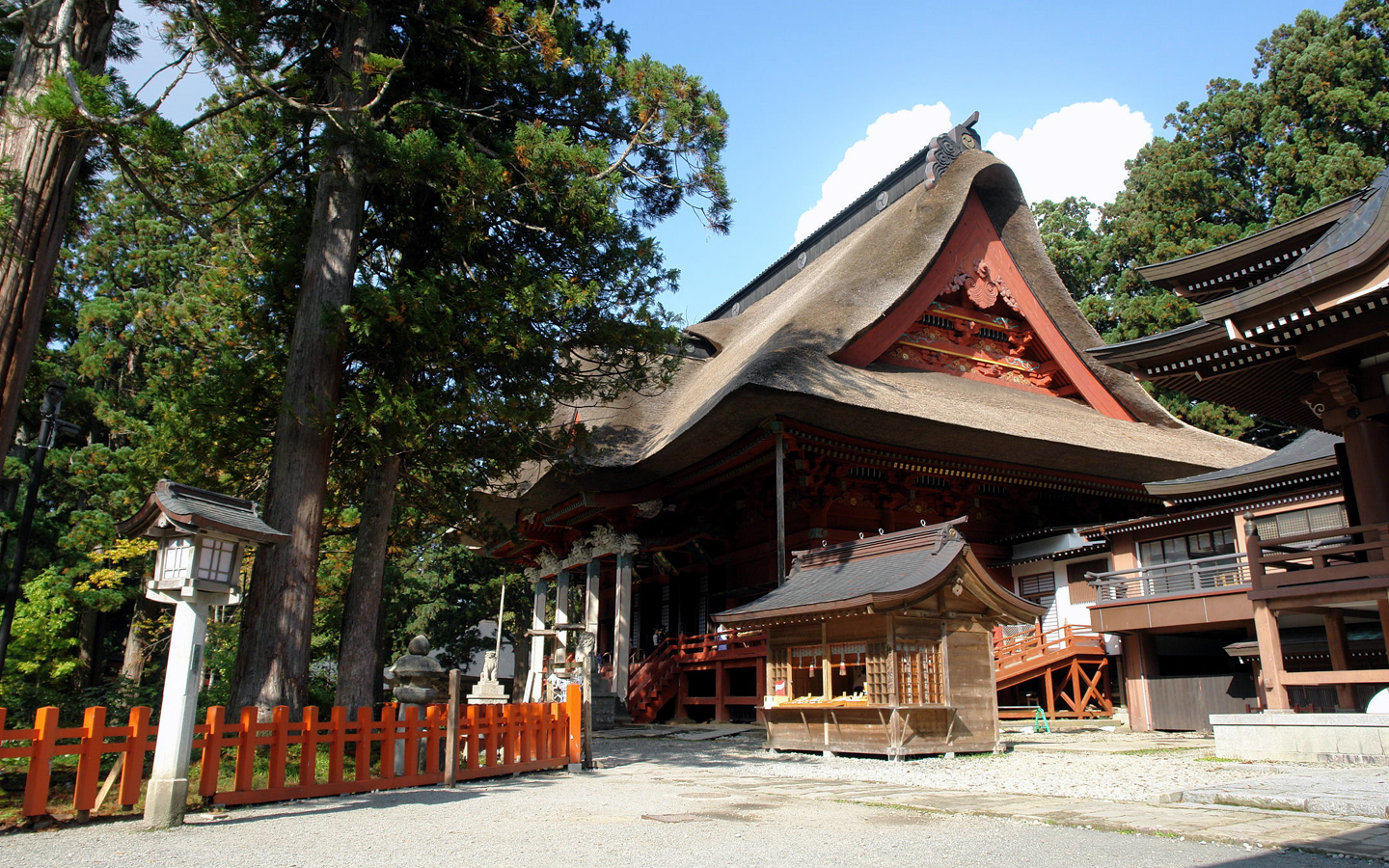
Sanzan Gosai-den temple

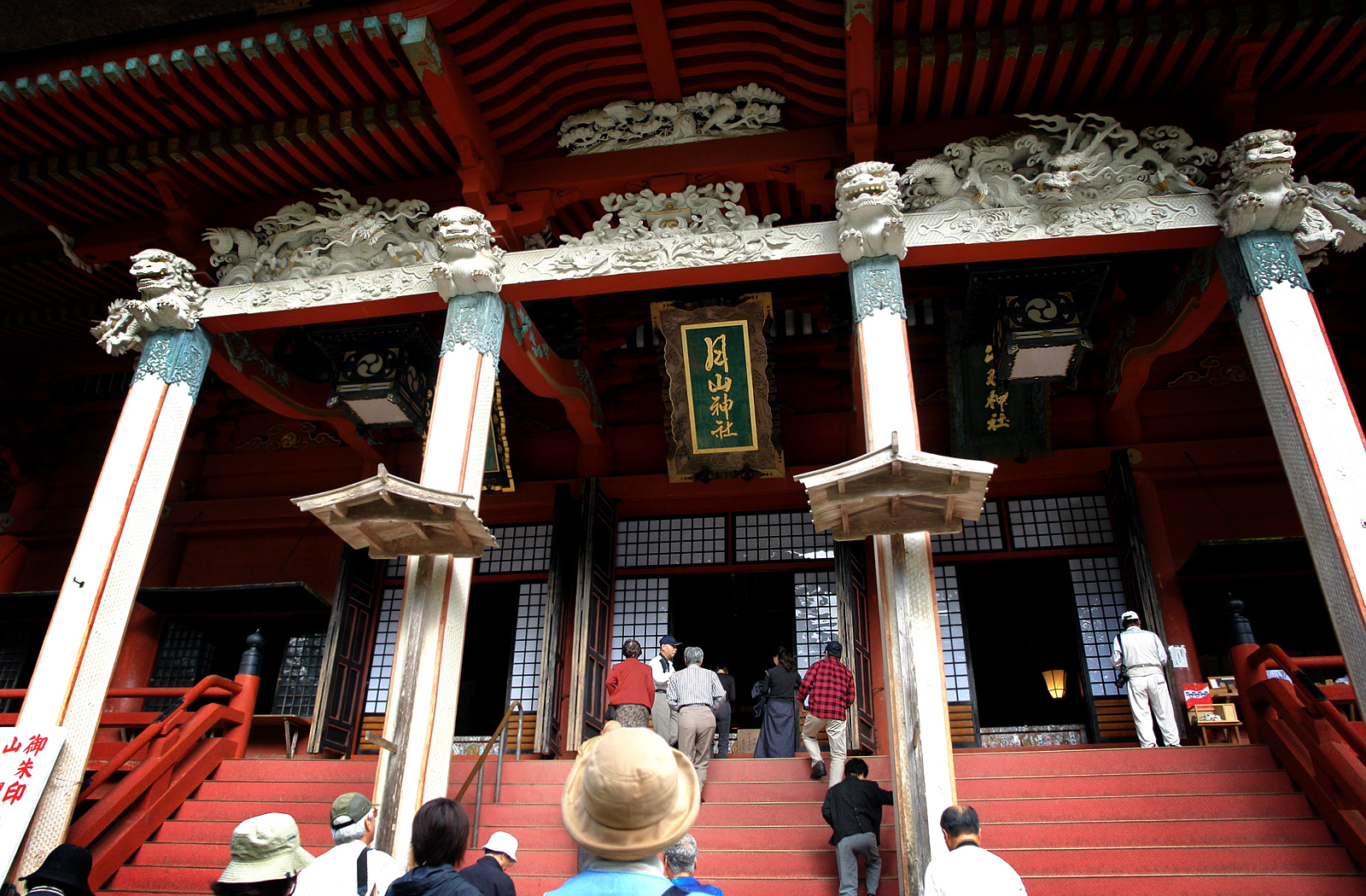
Gosai-den-haiden

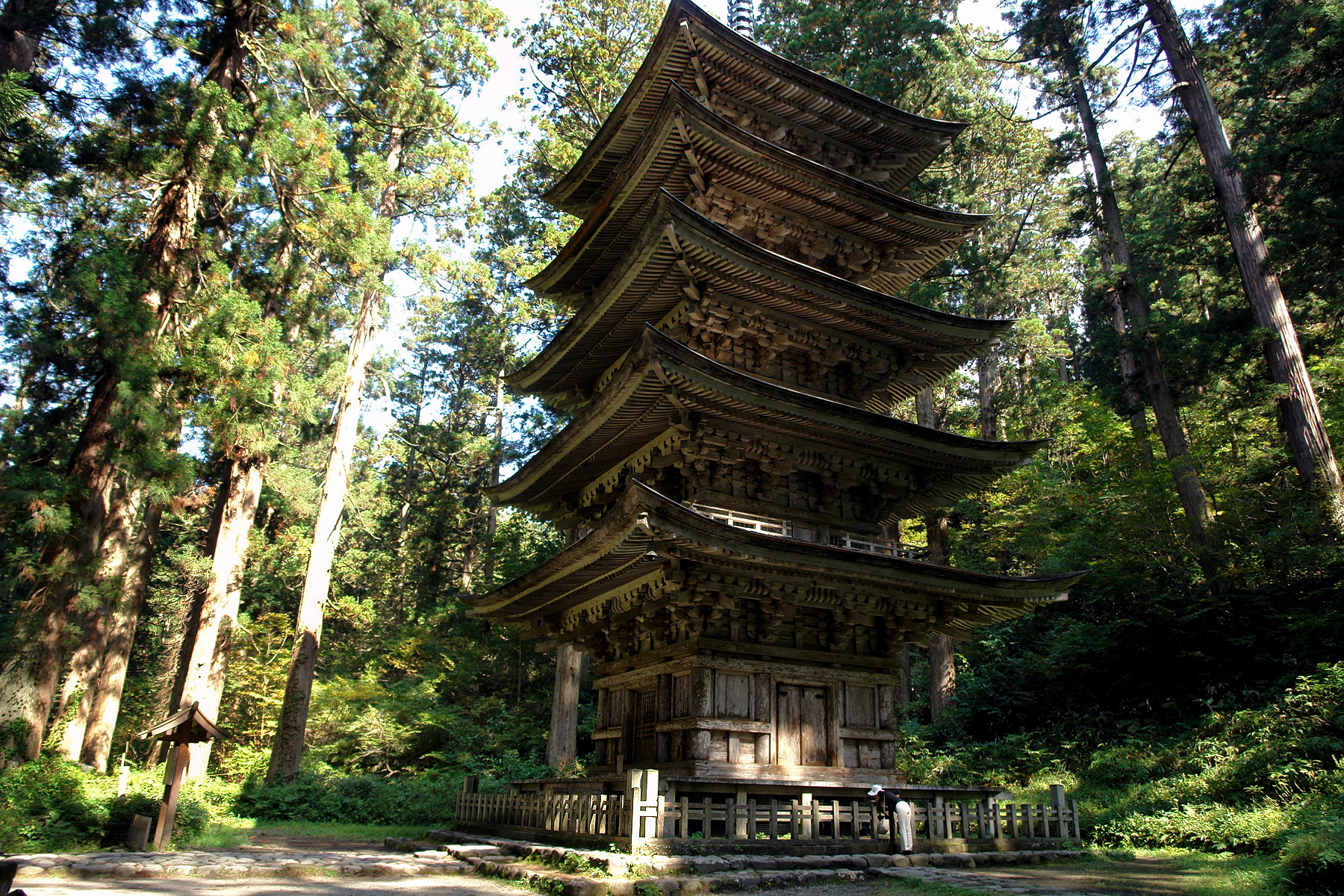
Gojū-tō

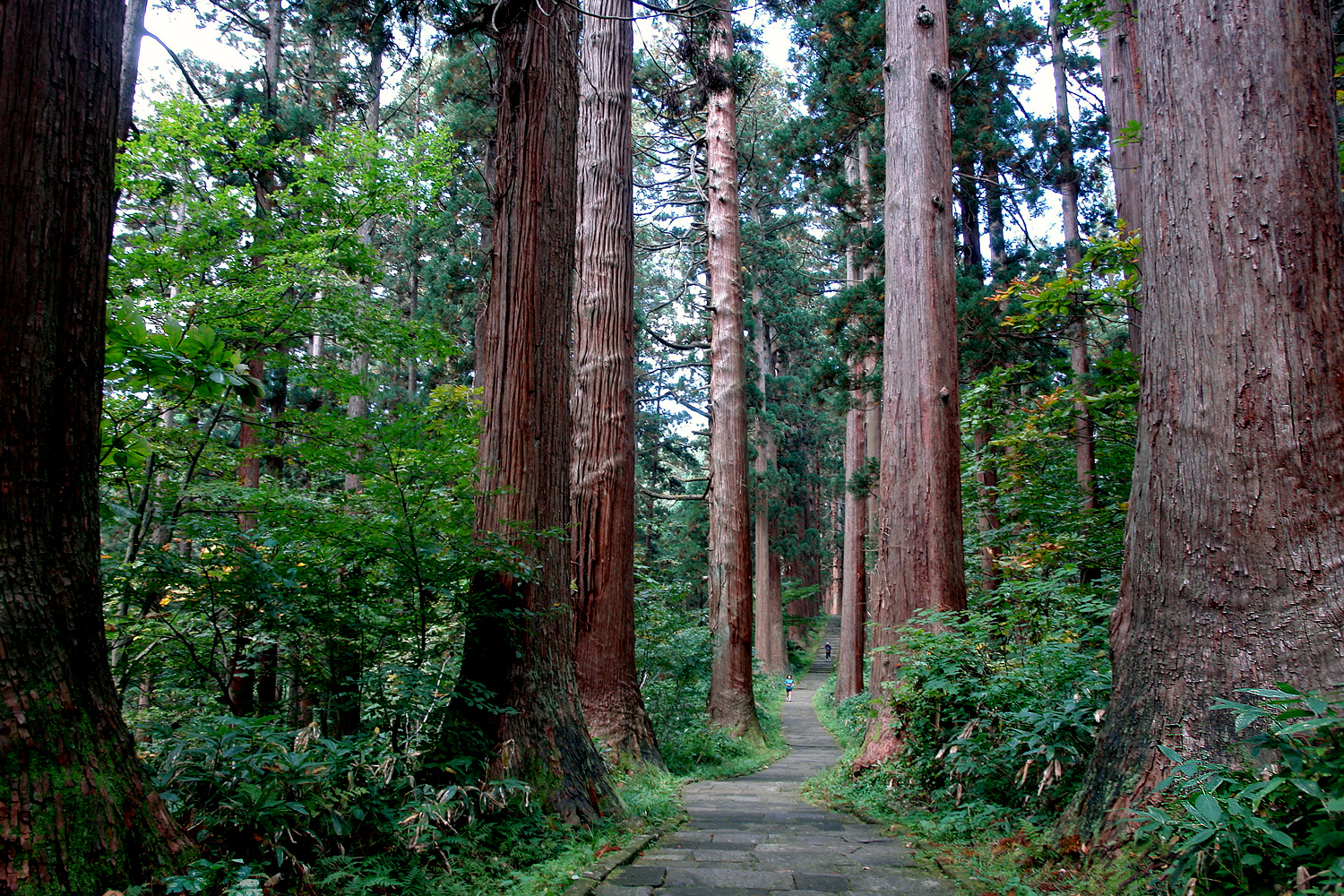
The path to the summit

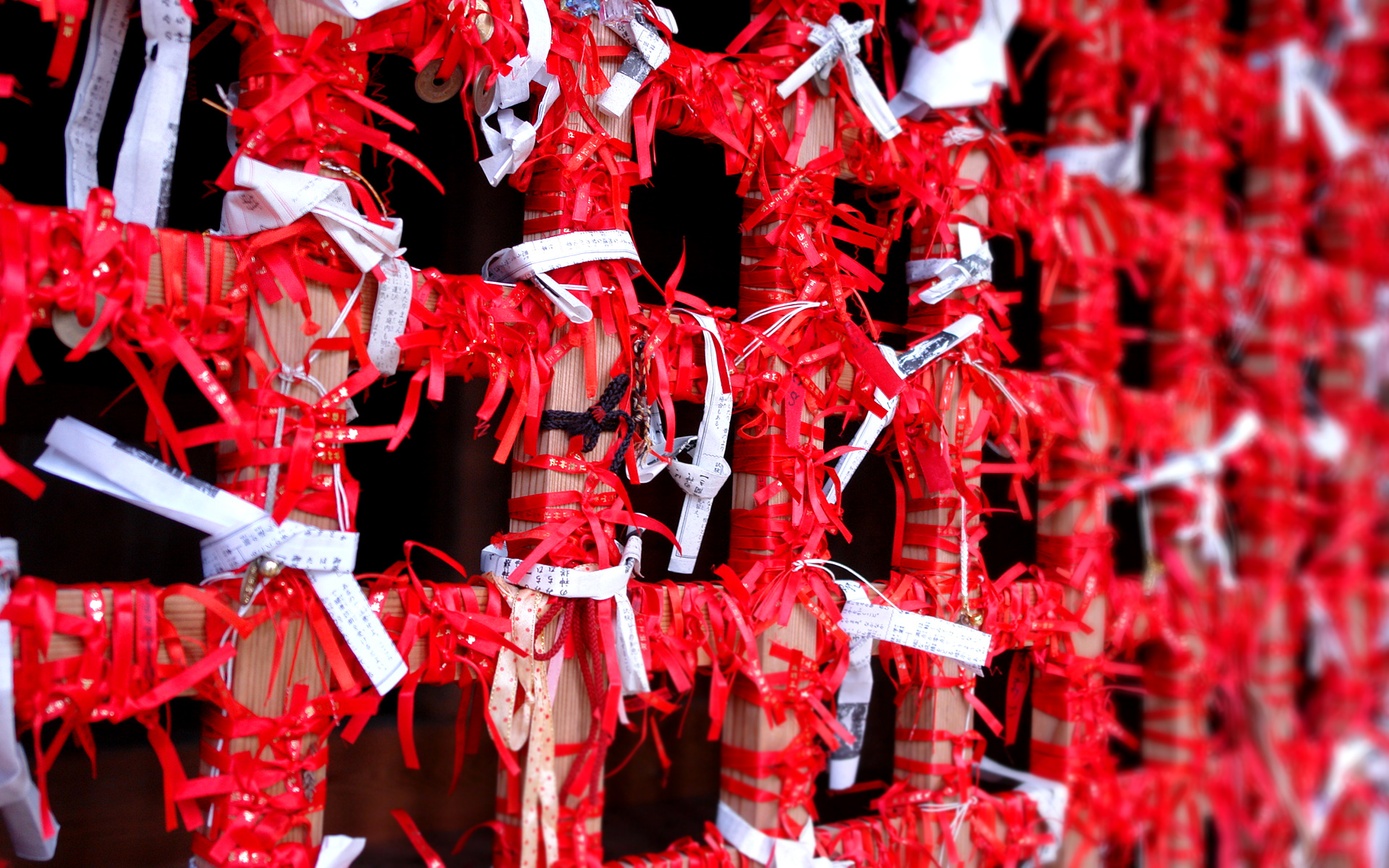
Haniyamahime-jinja

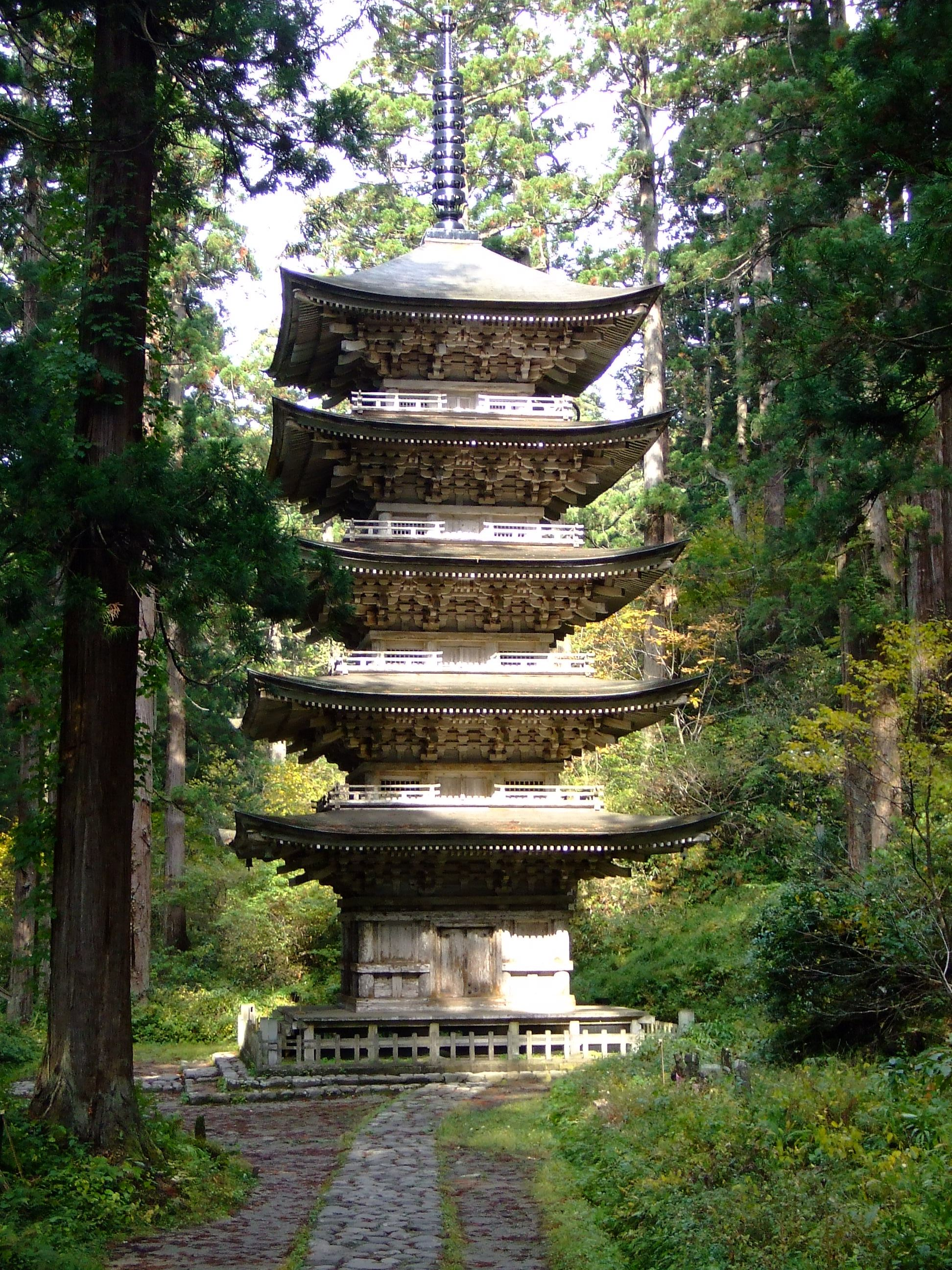
The Gojū-tō Pagoda, near the base of Mount Haguro

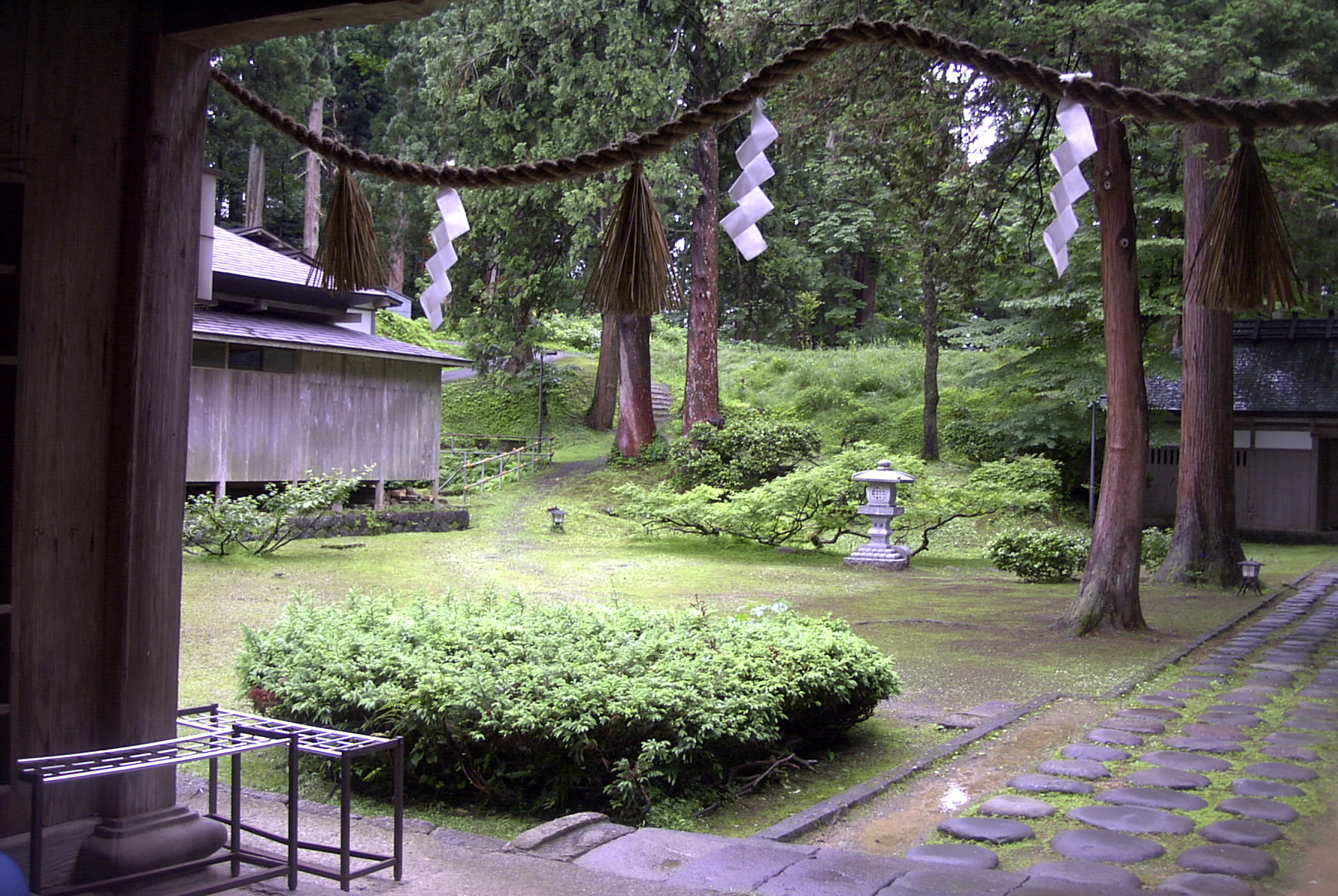
The grounds of the Saikan lodgings.

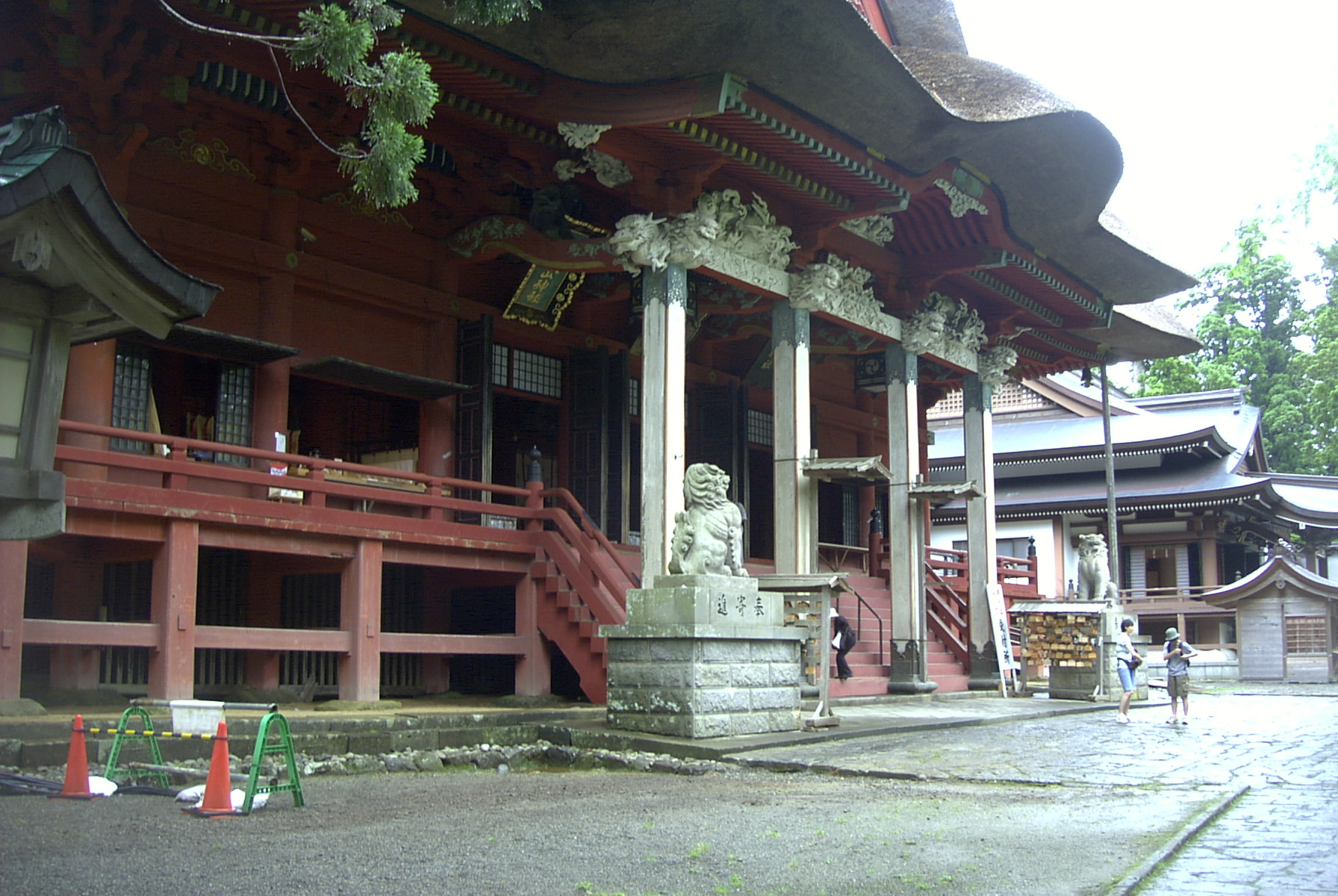
A temple at the top of Mount Haguro.

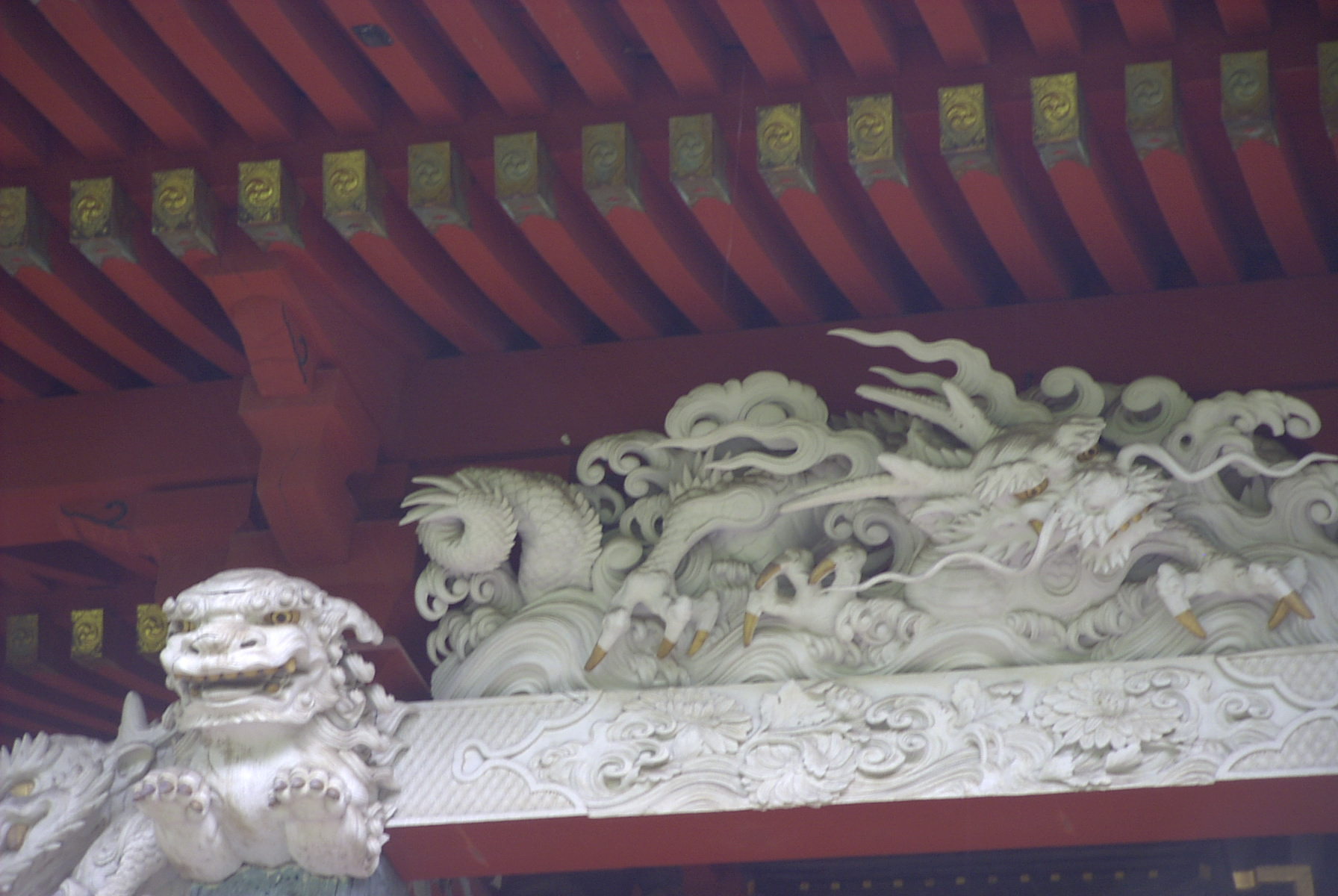
Detailed engraving work atop a temple.

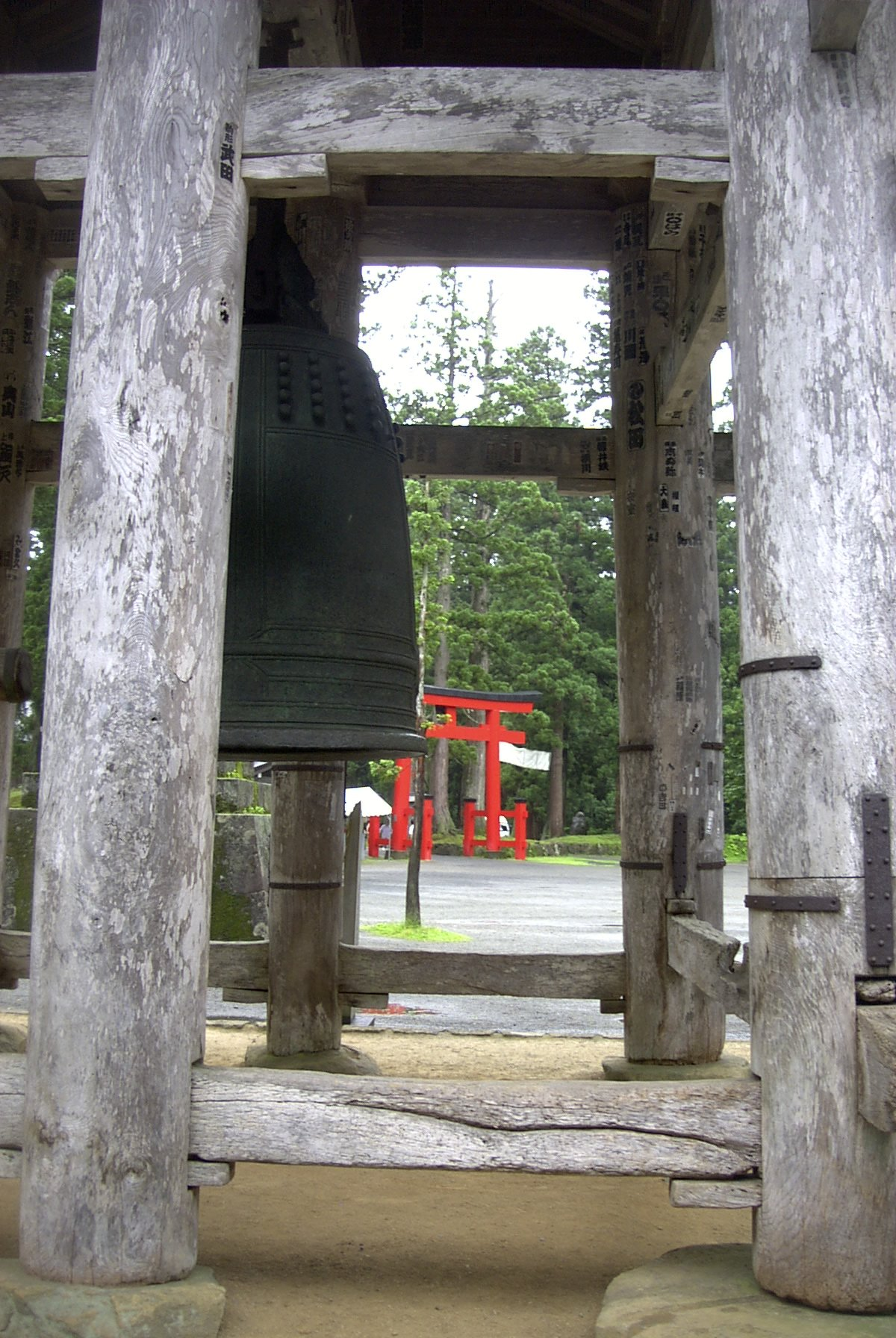
Bell and torii

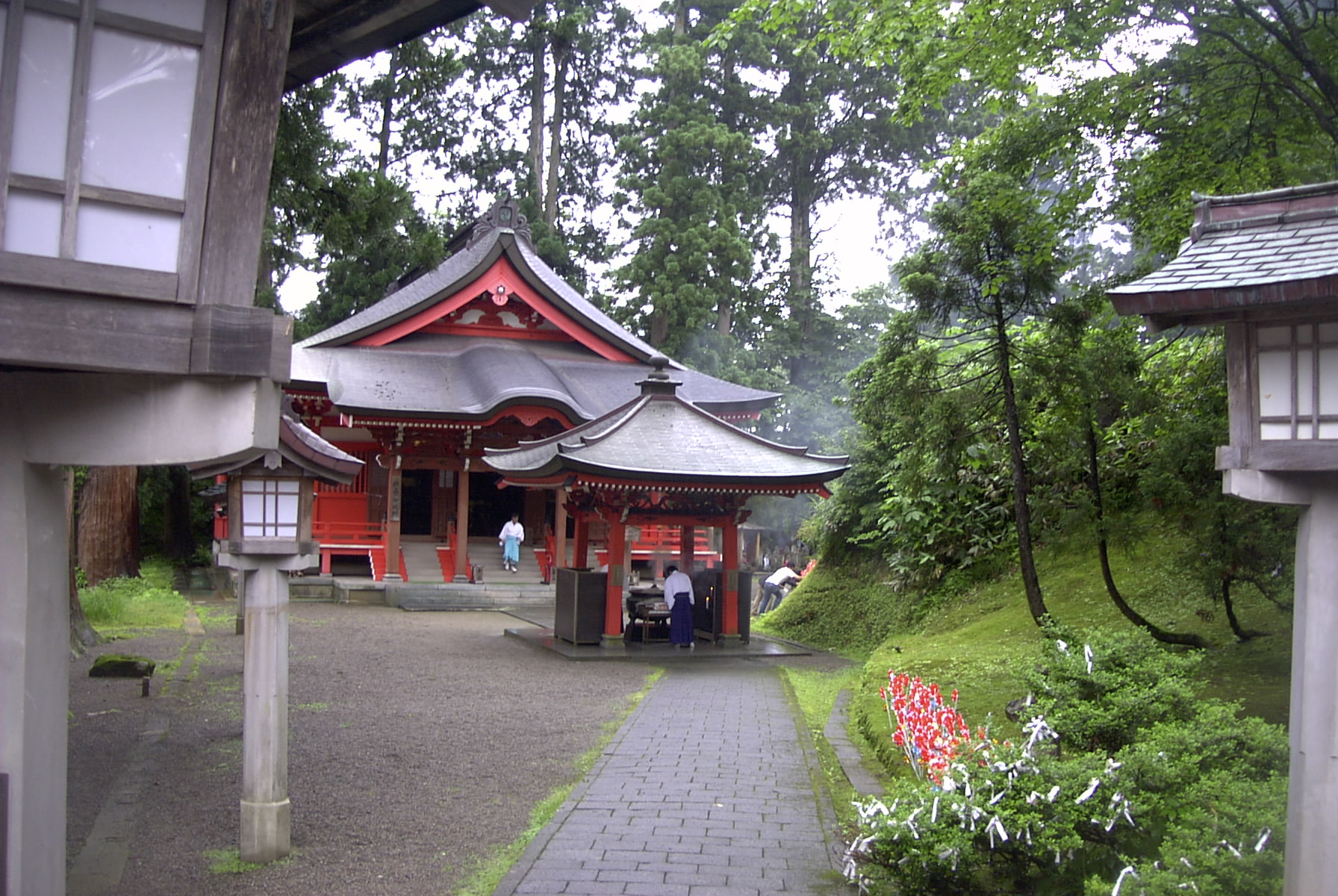
Incense

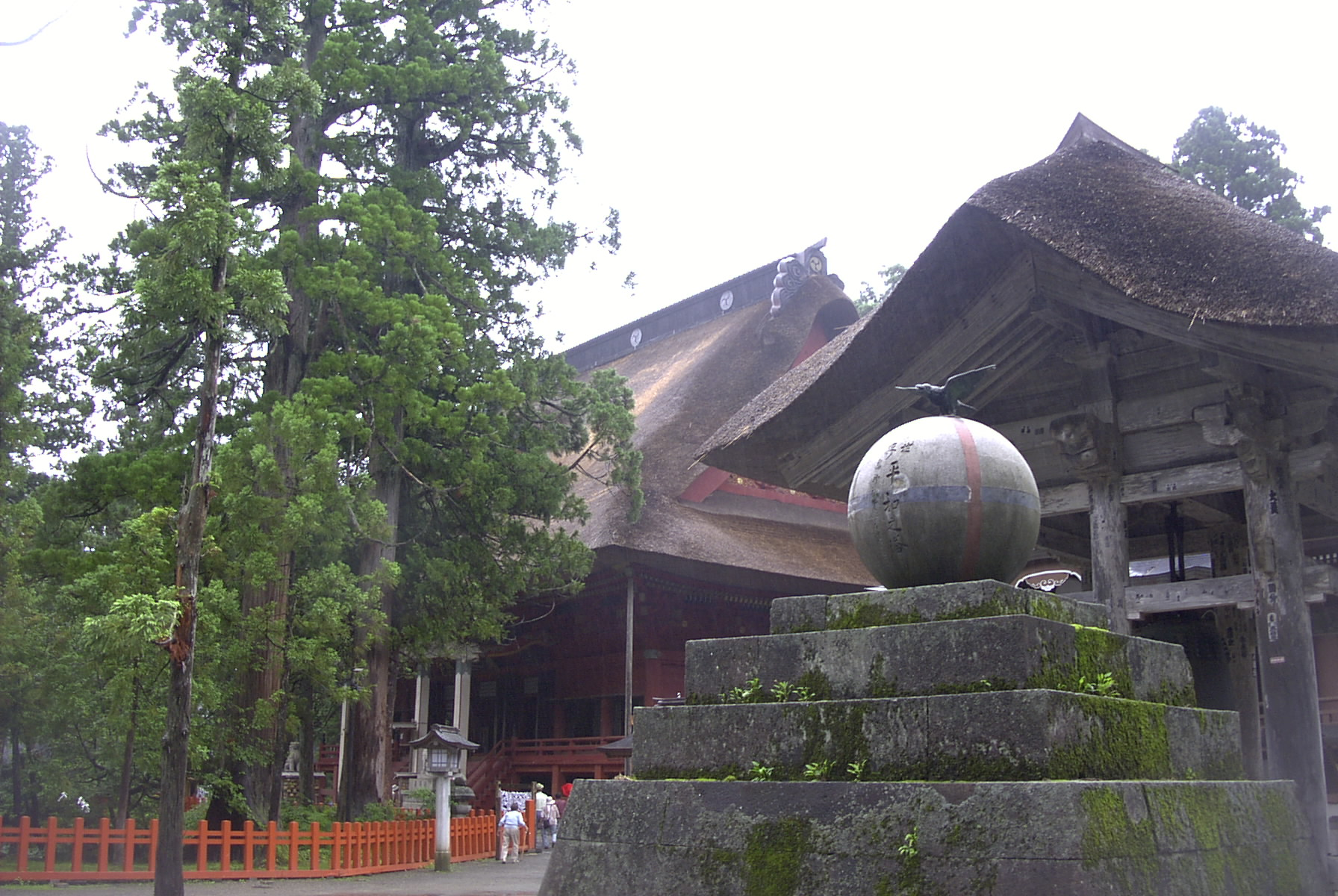
Sculpture

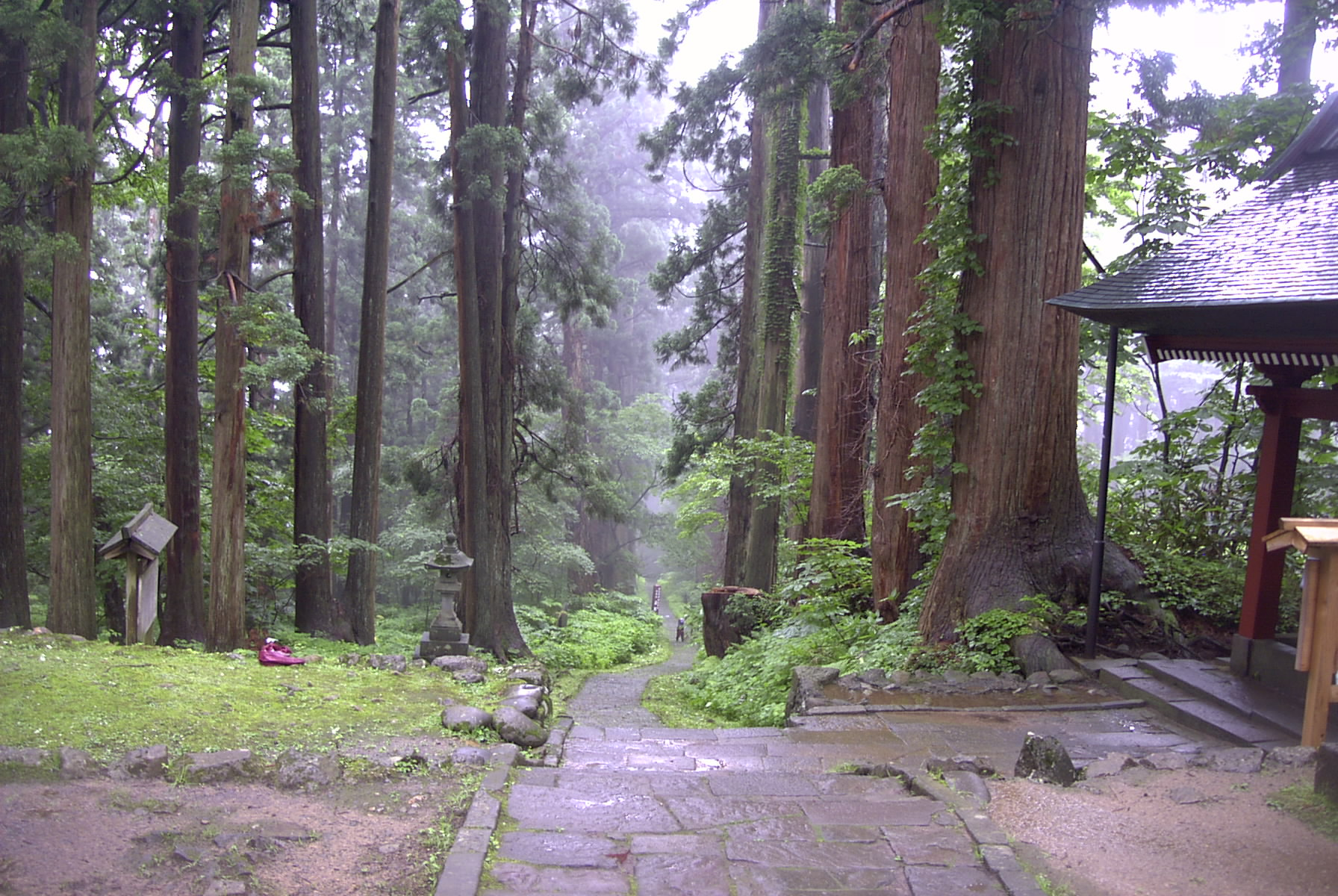
The path to the summit
