= Haguroyama =

Haguroyama (羽黒山) may refer to:

- Haguroyama Masaji, a sumo wrestler who rose to yokozuna
- Haguroyama Sojō, a sumo wrestler and son-in-law of the former
- Mount Haguro (Haguro-san), Yamagata Prefecture, Japan, one of the sacred Three Mountains of Dewa.
