= Mount Yudono =

Stratovolcano on the island of Honshu, Japan

- 湯殿山
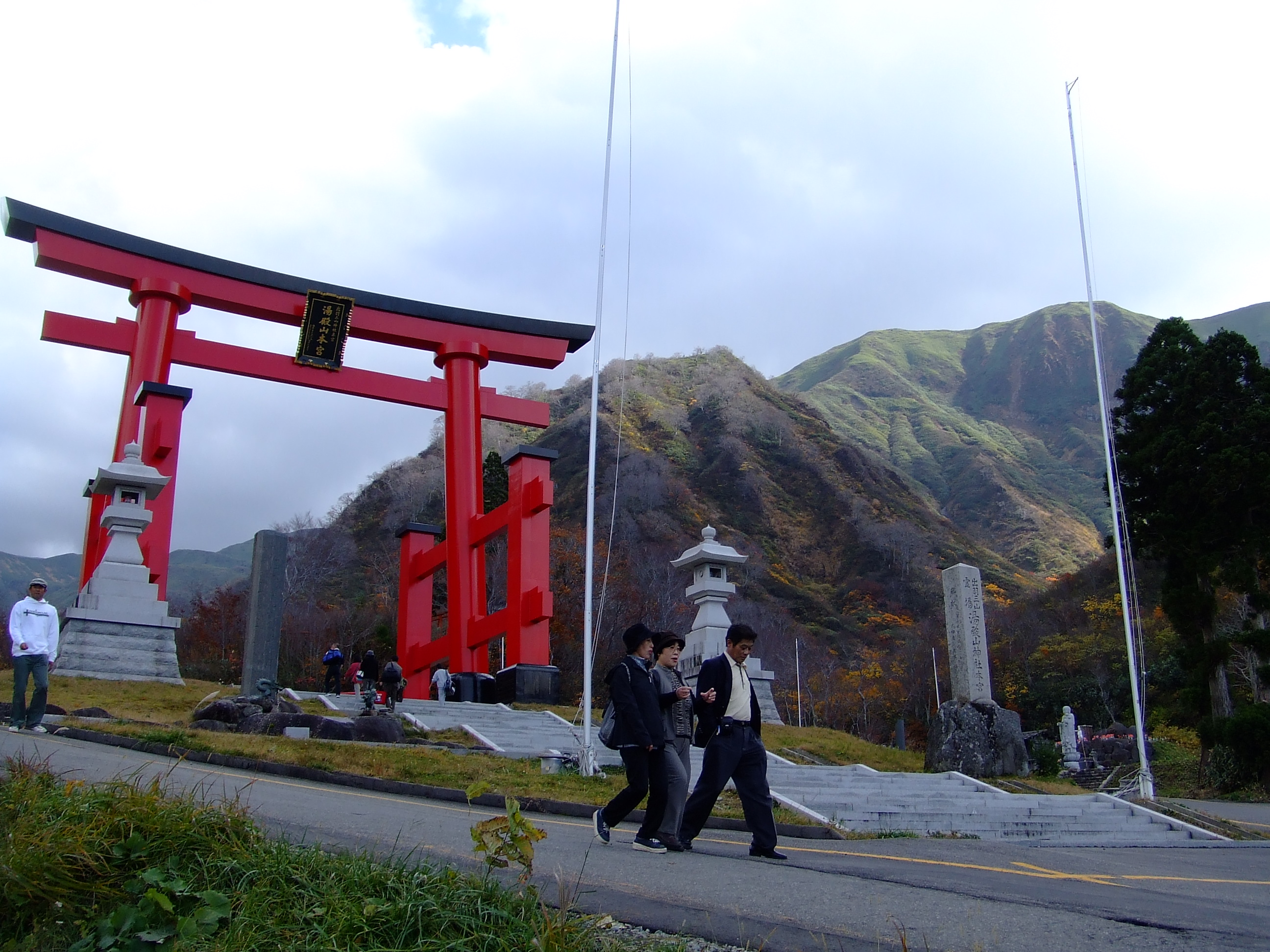
- A torii gate on Mount Yudono

Highest point
- Elevation: 1,500 m (4,900 ft)
- Listing: Three Mountains of Dewa
- Coordinates: 38.530833°N 139.984722°E

Naming
- Language of name: Japanese

Geography
- Location within Yamagata Prefecture
- Location: Yamagata, Tōhoku, Japan

Climbing
- Easiest route: Hiking

Mount Yudono (湯殿山, Yudono-san) is one of the Three Mountains of Dewa in the ancient province of Dewa (modern-day Yamagata Prefecture). The Yudonosan Shrine, the most holy of the Dewa Sanzan shrines, is located on the mountain.

Pilgrims have to enter the shrine itself barefoot, and photography is not allowed. Due to heavy winter snowfall, the mountain and shrine are inaccessible for long periods of the year.
