= Mount Gassan =

Stratovolcano on the island of Honshu, Japan

- 月山
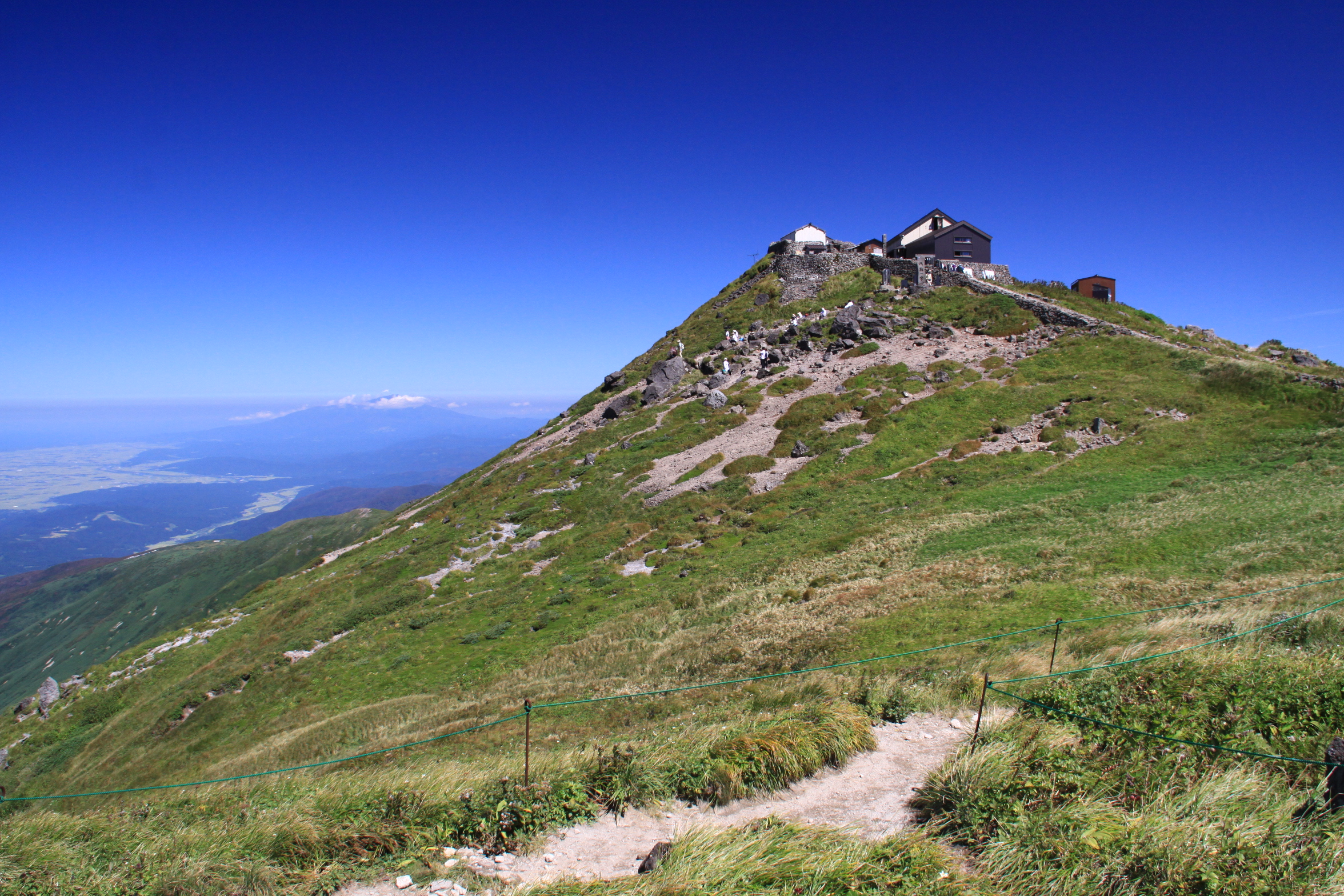
- The summit and Gassan Shrine

Highest point
- Elevation: 1,984 m (6,509 ft)
- Prominence: 1,487 m (4,879 ft)
- Listing: 100 Famous Japanese Mountains Three Mountains of Dewa; Ribu
- Coordinates: 38°32′56″N 140°01′37″E

Naming
- English translation: Moon Mountain
- Language of name: Japanese

Geography
- Location within Yamagata Prefecture
- Location: Yamagata, Tōhoku, Japan

Geology
- Mountain type: Stratovolcano

Climbing
- Easiest route: Hiking

Mount Gassan (月山, Gassan) is a stratovolcano in the ancient province of Dewa (modern-day Yamagata prefecture) and the highest of the Three Mountains of Dewa. The Gassan Shrine stands at the mountain's summit, 1,984 metres (6,509 ft) above sea level.

The hike from its trailhead to the summit usually requires about 4-5 hours and can be challenging. Visitors should be aware of the weather and not try to hike it on days with wind or heavy rain. The trail is not paved and in some parts requires the use of hands to navigate certain parts of the trail.

Due to heavy winter snowfall, the mountain and shrine are inaccessible for long periods of the year; however, this also means that skiing is possible on the mountain from April to mid-summer.

The mountain is interesting in that it contains elements of both shield volcanoes as well as stratovolcanoes, although it is classified as a stratovolcano.

== Gallery ==
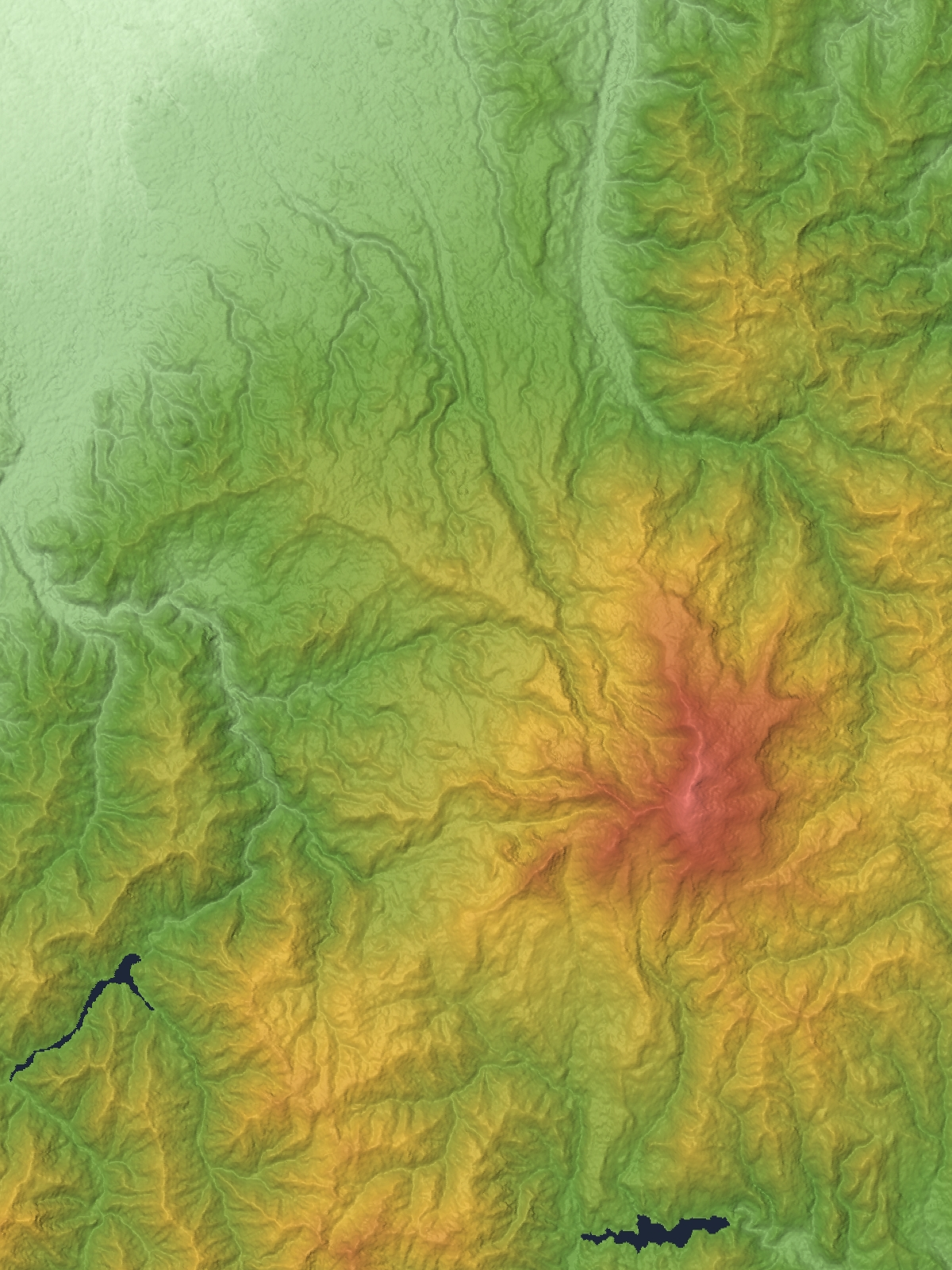
Relief Map

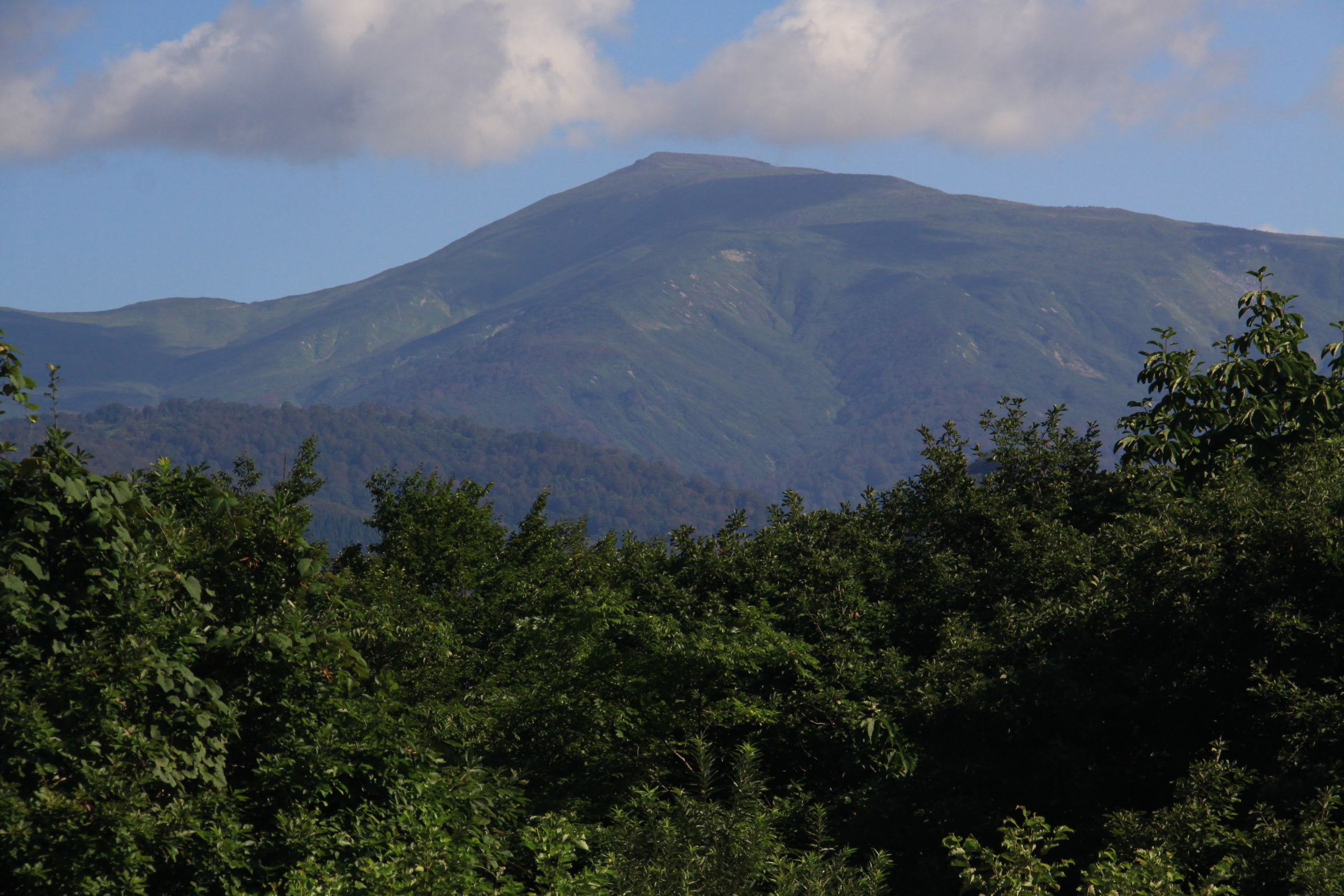
Viewed from the South

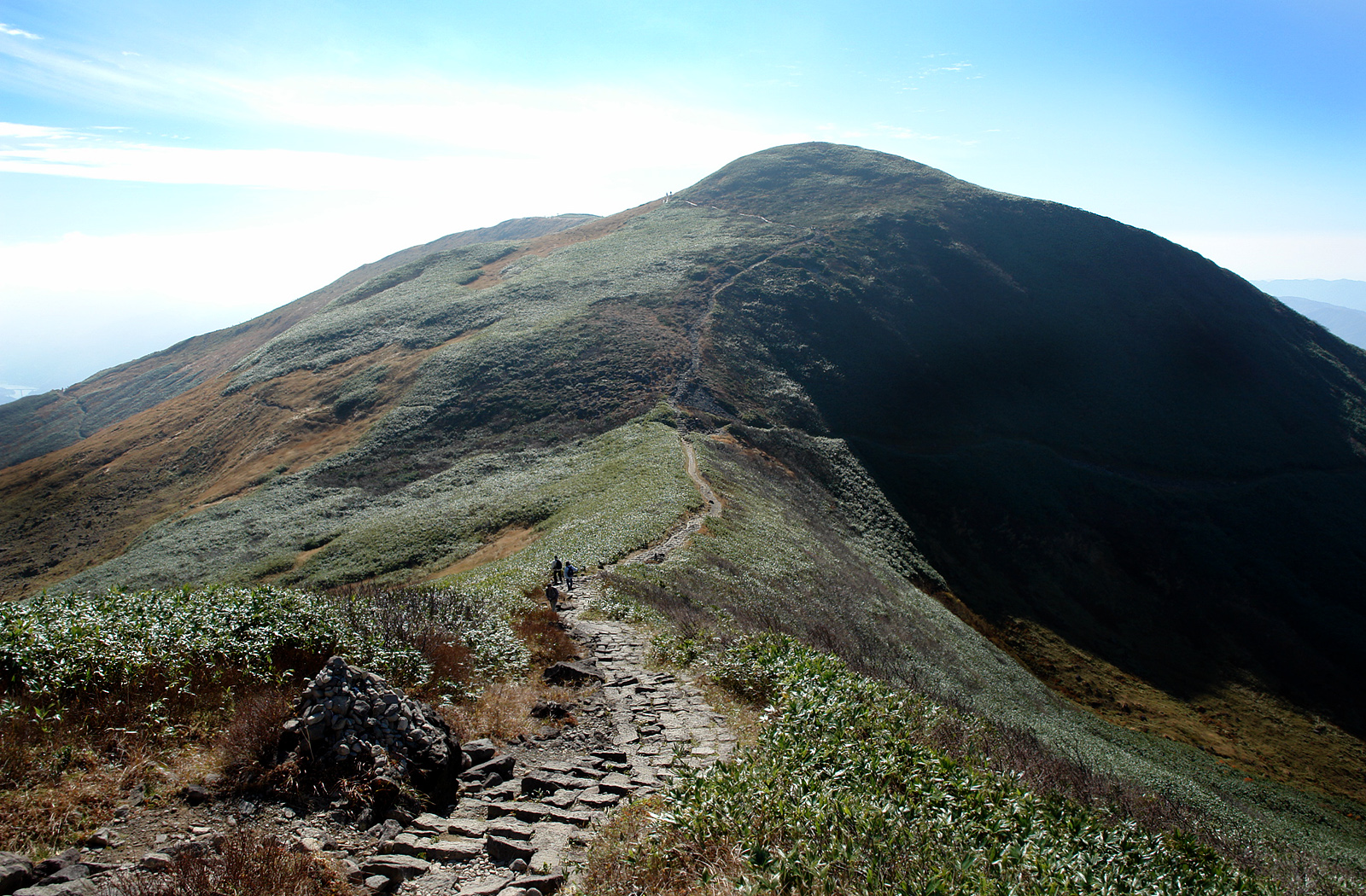
Ridge

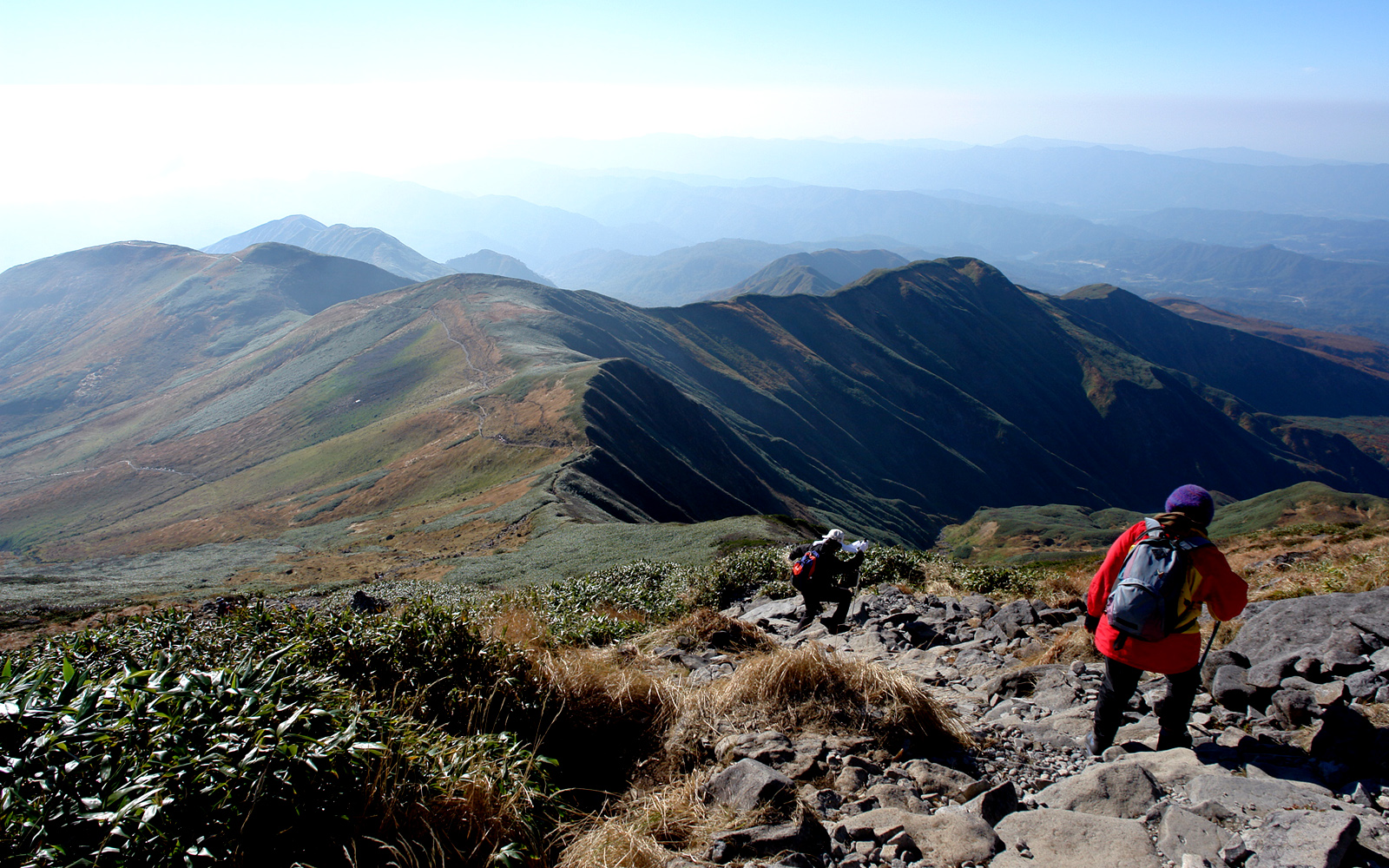
Ridge

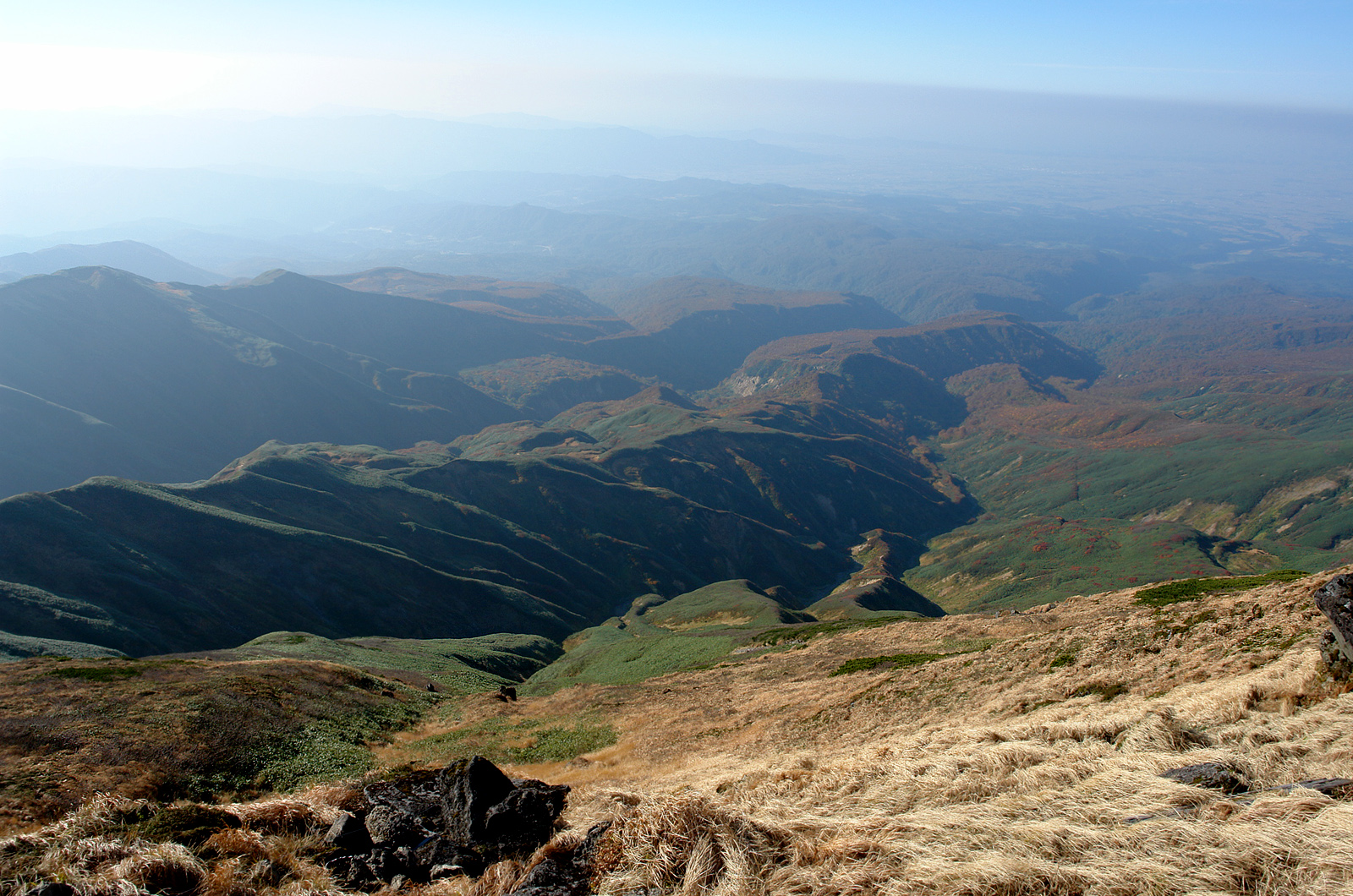
Viewed from the Peak

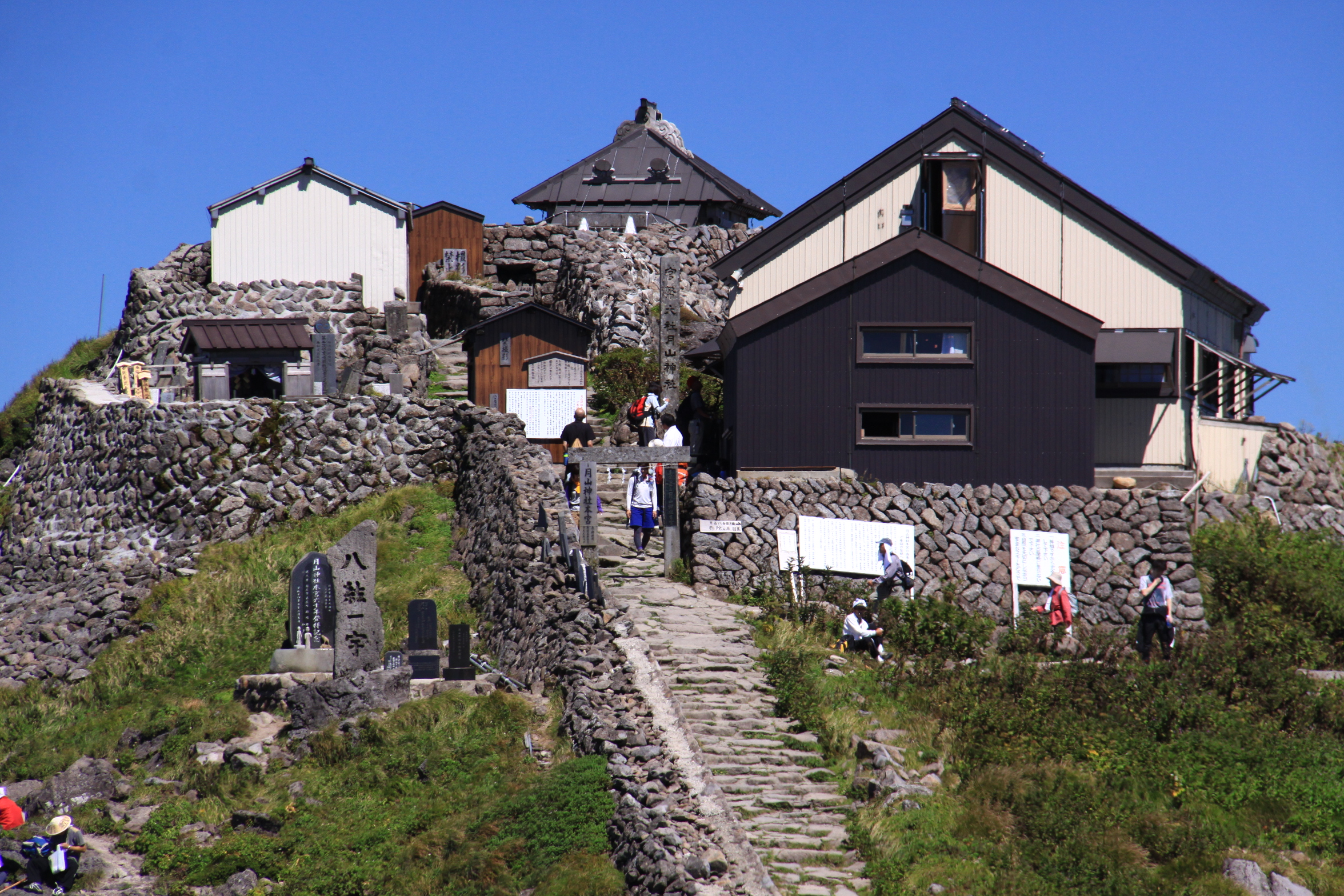
Gassan Shrine at the summit

== See also ==
- List of volcanoes in Japan
- List of mountains in Japan
