= Haguro Station =

Haguro Station (羽黒駅) is the name of two train stations in Japan:

- Haguro Station (Aichi)
- Haguro Station (Ibaraki)
