= Yudonosan Shrine =

Mountain and shrine in Yamagata Prefecture, Japan

Mount Yudono (湯殿山, Yudono-san)
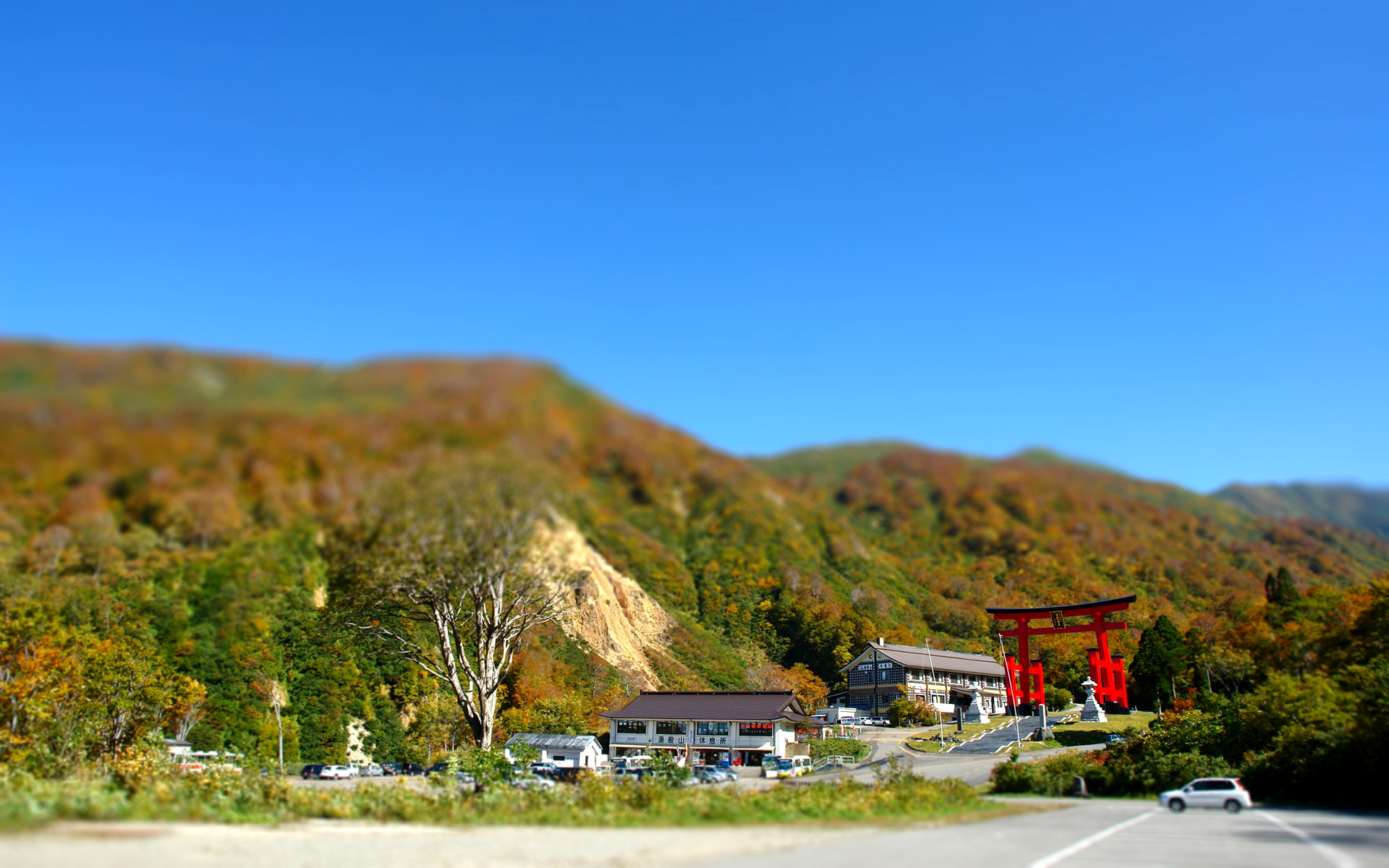
- Mount Yudono shrine Entrance

- Location within Japan

Religion
- Affiliation: Shinto

Location
- Coordinates: 38°31′55″N 139°59′06″E

Yudonosan Shrine (湯殿山神社) is an important Beppyo shrine and one of the Three Mountains of Dewa. The shrine is unique in that it has no main building, but instead uses the mountain itself as a Kannabi, or a rock as an Iwakura. It is located in a valley between Mount Yudono and Shinakurasan Mountain.

Yudonosan is the final destination in the Shugendo pilgrimage between all the mountains and is also associated with meeting potential spouses. The mountain itself, Mount Yudono, is highly regarded as a training ground for ascetic discipline, and many yamabushi and ascetics believe that their pilgrimage is not complete until they reach the summit of Mount Yudono. The mountain is known for its goshintai, a sacred object believed to be connected to a god., and they use an Iwakura rock as a shintai. The shrine on Mount Yudono is regarded as holy ground and is kept secret, with photography and video recordings being strictly prohibited even today. It is impossible to enter the shrine in winter due to heavy snow.

== Gallery ==
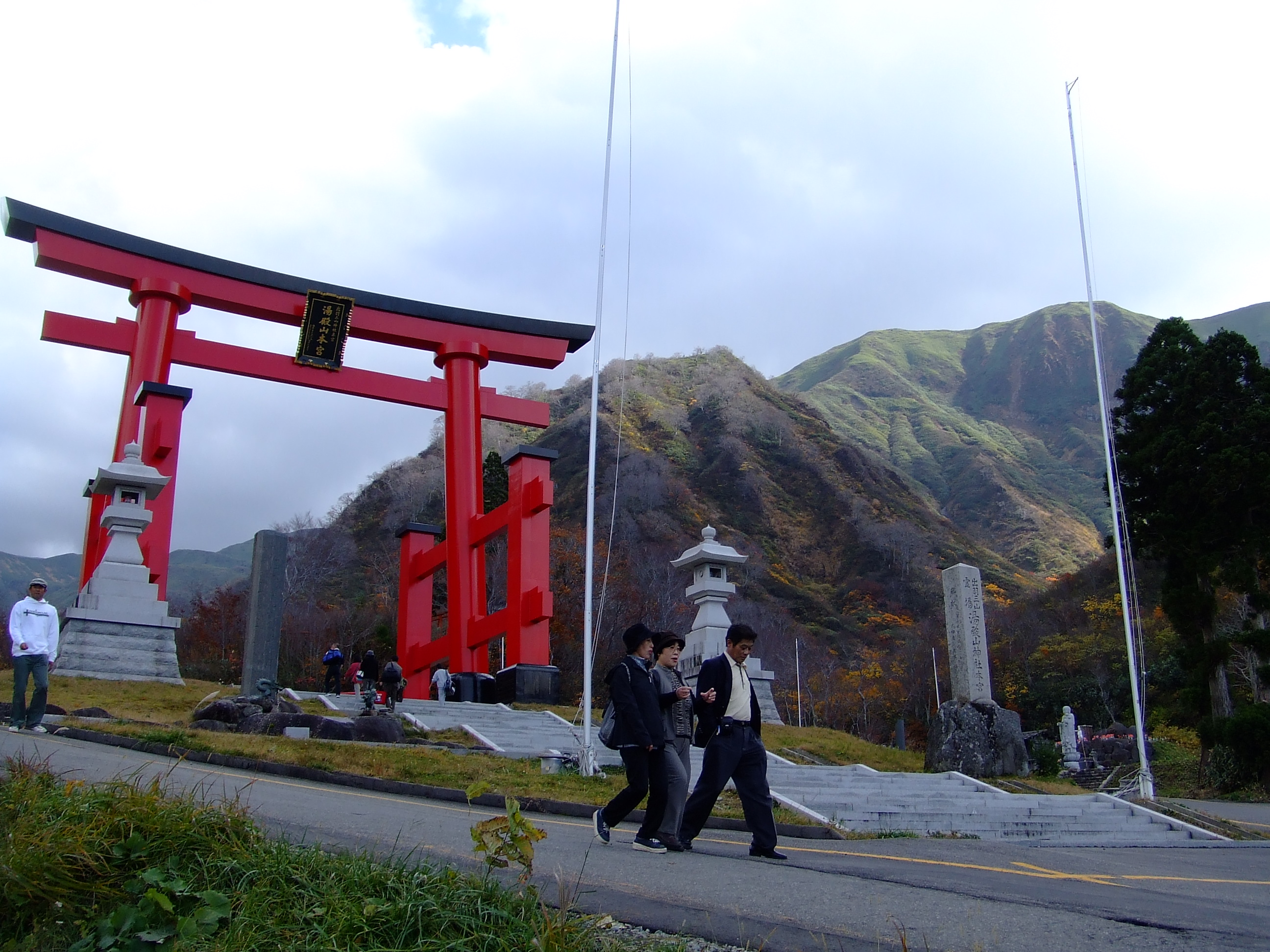
The torii gate at the entrance to the Mount Yudono shrine.

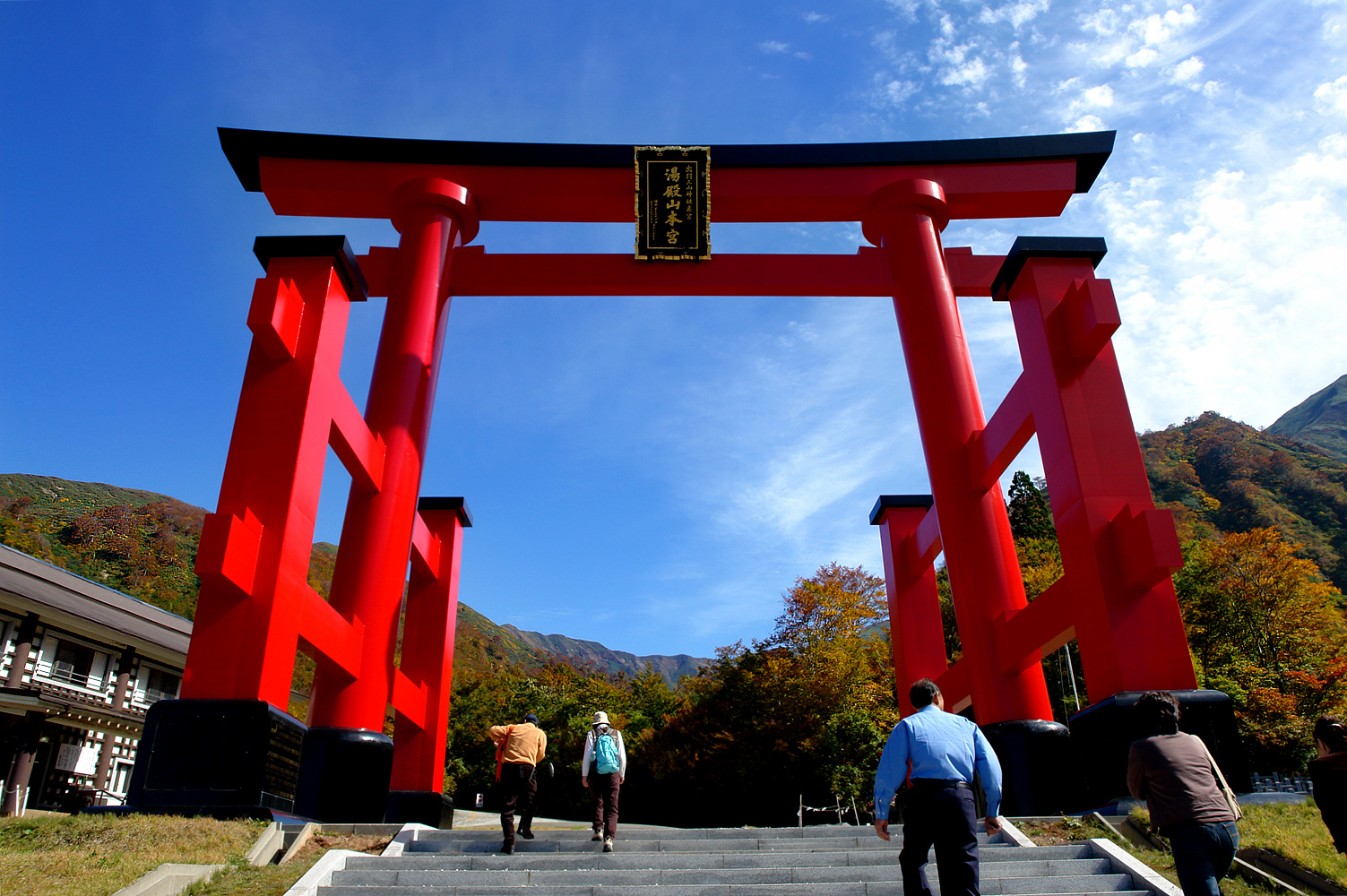
The torii gate front

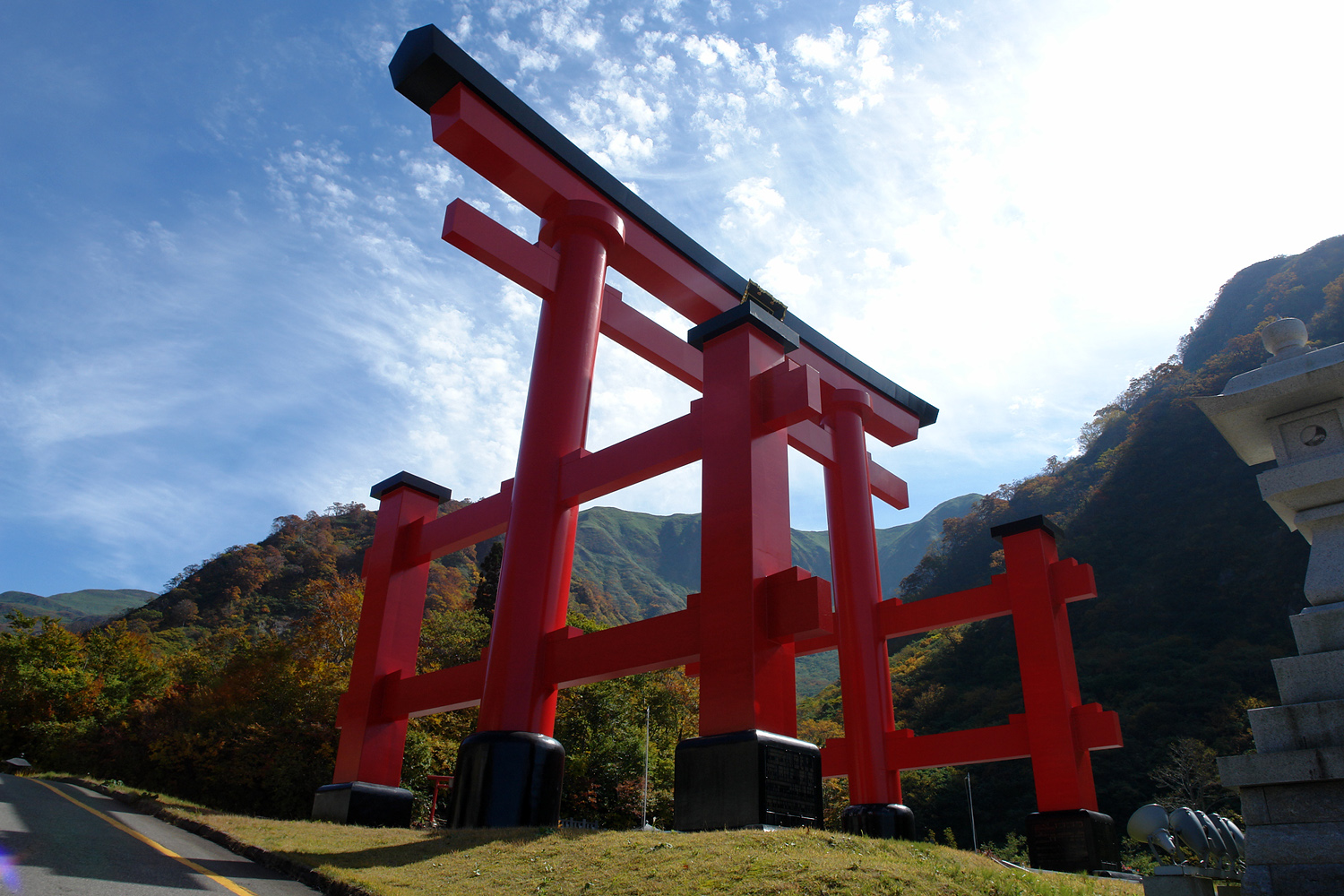
The torii gate
