= Gassan Shrine =

Shinto shrine in Yamagata Prefecture, Japan

Gassan Shrine (月山神社, Gassan jinja)
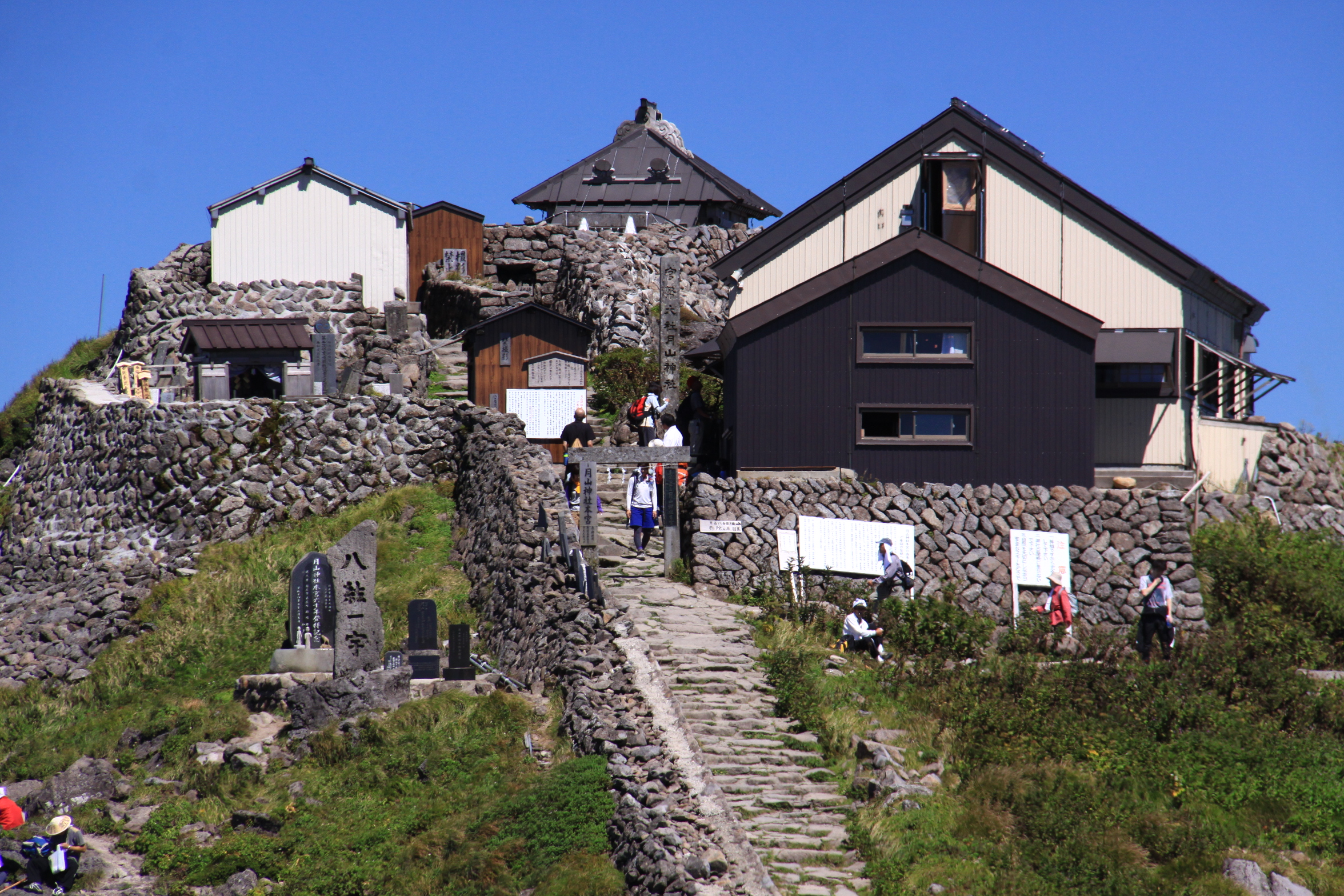
- Gassan Shrine

- Location within Japan

Religion
- Affiliation: Shinto
- Deity: Tsukuyomi-no-Mikoto

Location
- Coordinates: 38.5469°N 140.0258°E

Gassan Shrine (月山神社, Gassan jinja) is a Shinto shrine on Mount Gassan in Yamagata Prefecture, Japan. It was formerly a national shrine of the first rank (国幣大社, kokuhei taisha) in the Modern system of ranked Shinto Shrines. The main kami enshrined here is Tsukuyomi-no-Mikoto (月読命), the Shinto moon god. It was established in 593.

The shrine's main festival is held annually on August 14.

Mount Gassan is the tallest of the Three Mountains of Dewa and is famous for its natural scenery and beauty. The kanji for Gassan literally translates to "Moon Mountain". It is home to many rare alpine plants and other marsh vegetation. The hiking path to the peak of Mt. Gassan is the second-highest point in the Shonai Region of Japan. However, due to heavy snowfall, the mountain is usually accessible only from late spring to early fall.

== See also ==
- Mount Gassan
- Three Mountains of Dewa
- Chōkai gassan ryōsho-gu
- Fujisan Hongū Sengen Taisha
