= Three Mountains of Dewa =

Mountains in Yamagata Prefecture, Japan

Three Mountains of Dewa (出羽三山, Dewa Sanzan)
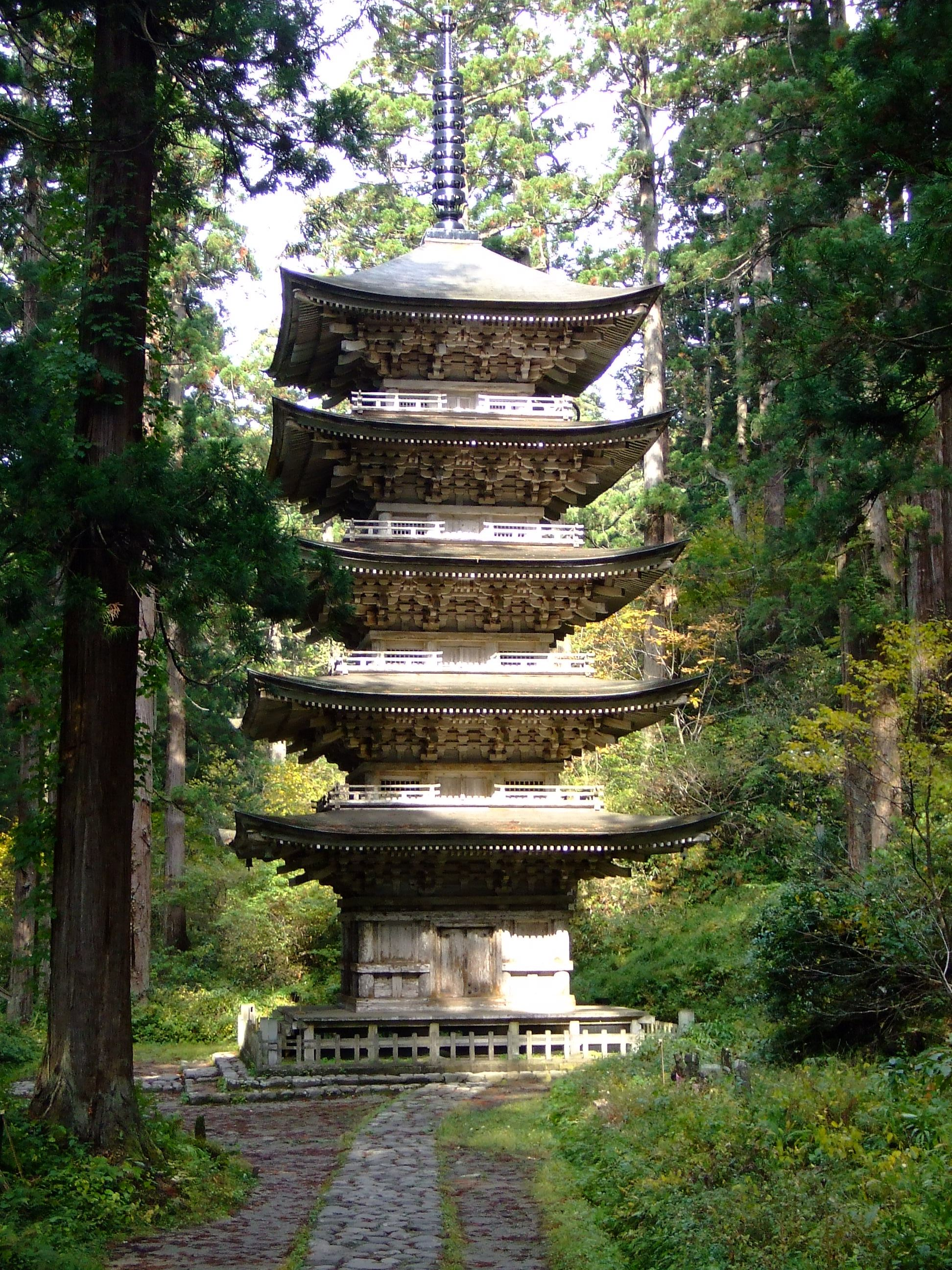
- The five story pagoda near the base of Mount Haguro

- Location within Japan

Religion
- Affiliation: Shinto

Location
- Coordinates: 38°42′01″N 140°00′01″E

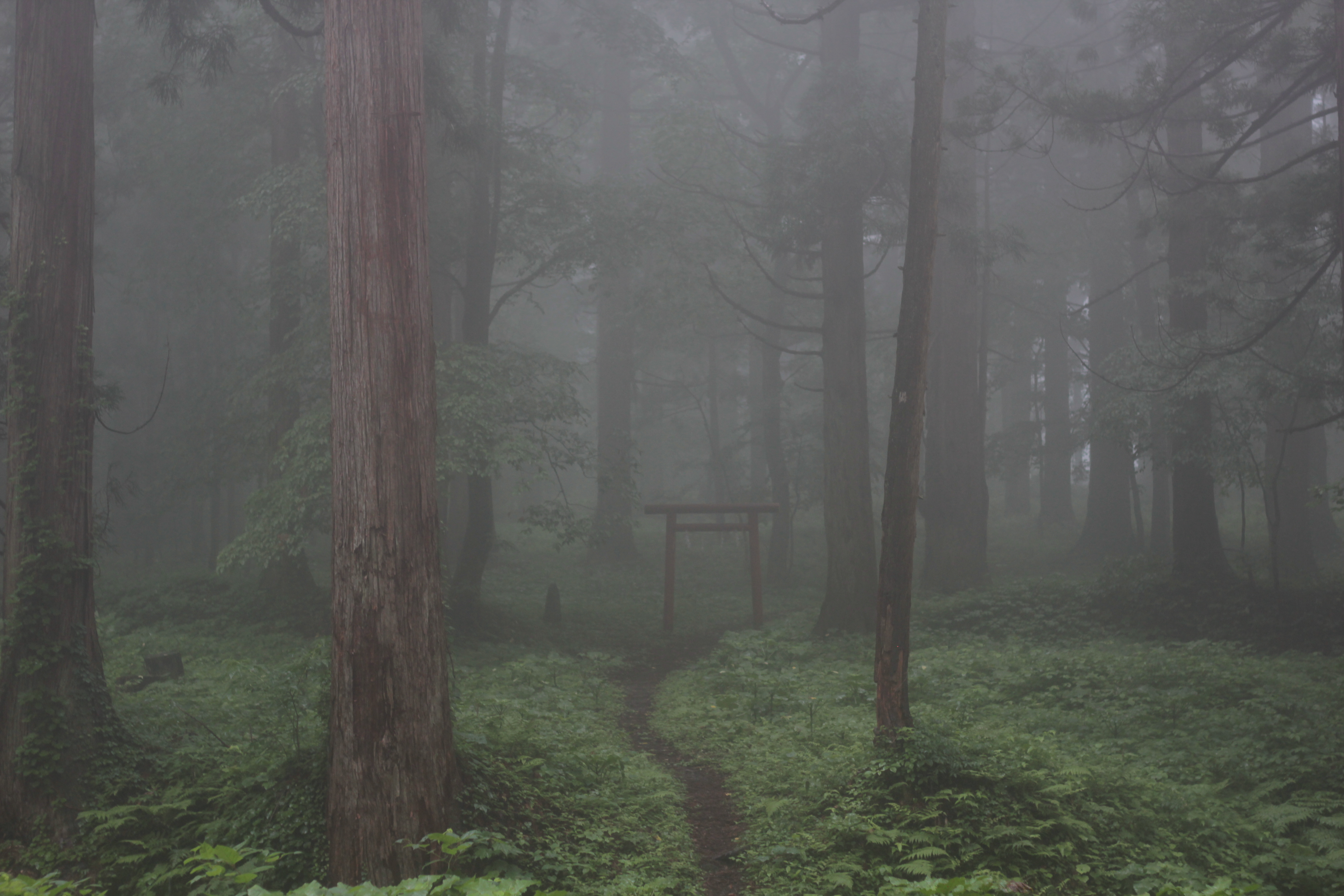
A torii gate halfway up on Mount Haguro.

The Three Mountains of Dewa (出羽三山, Dewa Sanzan) refer to the three sacred mountains of Mount Haguro, Mount Gassan and Mount Yudono, which are clustered together in the ancient province of Dewa (modern-day Yamagata Prefecture). Holy to the Japanese Shinto religion and especially the mountain ascetic practice of Shugendo, Dewa Sanzan are a popular pilgrimage site visited by many, including famed haiku poet Matsuo Bashō.

The Haguro Five-story Pagoda is a recognised national treasure of Japan.

It has three subshrines

1. Mount Gassan with Gassan Shrine
2. Mount Haguro with Hagurosan Shrine
3. Mount Yudono with Yudonosan Shrine

== History ==
The Dewa Sanzan mountains are particularly noteworthy as having the oldest history of mountain worship in Japan. The mountains were first opened as a religious centre over 1400 years ago in 593 by prince Hachiko, who was the first-born son of Emperor Sushun, the 32nd emperor of Japan and reigning emperor at the time. Prince Hachiko arrived in Dewa province in 593 after fleeing the Soga clan upon the assassination of his father. He then devoted the rest of his life to religious pursuits, eventually enduring difficult ascetic exercises and a period of penance, which led to his worship of Haguro Gongen, the deity of the mountain. Following this, the prince began worship at the Gassan and Yudono mountains, which led to the enshrinement of all three deities at the temple located on the summit of Mount Haguro.

Following the establishment of the Dewa Sanzan mountains as a center of ascetic religious beliefs, many people began to make yearly pilgrimages to the mountains to pay reverence, even arduously trekking thousands of miles to visit the shrines during the summer months. These pilgrimages held significance to many religions and the mountains served as a place of learning for various belief systems, but were most particularly important to shugendō. Several notable individuals made this pilgrimage to the Dewa Sanzan to include En no Gyōja, the founder of shugendō asceticism, as well as Kūkai, the founder of the Shingon Sect.

Following the Meiji Restoration in 1868, the Japanese government dissolved the pattern of Shintō-Buddhist amalgamation and Shintō was selected as the official state religion. Shugendō was adversely affected by this split and many shugendō priests returned to a secular life. Following the end of World War II however, shugendō was allowed to enjoy a status as a minor religious group. These changes in religious association also altered the designation of the shrines located on the Dewa Sanzan. In the Empire of Japan, Hagurosan Shrine and Yudonosan Shrine were designated as kokuhei shosha, while Gassan Shrine on Mount Gassan was considered a kanpei taisha. Today all three are considered equal Beppyo shrines

== Significance in Japanese religion ==
Folk religion has continued throughout the ages to be a standard part of the daily lives of the Japanese people, particularly the aspect of the association between religious beliefs and practices with sacred mountains. This practice of mountain worship holds a significant place in Japanese beliefs and had become widespread throughout Japan's history. It has been observed that nearly every high mountain top has had its own dedicated shrine at one point, with some receiving pilgrimages every year from thousands of worshippers. This collection of diverse phenomena linking religious activities and beliefs with sacred mountains is referred to as sangaku shinkō.

The Dewa Sanzan are very holy to both the religions of Shintō and Buddhism, but in particular are very significant and sacred to the shugendō religious system of beliefs, as they represent great spiritual significance. Mount Haguro, Mount Gassan, and Mount Yudono each have their own shrine, though the primary shrine itself, Dewa Shrine, is located at the summit of Mount Haguro. The primary shrine is unique in that it venerates all three sacred mountains.

Every year, mountain ascetic devotees known as yamabushi - which are laymen practitioners of shugendo - pay reverence to the Dewa Sanzan. Mount Haguro is significant in this role as it serves as the entryway to Mount Gassan and Mount Yudono.

Though Mount Haguro is the smallest of the three mountains, it is the only mountain of Dewa that is accessible all throughout the year, as heavy snowfall prohibits pilgrimage to the other two mountains of Dewa during the winter months. It is the most well known of the three mountains of Dewa both locally and internationally, as it serves as the location of the Haguro Five-story Pagoda, one of Japan's national treasures.

Mount Gassan is the tallest of the three sacred mountains and is well known for its natural scenery and beauty, as it plays host to a variety of rare alpine plants and other marsh vegetation. The hiking path on Mt. Gassan leads all the way to its peak, the second highest point in the Shonai Region of Japan. Due to heavy snow however, it is often only accessible during late spring to the early fall.

Mount Yudono is viewed as being the heart of the three sacred mountains and is considered the most holy of ascetic disciplinary practice grounds. Many ascetics and yamabushi believe they have not completed their pilgrimage, and thus entered the holy land, until they have reached Mount Yudono. Mount Yudono is famous for its goshintai, a sacred object believed to be directly connected to a god. The shrine on Yudono is also revered as hallowed land which must be kept secret, and even today, photography and video recordings are prohibited.

== See also ==
- Dewa Mountains
