= Mount Haguro =

Stratovolcano on the island of Honshu, Japan

- 羽黒山
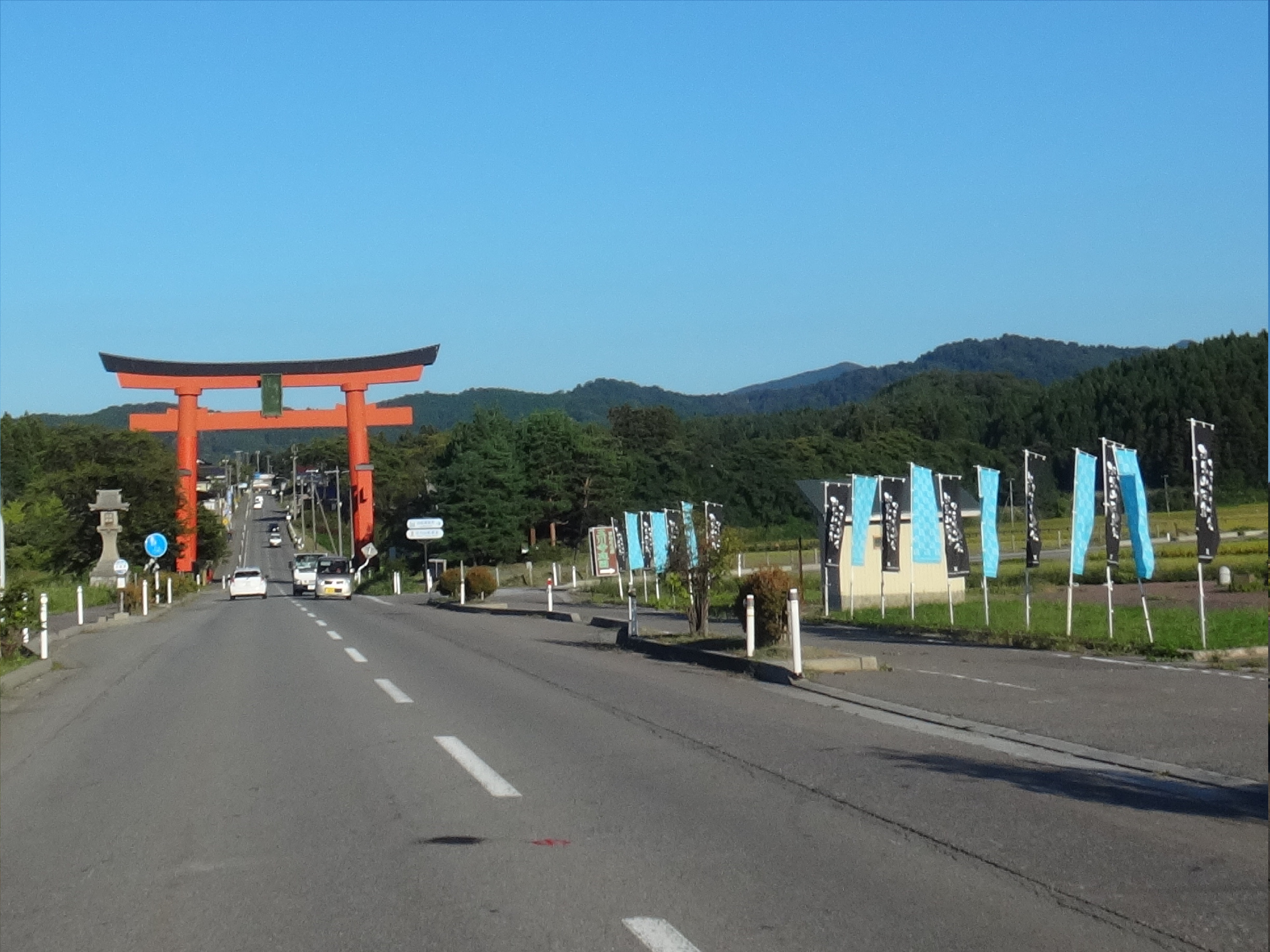
- Mount Haguro as seen from the main torii gate of Dewa Sanzan Jinja

Highest point
- Elevation: 414 m (1,358 ft)
- Listing: Three Mountains of Dewa
- Coordinates: 38.702578°N 139.981875°E

Naming
- Language of name: Japanese

Geography
- Location within Yamagata Prefecture
- Location: Yamagata, Tōhoku, Japan

Climbing
- Easiest route: Hiking

Mount Haguro (羽黒山, Haguro-san) is one of the Three Mountains of Dewa in the city of Tsuruoka, the ancient province of Dewa (a domain consisting of modern-day Yamagata Prefecture and Akita Prefecture), Japan. Dewa Shrine is located on Mount Haguro.

== Access ==
The summit can also be reached by bus service. In addition to religious pilgrims, travellers often stay at the Saikan temple lodging. In the Edo period, there used to be 336 shukubo on the mountain.

Visitors can visit the official english website of the Dewa Sanzan Mountains for updates on the opening and closing of the mountains as well as other access information.

== See also ==
- List of Special Places of Scenic Beauty, Special Historic Sites and Special Natural Monuments
- Japanese cruiser Haguro
- JMSDF destroyer Haguro
