= Tomoe =

Japanese comma-like swirl symbol

Three tomoe

Tomoe (巴; also written 鞆絵), (Note: There are in fact seven variants for writing tomoe:ともゑ,巴, 鞆画, 鞆,鞆絵, 艫絵 and 伴絵.) commonly translated as "comma", is a comma-like swirl symbol used in Japanese mon (roughly equivalent to a heraldic badge or charge in European heraldry). It closely resembles the usual form of a magatama.

The tomoe appears in many designs with various uses. The simplest, most common patterns of the device contain from one to four tomoe, and are reminiscent of similar designs that have been found in wide distribution around the world, such as the triskelion. When circumscribed in a circle, it often appears in a set of three, with this design known as the mitsudomoe (三ツ巴).

== Etymology ==
The character 巴 (Chinese pronunciation bā) has several meanings, ranging from a Sichuan toponym to a crust formed by dryness, parts of the body such as hands or cheeks, and, as a verb, bearing the sense of "to hope", "expect" or "be anxious over". The Chinese character used to depict, according to Bernhard Karlgren's interpretation of the small seal script graph, a python.

One view is that the word refers to a picture e (絵) of a tomo (鞆), or drawings on the latter, the tomo in question, in archaic Japanese tömö, (Note: Roy Andrew Miller vocalizes it tömo. (止毛) This article follows Ōno et al.) being a round leather arm protector, like the bracer or gauntlet tab of European archery. Roy Andrew Miller describes it as "a small hollow sack or bulb of sewn leather with leather tie straps, sometimes embossed with a comma like decorative device (tomoe) of continental origin". It was worn on the left elbow or wrist of an archer either to prevent chafing from the bowstring (tsuru: 弦) twanging back to position on the release of an arrow, or to strike fear into the enemy from the sharp sound caused by the bowstring hitting the wrist guard. The 'tomo picture' (tomoe) can therefore be interpreted either as a visual pun on the tomo represented, or, otherwise, as taking its name from that object. Several such examples are conserved in Nara at the Shōsōin.

Another view is The Japanese word itself may be of Mongolic origin, since it bears comparison with Middle Mongol tomuüa "twisted horse headdress", from the verb tomu (plait, twist), and Ordos Mongolian t'omok ('a little bag hung on a horse's head'). In this latter connection Tang ceramic figures of horses show small sacks tethered to the lower neck, perhaps to stop the horse from throwing its head back.

== Theories of its origin ==
The origin of the tomoe design is uncertain. The most common view is that tomoe patterns originated in magatama jewelry from late Jōmon period approximately 1,000 BCE of Japan which was used for the shinto rituals. A pattern resembling the two-comma tomoe (futatsudomoe) has been found in ancient cultures on all inhabited continents. A stylized design on a Yangshao bowl dates back to 2,000 BCE. The motif of two encircling dolphins biting each other's tails has been found on Cretan ceramics dating from the Minoan period (1700–1400 BCE), and the two fish biting each other in circular fashion recurs in both Chinese and Central Mexican ware. It is frequently seen on prehistoric Celtic remains, and one mirror from Balmaclellan is almost identical to the mitsudomoe. In China, the double comma form came to be assimilated to the Yin-Yang philosophy of opposing male/female principles, formalized in the Tàijítú design of the late Song dynasty period. (Note: Tàijí (太極) being the Primordial One from which the dualities emerged.) This in turn recurs in the seventh century in Unified Silla (now Korea), where it was known as taegeuk. and also in the Japanese futatsudomoe and mitsudomoe patterns, the former in association with divinatory rites, the latter frequently linked to temple drums with apotropaic functions. According to Jean Herbert in these contexts, the mitsudomoe embodied three spirits, the yin-yang dyad being represented by an aramitama (rough kami) and a nigimitama (gentle kami), while the third comma denoted the sakimitama, or lucky spirit. (Note: van Gulik citing Jean Herbert, Shintô; at the fountain-head of Japan, Stein and Day, 1967 p.61.) However, there is no clear evidence tomoe, taijitu and yin-yang is directly related.

Neil Gordon Munro argued that the basis for the mitsudomoe pattern, a motif found also among the Ainu, was the eastern European and western Asian figure of the triskelion, which he believed lay behind the Chinese three-legged crow design, and, in his view, its reflex in the mythical Japanese crow, the Yatagarasu (八咫烏).

=== Tomoe emblem history in Japan ===
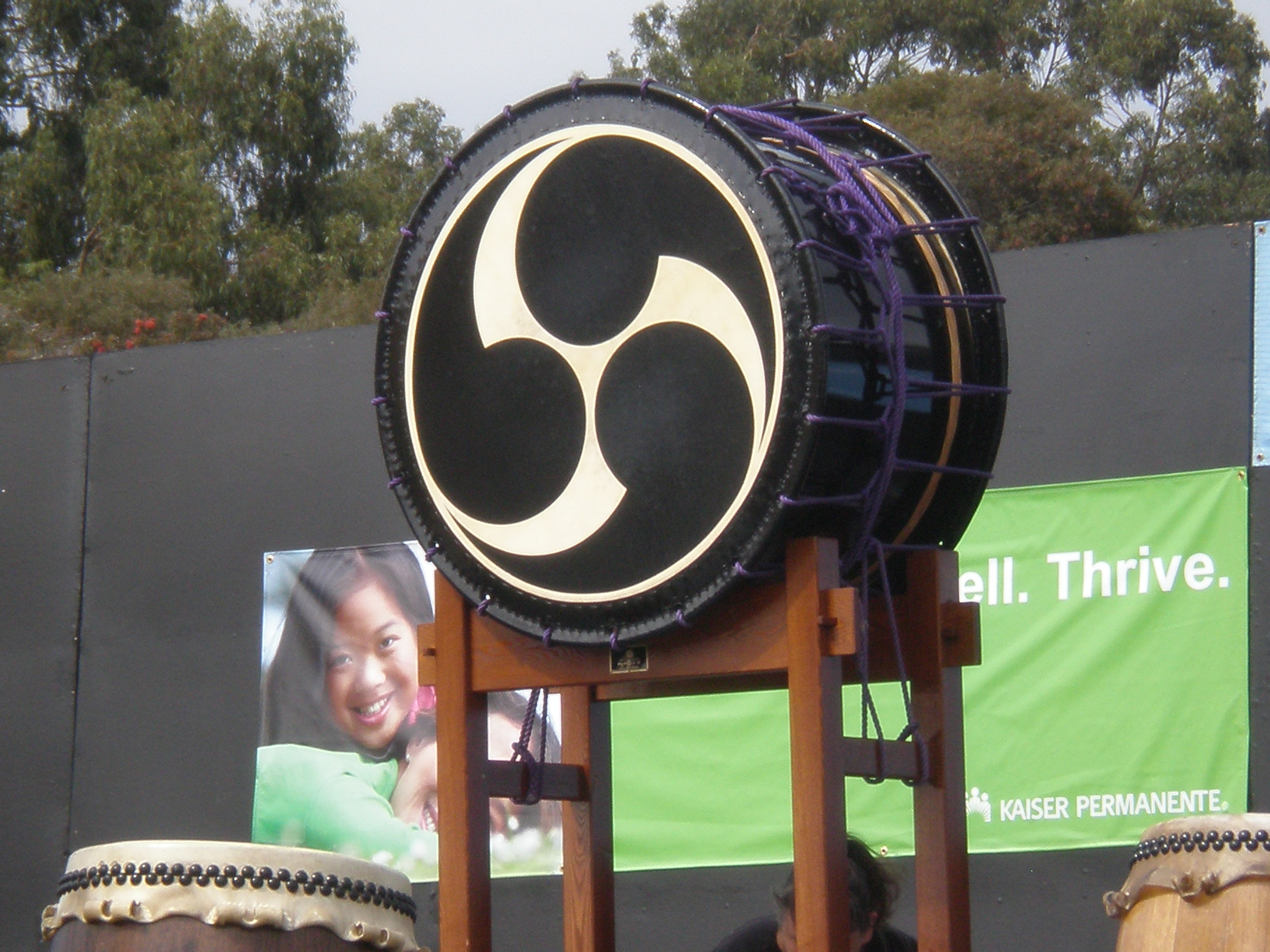
A mitsudomoe design on a taiko drum

As a leather (Note: The Engishiki states that the tomo consisted of an outer covering of bearskin, and an inner sheath of cowhide, though variants with deerskin were also manufactured.) wrist protector tomo appear to have been employed at least as early as the Kofun period, where they are frequently attested on haniwa terracotta figurines depicting archers, and may even have had, aside from their military function, a ritual or fetish value, perhaps related to their phallic shape. The pattern was also interpreted as water swirling, and because it is a water-related pattern, the Tomoe pattern was applied to roof tiles on buildings at the end of the Heian period as a fire protection.

The tomoe emblem established itself as a common emblem during the Fujiwara ascendency of the late Heian period, around the 10th–11th centuries, and proliferated through to Kamakura times. It is thought that a resemblance between the tomoe and the Emperor Ōjin found in the Nihongi may also account for its rising popularity among samurai, since Ōjin was apotheosized as a god in Hachiman shrines.

In the Nihongi account, when Ōjin was born, inspection of his body revealed a fleshy growth on his arm similar to a warrior's wrist or elbow pad, and for this reason he was called homuta (誉田: lit.(Lord) Armguard) (OJ: pomuda), (Note: Pomuda-wakë-nö-mikötö.) an old word for a tomo. (Note: 既産之、宍生腕上、其形如鞆、是肖皇太后爲雄裝之負鞆肖、此云阿叡、故稱其名謂譽田天皇 ('When he was born there was flesh growing on his arm in shape like an elbow pad. As to this resemblance, the Emperor judged that it was the elbow-pad worn as a manly accoutrement. Therefore he was styled by this name, and called the Emperor Homuda').)

=== Usage in Ryukyu ===
A Ryukyuan banner seen on ships.

Fragmentary sources suggest that the First Shō dynasty, who founded the Ryukyu Kingdom, used the symbol if not as their family crest. American historian George H. Kerr claims that King Shō Toku adopted the mitsudomoe as the crest of the royal house after his successful invasion of Kikai Island in 1465.(Kerr 2011, p. 101) The Second Shō dynasty, who ruled the Ryukyu Kingdom from 1470 to 1879, adopted the mitsudomoe as its family crest. Since it was the royal family crest, its usage was once severely restricted. Okinawans who visited Japan shortly after the kingdom's annexation in 1879 were surprised that mitsudomoe banners were flown everywhere. During the American military occupation of Okinawa Prefecture, the United States Civil Administration of the Ryukyu Islands (USCAR) made a failed attempt to recreate a Ryukyuan national flag with a mitsudomoe, only to find that Okinawans were apathetic towards, or did not recognize, the former royal family's symbol. Today the symbol is still regarded as a symbol for Ryukyu and, to a lesser extent, Okinawa.

== Symbolism and uses ==
The mitsudomoe is closely associated with Shinto shrines, in particular those dedicated to Hachiman, the god of war and archery. Hachiman in Shinto cosmology and ritual, as for example at Hakozaki Shrine, is repeatedly connected with the number three. In Shintoist thinking, this number is taken to represent the three aspects of the four mitama or 'souls' (the other, the kushimitama being considered far rarer).

It is also commonly displayed on banners and lanterns used in festivals and rituals related to Amaterasu-ōmikami, who in the Kojiki confronts her brother Susanoo when he usurps her terrain on earth by dressing as an archer, adorned with magatama beads and 'an awesome high arm-guard' (itu nö takatömö). (Note: 伊都之竹鞆.)

A third element of its symbolic panorama concerns water, an association engendered by its swirling pattern. For this reason, it is said to be located on roofs and gables as a charm against fire.

Since Hachiman was worshipped as the guardian of warriors, it was adopted as a common design element in Japanese family emblems (家紋, kamon) by various samurai clans such as the Nagao, Kobayakawa and Utsunomiya. Among aristocrats, the Saionji family used it as its family emblem. The Koyasan Shingon sect of Buddhism uses the mitsudomoe as a visual representation of the cycle of life.

Tomoe also is a personal name, dating at least back to Tomoe Gozen (巴御前), a famous female warrior celebrated in The Tale of the Heike account of the Genpei War. In Kyoto's Jidai Matsuri festival, she appears in the Heian period section of the procession in samurai costume, and parades as a symbol of feminine gallantry.

The tomoe has also been adopted as a corporate logo in Japan.

The mitsudomoe is also the logo of the OBS Studio application since it released in 2012.

== Similar designs ==
The two-fold tomoe is almost identical in its design elements to the Chinese symbol known as a taijitu, while the three-fold tomoe is similar to the Korean tricolored taegeuk which is originated in taijitsu. However, there is no clear evidence tomoe and taijitsu is directly related. Also note that the negative space in between the swirls of a fourfold tomoe forms a swastika-like shape, which is fairly prominent in many Indian religions such as Hinduism and Jainism and Buddhism. A similar design can also be found in the some forms of the Celtic spiral triskele as well as with the Basque lauburu and the Sicilian Trinacria.

== Gallery ==
Futatsudomoe, "twofold tomoe"

Hidari-mitsudomoe ("left threefold tomoe") is widely used in Shinto shrines and as a family emblem

Yottsudomoe ("Fourfold tomoe")

Migiitsutsutomoe ("Fivefold tomoe")

== See also ==
- Gankyil, a symbol in Tibetan and East Asian Buddhism composed of three swirling and interconnected blades
- Gogok, a comma-shaped jewel found in the Korean Peninsula
- Lauburu, the Basque cross
- Mon (emblem)
- Pig dragon or zhūlóng, a zoomorphic stone artifact produced in Neolithic China with a C- or comma-like shape
- Triskelion

== Sources ==
- Aston, W. G. (1972) [1896]. Nihongi:Chronicles of Japan from the earliest Times to A. D. 697. Vol. 1. Tuttle Publishing.
- Bauer, Helen; Carlquist, Sherwin (1974) [1965]. Japanese Festivals. Tuttle Publishing.
- Brown, Steven T. (June 1998). "From Woman Warrior to Peripatetic Entertainer: The Multiple Histories of Tomoe". Harvard Journal of Asiatic Studies. 58 (1): 183–199. doi:10.2307/2652649. JSTOR 2652649.
- Chamberlain, Basil Hall (1982) [1882]. The Kojiki: Records of Ancient Matters. Tuttle Publishing.
- Darvas, György (2007). Symmetry: Cultural-historical and Ontological Aspects of Science-Arts Relations; the Natural and Man-made World in an Interdisciplinary Approach. Springer Science & Business Media. ISBN 978-3-764-37554-6.
- Eberhard, Wolfram (1986). A Dictionary of Chinese Symbols. Routledge. ISBN 978-0-415-00228-8.
- Garcia, Hector (2011). Geek in Japan: Discovering the Land of Manga, Anime, Zen, and the Tea Ceremony. Tuttle Publishing. ISBN 978-1-462-90629-1.
- Heldt, Gustav (2014). The Kojiki: An Account of Ancient Matters. Columbia University Press. ISBN 978-0-231-16388-0.
- Herbert, Jean (2010) [1967]. Shinto: At the Fountainhead of Japan. Routledge. ISBN 978-1-136-90376-2.
- Honda, Sōichirō (2004). Nihon no Kamon Taizen (日本の家紋大全). Tokyo: Gotō Shoin (梧桐書院). ISBN 978-4-340-03102-3.
- Takamori, Ikuya; Huffman, Jeff, eds. (2007). Family Crests of Japan. Stone Bridge Press. ISBN 978-1-933-33030-3.
- Karlgren, Bernhard (1974) [1923]. Analytical Dictionary of Chinese and Sino-Japanese. Dover Publications.
- Kerr, George H. (2011) [1958]. Okinawa: The History of an Island People. Tuttle Publishing. ISBN 978-1-462-90184-5.
- Miki, Fumio (1969). Haniwa: the clay sculpture of protohistoric Japan. Tuttle Publishing.
- Miller, R. A. (1967). The Japanese Language. University of Chicago Press.
- Munro, N. Gordon (1911). "Some Origins and Survivals" (PDF). Transactions of the Asiatic Society of Japan. 38: 1–74, 48ff.
- Numata, Yorisuke (頼輔) (1940). Monshō no Kenkyū (紋章の研究: A Study of Crests). Sōgensha (創元社).
- Ōno, Susumu; Satake, Akihiro; Maeda, Kingorō (1974). Kogo jiten 古語辞典. Iwanami Shoten.
- Philippi, Donald L. (1968). Kojiki. Princeton University Press, Tokyo University Press.
- Repp, Martin (2002). "Protecting kami of the Japanese Nation". In Kubota, Hiroshi; Antoni, Klaus J.; Nawrocki, Johann; Wachutka, Michael (eds.). Religion and National Identity in the Japanese Context. LIT Verlag Münster. pp. 169–191. ISBN 978-3-825-86043-1.
- Sakamoto, Tarō; Inoue, Mitsusada; Ienaga, Saburō; Ōno, Susumu (1967). Nihon Shoki (日本書紀 ). Iwanami Koten Bungaku Taikei. Vol. 67. Iwanami Shoten.
- "Shinto Symbols (Continued)". Contemporary Religions in Japan. 7 (2). Nanzan University: 89–142. June 1966. JSTOR 30232989.
- Snodgrass, Mary Ellen (2015) [2013]. World Clothing and Fashion: An Encyclopedia of History Culture, and Social Influence. Routledge. ISBN 9781317451662.
- Taguchi, Nishū (1978). Ryūkyū monshō fu (琉球紋章譜). Hyakunensha (百年社).
- Turnbull, Stephen (2012) [2002]. Samurai Heraldry. Bloomsbury Publishing. ISBN 978-1-782-00014-3.
- van Gulik, Willem R. (1982). Irezumi. Brill Archive. ISBN 978-1-782-00014-3.
- Williams, E. Leslie (2007). Spirit Tree: Origins of Cosmology in Shintô Ritual at Hakozaki. University Press of America. ISBN 978-0-761-83416-8.
