= Ōshio Hachimangu =

Shinto shrine in Echizen, Fukui Prefecture, Japan

Coordinates: 35°51′8″N 136°21′10″E

Ōshio Hachimangu 大塩八幡宮
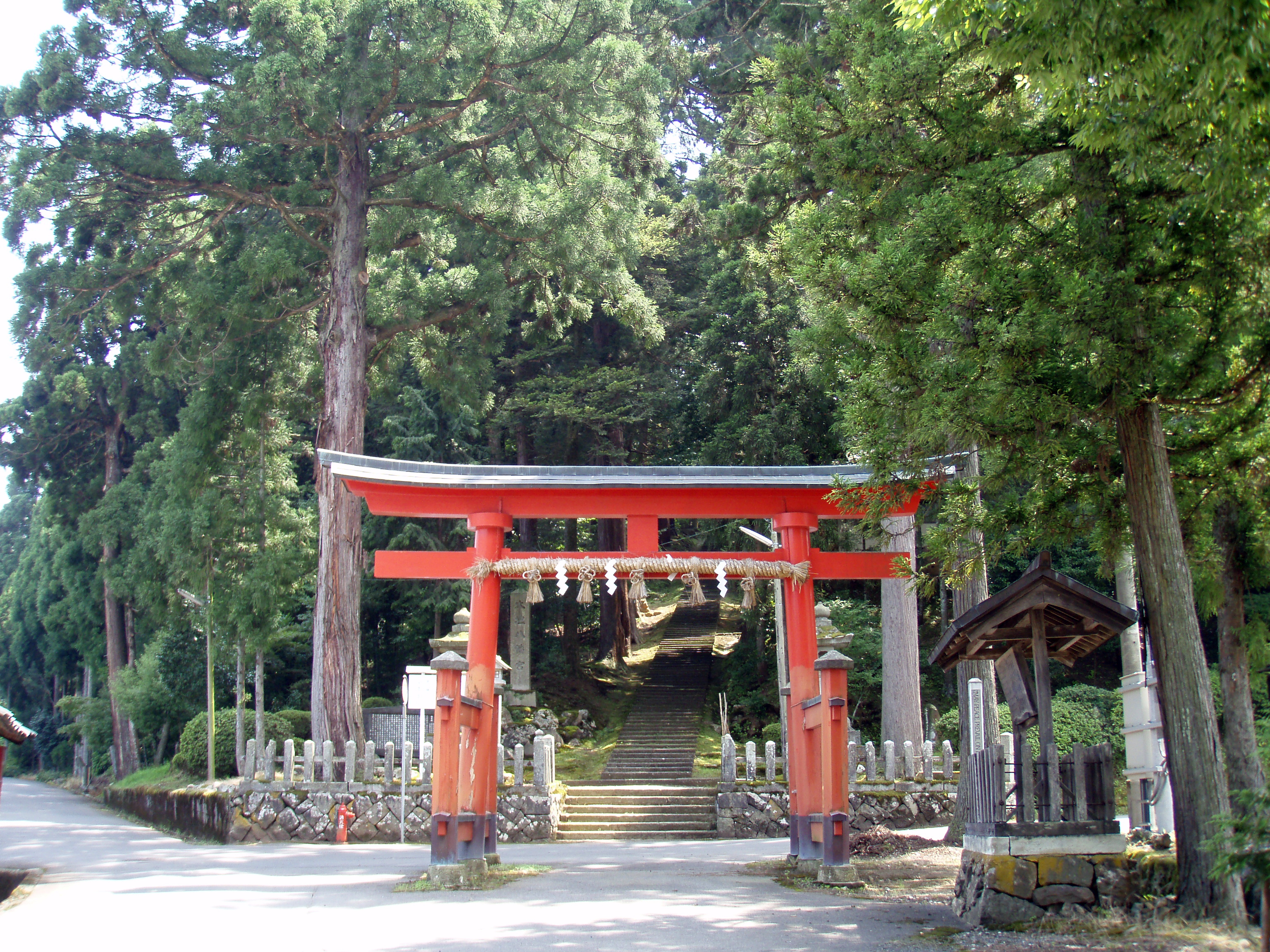
- Ōshio Hachiman-gū

- Ōshio Hachiman-gū Ōshio Hachimangu (Japan)

Religion
- Affiliation: Shinto
- Deity: Hachiman
- Festival: September 25
- Type: Hachiman shrine

Location
- Location: 22-2 Kunikane-cho, Echizen-shi, Fukui-ken 915-0862
- Interactive map of Ōshio Hachimangu 大塩八幡宮

Architecture
- Style: Nagare-zukuri
- Founder: Ki no Tomonaka
- Established: 891

Ōshio Hachiman Shrine (大塩八幡宮, Ōshio Hachimangū) is a Shinto shrine located in the city of Echizen, Fukui Prefecture, Japan. The main festival of the shrine is held annually on September 25.

== Enshrined kami ==
The kami enshrined at Ōshio Hachimangū is the Hachiman triad, which is an amalgamation of:

- Emperor Ōjin (応神天皇)
- Emperor Chūai (仲哀天皇)
- Empress Jingū (神功皇后)

== History ==
According to the shrine's history, which is dated 1464, in 887, Chunagon Ki no Tomonaka, who was exiled to the provincial capital of Echizen Province due to false accusations, planted a sakaki tree on the present site and prayed to the Hachiman deity of Iwashimizu for his return to Heian-kyō. In 889, he received an imperial decree and was able to return, and two years later, in 891, he constructed a shrine to give thanksgiving to the kami of Iwashimizu Hachiman-gū. At the time of its establishment, it became the guardian shrine of Ōshioho in the former Nanjō County. In 1183, Kiso Yoshinaka established his headquarters on the shrine grounds and stayed there during part of the Genpei War. The Kamakura shogunate donated rice fields, and during the Kenmu era (1334-1338), Shiba Takatsune oversaw its reconstruction. Following this, successive shugo (provincial governors) from the Shiba and Asakura clans donated fields, forests, and rebuilt and repaired the shrine buildings. Although it experienced periods of decline, including the loss of all its land during the Tenshō era (1573-1592) uprising and Toyotomi Hideyoshi's land survey, it was revived in 1603 when Yūki Hideyasu, the founder of Fukui Domain, donated 30 koku of land, and his retainer, Honda Tomimasa, prayed for continued military success. Subsequently, in 1623, Hideyasu's son, Matsudaira Tadanao, added another 20 koku. Throughout the Edo period, the shrine continued to be supported by the daimyō of Fukui Domain.

In 1871, it was designated a county shrine, and in 1874, the former Modern system of ranked Shinto Shrines, it was a prefectural shrine (県社, Kensha).

== Cultural properties ==
=== National Important Cultural Properties ===
- Haiden (拝殿), Muromachi period The worship hall is a hip-and-gable roof structure with seven bays on the front and four bays on the sides, covered with hinoki cypress bark shingles. The main building, with five bays on the front and two bays on the sides, has eaves on all four sides and retains ancient features such as boat-shaped brackets. It has an open structure without partitions, walls, or verandas. The exact date of its construction is unknown, but it is believed to have been built at the end of the Muromachi period. Due to its thick timber framing and being one of the few remaining large-scale buildings of its kind, it was designated a National Important Cultural Property in 1978.

=== Fukui Prefectural Tangible Cultural Properties ===
- Saddle (鞍), Sengoku to Edo period; a set of three said to have been brought back by the Honda clan after the Summer Battle of Osaka and donated by Honda Tomimasa (one with plum blossom and grape motifs in makie lacquer (1596), one with tomoe motifs in mother-of-pearl inlay (1611), one with Zhang Liang warrior motif in makiie lacquer)

=== Fukui Prefectural Tangible Folk Cultural Properties ===
- Sangaku (算額), Edo period. A sangaku is a votive tablet dedicated to a shrine or temple, depicting mathematical problems and their solutions. This example has a "Crane, Turtle, Pine, and Bamboo" motif and depicts a problem involving a system of four-variable quartic equations about the lifespans of cranes, turtles, pine trees, and bamboo, along with its solution. Illustrations of the cranes, turtles, pine trees, and bamboo are depicted on either side. The problem shows the influence of the Chinese mathematical text "Sangaku Keimō," which is said to have greatly influenced the development of Japanese mathematics (Wasan).

== See also ==
- Hachiman shrine
