= Miyake Hachimangū =

Shinto shrine

Miyake Hachimangū Shrine 三宅八幡宮
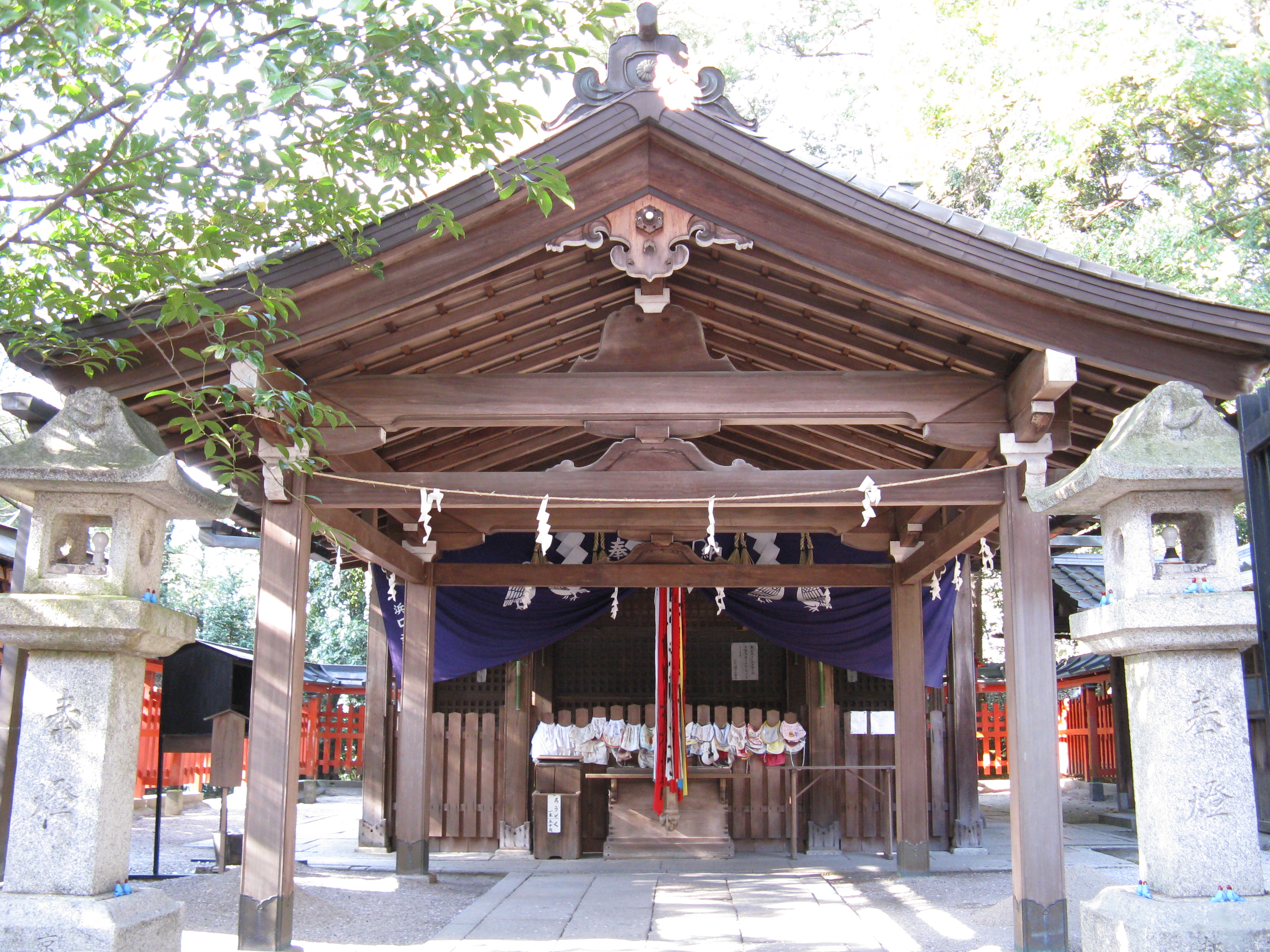
- The Miyake Hachimangū Shrine

- Location within Japan

Religion
- Affiliation: Shinto
- Deity: Hachiman
- Festivals: Autumn Festival, Hojou-e (放生会) (September 14,15, 16th)
- Type: Hachiman Shrine

Location
- Location: Sakyo-ku, Kyoto, Kyoto Prefecture
- Interactive map of Miyake Hachimangū Shrine 三宅八幡宮
- Coordinates: 35°4′6.08″N 135°47′00″E

Architecture
- Style: Hachiman-zukuri
- Established: 859

Website
- http://www.miyake-hachiman.com/

Miyake-Hachimangū (三宅八幡宮) is a Shinto shrine, in Sakyo-ku, Kyoto, Japan. The shrine is famous for worship to beneficial to children, such as baby colic, academic achievement, safe delivery of childbirth. Because Mushi (虫, parasitic worms, insects, bugs) was thought to cause baby colic (疳の虫; kan-no mushi), the shrine also has worship for power to expel Mushi. Therefore the shrine is so-called Mushi-hachiman (虫八幡). Recently, many pieces of large size of Ema was excavated, that represent worship to expel Mushi, and the Ema were designated as National Folk Cultural Properties.

== History ==
The shrine records say that Ono no Imoko built this shrine after his travel to the Sui court in the era of Empress Suiko. In the journey to China, he got sick in the Chikushi region, and prayed for the recovery of his health at Usa Hachimangū. He then successfully accomplished his mission as kenzuishi. He built Miyake Hachimangū in his territory to thank Hachiman.

== See also ==
- List of Shinto shrines
