= Tamukeyama Hachimangū =

Shinto shrine in Nara Prefecture, Japan

Tamukeyama Hachiman Shrine (手向山八幡宮, Tamukeyama Hachimangu)
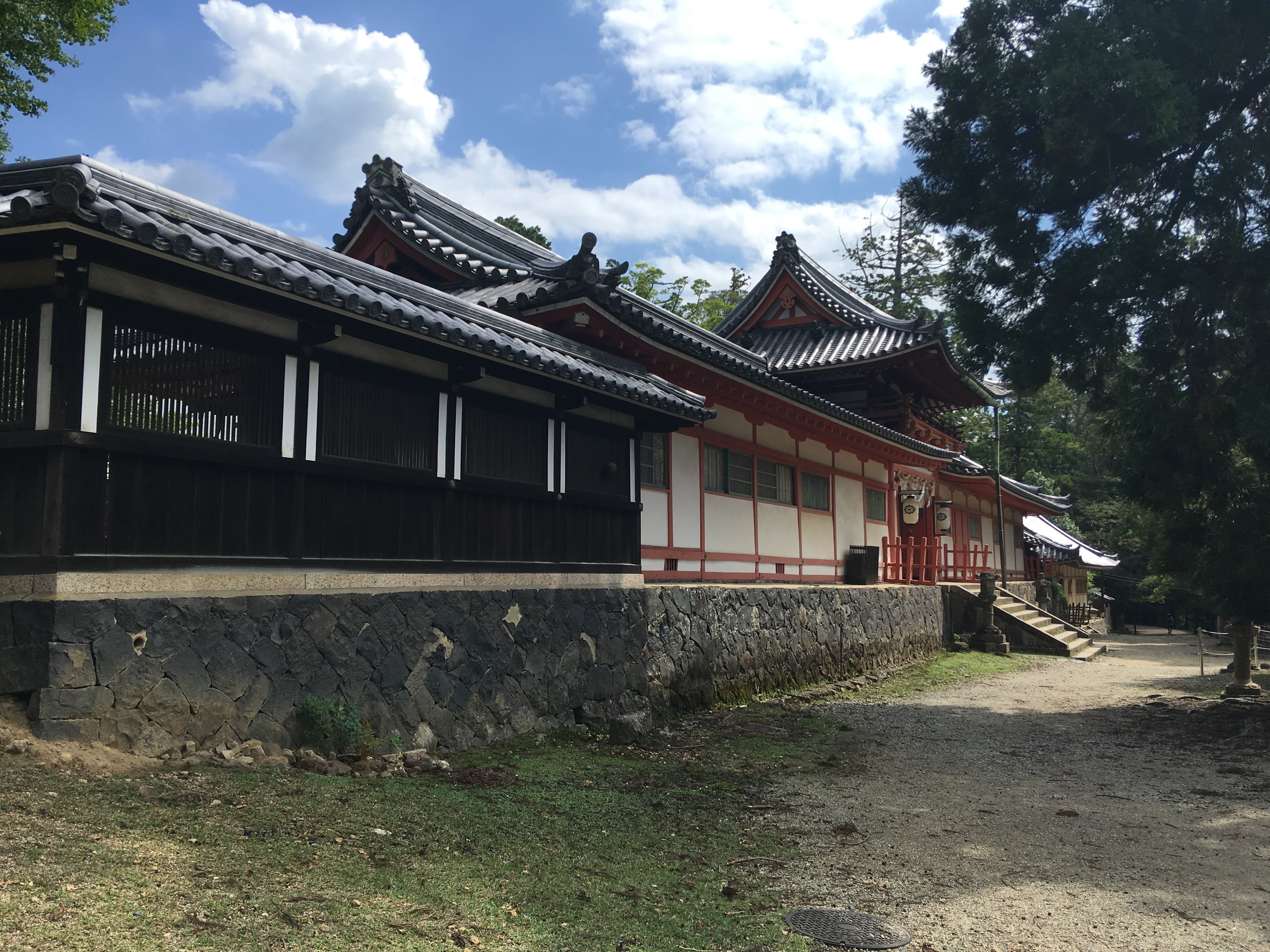

- Location within Japan

Religion
- Affiliation: Shinto

Location
- Coordinates: 34°41′17″N 135°50′41″E

Tamukeyama Hachiman Shrine (手向山八幡宮, Tamukeyama Hachimangū) is a Shinto shrine near Tōdai-ji, Nara, Nara Prefecture, Japan. It is a Hachiman shrine, dedicated to the kami Hachiman. It was established in 749. Kami enshrined here include Emperor Ojin, Emperor Nintoku, Empress Jingū and Emperor Chūai in addition to Hachiman.

== See also ==
- Hachiman shrine
- List of National Treasures of Japan (crafts: others)
