= Shiraoi Hachiman Shrine =

Shrine in Hokkaido, Japan

- 白老八幡神社 (Shiraoi Hachiman jinja)
- A torii at Shiraoi Hachiman Shrine in 2024.

Religion
- Affiliation: Shinto
- Deity: Hachiman, Ōjin Tennō
- Type: Shrine

Location
- Location: Shiraoi, Hokkaido
- Interactive map of Shiraoi Hachiman Shrine
- Coordinates: 42.55220825893161°N 141.35275874589763°E

Website
- https://shiraoihatimanjinjya.org

Shiraoi Hachiman Shrine (白老八幡神社, Shiraoi Hachiman jinja) is a Shinto shrine located in Shiraoi, Hokkaido at 白老郡白老町本町1丁目1番11号. It is a Hachiman shrine, dedicated to the kami Hachiman. Its annual festival is held on the last Friday, Saturday and Sunday of September. In addition to Hachiman, it enshrines Emperor Ōjin (応神天皇, Ōjin-tennō), also known as Hondawake no Mikoto (誉田別尊).

== See also ==
- Hachiman shrine
- List of Shinto shrines in Hokkaidō
