= Flag of Ryukyu =

There have been a number of attempts to create a flag of Ryukyu or Ryukyuan flag (Japanese: 琉球旗, Hepburn: Ryūkyū ki; Okinawan: Rūchū hata) to represent the Ryukyuan people, the Ryukyu Islands, or the former Ryukyu Kingdom.

== Origins ==
The first historical national symbol was a three-comma shape called the Hidari Gomon (左御紋). The adoption of the Hidari Gomon is attested to the last ruler of Okinawa's First Shō Dynasty, King Shō Toku. The King, possibly inspired by Japanese pirates who worshipped the Japanese god of war, Hachiman, adopted Hachiman's symbol and led an invasion of Kikai Island in 1467, later building the Asato Hachimangū shrine and taking the divine name of Hachiman-aji in response to his victory. Corroborating this was the discovery of a wooden coffin inscribed with a mitsudomoe and the year 1500 found in the Momojana tombs in Northern Okinawa.

== Historical usage ==
Around the time of the Invasion of Ryukyu by Satsuma Domain in 1609, historian Stephen Turnbull conjectured that the Hidari Gomon was prominently displayed on flags, banners, and soldiers' uniforms. After being defeated by Satsuma, Ryukyu was allowed to retain its status as an autonomous kingdom, maintaining its traditional tributary relationship to China. Official ships bound for Satsuma thereafter displayed a Japanese-style banner featuring the Shō Dynasty's family crest while private ships were forbidden to do so. Hidenobu Itai, an expert on pre-modern Japanese ships, conjectured that by following the Japanese practice, Ryukyu was displaying its allegiance to Satsuma. The ruling Satsuma Shimazu clan in fact acquiesced in Ryukyu's dual fealty, because it remained a trade conduit between China and Japan, affording the Shimazu a loophole in the restrictions on foreign trade imposed by the Tokugawa isolationist policy. Itai further claims that because Ryukyu was ordered to conceal from China its subjugation to Satsuma, the banner is highly unlikely to have been flown during voyages to China.

Merchant flag used by tribute ships

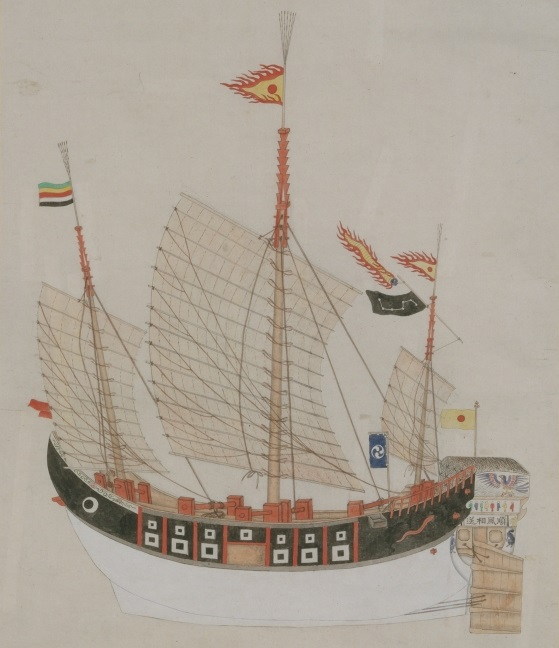
XIX century graphic depicting a Ryukyuan ship

In 1797, a privately owned ship chartered by the kingdom was wrecked on its way to Satsuma and in the next year eventually drifted to Chōshi, a port in modern-day Chiba Prefecture. The flag it was flying was labeled as the "flag of Ryukyu" (琉玖; note the non-standard choice of the second character) in the Bankoku Hakuki Zufu (1854) and a couple of other flag atlases published in Japan from the end of the Edo period to the beginning of the Meiji period. The flag featured a white field with a black mitsudomoe, blue triskelion, and a black vertical line below the crest with a thin red line running through it.

Another Ryukyuan flag appeared in a historical novel titled Ryūkyū shigeki: Tomoebata no akebono (1946). The book was written by Chōchin Yara (1895–1957) and was mimeographed in Nara, to which he had fled in World War II. He claimed that the flag had been the national flag of the Ryukyu Kingdom; he produced a physical flag that he claimed he hid from the Japanese before the war.

Ryukyuan flag proposed by USCAR in 1954

Yara's flag was similar to one created by the United States Civil Administration of the Ryukyu Islands (USCAR) in 1954. The American government used the flag unofficially and informally for a brief period of time in 1954 but never officially adopted it. The flag was part of USCAR's effort in reversing the Japanization of Okinawa and to counter the then-intensifying Okinawan reversion movement by recreating a “Ryukyuan” identity. At first, USCAR tried to impose the complete ban on the display of the flag of Japan, but was unable to do so because the U.S. acknowledged that Japan held "residual sovereignty" over the islands. USCAR eventually allowed special conditions on when the Okinawans could fly the Japanese flag, although Okinawans then fought for an unconditional right. To counter this, USCAR attempted to create a Ryukyuan national flag. The Americans presumed that the new flag, which was based on the family crest of the Shō Dynasty which had ruled the Ryukyu Kingdom, would stir a Ryukyuan nationalistic spirit. USCAR displayed the flag at the Ryukyu-American Friendship Centers, but was soon disappointed with the Okinawans' apathy toward the former royal family's symbol. Most people did not even know what the symbol stood for. The unofficial and informal experiment went largely unnoticed by Okinawans.

In the immediate aftermath of the war, Okinawan merchant ships adopted the D pennant as a naval ensign. However, because the pennant was not recognized as a naval ensign and was not well known, many ships flying the pennant were seized. Eventually USCAR made the Flag of the United States the naval ensign for ships from the Ryukyu Islands, but many Okinawans opted for the Hinomaru in protest. In 1967, a new naval ensign was approved for use by Okinawans by USCAR; it was the flag of Japan with a pennant that read "Ryukyus" and "琉球" (Chinese characters for "Ryukyu") above it.

Civil ensign of the Ryukyu Islands
(1952–1967)

Civil ensign of the Ryukyu Islands
(1967–1972)

After the Ryukyu Islands were returned to Japan in 1972, Okinawa Prefecture was re-established and the current flag of Okinawa Prefecture was adopted.

In 2012, Daisaku Kina, a part-time curator at Naha City Museum of History, wrote a column for Ryūkyū Shimpō about the flag used on Wikipedia as the flag of the Ryukyu Kingdom. He was unable to find contemporary sources in which the flag is used as the national flag. He argued that, as a pre-modern polity, Ryukyu had no notion of a national flag. He raised concern about the circulation of misinformation.

Flag of Okinawa Prefecture

The "flag of Ryukyu" on Wikipedia that was highlighted by Daisaku Kina

== Sources ==
Kerr, George H. (2011) [1958]. Okinawa: The History of an Island People. Tuttle Publishing. ISBN 978-1-462-90184-5.
