= Iino Hachimangū =

Shrine in Iwaki, Fukushima Prefecture, Japan

Coordinates: 37°03′37″N 140°52′56″E

- 飯野八幡宮
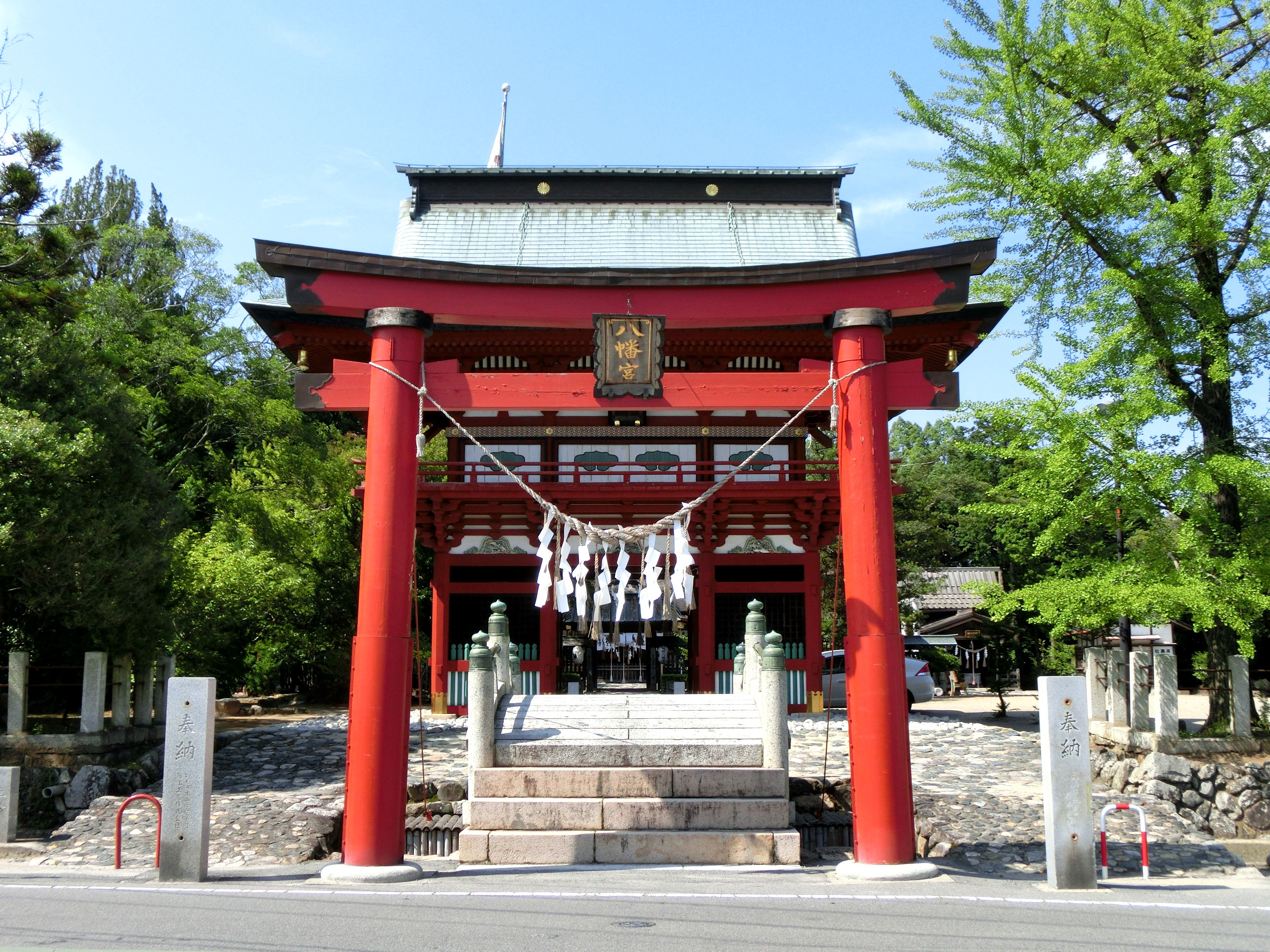

Religion
- Affiliation: Shinto
- Prefecture: Fukushima
- Deity: Emperor Ōjin; Empress Jingū; Himegami
- Festival: September 14
- Type: Former prefectural shrine

Location
- Location: Japan, 〒970-8026 Fukushima, Iwaki, Taira, Hachimankoji−８４
- Municipality: Iwaki
- Country: Japan
- Interactive map of Iino Hachimangū
- Prefecture: Fukushima

Architecture
- Style: Iromoya
- Established: 1063 or 1186

Iino Hachimangū (飯野八幡宮, Iino Hachimangū) is a Shinto shrine located in Iwaki, Fukushima Prefecture, Japan. It is a Hachiman shrine, dedicated to the kami Hachiman. The shrine was founded in either 1063 or 1186, and its annual festival is on September 14. The kami it enshrines include Emperor Ōjin as Hondawake no mikoto (品陀別命), Empress Jingū as Okinagatarashihime no Mikoto (息長帯姫命), and Himegami (比売神).

== See also ==
- List of Shinto shrines in Japan
- Hachiman shrine
