= Fukuyama Hachimangū =

Shinto shrine in Fukuyama, Japan

- 福山八幡宮
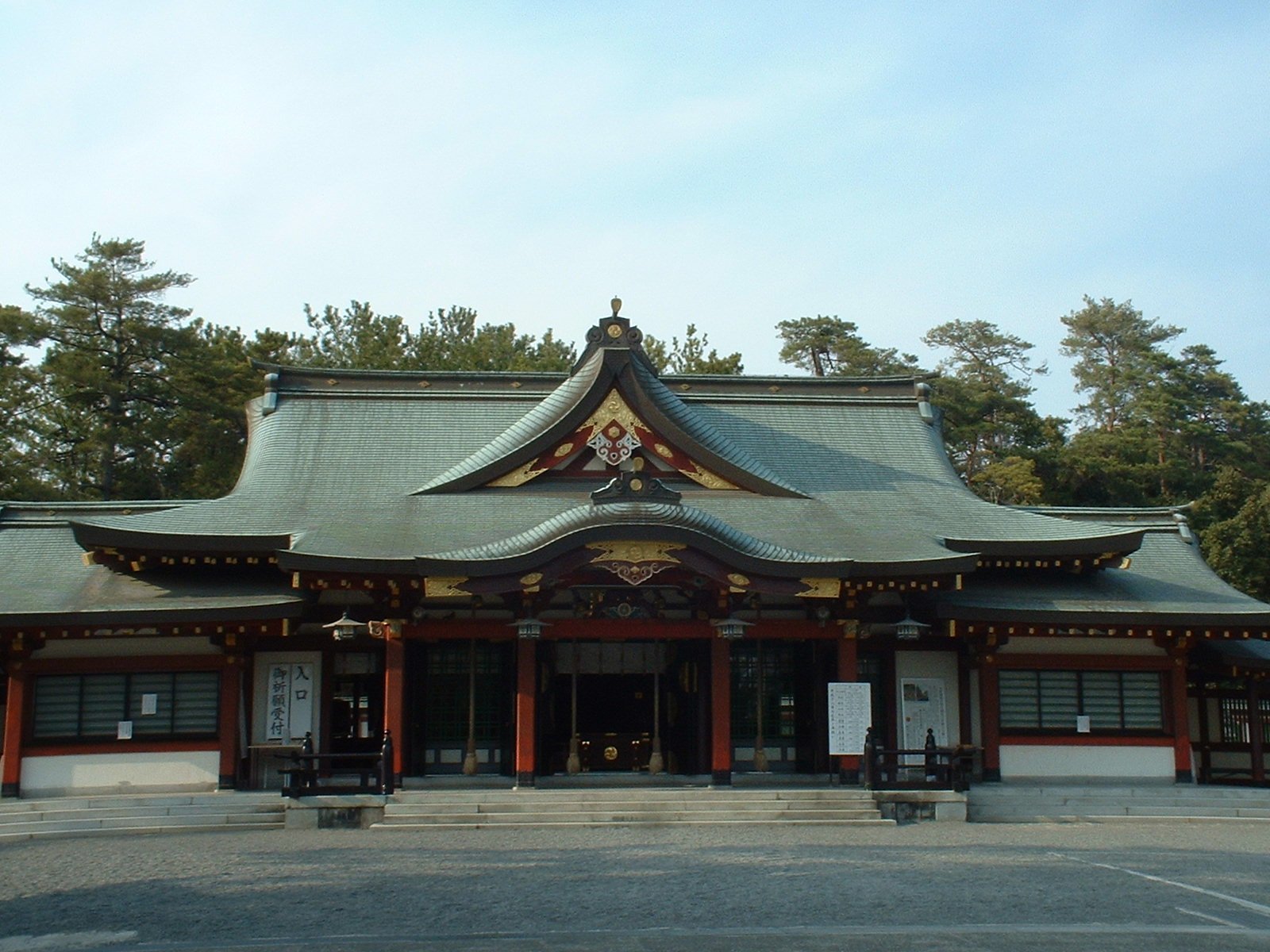
- Central worship hall, ca. 2006

Religion
- Affiliation: Shinto
- Prefecture: Hiroshima
- Deity: Emperor Ōjin, Empress Jingū, Himegami
- Type: Beppyo

Location
- Location: 1 Chome-2-16 Kitayoshizucho, Fukuyama, Hiroshima 720-0073, Japan
- Country: Japan
- Interactive map of Fukuyama Hachimangū
- Prefecture: Hiroshima

Fukuyama Hachimangū (福山八幡宮, Fukuyama Hachimangū) is a Shinto shrine located in Fukuyama, Hiroshima Prefecture, Japan. It is a Hachiman shrine, dedicated to the kami Hachiman. The kami it enshrines include Emperor Ōjin, Empress Jingū, and Himegami (比売神).

== See also ==
- List of Shinto shrines in Japan
- Hachiman shrine
