= Kameyama Hachimangū =

Shinto shrine located in Shimonoseki, Yamaguchi Prefecture, Japan

Coordinates: 33.9575°N 130.9450°E

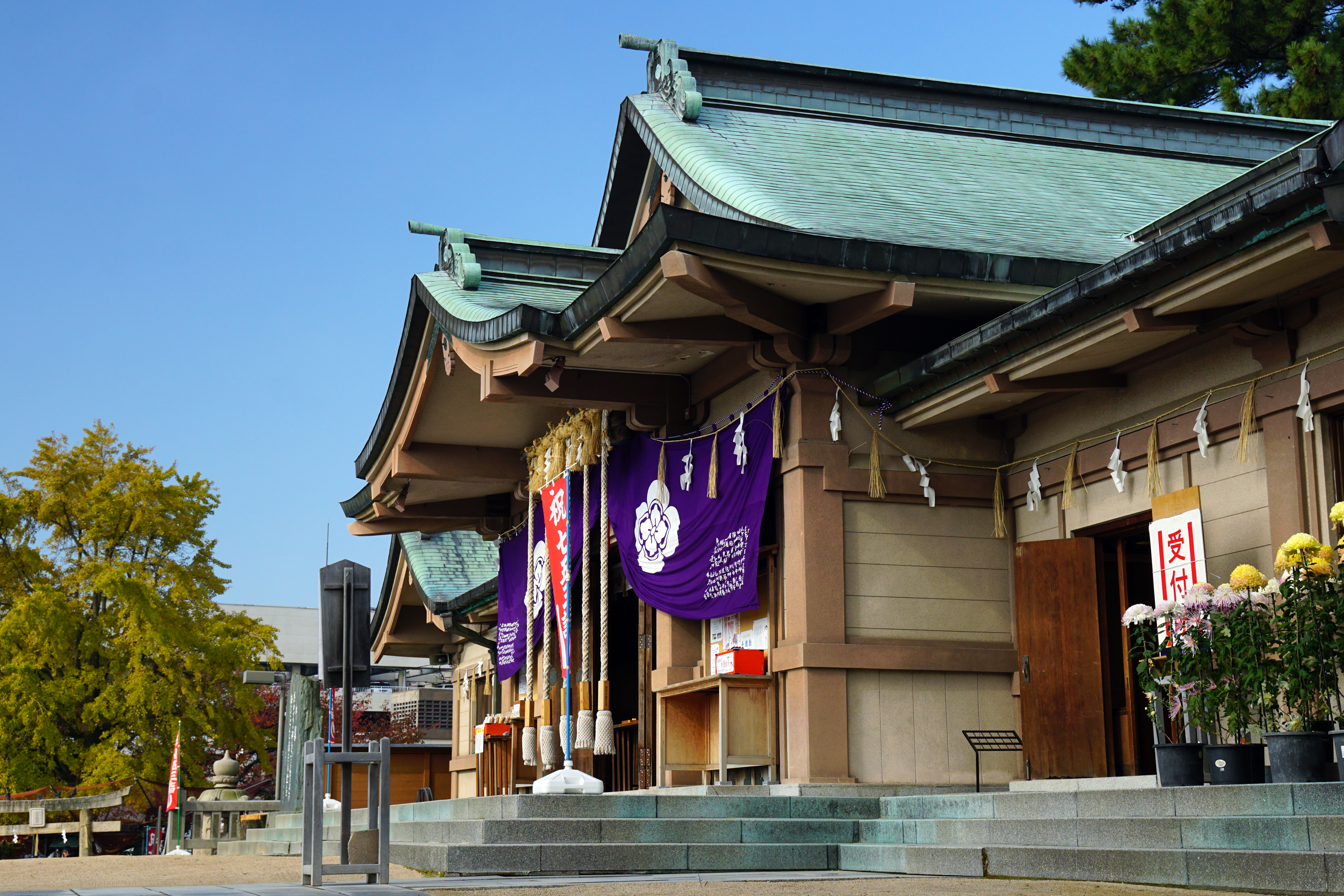
Kameyama Hachimangū

Kameyama Hachimangū (亀山八幡宮, Kameyama Hachimangū) is a Shinto shrine located in Shimonoseki, Yamaguchi Prefecture, Japan. It is a Hachiman shrine, dedicated to the kami Hachiman. The kami enshrined there include Emperor Ōjin, Empress Jingū, and Emperor Chūai. It was established in 859, and has an annual festival on October 15.

The shrine can be reached by bus from Shimonoseki Station.

== See also ==
- List of Shinto shrines in Japan
- Hachiman shrine
