= Hakodate Hachimangū =

Shinto shrine in Hakodate, Hokkaido, Japan

Hakodate Hachiman Shrine (函館八幡宮, Hakodate Hachimangū)
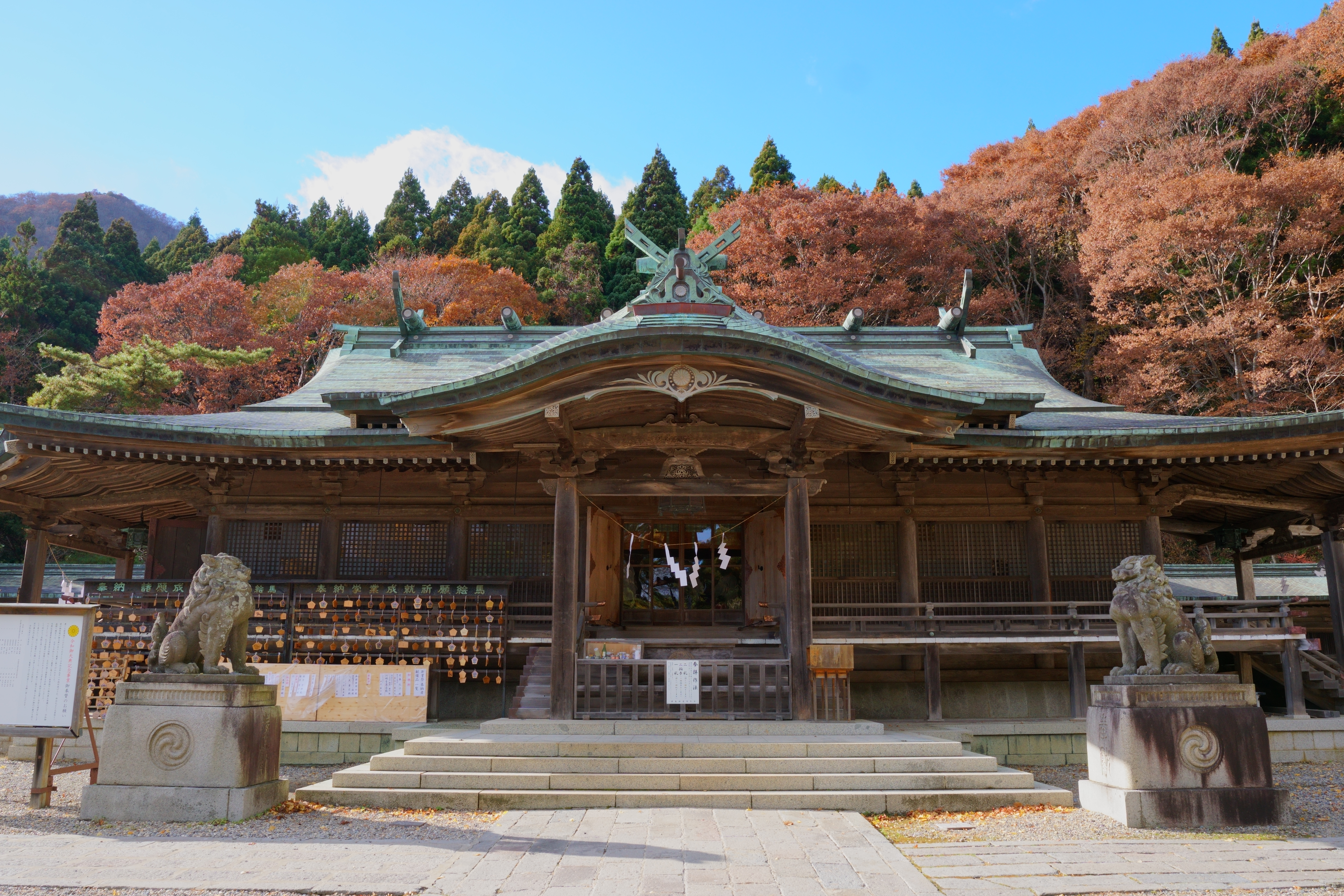
- Hakodate Hachiman Shrine

- Location within Japan

Religion
- Affiliation: Shinto
- Deity: Ōmononushi (Konpira Gongen)

Location
- Location: Hakodate, Hokkaido, Japan
- Coordinates: 41°45′14″N 140°42′36″E

Architecture
- Established: 1445

Hakodate Hachiman Shrine (函館八幡宮, Hakodate Hachimangū) is a Shinto shrine located in Hakodate, Hokkaido. It is a Hachiman shrine, dedicated to the kami Hachiman. It is also a Sōja shrine that enshrines all the deities of its region, although it technically does not have a province.

It was established in 1445. Its main festival is held annually on August 15. Kami enshrined here include Emperor Ōjin as Hondawake no mikoto (品陀和気命), Sumiyoshi no Okami (住吉大神), and Kotohira no Okami (金刀比羅大神). It was formerly a National Shrine of the Second Rank (国幣中社, kokuhei-chūsha) in the modern system of ranked Shinto shrines.

== See also ==
- Hachiman shrine
