= Hakozaki Shrine =

Shinto shrine in Fukuoka, Japan

Hakozaki Shrine (筥崎宮, Hakozaki-gū)
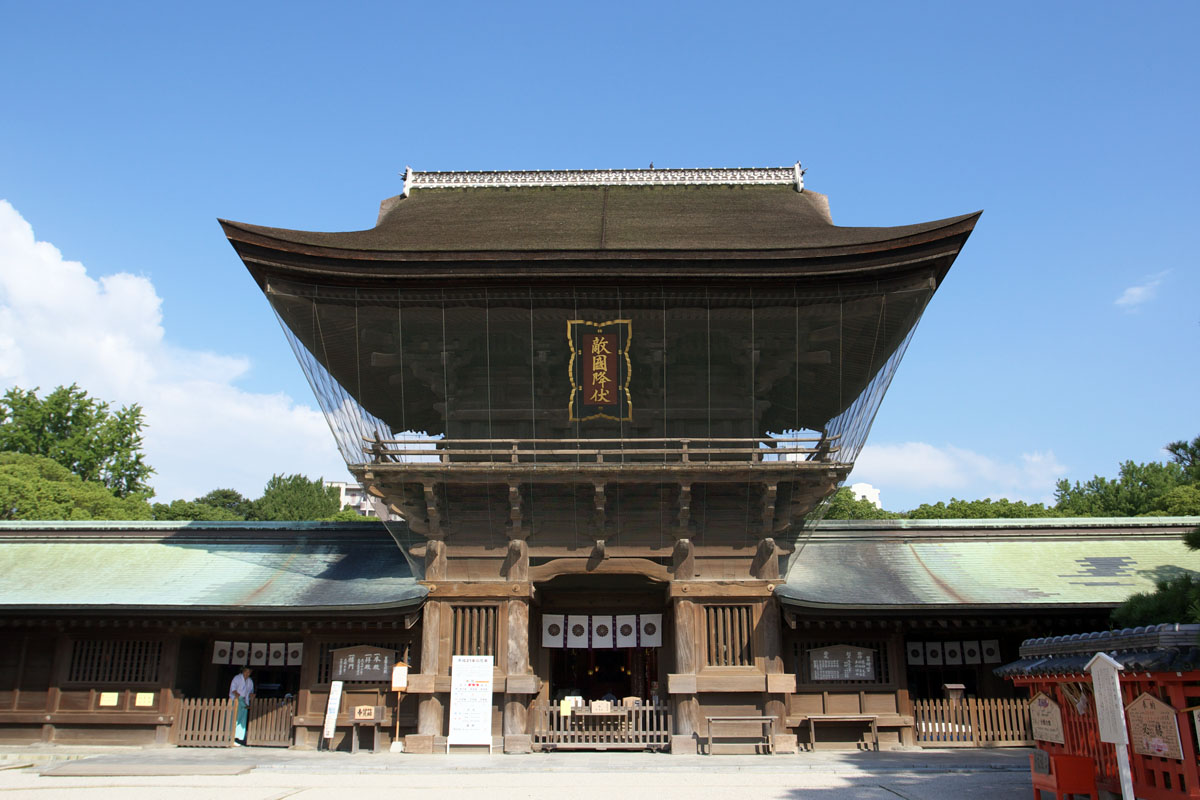
- Hakozaki Shrine's rōmon

- Location within Japan

Religion
- Affiliation: Shinto
- Deity: Emperor Ōjin; Empress Jingū; Tamayori-hime

Location
- Interactive map of Hakozaki Shrine (筥崎宮, Hakozaki-gū)
- Coordinates: 33°36′52″N 130°25′24″E

Hakozaki Shrine (筥崎宮, Hakozaki-gū) is a Shintō shrine in Fukuoka .

== History ==
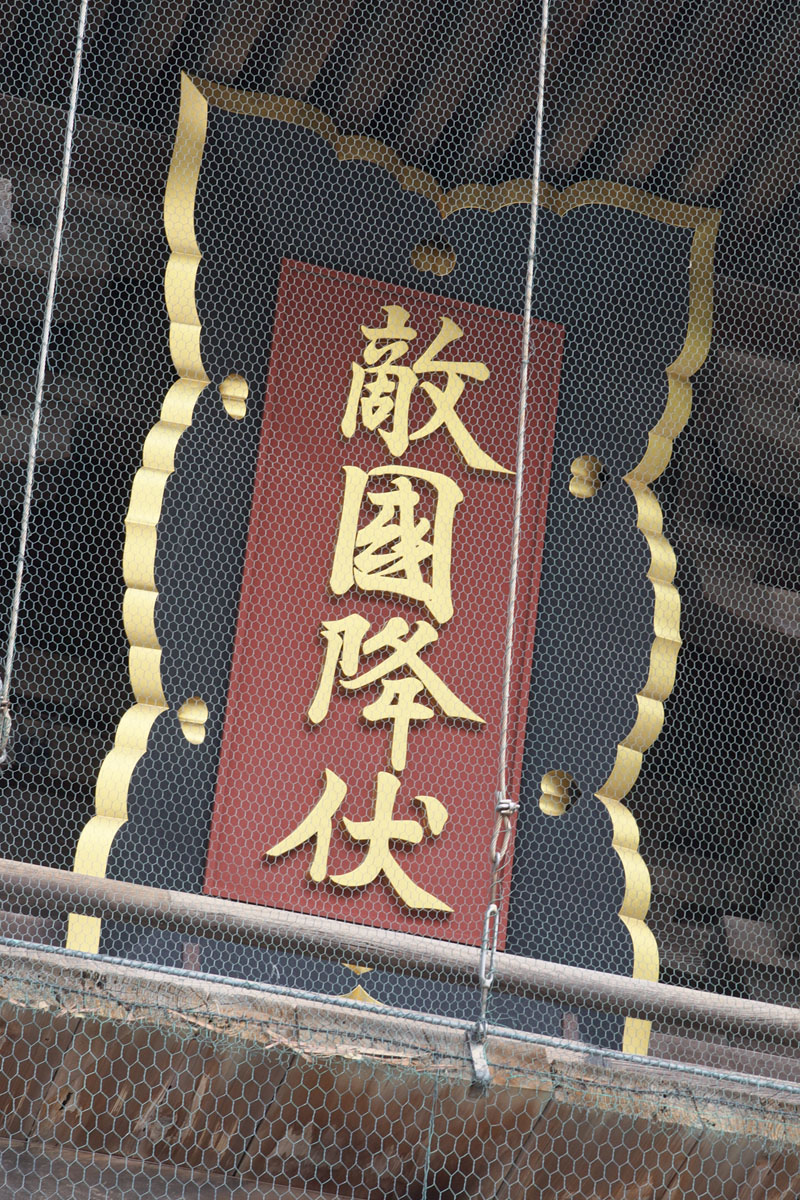
Calligraphy Tekikoku kōfuku

Hakozaki Shrine was founded in 923 (1103 years ago), with the transfer of the spirit of the kami Hachiman from Daibu Hachiman Shrine in what is Honami Commandry, Chikuzen Province in Kyūshū.

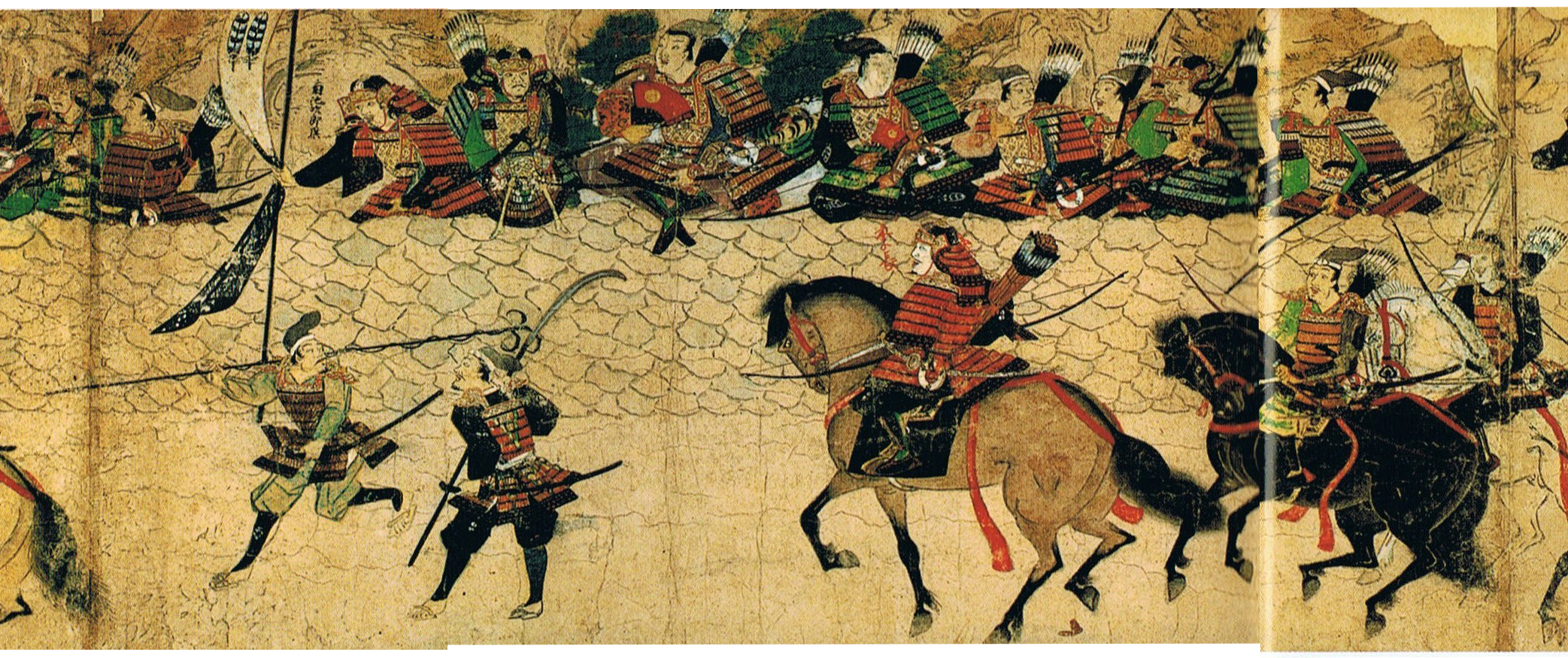
Japanese samurai defending the stone barrier -- from the narrative picture scroll Mōko Shūrai Ekotoba, which was painted between 1275 and 1293

During the first Mongol invasion on November 19, 1274 (Bun'ei 11, 20th day of the 10th month), the Japanese defenders were pushed back from the several landing sites. In the ensuing skirmishes, the shrine was burned to the ground. When the shrine was reconstructed, a calligraphy Tekikoku kōfuku (敵国降伏; surrender of the enemy nation) was put on the tower gate. The calligraphy was written by Emperor Daigo, dedicated by Emperor Daijo Kameyama as a supplication to Hachiman to defeat invaders.

The shrine is highly ranked among the many shrines in Japan. It was listed in Engishiki-jinmyōchō (延喜式神名帳) edited in 927. In 11th or 12th century, the shrine was ranked as Ichinomiya (一宮; first shrine) of Chikuzen Province.

From 1871 to 1946, Hakozaki was officially designated a Kanpei-taisha (官幣大社), in the first rank of government supported shrines. Other similar Hachiman shrines were Iwashimizu Hachimangū of Yawata in Kyoto Prefecture and Usa Shrine of Usa in Ōita Prefecture.

== Shinto belief ==
Hakozaki Shrine is dedicated to the veneration of the kami Hachiman. This shrine especially venerates the memory of Emperor Ōjin, Empress Jingū and Tamayori-bime.

== Treasures ==
A number of structures in the shrine complex have been designated as important cultural assets of Japan, including the main hall, the worship hall, tower gate and the main Torii, Ichino-torii. This torii gate was demolished in 2018, as it became too expensive to repair after pieces started to fall off. It has not been replaced.

== Festivals ==
The annual Tamaseseri Festival (January 3) and the Hojoya Festival (September 12–18) attract many visitors to the shrine.

== Shinan Ship ==
Hakozaki-gu was one of the intended destinations of the cargo that the so-called Shinan ship was to deliver from Ningbo to Hakata which route was also one of the final sections of the historic Maritime Silk Route. The ship sailed in the 14th century before it sank close to Korean shores due to bad weather conditions. This became apparent after the wreckage was found almost seven hundred years later. On some of the wooden labels or wooden tags(木間) that were used customarily to identify the cargo, the Chinese calligraphy characters of Hakozaki Shrine(筥崎宮) could be clearly read. The main destination of the ship's cargo was Tofuku-ji Temple in Kyoto as a fire caused serious damage and materials for reconstruction as well as replacements for artifacts were needed. Joten-ji Temple in Hakata was also to receive some of the ship's valuable cargo.

== See also ==
- List of Shinto shrines
- Japanese mythology
- Ugayafukiaezu
