= Hachiman shrine =

Shinto shrine dedicated to Hachiman

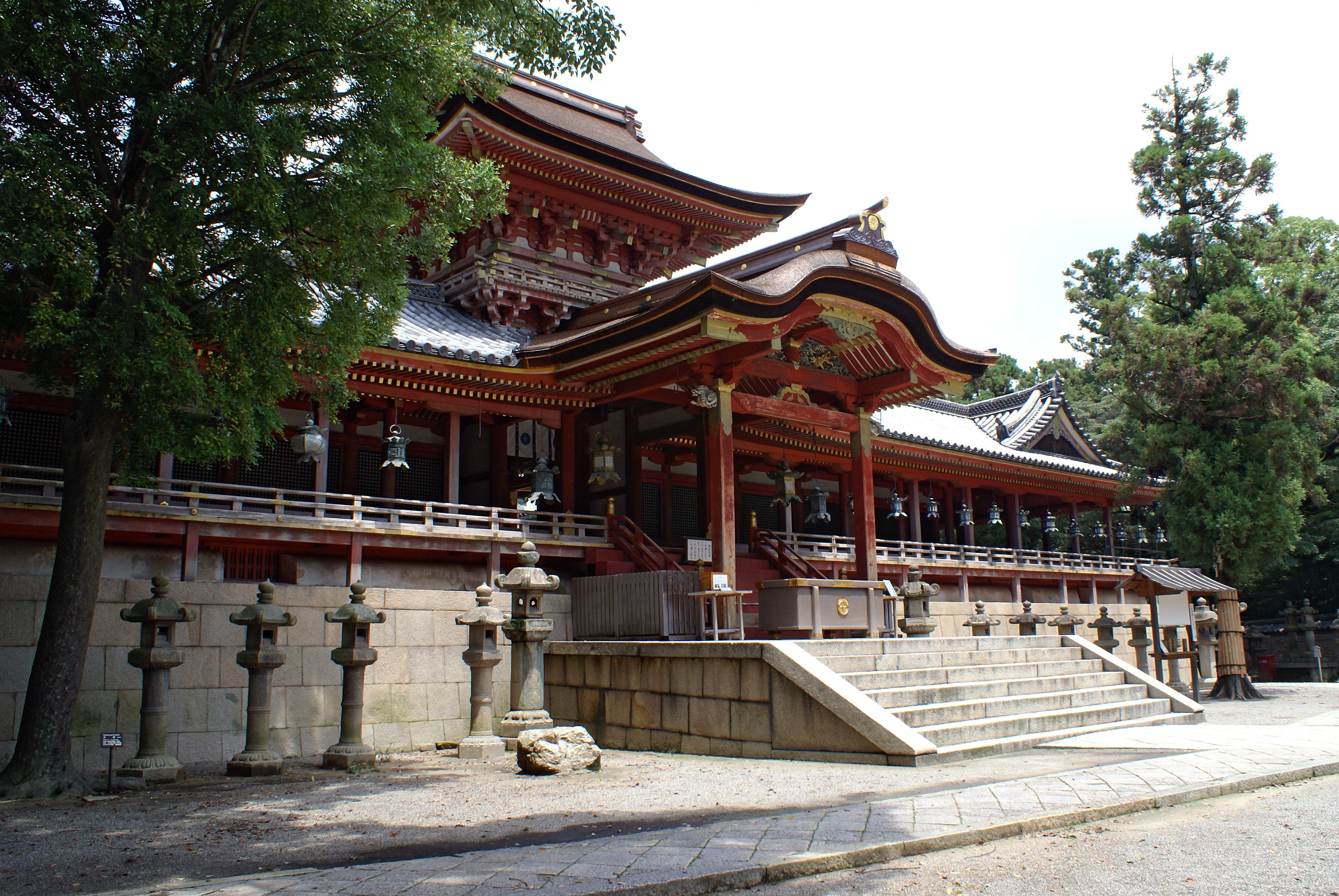
Iwashimizu Hachimangū, a Hachiman shrine in Yawata, Kyoto.

A Hachiman shrine (八幡神社, Hachiman Jinja; also Hachimangū (八幡宮)) is a Shinto shrine dedicated to the kami Hachiman. It is the second most numerous type of Shinto shrine after those dedicated to Inari Ōkami (see Inari shrine). There are about 44,000 Hachiman shrines.

Originally the name 八幡 was read Yawata or Yahata, a reading still used in some cases. Many towns and cities incorporating the names Hachiman, Yawata or Yahata grew around these shrines.

== Famous Hachiman shrines ==
The following four shrines are often grouped into groups of three, either as Usa-Iwashimizu-Hakozaki or Usa-Iwashimizu-Tsurugaoka, and both of these groupings are known as the Three Major Hachiman Shrines of Japan (三大八幡宮).

- Usa Jingū 宇佐神宮 (Usa, Ōita), the Sōhonsha (head shrine)
- Iwashimizu Hachimangū 石清水八幡宮 (Yawata, Kyoto)
- Hakozaki Shrine 筥崎宮 (Fukuoka)
- Tsurugaoka Hachimangū 鶴岡八幡宮 (Kamakura)

== Other notable Hachiman shrines ==
- Fukuyama Hachimangū 福山八幡宮 (Fukuyama, Hiroshima)
- Hakodate Hachiman Shrine 函館八幡宮 (Hakodate, Hokkaido)
- Hatogamine Hachiman Shrine 鳩峰八幡神社 (Tokorozawa, Saitama)
- Iino Hachimangū 飯野八幡宮 (Iwaki, Fukushima)
- Kameyama Hachimangū 亀山八幡宮 (Shimonoseki, Yamaguchi)
- Miyake Hachimangū 三宅八幡宮 (Sakyo-ku, Kyoto)
- Morioka Hachimangū 盛岡八幡宮 (Morioka, Iwate)
- Ōsaki Hachimangū 大崎八幡宮 (Sendai, Miyagi)
- Shiraoi Hachiman Shrine 白老八幡神社 (Shiraoi, Hokkaido)
- Shiroyama Hachimangū 城山八幡宮 (Nagoya)
- Tomioka Hachiman Shrine 富岡八幡宮 (Koto, Tokyo)
- Tamukeyama Hachiman Shrine 手向山八幡宮 (near the Tōdai-ji, Nara)
- Umi Hachiman-gū 宇美八幡宮 (Umi, Fukuoka)
- Ōmiya Hachiman Shrine (Tokyo) 大宮八幡宮 (Suginami, Tokyo)
- Ōmiya Hachiman Shrine (Hyōgo) 大宮八幡宮 (Miki, Hyōgo)
- Ōshio Hachiman Shrine 大塩八幡宮 (Echizen, Fukui)
- Sapporo Hachimangū 札幌八幡宮 Sapporo, Hokkaido
- Saipan Hachiman Shrine (Saipan, Northern Mariana Islands)

== See also ==
- Inari Shrine
