= Flag of Okinawa Prefecture =

Japanese prefectural flag

Okinawa Prefecture

The flag of Okinawa Prefecture (Japanese: 沖縄県旗, Hepburn: Okinawa-ken ki; Okinawan: Uchinaachin hata) is a white field charged in the center with the prefectural emblem, which consists of three circles stacked on top of each other. The two inner circles are positioned upwards; the outermost and innermost circles are red and the middle circle is white. The emblem was adopted on May 15, 1972, when the United States ended its administration of the Ryukyu Islands and returned Okinawa Prefecture to Japan. The flag was adopted shortly afterward on October 13, 1972.

== Design and symbolism ==
The flag is a white field charged in the center with the emblem of Okinawa Prefecture (沖縄県章, Okinawa-ken shō). The emblem consists of three circles stacked on top of each other, alternating between red and white. The inner two circles are positioned upwards. The outermost circle is red and represents the Pacific Ocean, which surrounds Okinawa Prefecture. The middle circle is white and represents the letter O in the rōmaji spelling of "Okinawa". It is also meant to symbolize a circle of people united together. The innermost circle is red and represents the prefecture's potential for development. Accordingly, the Okinawa Prefectural Government describes the emblem itself as "a symbol of the ocean, peace, and development."

According to the prefectural notice that introduced the flag, the emblem's shade of red is Munsell value 3.5R 4/16, or hexadecimal code #C5003B. (Note: Sample:) However, the flag on the prefectural government's official website uses a different shade of red, hexadecimal code #DC000C. (Note: Sample:)

The emblem is a symbol of the Okinawa Prefectural Government and its use is restricted to official government activities and operations. Examples include its display on prefectural appointment letters, awards, publications, and government vehicles, as well as at prefectural housing and prefectural government–sponsored events. The prefectural government noted a number of misuses of the emblem by private enterprises in the 2010s, including direct misuses and the use of similar, adapted designs on products. In response, the prefectural government published an explanation on its website about the history and usage of the emblem.

== History ==
The Empire of Japan transformed its vassal, the Ryukyu Kingdom, into the Ryukyu Domain in 1872 and annexed it outright in 1879, establishing Okinawa Prefecture. Historian Daisaku Kina states that the de jure independent kingdom most likely did not have a national flag as it did not have the Western notion of needing one.

The U.S. militarily occupied the Ryukyu Islands after defeating Japan in the Pacific War of World War II. While the Amami Islands of Kagoshima Prefecture were returned to Japan in 1953, Okinawa Prefecture remained under U.S. administration until 1972. During the period of U.S. rule, the U.S. flag was the only national flag permitted to fly in Okinawa Prefecture.

The Okinawa Civil Government, an indigenous governing body that was created by but nominally independent from the U.S. administration, introduced in January 1950 a Ryukyuan flag designed by the Okinawa Artists' Association. It was a horizontal tricolor of blue, white, and red charged with a white star in the upper hoist-side corner. The flag received little attention from the Okinawan public and its planned adoption was scrapped.

To counter growing calls for Okinawa Prefecture's return to Japan, the U.S. administration created its own Ryukyuan flag in 1954, in hopes of creating a sense of Okinawan identity. The flag's design was based on the family crest of the second Shō dynasty, which had ruled the Ryukyu Kingdom for the kingdom's near entire history. The U.S. administration flew the flag at Ryukyu-American Friendship Centers but soon grew disappointed with the Okinawans' apathy toward the former royal family's symbol. Most visitors to the centers did not even know what the symbol stood for. Realizing that few Okinawans identified with the flag, the U.S. administration discontinued its Ryukyuan flag scheme.

Ryukyuan flag proposed by the Okinawa Civil Government in January 1950

Ryukyuan flag proposed by the U.S. Civil Administration of the Ryukyu Islands in 1954

During the period of U.S. rule, merchant ships from Okinawa Prefecture could not fly the U.S. flag nor the Japanese flag as their civil ensign due to the U.S. administration's ambiguous status under international law. The U.S. administration attempted to remedy this by proclaiming on February 27, 1952, the adoption of a "Ryukyuan ship flag" – a signal flag letter D (Delta) with a triangle at the fly cut off. This caused routine confusion among other ships, culminating in the Kyuyo Maru incident of 1962, in which an Okinawan fishing boat that had entered Indonesian territorial waters was shot at by an Indonesian naval aircraft that could not deduce the boat's nationality. One Okinawan fisherman was killed while four were wounded, resulting in an uproar on the islands and demands for the Japanese flag to be adopted as the Okinawan civil ensign. The issue ultimately made it to the Japan–U.S. Consultative Committee of 1967, in which the two countries agreed that Ryukyuan ships would henceforth fly the Japanese flag alongside a triangular flag with the name "Ryukyus" written in Japanese kanji (琉球) and all caps in English (RYUKYUS).

Civil ensign of the Ryukyu Islands
(1952–1967)

Civil ensign of the Ryukyu Islands
(1967–1972)

After diplomatic meetings in 1969, the U.S. agreed to return Okinawa Prefecture to Japan within three years. Following the signing of the 1971 Okinawa Reversion Agreement, the Japanese government held a public, nationwide competition to design an emblem for the prefecture. A total of 186 designs were submitted. On April 24, 1972, the Prefectural Emblem Selection Committee chose a design submitted by a man from Kyoto Prefecture and decided that the color scheme would be blue, white, and red from the outermost to innermost circle. However, the committee soon discovered that the chosen design and colors resembled the mark of the All Japan Kendo Federation, and so the innermost circle was changed from red to blue on May 9. The emblem became official six days later on May 15, when the Ryukyu Islands were returned to Japan. On October 13, the prefectural government announced the adoption of the prefectural flag and the changing of the prefectural emblem's blue circles to red.

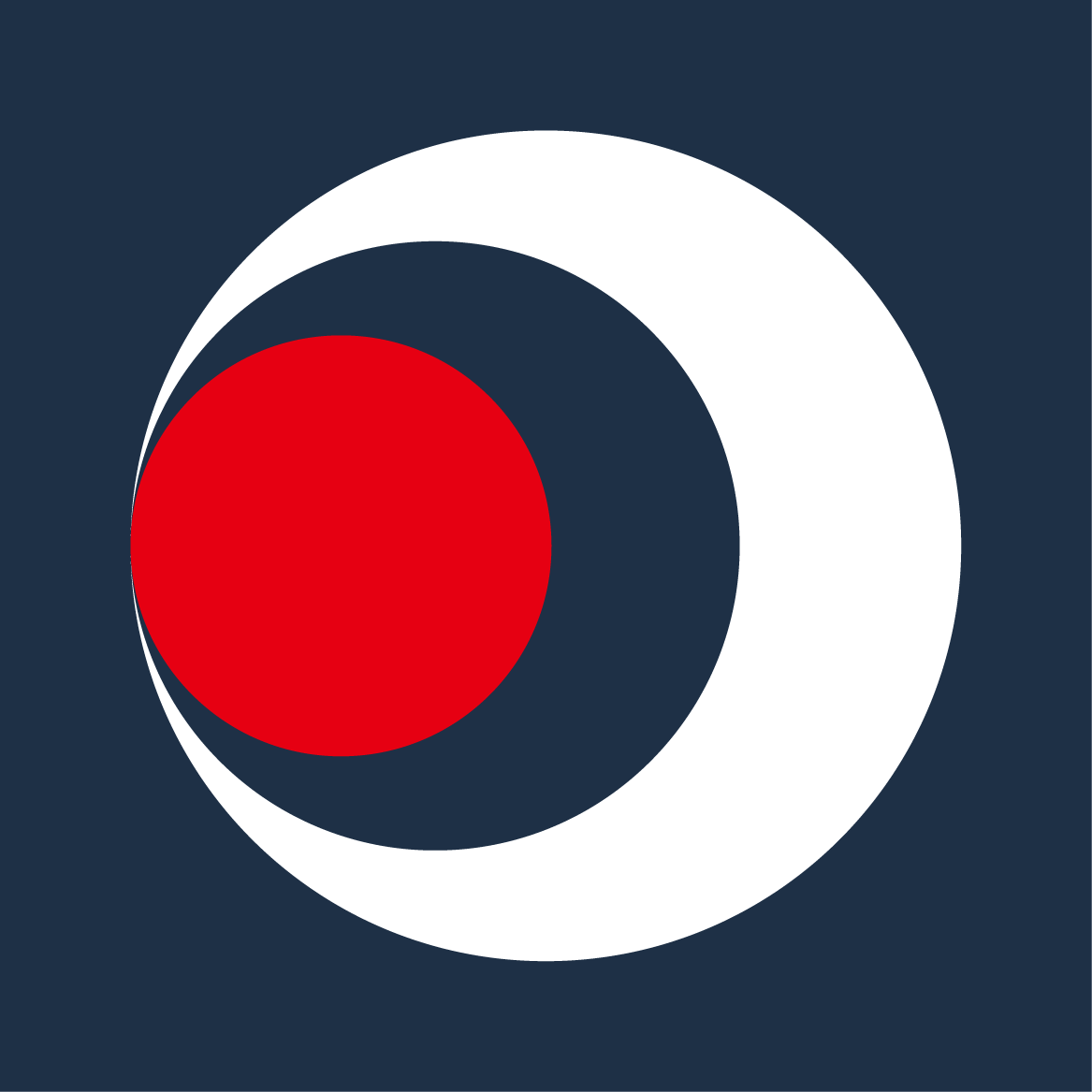
Mark of the All Japan Kendo Federation
(October 1952 – present)

Emblem of Okinawa Prefecture
(initial proposal, never adopted)

Emblem of Okinawa Prefecture
(May 15 – October 13, 1972)

Emblem of Okinawa Prefecture
(October 13, 1972 – present)
