= Jean Herbert =

French interpreter for the UN (1897–1980)

Jean Herbert (France)
- Born: 27 June 1897; France
- Died: 20 August 1980 (aged 83)
- Occupation: Interpreter
- Children: Janine Yates, Yvette Renoux

Jean Herbert was a French Orientalist and one of the first generation of interpreters for the United Nations organization. He was a former chief interpreter of the United Nations interpretation service in New York City.

== Biography ==
Herbert was one of the pioneer, veteran and model consecutive interpreters from the League of Nations and the International Labor Office. His father was an English-speaking Frenchman. He was married to an English woman, with whom he had two daughters, Janine Yates and Yvette Renoux.

Herbert had worked between World War I and World War II for different international organizations. Towards 1930, he became interested in Buddhism and the Far East prompting him to travel to India, China and other Buddhist countries, leading to the authorship of many books related to the Far East such as his Introduction to Asia.

During World War II – in 1939 - Herbert saved 2,000 Alsatians from being shot by the Germans and spent the rest of the war in the French Midi, devoting himself to the study of sacred Hindu texts until he received a telegram from the Minister of Foreign Affairs of France requesting him to go to San Francisco, California for the founding of the United Nations.

Jean Herbert said the interpreter must help people in understanding each other in the highest sense of the words, that is, to give more than a literal translation, so as to convey the deep meaning of what is said. It requires a deep knowledge and a vivid interest for foreign culture, customs, literature, history and ways of life. And that is exactly what Jean Herbert pursued in life.

— Pierre Lambert, U.N. Interpreter, Tribute to Jean Herbert, during a lecture at the Tokyo School of Interpreting, 1982

From San Francisco, Herbert went to the preparatory committee of the U.N. and UNESCO in London. From London, he went to New York to function as chief interpreter. After spending two years in New York, he then moved to Geneva, taking part in the interpreter admission board of the Sorbonne and the Trieste schools.

He published his Manuel de l’interprete (The Interpreter’s Handbook) in 1952. He also founded and directed two collections of multilingual and technical dictionaries published by Elsevier and sponsored by the Universities of Paris, Heidelberg, Mainz, Trieste and Georgetown University. Herbert also became a vice-president – and then president – of the International Association of Conference Interpreters (AIIC) for three years.

After retiring from the United Nations in 1954, Herbert continued freelancing and traveled to the Far East, Madagascar and the Middle East. He held the chair of Eastern Mythologies at the University of Geneva, where he taught from 1954 to 1964.

He wrote Shinto the Fountainhead of Japan with details from visits from 1935 to 1964 and it was published in France in 1964 and in English in 1967

Jean Herbert died in 1980 at the age of 83.

== See also ==
- United Nations Interpretation Service
