= Ichinomiya (disambiguation) =

Ichinomiya (Japanese: 一宮; literally first shrine) is historically the supreme shrine in each of the old provinces of Japan, and currently the name of several places in Japan:

- a city:
  - Ichinomiya, Aichi (Japanese: 一宮市; Ichinomiya-shi) containing the shrine of the old province Owari
    - Owari-Ichinomiya Station along the JR Central Tōkaidō Main Line
    - Meitetsu Ichinomiya Station along the adjacent Meitetsu Main Line
- several towns (Japanese: 一宮町; Ichinomiya-cho or Ichinomiya-machi):
  - Ichinomiya, Chiba containing the shrine of the old province Kazusa
    - Kazusa-Ichinomiya Station, along the JR East Sotobō Line
  - Ichinomiya, Aichi (Mikawa) containing the shrine of the old province Mikawa
    - Mikawa-Ichinomiya Station, along the JR Central Iida Line
  - Ichinomiya, Hyōgo (Shisō) containing the shrine of the old province Harima
  - Ichinomiya, Hyōgo (Tsuna) containing the shrine of the old province Awaji
  - Ichinomiya, Kumamoto containing the shrine of the old province Higo
  - Ichinomiya, Yamanashi containing the shrine of the old province Kai
  - Ichinomiya Castle in Tosa Province, today's Kōchi Prefecture.
