= Umi Hachiman-gū =

Shinto shrine in Fukuoka Prefecture, Japan

Umi Hachimangū 宇美八幡宮
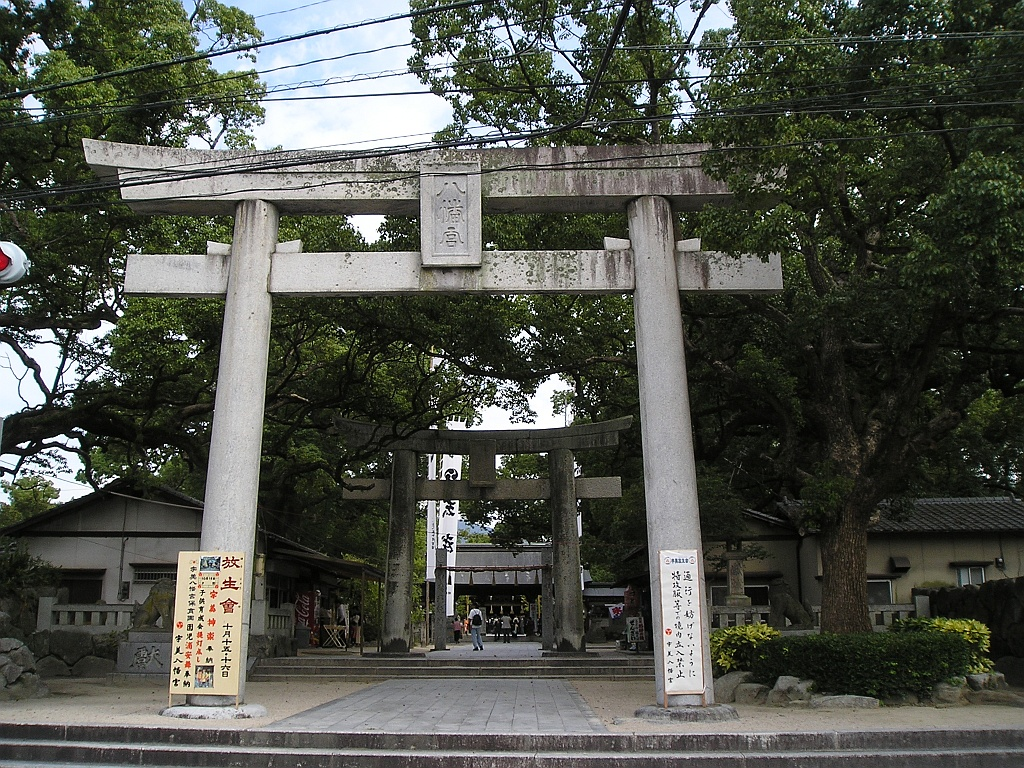
- Torii at Umi Hachimangū

- Location within Japan

Religion
- Affiliation: Shinto
- Deity: Emperor Ōjin; Empress Jingū; Tamayori-bime; Sumiyoshi sanjin Izanagi

Location
- Location: 1-1-1, Umi, Umi; Kasuya District; Fukuoka 811-2101
- Interactive map of Umi Hachimangū 宇美八幡宮
- Coordinates: 33°34′13″N 130°30′32″E

Architecture
- Established: Unknown

Website
- www.umi-hachimangu.or.jp

Umi Hachimangū (宇美八幡宮) is a Shinto shrine located in Umi, Fukuoka prefecture, Japan. It is dedicated to Emperor Ōjin, Empress Jingū, Tamayori-bime, Sumiyoshi sanjin and Izanagi. In the former Modern system of ranked Shinto shrines, it was classified as a prefectural shrine (県社, kensha).

== History ==
The shrine is venerated as the legendary place where Empress Jingū safely gave birth to the future Emperor Ōjin, and is still patronized by those praying for safe childbirth and smooth child rearing.

== Natural Treasures ==
The cluster of giant camphor trees called Kada’s Forest (including the two old camphors that have been deemed Natural Treasures, "Yufuta’s Forest" and "Kinukake’s Forest").

== Gallery ==
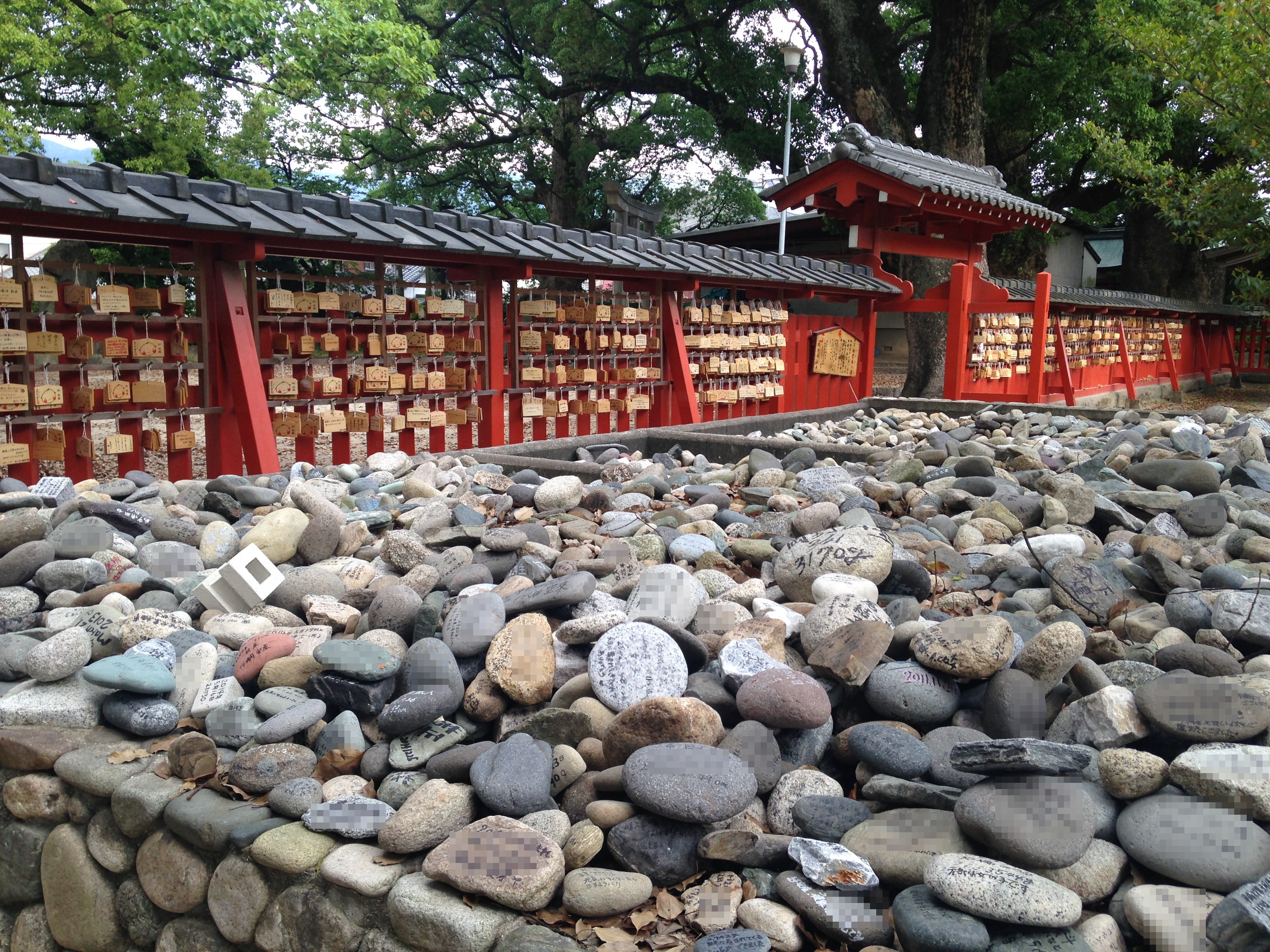
Koyasu-no-ishi (子安の石 lit:The praying stone for safe childbirth and smooth child rearing).

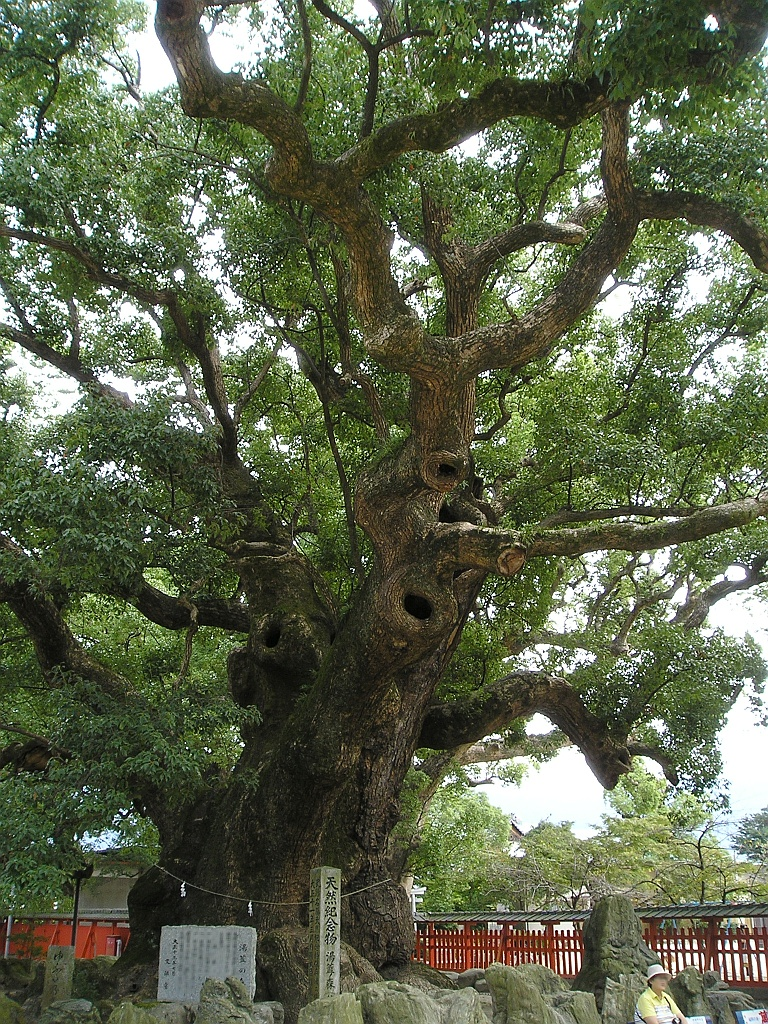
Yufuta's forest, one of the old camphor trees in this shrine, is designated as the National Treasures.

== See also ==
- List of Shinto shrines
