= Hachiman =

Japanese Shinto–Buddhist syncretic deity

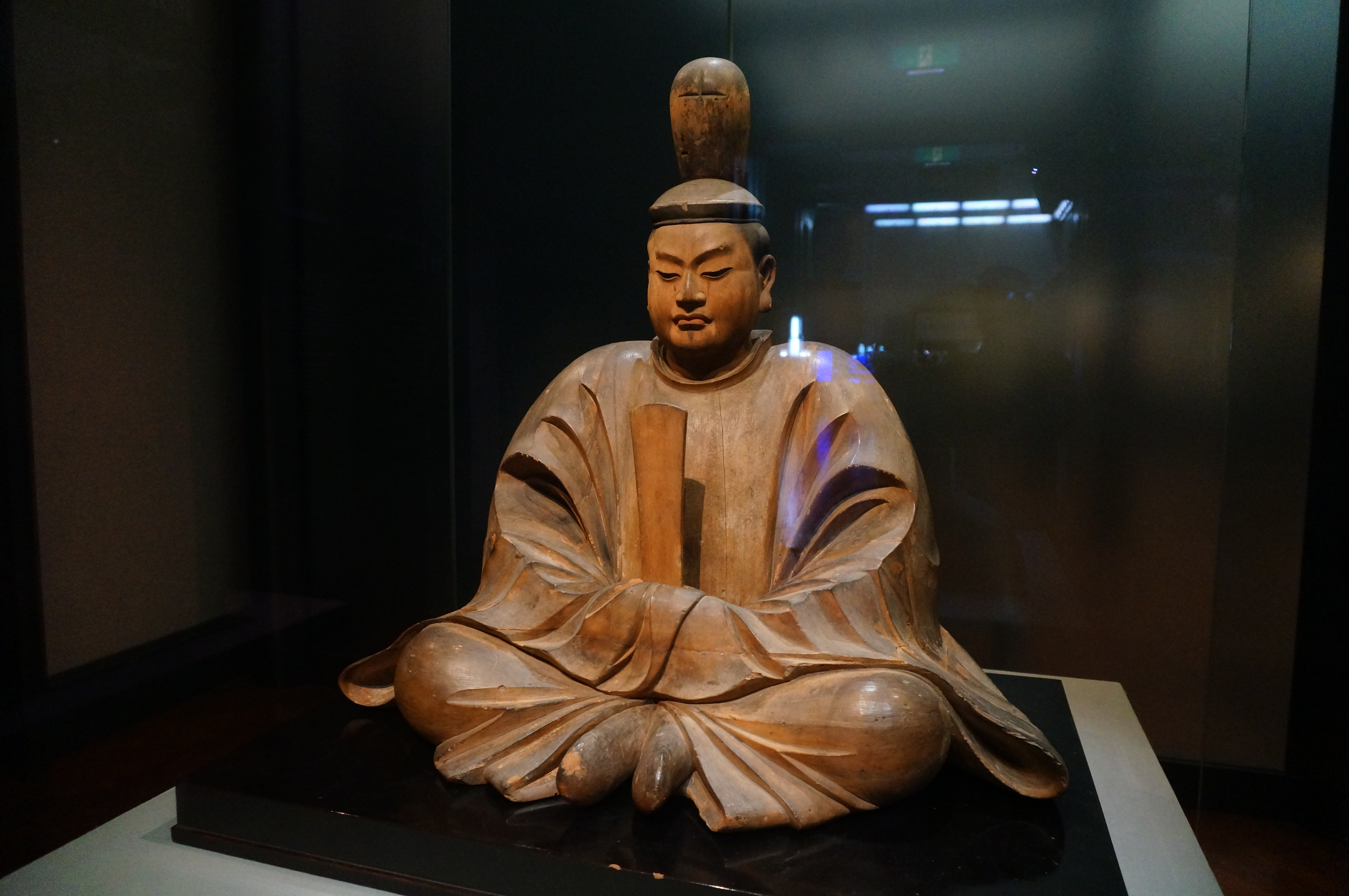
The Shinto deity Hachiman (Kamakura period 1326) at Tokyo National Museum (Lent by Akana Hachimangū), Important Cultural Property

Hachiman (八幡神, Hachiman-shin; also read Hachiman no Kami) is a syncretic Japanese deity identified as the divine spirit of the semi-legendary Emperor Ōjin.

He is regarded as an ancestral kami of the Imperial House of Japan and is worshipped together with Empress Jingū and Hachiman's himegami as the Hachiman Mikami (八幡三神).

Through Shinto–Buddhist syncretism, Hachiman became incorporated into the Buddhist pantheon as Great Bodhisattva Hachiman (八幡大菩薩, Hachiman Daibosatsu) and was widely worshipped as the guardian deity of Buddhist temples.

Beginning in the Heian period, Hachiman became the tutelary kami of the Minamoto clan and was subsequently adopted by the samurai class more broadly. Hachiman worship spread throughout Japan, and about 2,500 shrines are dedicated to him, second in number only to those of Inari.

== Overview ==
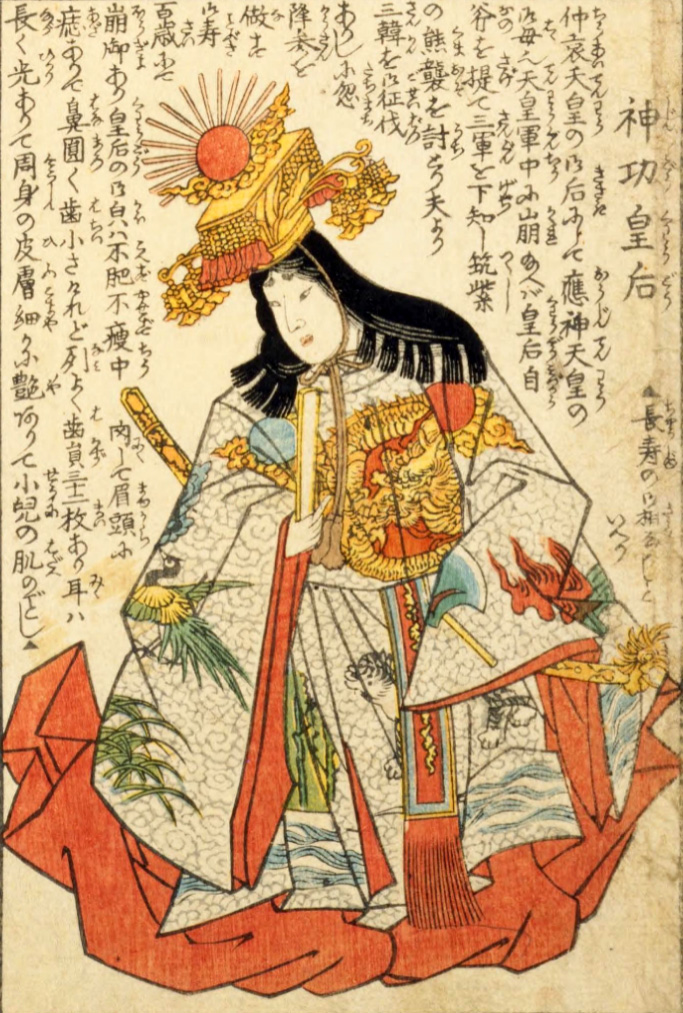
Empress Jingū, mother of Emperor Ōjin

In the present form of Shinto, Hachiman is the divine spirit of Emperor Ōjin. An account in the Fusō Ryakuki of the late Heian period notes a legend that states Hachiman appeared in the form of a three-year-old boy in the Usa region—present-day city of Usa, Oita Prefecture—in 571 AD to a man named Ōga-no-hiki (大神比義) of the Ōga clan and announced himself as Emperor Ōjin. Hachiman, as the spirit of Emperor Ōjin, is often worshipped in conjunction with two kami: Hachiman’s himegami and the spirit of Empress Jingū, Emperor Ōjin's mother, in a trio known as Hachiman Mikami (八幡三神). There are several shrines throughout the country that enshrine the trio, though many of them replace the himegami or Empress Jingū with Emperor Chūai, Takenouchi no Sukune, or Tamayori-hime, and the trio may have the added facet of being kami to pray to for a safe birth (such as at Umi Hachiman-gū).

=== Himegami ===
The exact identity of Hachiman's himegami has long been the subject of speculation.

According to one theory, Hachiman’s himegami is collectively the three Munakata goddesses. The three Munakata goddesses—Tagitsu-hime (多岐津姫命), Ichikishima-hime (市杵嶋姫命) and Tagairi-hime (多紀理姫命)—were said to have descended from heaven to Mount Omoto in the Tsukushi Province. The three Munakata goddesses were worshipped by the mariners of the Munakata clan. It is believed the Munakata clan took up worship of the three Munakata goddesses due to Empress Jingū’s success in the Invasion of the Three Koreas. The three goddesses appeared in the region prior to Hachiman, meaning they are also believed to be the jinushigami of the area.

Other theories have Hachiman's himegami as Tamayori-hime, who was either his consort, aunt, or mother. Some also believe his himegami is the consort of Emperor Ōjin, Nakatsuhime, as Hachiman and Emperor Ōjin began to merge from the Nara period to the Heian period due to writings in the Todai-ji Yōroku (東大寺要録; Todai-ji Records) and Sumiyoshi Taisha Jindai-ki (住吉大社神代記; Sumiyoshi Taisha Records of the Age of the Gods) that present Hachiman as Emperor Ōjin.

Less common theories include the theory that she is Himiko (who is in turn Amaterasu) or that she is Shirayama-hime.

=== Empress Jingū ===
As Emperor Ōjin was already destined to become emperor before he was born, he has been called the Emperor in the Womb (胎中天皇), leading some to interpret the worship of his mother as being based on a combined mother-son worship. The Munakata clan which took part in the Invasion of the Three Koreas worshipped several kami which were enshrined throughout the region, such as the three Munakata goddesses, Sumiyoshi Sanjin, and Amaterasu. It is said that when Empress Jingū visited Tsushima after the invasion, she placed eight flags (yawata) in dedication to the kami, an act which became the origin of the name Hirohata no Yawata no Ōkami (広幡乃八幡大神) (for her son Emperor Ōjin).

== Imperial Ancestral Deity ==
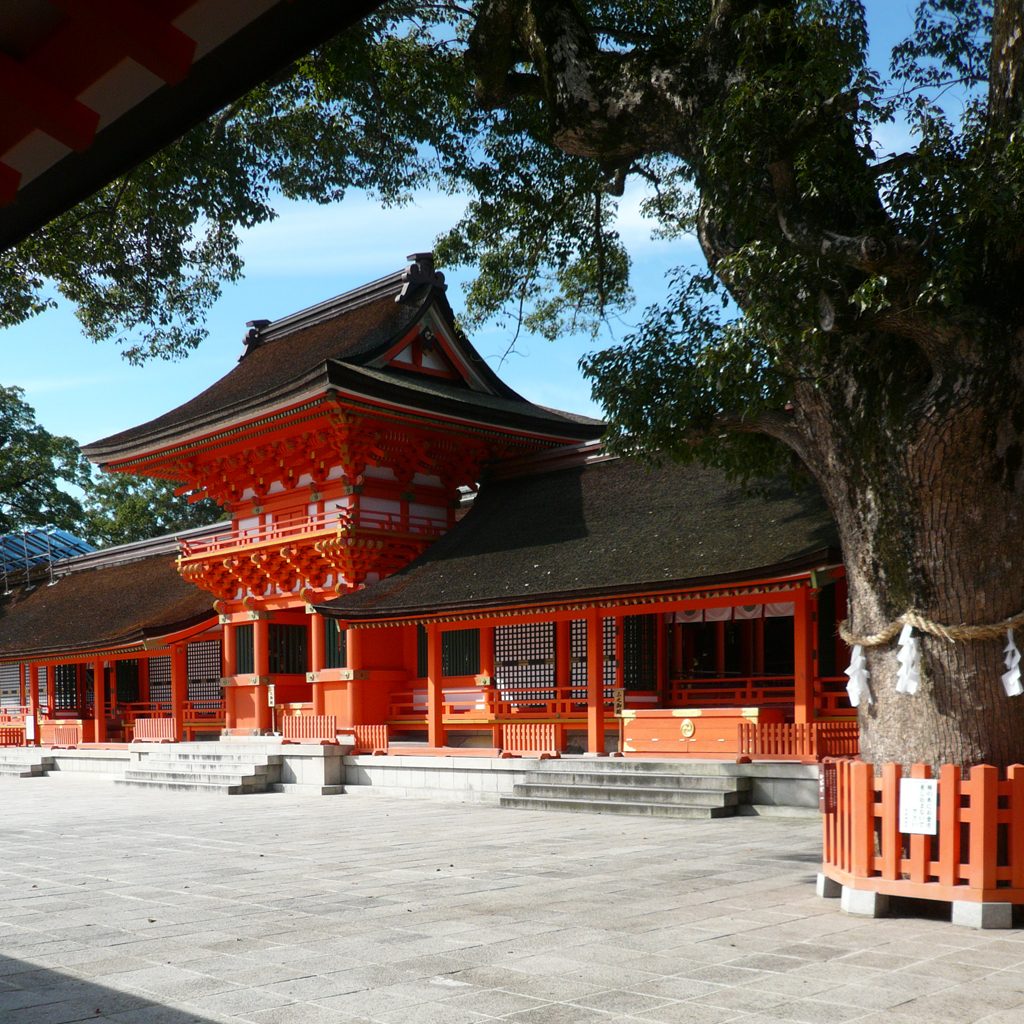
Usa Shrine, at Usa in Oita Prefecture dedicated to Hachiman, founder and patron deity of this city

As Hachiman is believed to be Emperor Ōjin, he is also considered the ancestral kami of the imperial family. In the Jōkyū-ki (承久記; Chronicle of the Jōkyū Era), it is stated, “The imperial throne of Japan is given on the good offices of the Great Kami Amaterasu of Ise and the Great Boddhisattva Hachiman,” placing Hachiman as a guardian deity of the imperial family second only to Amaterasu.

Emperor Ōjin has long been believed to be connected to the founding of the Konda Hachiman Shrine, and, in addition to worshipping at Ise Shrine, the imperial family worships their ancestral spirits at Hachiman shrines such as Usa Shrine and Iwashimizu Hachimangū.

== Shinto-Buddhist Syncretism of Hachiman ==
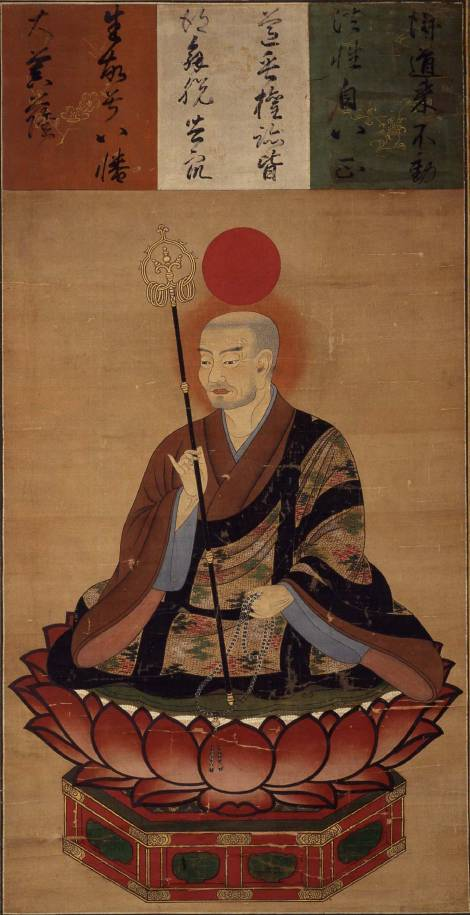
The Buddhist Sogyō Hachiman depicted in the attire of a Buddhist monk, syncretised from the Shinto deity Hachiman

After the arrival of Buddhism in Japan, Hachiman became a syncretistic deity, fusing elements of the native kami worship with Buddhism (shinbutsu-shūgō). In the 8th century AD, he joined the Buddhist pantheon as Great Bodhisattva Hachiman (八幡大菩薩, Hachiman Daibosatsu) where his jinja (神社 – Shinto shrines) and jingu (神宮 – Shinto shrine of the Imperial family) were incorporated into shrines in Buddhist temples (寺 tera).

This merging with Buddhism can be seen early in history as shown in an record from 749, while the Great Buddha of Tōdai-ji was being constructed in Nara, of a story claiming that priestess and Buddhist nun (禰宜尼, negini) Ōga no Morime (大神杜女) of Usa Hachiman Shrine travelled in a procession to Nara where Hachiman spoke through her to announce he would support the construction.

In 781, the imperial court granted Hachiman of Usa the title of Great Bodhisattva Hachiman as a Buddhist protective deity believed to guard the country. This led to Hachiman being propagated as the chinjugami of Buddhist temples throughout the country. Additionally, under the honji suijaku theory, Hachiman’s honji (本地; lit. "original ground") was believed to be Amitābha. However, the Japanese Buddhist monk Nichiren claimed instead that Hachiman’s honji was Gautama Buddha.

Usa Hachiman-gū's own foundation is traditionally linked to an act of atonement: after the Hayato people of Ōsumi and Hyūga rose in revolt in 720 and were suppressed with great loss of life, the shrine is said to have been established to atone for the killing, a story later retold at Hachiman shrines throughout the country. Some decades later, in 769, the courtier Wake no Kiyomaro received a divine oracle (takusen) from Hachiman that thwarted the Buddhist monk Dōkyō's scheme to usurp the imperial throne, an episode credited with reinforcing Hachiman's role as guardian deity of the imperial house.

Beginning in the Heian period, Hachiman began to receive worship from warriors such as the Seiwa Genji and the Taira Heishi which led to the spread of Hachiman shrines throughout the country. However, when the honji suijaku theory became more widespread, Hachiman was depicted in the clothes of a Buddhist monk, resulting in him becoming known as Hachiman the Kami in Buddhist Attire (僧形八幡神, Sōgyō Hachiman-shin)

== Worship of Hachiman by the samurai ==
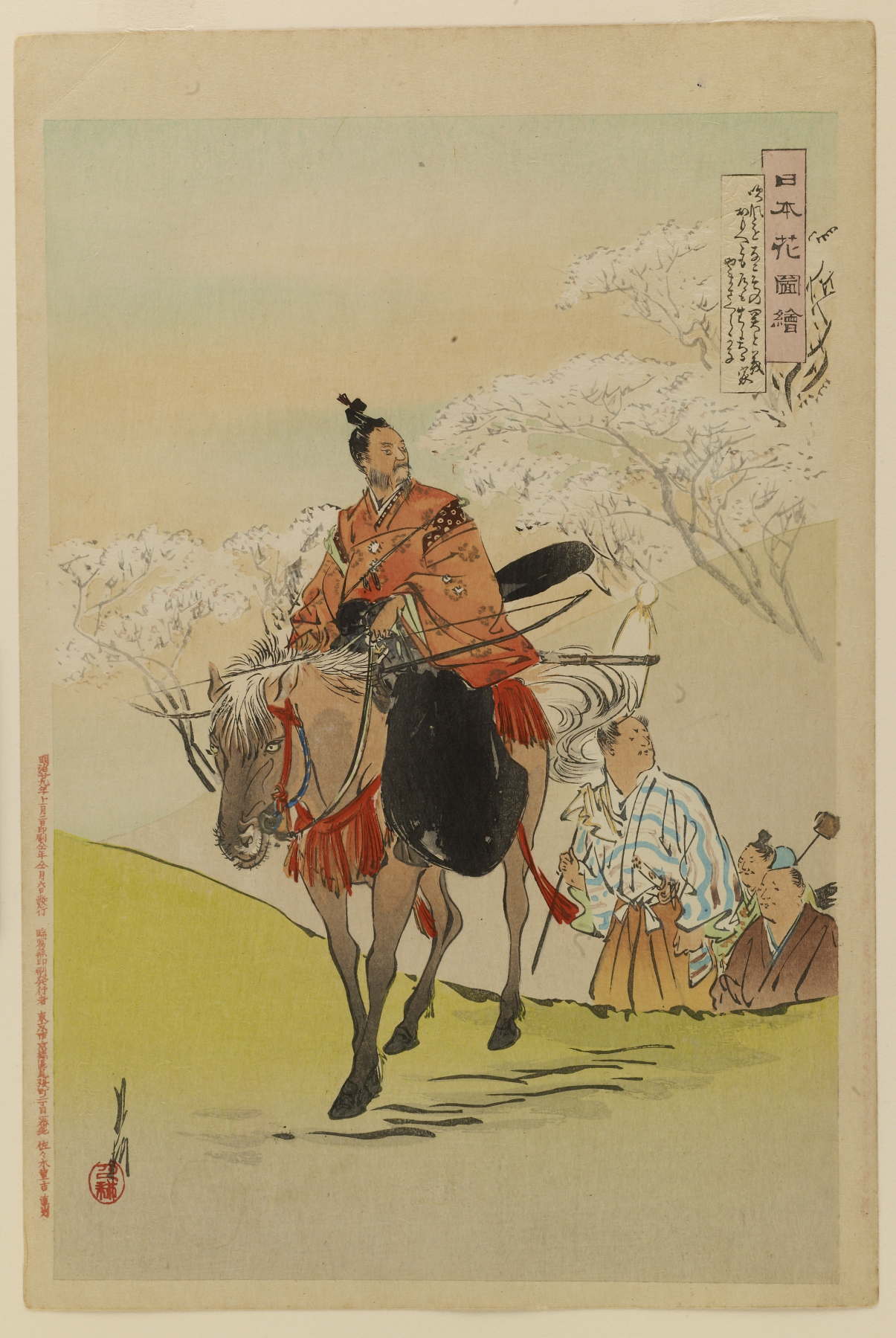
The great 11th-century warrior Hachimantarō Yoshiie avatar of Hachiman has just emerged from a mountain pass surrounded by cherry trees. In the cartouche appears the poem he wrote on the occasion: "If Come-Not Gate is not a windy place, why do cherry blossoms cover the path?"

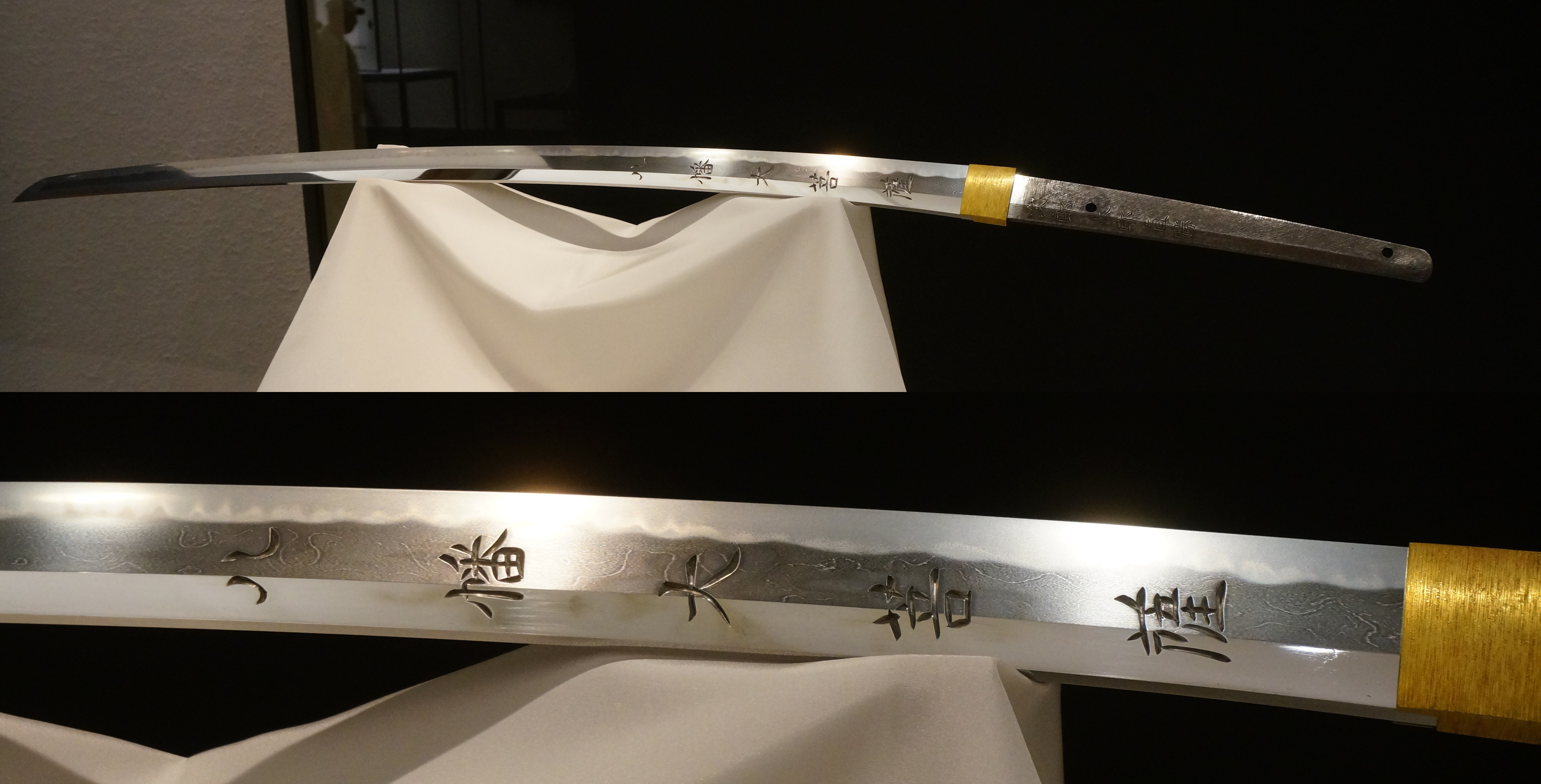
This is a katana forged by Jirotaro Naokatsu in 1838 of the Edo period, and the words Hachiman Daibosatsu (Great Bodhisattva Hachiman) are engraved on the blade.

Because Emperor Ōjin was an ancestor of the Minamoto warrior clan, Hachiman became its tutelary kami (氏神, ujigami). Minamoto no Yoshiie, upon coming of age at Iwashimizu Shrine in Kyoto, took the name Hachiman Taro Yoshiie, and, through his military prowess and virtue as a leader, came to be regarded and respected as the ideal samurai through the ages. After Minamoto no Yoritomo became shōgun and established the Kamakura shogunate, Hachiman's popularity grew and he became by extension the protector of the warrior class that the shōgun had brought to power. For this reason, the shintai of a Hachiman shrine is usually a stirrup or a bow.

Following the establishment of the Kamakura shogunate, the worship of Hachiman spread throughout Japan among not only samurai, but also the peasantry. There are now about 2,500 Shinto shrines dedicated to Hachiman, who has more shrines dedicated to him than any other deity except Inari. Usa Shrine in Usa, Ōita Prefecture is head shrine of all these shrines; other important Hachiman shrines are Iwashimizu Hachiman-gū, Hakozaki-gū and Tsurugaoka Hachiman-gū.

Hachiman's mon (emblem) is a mitsudomoe, a round whirlpool or vortex with three heads swirling right or left. Many samurai clans used this mon as their own, including some that traced their ancestry back to the mortal enemy of the Minamoto, the Emperor Kanmu of the Taira clan (Japanese: 桓武平氏, Kanmu Heishi).

== See also ==
- Bishamon—Shinto-Buddhist God of War
- Hachiman shrine
- Heki Danjō Masatsugu
- Hitogami
- Kamikaze (typhoon)
- Minamoto no Yorinobu
- Minamoto no Yoriyoshi
- Tachibana Dōsetsu
- Tōdai-ji Hachiman
