= Nagata =

Nagata may refer to:

== People ==
- Nagata (surname), a family name of Japanese and Fijian origin

== Places ==
- Mount Nagata, a mountain in Antarctica
- Nagata-ku, Kobe, a ward in the city of Kobe
- Nagata Shrine, a Shinto shrine in Nagata-ku
- Nagata Station (disambiguation), a number of Japanese railway stations

== Mathematics ==
- Nagata–Biran conjecture, an algebraic formula
- Nagata dimension or Assouad-Nagata dimension, a notion of dimension for metric spaces
- Nagata ring, an integral domain in algebra
- Nagata–Smirnov metrization theorem characterizes when a topological space is metrizable
- Nagata's compactification theorem, an algebraic formula
- Nagata's conjecture, an algebraic formula
- Nagata's conjecture on curves, an algebraic formula

== Other uses ==
- Nagata Acoustics, a Japanese consultancy, specialising in concert halls
- Nagata Maru, a Japanese cargo ship and naval auxiliary, built in 1937

== See also ==
- Nagatachō, Tokyo, district in Tokyo's Chiyoda Ward
