= Nagata (surname) =

Nagata is a surname which can be either of Japanese (written: 永田 or 長田) or Fijian origin. Notable people with the surname include:

- Akira Nagata (born 1985), Japanese vocalist and actor
- Alipate Nagata, Fijian politician
- Anna Nagata (born 1982), Japanese actress
- Apisai Nagata, Fijian rugby union footballer
- Hidejirō Nagata (1876–1943), politician and cabinet minister in the Empire of Japan
- Hideo Nagata (1885–1949), Japanese poet and playwright
- Hiroko Nagata (1945–2011), Japanese leftist radical
- Hiroshi Nagata (1907–1961), Japanese field hockey player
- Hisayasu Nagata (1969–2009), Japanese politician
- Hisayoshi Nagata (born 1962), Japanese former water polo player
- Iroha Nagata (born 1998), Japanese rugby player
- Jun-iti Nagata (1925–2007), Japanese mathematician
- Kabi Nagata (born 1987), Japanese manga artist
- Nijiho Nagata (born 2000), Japanese rugby player
- Katsuhiko Nagata (born 1973), Japanese Olympic wrestler and mixed martial artist
- Kazuhiko Nagata (born 1964), Japanese engineer, driver, and entrepreneur (Top Secret)
- Linda Nagata (born 1960), American science fiction author
- Masaichi Nagata (1906–1985), Japanese film producer and baseball executive
- Masayoshi Nagata (1927–2008), Japanese mathematician
- Maya Nagata
- Michael K. Nagata, U.S. Army officer
- Mikihiko Nagata (1887–1964), Japanese poet and playwright
- Mitsuru Nagata (born 1983), Japanese football player
- Moe Nagata (永田 萌絵; born 1997), Japanese women's basketball player
- Mutsuko Nagata (born 1976), Japanese former basketball player
- Nanae Nagata (1956–2009), Japanese long-distance runner
- Reina Nagata (born 1992), Japanese beauty pageant winner
- Ryōko Nagata (born 1975), Japanese voice actress
- Ryota Nagata (born 1985), Japanese football player
- Shigekazu Nagata (born 1949), Japanese molecular biologist
- Shiori Nagata (born 1987), Japanese handball player
- Takashi Nagata (born 1972), former Japanese football player
- Takeshi Nagata (1913–1991), Japanese geophysicist
- Takuya Nagata (born 1990), Japanese football defender
- Takuya Nagata (born 1994), Japanese athlete
- Tetsuo Nagata (born 1952), Japanese cinematographer
- Tetsuzan Nagata (1884–1935), Japanese soldier and politician
- Tokuhon Nagata (1512 - 1630), a medieval Japanese physician
- Toshihisa Nagata (長田 利久; born 1945), Japanese bobsledder
- Yasujiro Nagata (1867–1923) Imperial Japanese Navy admiral
- Yoshitaro Nagata (永田 吉太郎; born 1929), Japanese boxer
- Yuji Nagata (born 1968), Japanese professional wrestler

== See also ==
- Nagata. for other uses
