= Hisayoshi =

- Gender: Male

Origin
- Origin: Japanese
- Meaning: Different meanings depending on the kanji used

Hisayoshi (written: 久義, 久佳, 久喜 or 久吉) is a masculine Japanese given name. Notable people with the name include:

- Hisayoshi Chōno (長野 久義; born 1984), Japanese baseball player
- Hisayoshi Harasawa (原沢 久喜; born 1992), Japanese judoka
- Hisayoshi Nagata (永田 久喜; born 1962), Japanese water polo player
- Hisayoshi Ogura (小倉 久佳; born 1959), Japanese musician and composer
- Hisayoshi Sato (佐藤 久佳; born 1987), Japanese swimmer
- Hisayoshi Suganuma (菅沼 久義; born 1978), Japanese voice actor
- Hisayoshi Takeda (武田 久吉; 1883–1972), Japanese botanist
- Hisayoshi Tanaka (田中 久喜; born 1979), Japanese swimmer
