= Claude Chevalley =

French mathematician (1909–1984)

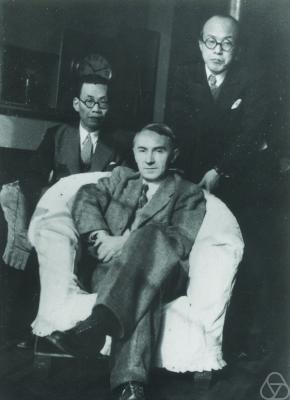
- Y. Akizuki, C. Chevalley and A. Kobori
- Born: 11 February 1909; Johannesburg, Transvaal Colony (now South Africa)
- Died: 28 June 1984 (aged 75); Paris, France
- Citizenship: French, American
- Education: École Normale Supérieure; University of Hamburg; University of Marburg; University of Paris
- Known for: Founding member of Bourbaki; Chevalley–Warning theorem Chevalley group Chevalley scheme
- Scientific career
- Fields: Mathematics
- Workplaces: Princeton University; Columbia University
- Notable students: Michel André; Michel Broué; Leon Ehrenpreis; Oscar Goldman; Gerhard Hochschild; Lê Dũng Tráng

Claude Chevalley (French: [ʃəvalɛ]; 11 February 1909 – 28 June 1984) was a French mathematician who made important contributions to number theory, algebraic geometry, class field theory, finite group theory and the theory of algebraic groups. He was a founding member of the Bourbaki group.

== Life ==
His father, Abel Chevalley, was a French diplomat who, jointly with his wife Marguerite Chevalley née Sabatier, wrote The Concise Oxford French Dictionary. Chevalley graduated from the École Normale Supérieure in 1929, where he studied under Émile Picard. He then spent time at the University of Hamburg, studying under Emil Artin and at the University of Marburg, studying under Helmut Hasse. In Germany, Chevalley discovered Japanese mathematics in the person of Shokichi Iyanaga. Chevalley was awarded a doctorate in 1933 from the University of Paris for a thesis on class field theory.

When World War II broke out, Chevalley was at Princeton University. After reporting to the French Embassy, he stayed in the U.S., first at Princeton and then (after 1947) at Columbia University. His American students included Leon Ehrenpreis and Gerhard Hochschild. During his time in the U.S., Chevalley became an American citizen and wrote a substantial part of his lifetime's output in English.

When Chevalley applied for a chair at the Sorbonne, the difficulties he encountered were the subject of a polemical piece by his friend and fellow Bourbakiste André Weil, titled "Science Française?" and published in the Nouvelle Revue Française. Chevalley was the "professeur B" of the piece, as confirmed in the endnote to the reprint in Weil's collected works, Oeuvres Scientifiques, tome II. Chevalley eventually did obtain a position in 1957 at the faculty of sciences of the University of Paris and after 1970 at the Université de Paris VII.

Chevalley had artistic and political interests, and was a minor member of the French non-conformists of the 1930s. The following quote by the co-editor of Chevalley's collected works attests to these interests:

"Chevalley was a member of various avant-garde groups, both in politics and in the arts... Mathematics was the most important part of his life, but he did not draw any boundary between his mathematics and the rest of his life."

== Work ==
In his PhD thesis, Chevalley made an important contribution to the technical development of class field theory, removing a use of L-functions and replacing it by an algebraic method. At that time use of group cohomology was implicit, cloaked by the language of central simple algebras. In the introduction to André Weil's Basic Number Theory, Weil attributed the book's adoption of that path to an unpublished manuscript by Chevalley.

Around 1950, Chevalley wrote a three-volume treatment of Lie groups. A few years later, he published the work for which he is best remembered, his investigation into what are now called Chevalley groups. Chevalley groups make up 9 of the 18 families of finite simple groups.

Chevalley's accurate discussion of integrality conditions in the Lie algebras of semisimple groups enabled abstracting their theory from the real and complex fields. As a consequence, analogues over finite fields could be defined. This was an essential stage in the evolving classification of finite simple groups. After Chevalley's work, the distinction between "classical groups" falling into the Dynkin diagram classification, and sporadic groups which did not, became sharp enough to be useful. What are called 'twisted' groups of the classical families could be fitted into the picture.

"Chevalley's theorem" (also called the Chevalley–Warning theorem) usually refers to his result on the solubility of equations over a finite field. Another theorem of his concerns the constructible sets in algebraic geometry, i.e. those in the Boolean algebra generated by the Zariski-open and Zariski-closed sets. It states that the image of such a set by a morphism of algebraic varieties is of the same type. Logicians call this an elimination of quantifiers.

In the 1950s, Chevalley led some Paris seminars of major importance: the Séminaire Cartan–Chevalley of the academic year 1955-6, with Henri Cartan and the Séminaire Chevalley of 1956-7 and 1957-8. These dealt with topics on algebraic groups and the foundations of algebraic geometry, as well as pure abstract algebra. The Cartan–Chevalley seminar was the genesis of scheme theory, but its subsequent development in the hands of Alexander Grothendieck was so rapid, thorough and inclusive that its historical tracks can appear well covered. Grothendieck's work subsumed the more specialised contribution of Serre, Chevalley, Gorō Shimura and others such as Erich Kähler and Masayoshi Nagata.

== Recognition ==
The American Mathematical Society established the Chevalley Prize in Lie Theory in 2014, with the first recipient being Geordie Williamson in 2016.

- 2016 Geordie Williamson
- 2018 Dennis Gaitsgory
- 2020 Huanchen Bao, Weiqiang Wang
- 2022 Xuhua He
- 2024 Victor Ostrik
- 2026 Tasho Kaletha, Zhiwei Yun

== Selected bibliography ==
- 1936. L'Arithmetique dans les Algèbres de Matrices. Hermann, Paris.
- 1940. "La théorie du corps de classes," Annals of Mathematics 41: 394–418.
- 1946. Theory of Lie groups. Princeton University Press.
- 1951. "Théorie des groupes de Lie, tome II, Groupes algébriques", Hermann, Paris.
- 1951. Introduction to the theory of algebraic functions of one variable, A.M.S. Math. Surveys VI.
- 1954. The algebraic theory of spinors, Columbia Univ. Press; new edition, Springer-Verlag, 1997.
- 1953–1954. Class field theory, Nagoya University.
- 1955. "Théorie des groupes de Lie, tome III, Théorèmes généraux sur les algèbres de Lie", Hermann, Paris.
- 1955, "Sur certains groupes simples," Tôhoku Mathematical Journal 7: 14–66.
- 1955. The construction and study of certain important algebras, Publ. Math. Soc. Japan.
- 1956. Fundamental concepts of algebra, Acad. Press.
- 1956–1958. "Classification des groupes de Lie algébriques", Séminaire Chevalley, Secrétariat Math., 11 rue P. Curie, Paris; revised edition by P.Cartier, Springer-Verlag, 2005.
- 1958. Fondements de la géométrie algébrique, Secrétariat Math., 11 rue P. Curie, Paris.

== See also ==
- Idèle
- Valuative criterion of properness
- Chevalley group
- Chevalley scheme
- Chevalley–Iwahori–Nagata theorem
- Beck–Chevalley condition
- Non-conformist movement
- Jordan–Chevalley decomposition
