= Chevalley scheme =

A Chevalley scheme in algebraic geometry was a precursor notion of scheme theory.

Let X be a separated integral noetherian scheme, R its function field. If we denote by $X'$ the set of subrings $\mathcal O_x$ of R, where x runs through X (when $X=\mathrm{Spec}(A)$, we denote $X'$ by $L(A)$), $X'$ verifies the following three properties:

- For each $M\in X'$, R is the field of fractions of M.
- There is a finite set of noetherian subrings $A_i$ of R so that $X'=\cup_i L(A_i)$ and that, for each pair of indices i,j, the subring $A_{ij}$ of R generated by $A_i \cup A_j$ is an $A_i$-algebra of finite type.
- If $M\subseteq N$ in $X'$ are such that the maximal ideal of M is contained in that of N, then M=N.

Originally, Chevalley also supposed that R was an extension of finite type of a field K and that the $A_i$'s were algebras of finite type over a field too (this simplifies the second condition above).

== Bibliography ==
- Grothendieck, Alexandre; Jean Dieudonné (1960). "Éléments de géométrie algébrique". Publications Mathématiques de l'IHÉS. I. Le langage des schémas: I.8. Online
