= Paul Biran =

Israeli mathematician

- פאול בירן
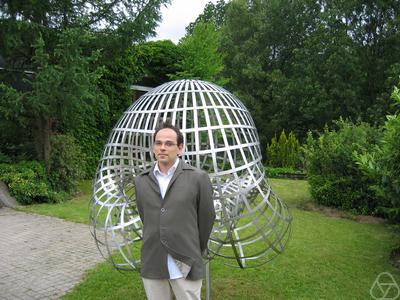
- Born: 25 February 1969 (age 57); Bucharest, Romania
- Education: Tel Aviv University
- Known for: Nagata–Biran conjecture
- Awards: Erdős Prize (2006); EMS Prize (2004); Oberwolfach Prize (2003)
- Scientific career
- Fields: Mathematics
- Workplaces: ETH Zurich
- Doctoral advisor: Leonid Polterovich

Paul Ian Biran (Hebrew: פאול בירן; born 25 February 1969) is an Israeli mathematician. He holds a chair at ETH Zurich. His research interests include symplectic geometry and algebraic geometry.

== Education ==
Born in Romania in 1969, Biran's family moved to Israel in 1971. He attended Tel Aviv University, where he earned his Bachelor's degree in 1994 and Ph.D. in 1997 under supervision of Leonid Polterovich (thesis: Geometry of Symplectic Packing).

== Career ==
From 1997 to 1999, Biran was a "Szego Assistant Professor" at Stanford University. At Tel Aviv University, he was a lecturer from 1997 to 2001, a senior lecturer from 2001 to 2005, an associate professor in 2005, and a full professor in 2008. In 2009, Biran became a full professor of mathematics at ETH Zurich.

== Awards ==
Biran was awarded the Oberwolfach Prize in 2003, the EMS Prize in 2004, and the Erdős Prize in 2006. In 2013 he became a member of the German Academy of Sciences Leopoldina.

== Publications ==
- Salamon, Dietmar; Polterovich, Leonid; Biran, Paul (2003). "Propagation in Hamiltonian dynamics and relative symplectic homology". Duke Mathematical Journal. 119 (1): 65–118. arXiv:math/0108134. doi:10.1215/s0012-7094-03-11913-4. MR 1991647. S2CID 17473995.
- Biran, Paul; Cornea, Octav (2009). "Rigidity and uniruling for Lagrangian submanifolds". Geometry & Topology. 13 (5): 2881–2989. arXiv:0808.2440. doi:10.2140/gt.2009.13.2881. MR 2546618.

== See also ==
- Nagata–Biran conjecture
