= Chevalley–Iwahori–Nagata theorem =

In mathematics, the Chevalley–Iwahori–Nagata theorem states that if a linear algebraic group G is acting linearly on a finite-dimensional vector space V, then the map from V/G to the spectrum of the ring of invariant polynomials is an isomorphism if this ring is finitely generated and all orbits of G on V are closed (Dieudonné & Carrell 1970, p.53, 1971, p.55). It is named after Claude Chevalley, Nagayoshi Iwahori, and Masayoshi Nagata.
