= Nagata Station =

Nagata Station is the name of eight train stations in Japan:

- Nagata Station (Saitama) (永田駅) - in Fukaya, Saitama, on the Chichibu Main Line
- Nagata Station (Chiba) (永田駅) - in Oamishirasato, Sanbu District, Chiba, on the JR East Sotobo Line
- Nagata Station (Osaka) (長田駅) - in Higashiosaka, Osaka, on the Osaka Municipal Subway Chuo Line and the Kintetsu Keihanna Line
- Nagata Station (Kobe Municipal Subway) (長田駅) - in Nagata-ku, Kobe, on the Kobe Municipal Subway Seishin-Yamate Line,
- Nagata Station (Shintetsu) (長田駅) - in Nagata-ku, Kobe, on the Kobe Electric Railway Arima Line
- Kosoku Nagata Station (高速長田駅) - in Nagata-ku, Kobe, on the Hanshin Railway Kobe Kosoku Line, close to Nagata Station on the Kobe Subway Seishin-Yamate Line
- Kii-Nagata Station (紀伊長田駅) - in Kinokawa, Wakayama, on the JR West Wakayama Line
- Hizen-Nagata Station (肥前長田駅) - in Isahaya, Nagasaki, on the JR Kyushu Nagasaki Main Line
