= Hirose Taisha =

Shinto shrine in Nara Prefecture, Japan

Hirose-taisha 廣瀬大社
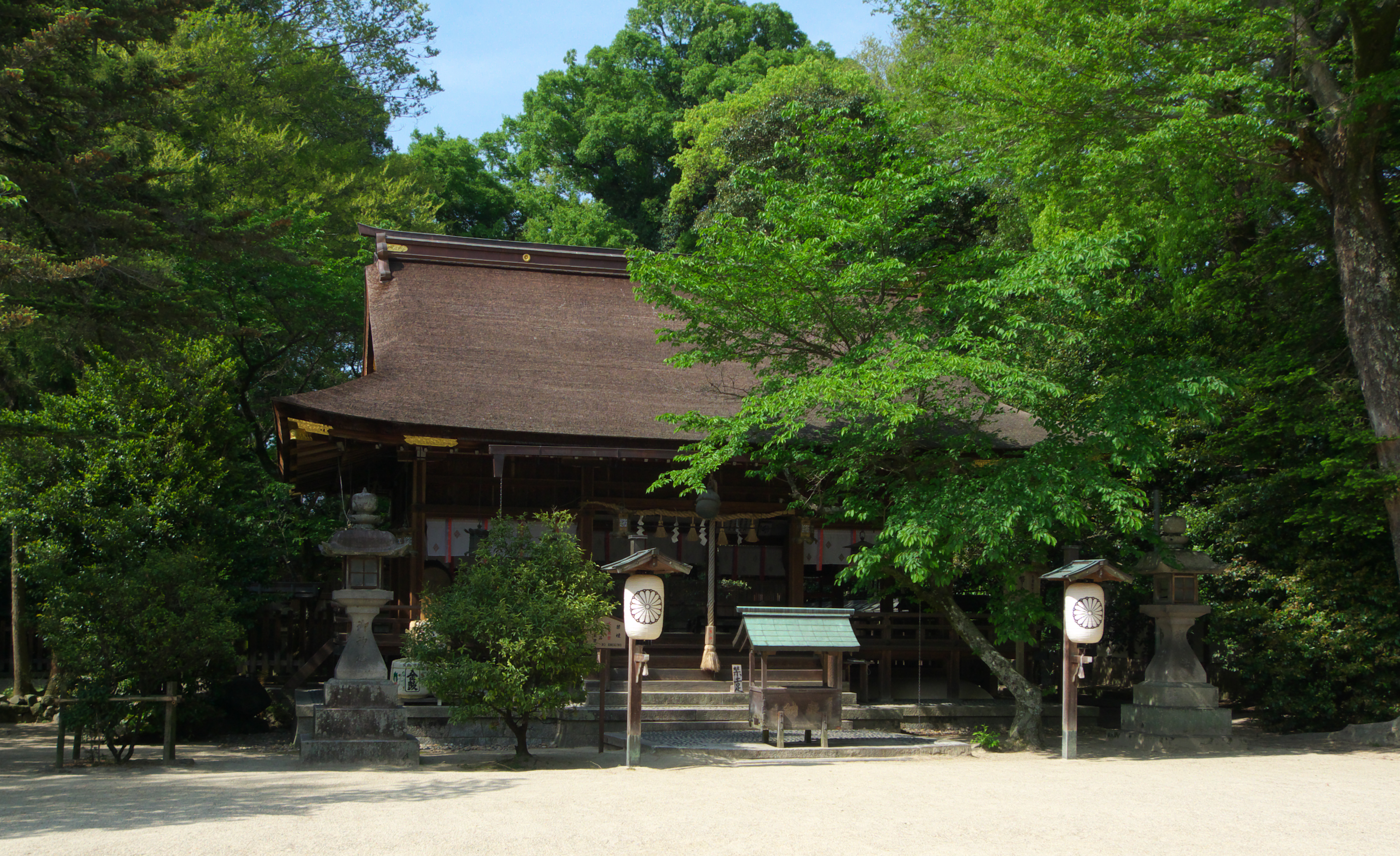
- Haiden, or the prayer hall

- Location within Japan

Religion
- Affiliation: Shinto
- Deity: Wakaukanome-no-mikoto, Kushitama-no-mikoto, and Honoikaduchi-no-mikoto
- Festivals: Sunakake-matsuri (February 11th), Reisai (April 4th), and Õimi-no-matsuri (August 21st)

Location
- Location: 99 Kawai, Kawai-cho, Kitakatsuragi-gun, Nara Prefecture, Japan
- Interactive map of Hirose-taisha 廣瀬大社
- Coordinates: 34°35′30″N 135°44′54″E

Architecture
- Style: Kasuga-zukuri
- Founder: Emperor Sujin (allegedly) /; Emperor Tenmu
- Established: 69 BC (allegedly) /; 675

Website
- www.hirosetaisya.com

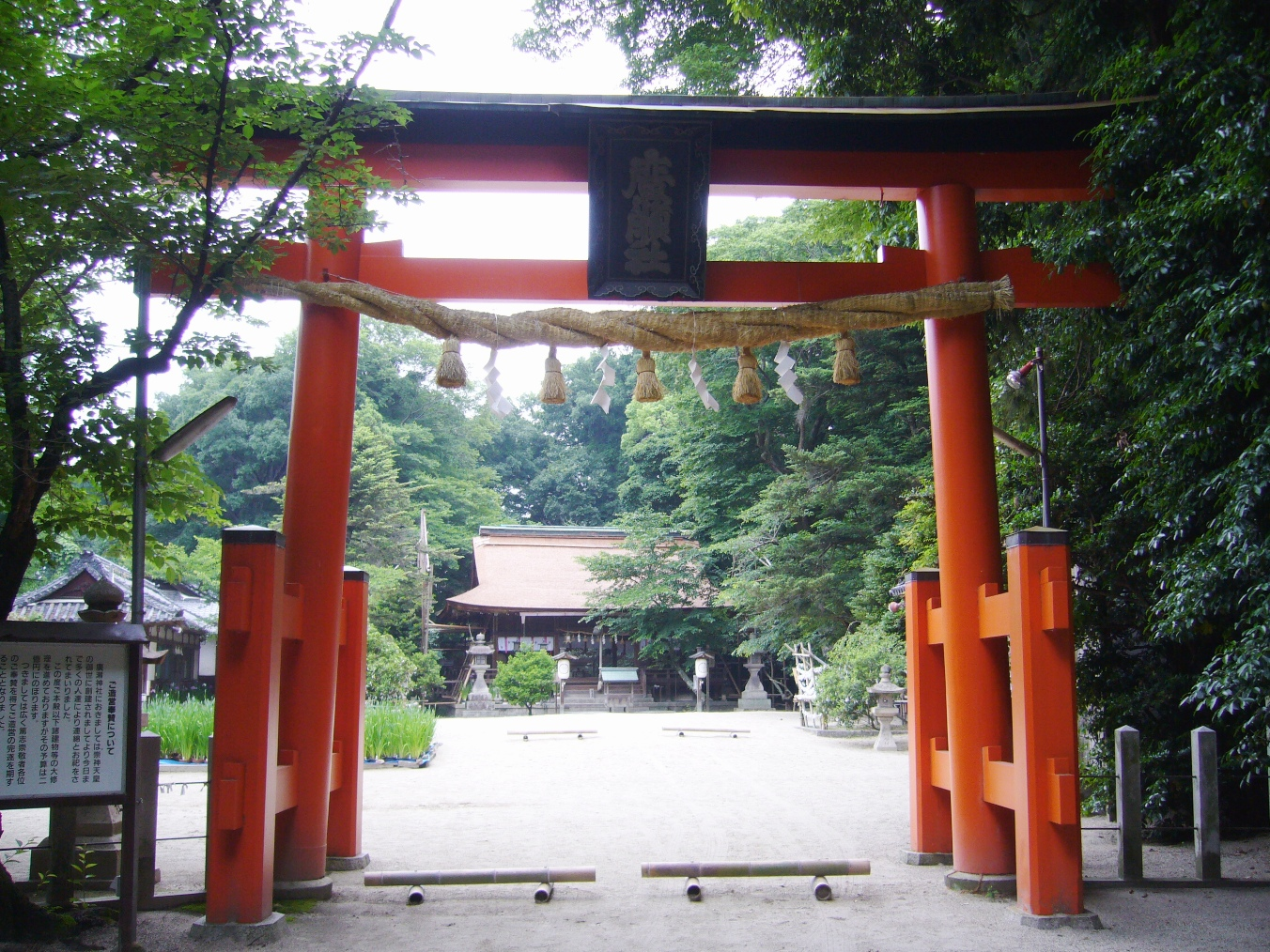
The second torii at Hirose Shrine.

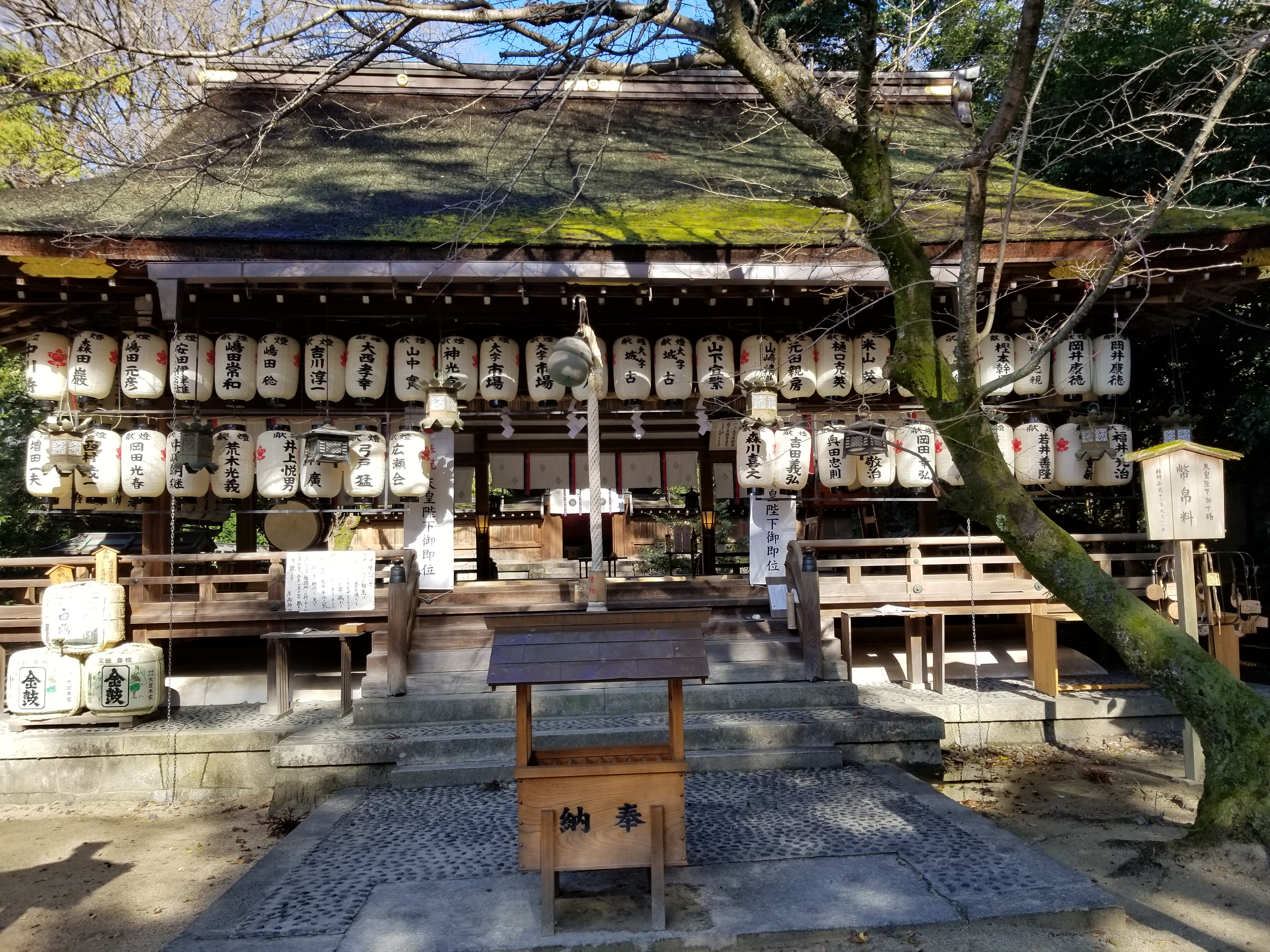
The haiden at Hirose Shrine.

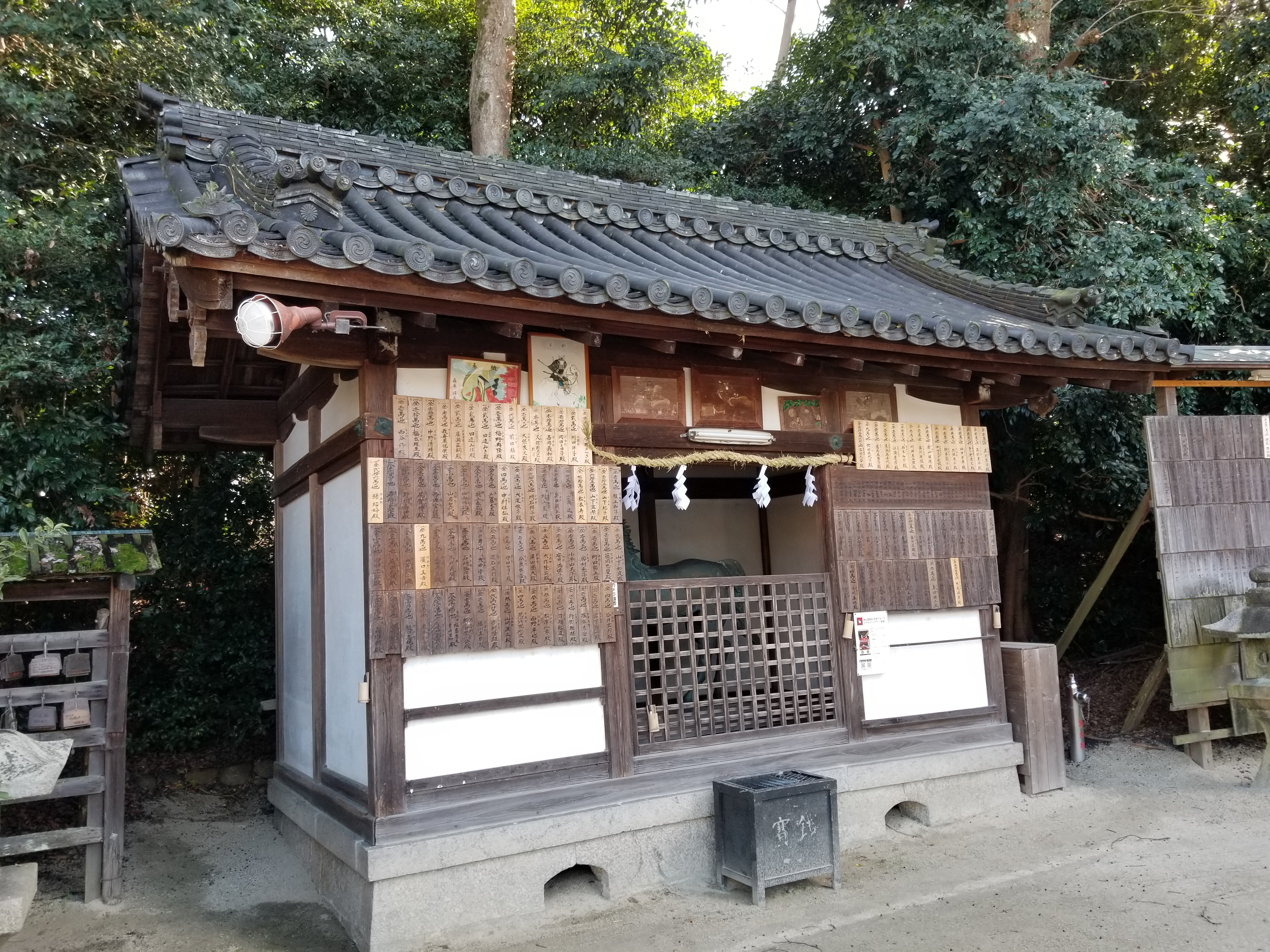
Shinme-sha (sacred horse house) at Hirose Shrine.

Hirose Shrine (廣瀬大社, Hirose-taisha), also referred to as Hirose-jinja, is a Shinto shrine located in Kawai, Nara prefecture, Japan.

The shrine became the object of Imperial patronage during the early Heian period. In 965, Emperor Murakami ordered that Imperial messengers were sent to report important events to the guardian kami of Japan. These heihaku were initially presented to 16 shrines including the Hirose Shrine.

From 1871 through 1946, Hirose Shrine was officially designated one of the kanpei-taisha (官幣大社), meaning that it stood in the first rank of government supported shrines.

== See also ==
- List of Shinto shrines
- Twenty-Two Shrines
- Modern system of ranked Shinto Shrines
