= Nagata Shrine =

Shinto shrine in Hyōgo Prefecture, Japan

Nagata Shrine 長田神社
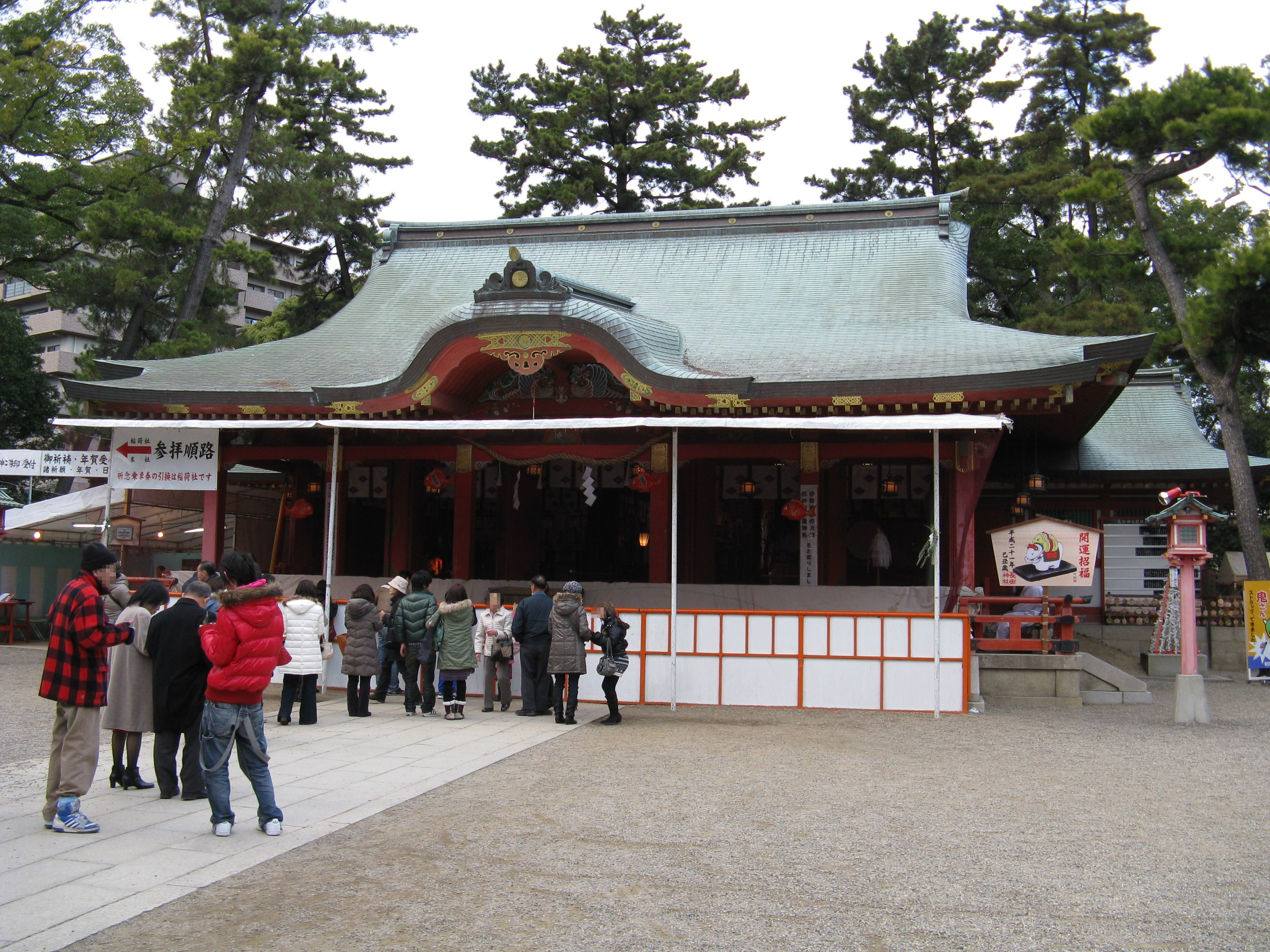
- Nagata jinja

- Location within Japan

Religion
- Affiliation: Shinto
- Deity: Kotoshironushi

Location
- Location: Kobe, Nagata-ku Nagata-cho 3-1-1
- Interactive map of Nagata Shrine 長田神社
- Coordinates: 34°40′17″N 135°08′49″E

Architecture
- Founder: Empress Jingū
- Established: 201

Website
- nagatajinja.jp/html/

Nagata Shrine (長田神社, Nagata jinja) is a Shinto shrine in Nagata-ku, Kobe, Japan. At Nagata, Kotoshironushi-no-Okami is enshrined.

The shrine is associated with Amaterasu, who is said to have told Empress Jingū that a shrine was wanted at Nagata.

== History ==
According to the Nihon Shoki, Nagata was founded by Empress Jingū at the beginning of the 3rd century along with Hirota Shrine. In 2001, the shrine celebrated its 1,800 years of history.

From 1871 through 1946, the Nagata was officially designated one of the kanpei-chūsha (官幣中社), meaning that it stood in the second tier of government supported shrines which were especially venerated by the imperial family.

== Festivals and events ==
An autumn matsuri in October is a special day (en'nichi) for the kami Kotoshironushi.

A setsubun observance in February is the Tsuina-shiki Shinji, which engages hopes for safety in the home and averting misfortune. This Shinto purification ritual is designated as an intangible cultural heritage event. The elaborate ceremony is a pantomime representation of driving out demons or bad spirits.

== See also ==
- List of Shinto shrines
- Twenty-Two Shrines
- Modern system of ranked Shinto Shrines
- Nagata Maru
