= Theory of Lie groups =

Book series by Claude Chevalley

In mathematics, Theory of Lie groups is a series of books on Lie groups by Claude Chevalley (1946, 1951, 1955). The first in the series was one of the earliest books on Lie groups to treat them from the global point of view, and for many years was the standard text on Lie groups. The second and third volumes, on algebraic groups and Lie algebras, were written in French, and later reprinted bound together as one volume. Apparently further volumes were planned but not published, though his lectures (Chevalley 2005) on the classification of semisimple algebraic groups could be considered as a continuation of the series.
