= Nagayoshi Iwahori =

Japanese mathematician

Nagayoshi Iwahori (岩堀 長慶, Iwahori Nagayoshi; 1926 to 29 May 2011) was a Japanese mathematician who worked on algebraic groups over local fields who introduced Iwahori–Hecke algebras and Iwahori subgroups.

== Publications ==
- Iwahori, N.; Matsumoto, H. (1965), "On some Bruhat decomposition and the structure of the Hecke rings of p-adic Chevalley groups", Publications Mathématiques de l'IHÉS, 25 (25): 5–48, doi:10.1007/BF02684396, ISSN 1618-1913, MR 0185016, S2CID 4591855

== See also ==
- Chevalley–Iwahori–Nagata theorem
