= Nagata–Biran conjecture =

In mathematics, the Nagata–Biran conjecture, named after Masayoshi Nagata and Paul Biran, is a generalisation of Nagata's conjecture on curves to arbitrary polarised surfaces.

The conjecture can be stated as follows: let $X$ be a smooth algebraic surface and $L$ be an ample line bundle on $X$ of degree $d$. Then for sufficiently large $r$, the Seshadri constant satisfies

$$\varepsilon(p_1,\ldots,p_r;X,L) = {d \over \sqrt{r}}.$$
