= Hirano Shrine =

Shinto shrine in Kyoto Prefecture, Japan

Coordinates: 35°01′57″N 135°43′55″E

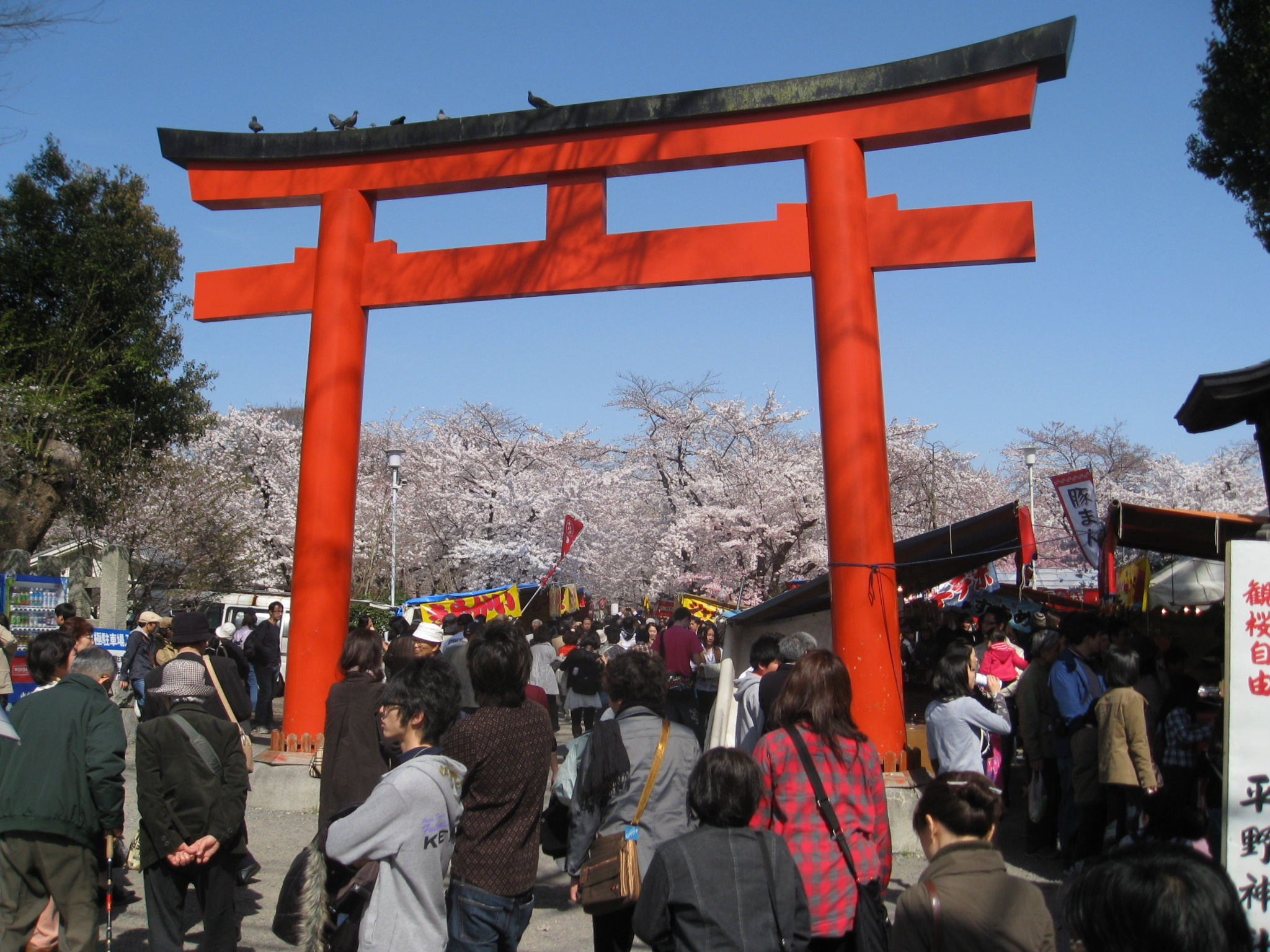
- Hirano shrine torii gate

Religion
- Affiliation: Shinto
- Deity: Imaki-No-Sume-Ookami (今木皇大神, いまきのすめおおかみ) Kudo-No-Ookami (久度大神, くどのおおかみ); Furuaki-No-Ookami (古開大神, ふるあきのおおかみ) Hime-No-Ookami (比売大神, ひめのおおかみ)
- Year consecrated: 794

Location
- Interactive map of Hirano Shrine

Architecture
- Style: Kasuga-zukuri

Hirano Shrine (平野神社, Hirano-jinja) is a Shinto shrine located in Kyoto. It is an ancient shrine listed in the Engishiki Jinmyocho as a Myojin Taisha and one of the Twenty-Two Shrines (specifically the Upper Seven Shrines). Formerly ranked as a Kanpei Taisha under the Modern system of ranked Shinto shrines, it is now a Beppyo shrine of the Association of Shinto Shrines. Its shrine crest is the "double cherry blossom" (八重桜, Yaezakura).

The current main shrine consists of four halls in two buildings, constructed in the unique style called Hirano-zukuri (平野造), and is designated as an Important Cultural Property. Other structures, including the worship hall, inner gate, south gate, and the Tsunashige Shrine, are designated or registered Cultural Property by Kyoto Prefecture. The shrine grounds are famous for cherry blossoms, particularly the illuminated night blossoms.

== Deity ==
Hirano Shrine enshrines four deities, each housed in a separate hall from north to south.

- Imaki-No-Sume-Ookami (今木皇大神, いまきのすめおおかみ): the main deity
- Kudo-No-Ookami (久度大神, くどのおおかみ)
- Furuaki-No-Ookami (古開大神, ふるあきのおおかみ)
- Hime-No-Ookami (比売大神, ひめのおおかみ)

== History ==
The shrine was established in the year 794 by Emperor Kammu when the capital was transferred to Heian-kyō from Nagaoka-kyō. From the earliest years, the shrine has been often visited by members of the Imperial family. In earlier centuries, the shrine also has connected a special relationship with both the Genji and the Heiji. It was the saved place from nature powered cases. And spirit Genji and Heiji sleep in the era. There was the capital of Tenno near by.

The shrine became the object of Imperial patronage during the early Heian period. In 965, Emperor Murakami ordered that Imperial messengers were sent to report important events to the guardian kami of Japan. These heihaku were initially presented to 16 shrines including the Hirano Shrine.

The shrine has been the site of a cherry blossom festival since 985. The long history of festivals at the Shrine began during the reign of Emperor Kazan, and it has become the oldest regularly held festival in Kyoto. Each year, the festival begins in the morning with a ceremony at the mausoleum of former Emperor Kazan. In the afternoon, a procession travels from the shrine into the neighbor area and back.

On 26 August 2018, the shrine suffered extensive damage from Typhoon Jebi, which it has struggled to recover from. The haiden was destroyed, as well as a few trees around the shrine.

From 1871 through 1946, the Hirano Shrine was officially designated one of the Kanpei-taisha (官幣大社), meaning that it stood in the first rank of government supported shrines.

== See also ==
- List of Shinto shrines
- Twenty-Two Shrines
- Modern system of ranked Shinto Shrines
