= Hirota Shrine =

Shinto shrine in Japan

Hirota Shrine 廣田神社
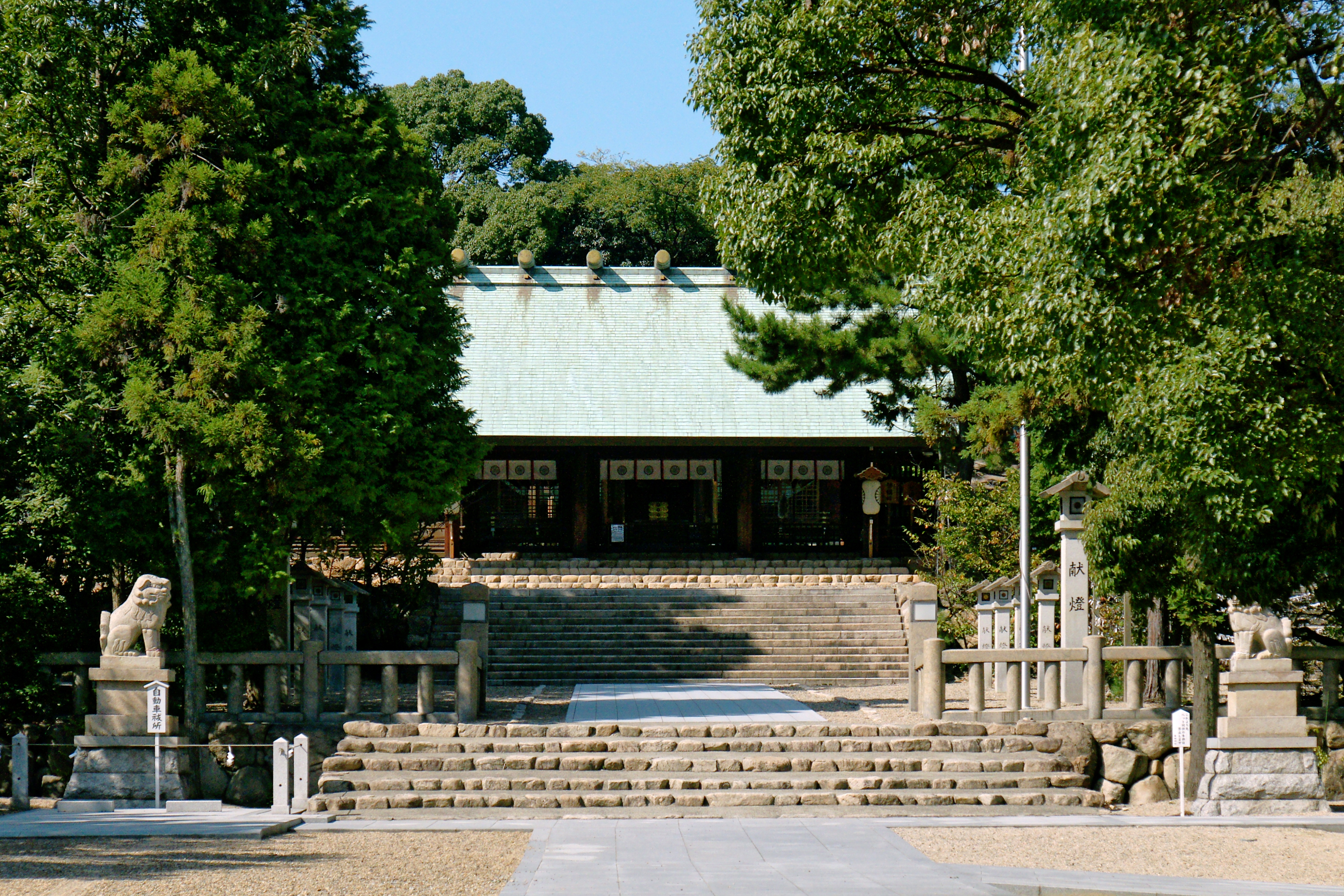
- Main hall

- Location within Japan

Religion
- Affiliation: Shinto
- Deity: Amaterasu
- Type: Grand Shrine, one of the Nijūnisha

Location
- Location: 7-7 Taisha-chō, Nishinomiya, Hyōgo prefecture
- Interactive map of Hirota Shrine 廣田神社
- Coordinates: 34°45′10.7″N 135°20′23.9″E

Architecture
- Style: Shinmei-zukuri
- Founder: Empress Jingū
- Established: 3rd century

Website
- www.hirotahonsya.or.jp/english.html

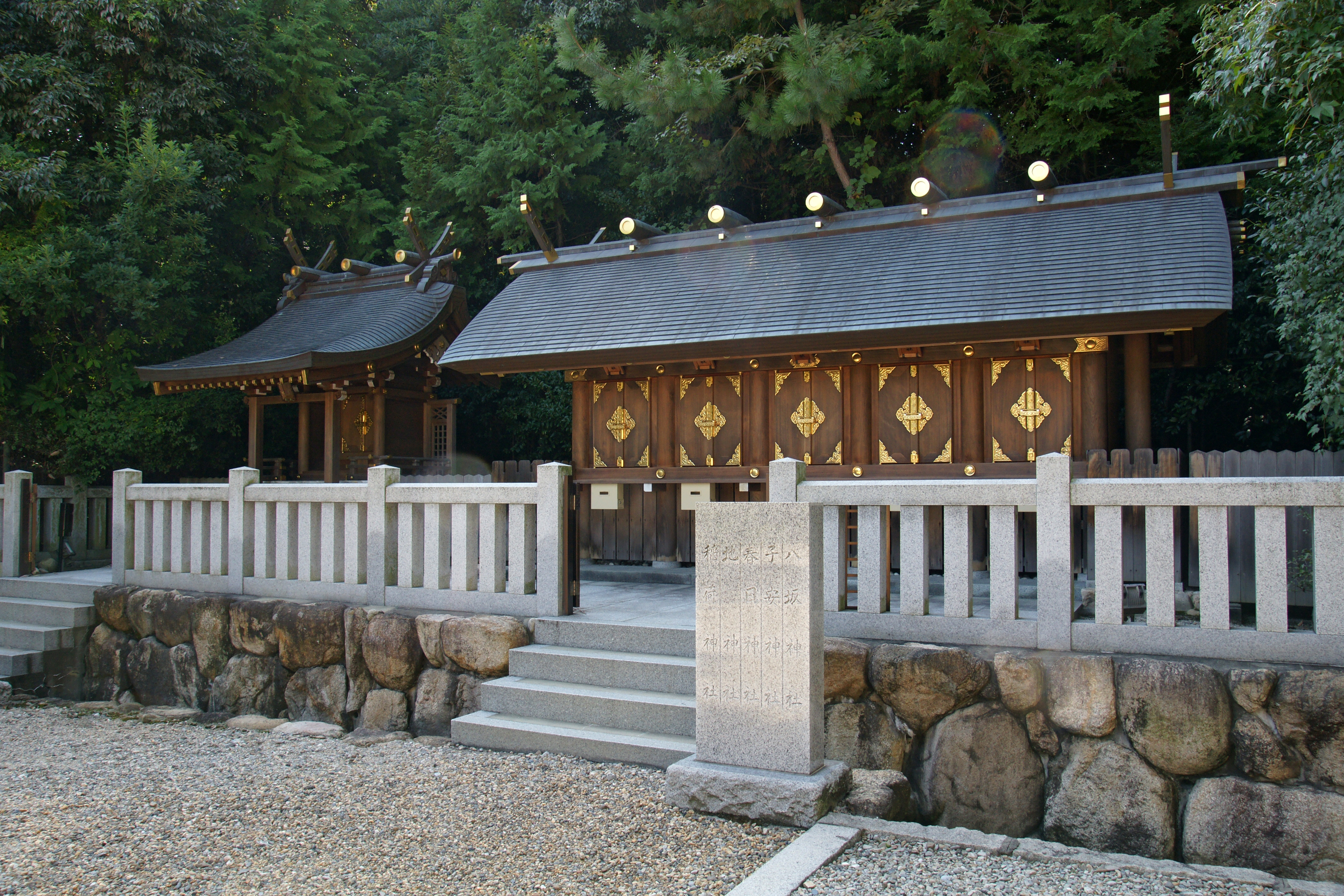
Keidai-sha

Hirota Shrine (廣田神社, Hirota-jinja) is a Shinto shrine in Nishinomiya City, Hyōgo Prefecture, Japan. The town's name, "Nishinomiya", means "shrine of the west", and the town is named for Hirota Shrine.

== Location ==
Hirota Shrine is near the bus stop for Hankyu Bus Co., Ltd. and Hanshin Bus Co., Ltd. "Hirota-Jinja-mae".

- from Nishinomiya-kitaguchi Station (Hankyu Kobe Line)

Hankyu Bus Route 12 (for Kotoen)

- from JR West Nishinomiya Station (JR Kobe Line)

Hankyu Bus Route 11 (for Kotoen)

- from Hanshin Nishinomiya Station (Main Line)

Hanshin Bus Yamate Loop (counterclockwise, via Nishinomiya-Shiyakusho-mae)

== History ==
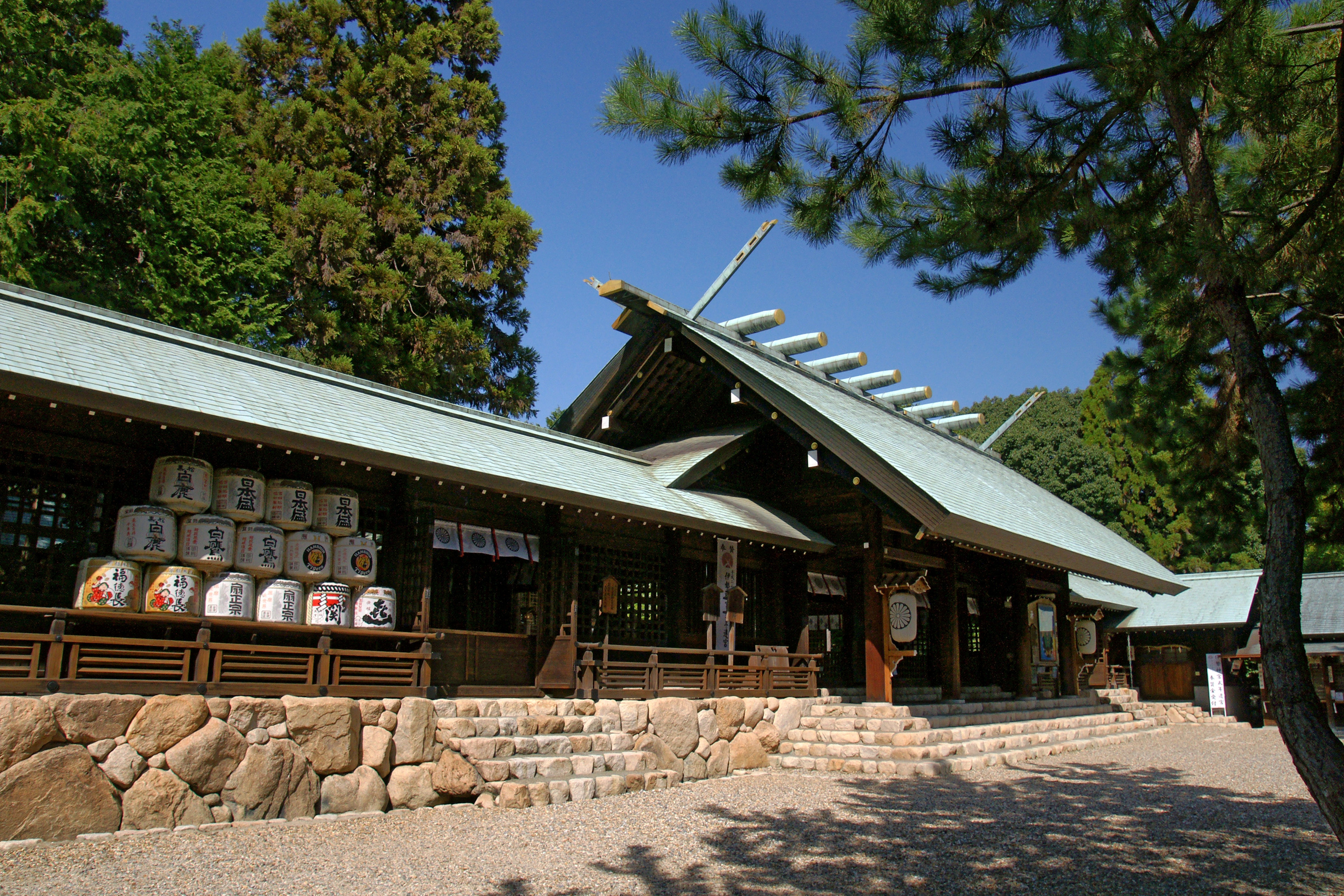
Haiden

Hirota Shrine is one of three shrines which, according to Nihon Shoki, a historical epic chronicle, were established by the Empress Jingū in the 3rd century. According to legend, Amaterasu, Goddess of the Sun, and arguably the most important kami in Shinto, spoke to the Empress and declared that she and the other gods of Japan must be enshrined in Hirota, Nagata, Ikuta, and Sumiyoshi. The Empress Consort did as commanded, and then achieved her political ambitions.

The shrine became the object of Imperial patronage during the early Heian period. In 965, Emperor Murakami ordered that Imperial messengers were sent to report important events to the guardian kami of Japan. These heihaku were initially presented to 16 shrines; and in 991, Emperor Ichijō added three more shrines to Murakami's list — including Hirota.

In the 11th century, under Emperor Shirakawa, Hirota Shrine was designated as "one of the twenty-two honorable shrines in the nation" and given the title "Hirota Grand Shrine". Today it is the only grand shrine in Hyōgo. Others may use the term "taisha" (grand shrine), but they are without the Imperial distinction that sets Hirota Shrine apart.

From 1871 through 1946, Hirota Shrine was officially designated one of the Kanpei-taisha (官幣大社), meaning that it stood in the first rank of government supported shrines.

The shrine is famous for its kobanomitsuba tsutsuji, azaleas with three small leaves.

== Events ==
Hirota Shinto shrine hosts these events:

- January 1: Sai-tan-sai
- January 3: Gen-shi-sai
- January 1–3: Kai-un-sai
- January 18–19: Yaku-yoke-sai
- February 11: Ki-gen-sai
- February 17: Ki-nen-sai (Taisai)
- March 16: Rei-sai (Taisai)
- April 16: Haru matsuri (Spring festival)
- Late May: Hirota Ohtaue (Rice planting festival)
- June 30: Nagoshi no oohara eshiki
- July 16: Natsu matsuri (Summer festival)
- Late September: Neki-ho-sai
- October 16: Aki matsuri (Autumn festival)
- November 3: Mei-ji-sai
- November 23: Nii-name-sai (Taisai)
- December 23: Ten-chou-sai
- First day of each month: Tsuki hajime sai, Hatsu hokou-sai
- Sixteenth day of each month: Tsuki-name-sai
- Every morning: Asa-mi-ke-sai, Yuu-mi-ke-sai

== See also ==
- List of Shinto shrines
- Twenty-Two Shrines
- Modern system of ranked Shinto Shrines
