= Twenty-Two Shrines =

Ranking system for Shinto shrines

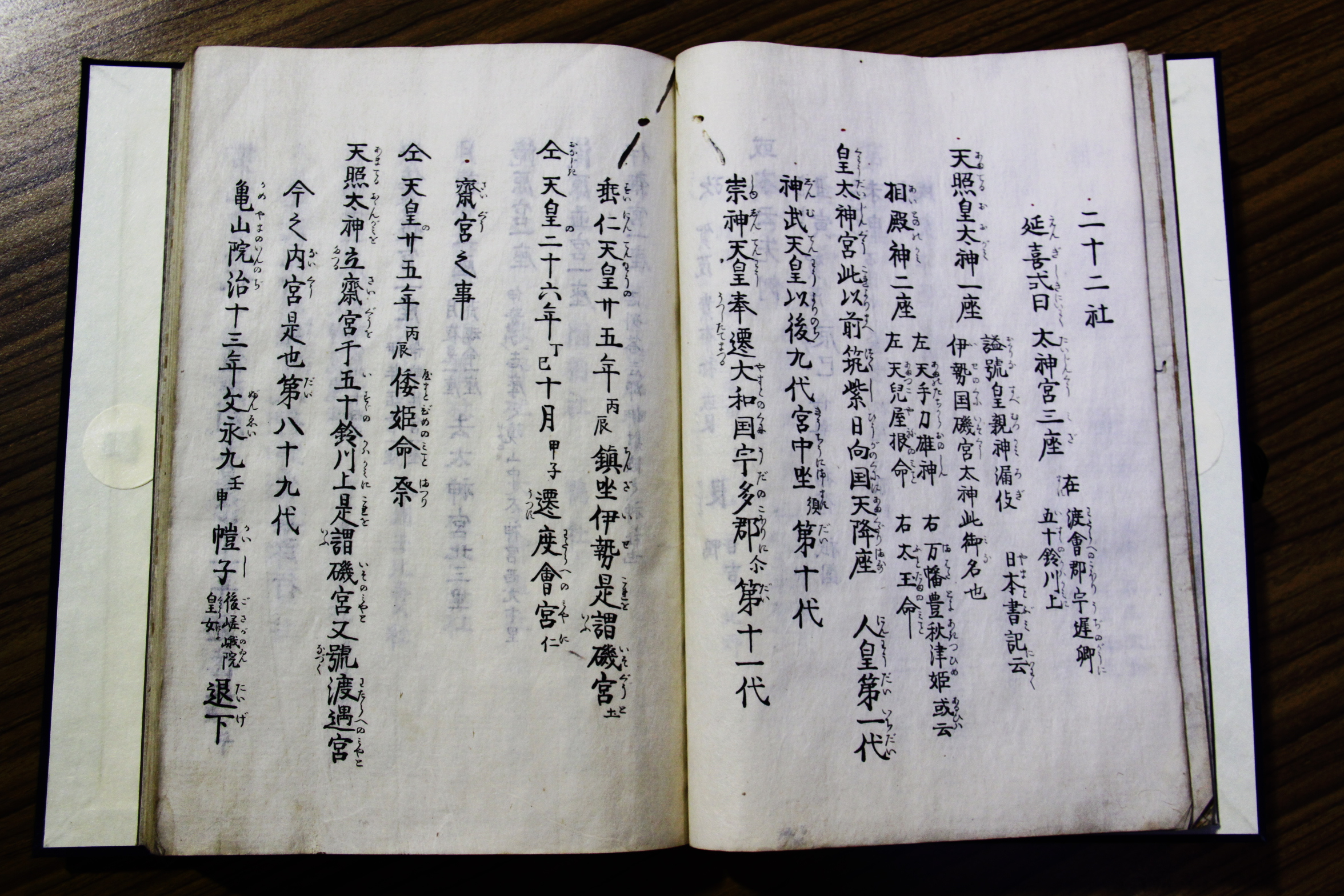
Manuscript of Nijūnisha-chūshiki

The Twenty-Two Shrines (二十二社, Nijūni-sha) of Japan is one ranking system for Shinto shrines. The system was established during the Heian period and formed part of the government's systematization of Shinto during the emergence of a general anti-Chinese sentiment and the suppression of the Taoist religion. It involved the establishment of the shrines as important centers of public life in Japan. It played a role in official imperial ceremonies such as the Practice of Chinkon. An extensive body of literature also emerged containing information about each shrine, including the shrine's origin, priestly dress, divine treatises, the system of shrine removal, subordinate shrines, and annual cycle of rituals, among others.

By the year 806, 4,870 households were assigned to Shinto shrines while the government provided a national endowment for their upkeep. These shrines also received special offerings from the Imperial Court. As time progressed, this offering to the shrines was amended so that Imperial envoys were only sent to the powerful shrines in Kyoto, which was the capital of Japan at the time. This amendment initially identified fourteen shrines but it was increased to twenty-two in 1081. There are historians who explained that the majority on the list involved those with central lineages supporting the imperial house, sites of cults that gained popular significance, and shrines in locations with the presence of Buddhist institutions.

== Establishment ==
Under the Ritsuryō law system, the shrines that the Imperial Court would present offerings to for rites such as the ki'nensai (祈年祭), a service to pray for a good harvest, were mostly decided by the Engishiki Jinmyōchō (延喜式神名帳, Engishiki Shrine Name Book), but once the Ritsuryō system began to deteriorate, the offerings were only given to a select few shrines.

In 965, Emperor Murakami ordered that Imperial messengers were sent to report important events to the guardian kami of Japan. These heihaku were presented to 16 shrines: 1. Ise; 2. Iwashimizu; 3. Kamo; 4. Matsunoo; 5. Hirano; 6. Inari; 7. Kasuga; 8. Oharano; 9. Miwa; 10: Isonokami; 11. Ōyamato; 12. Hirose; 13. Tatsuta; 14. Sumiyoshi; 15. Nibu and 16. Kibune.

In 991, Emperor Ichijō added three more shrines to Murakami's list—17. Yoshida; 18. Hirota; and 19. Kitano; and two more were added three years later in 994;—20. Umenomiya; and 21. Gion.

In 1039, Emperor Go-Suzaku ordered that one more shrine be added to this list, 22. Hie, and this unique number of Imperial-designated shrines has not been altered since that time.

Near the end of the Heian period, there was a movement to add Itsukushima Shrine to the list, but it did not happen. However, until the end of the Muromachi period, the Imperial Court made offerings to it, and in the Edo period, offerings were again made after disasters occurred.

== List of shrines ==
When the Nijūni-sha are considered as a grouped set, they are conventionally presented in order of rank, not in terms of the chronological sequence in which they were designated. The three rank ranked groupings originally derived from a complex array of Heian geopolitical relationships.

=== Upper Seven Shrines ===
| Shrine Name | | Current name | Location |
|---|---|---|---|
| Jingū (神宮) | | Jingū (also Ise Jingū 伊勢神宮) | Ise, Mie |
| Iwashimizu Hachimangū-ji (石清水八幡宮寺) | | Iwashimizu Hachiman-gū (石清水八幡宮) | Yawata, Kyoto Prefecture |
| Kamigamo Jinja (賀茂神社) | Kamo-wakeikazuchi Jinja (賀茂別雷神社) | Kamo-wakeikazuchi Jinja (Kamigamo Jinja) (上賀茂神社) | Kita-ku, Kyoto |
| Kamigamo Jinja (賀茂神社) | Kamo-mioya Jinja (賀茂御祖神社) | Kamo-mioya Jinja (Shimogamo Jinja) (下鴨神社) | Sakyō-ku, Kyoto |
| Matsunoo Jinja (松尾神社) | | Matsunoo Taisha (松尾大社) | Ukyō-ku, Kyoto |
| Hirano Jinja (平野神社) | | Hirano Jinja | Kita-ku, Kyoto |
| Inari Jinja (稲荷神社) | | Fushimi Inari Taisha (伏見稲荷大社) | Fushimi-ku, Kyoto |
| Kasuga Jinja (春日神社) | | Kasuga-taisha | Nara City, Nara Prefecture |

=== Middle Seven Shrines ===
| Shrine Name | Current name | Location |
|---|---|---|
| Ōharano Jinja (大原野神社) | Ōharano Jinja | Nishikyō-ku, Kyoto |
| Ōmiwa Jinja (大神神社) | Ōmiwa Jinja | Sakurai, Nara |
| Isonokami Jinja (石上神社) | Isonokami Jingū | Tenri, Nara |
| Ōyamato Jinja (大和神社) | Ōyamato Jinja | Tenri, Nara |
| Hirose Jinja (廣瀬神社) | Hirose Taisha | Kawai, Nara |
| Tatsuta Jinja (龍田神社) | Tatsuta Taisha | Sangō, Nara |
| Sumiyoshi Jinja (住吉神社) | Sumiyoshi Taisha | Sumiyoshi-ku, Osaka |

=== Lower Eight Shrines ===
| Shrine Name | Current name | Location |
|---|---|---|
| Hie Jinja (日吉神社) | Hiyoshi Taisha | Otsu, Shiga |
| Umenomiya Jinja (梅宮神社) | Umenomiya Taisha | Ukyō-ku, Kyoto |
| Yoshida Jinja (吉田神社) | Yoshida Jinja | Sakyō-ku, Kyoto |
| Hirota Jinja (廣田神社) | Hirota Jinja | Nishinomiya, Hyōgo |
| Gion-sha (祇園社) | Yasaka Jinja (八坂神社) | Higashiyama-ku, Kyoto |
| Kitano Jinja (北野神社) | Kitano Tenman-gū (北野天満宮) | Kamigyō-ku, Kyoto |
| Niukawakami Jinja (丹生川上神社) | *Niukawakami Jinja Shimosha (lower shrine); Niukawakami Jinja Nakasha (middle shrine); *Niukawakami Jinja Kamisha (upper shrine) | Shimoichi, Nara; Higashiyoshino, Nara; Kawakami, Nara |
| Kibune Jinja (貴船神社) | Kibune Jinja (also Kifune Jinja) | Sakyō-ku, Kyoto |

- Note: At the time when the Nijunisha were chosen, the current Niukawakami Nakasha was the only Niukawakami Shrine. It became the middle shrine (nakasha) only after the shrine in Shimoichi and Kawakami were united with it.

== See also ==
- Ichinomiya
- List of Jingū
- List of Shinto shrines
