= Nagata Maru =

Japanese cargo ship

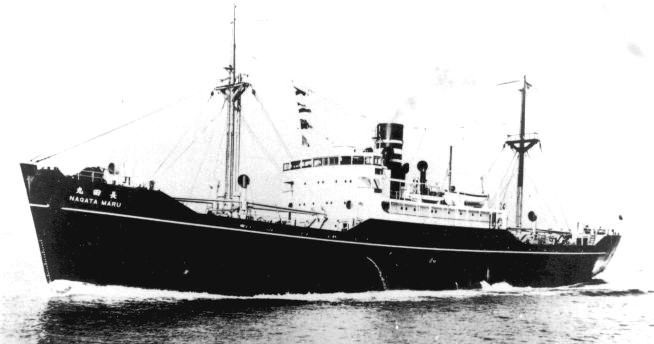
- Nagata Maru before World War II

History

Japan
- Name: Nagata Maru
- Operator: Nippon Yusen Kaisha, Tokyo
- Laid down: 30 July 1936
- Launched: 27 November 1936
- Completed: 15 February 1937
- In service: 1937
- Fate: Bombed and sunk, 22 April 1944

General characteristics
- Class & type: Ikuta Maru Class
- Tonnage: 2,969 GRT
- Notes: Steel construction

The Nagata Maru (長田丸, Nagata maru) was a Japanese cargo ship owned by Nippon Yusen Kaisha, Tokyo. The ship entered service in 1937.

The name Nagata Maru derives from Nagata jinja, a Shinto shrine in Nagata Ward, Kobe, Japan.

She was the third ship in the Ikuta Maru-class, consisting of Ikuta Maru, Taiko Maru, Nagata Maru, Senyo Maru, Manyo Maru, Okuyo Maru, Tsuneshima Maru and Yamadori Maru.

== History ==
Nagata Maru was the name of several Japanese vessels. In 1900, Fujinagata Shipyards completed its first all-metal construction merchant vessel; the No.2 Nagata Maru.

=== List of ships named Nagata Maru ===
- Nagata Maru No. 1
- Nagata Maru No. 2
- Nagata Maru No. 3
- Nagata Maru No. 4
- Nagata Maru No. 5
- Nagata Maru No. 6
- Nagata Maru No. 7
- Nagata Maru No. 8
- Nagata Maru No. 9
- Nagata Maru No. 10
- Nagata Maru No. 11
- Nagata Maru No. 12
- Nagata Maru No. 13
- Nagata Maru (1937)

=== Pacific War ===
In 1939, Nagata Maru was requisitioned by the Imperial Japanese Navy for use as an troopship.

During the Japanese occupation of the Gilbert Islands, she installed within 2 days the seaplane base in Makin lagoon.

In transporting Allied prisoners, it was amongst those vessels which earned the epithet "hell ships."

On 22 April 1944, Nagata Maru was part of a Singapore-to-Saigon convoy anchored off Cape St. Jacques in French Indochina. The ship was bombed and sunk.
