= Nagata's compactification theorem =

In algebraic geometry, Nagata's compactification theorem, introduced by Nagata (1962, 1963), implies that every abstract variety can be embedded in a complete variety, and more generally shows that a separated and finite type morphism to a Noetherian scheme S can be factored into an open immersion followed by a proper morphism.

Nagata's original proof used the older terminology of Zariski–Riemann spaces and valuation theory, which sometimes made it hard to follow. Deligne showed, in unpublished notes expounded by Conrad, that Nagata's proof can be translated into scheme theory and that the condition that S is Noetherian can be replaced by the much weaker condition that S is quasi-compact and quasi-separated. Lütkebohmert (1993) gave another scheme-theoretic proof of Nagata's theorem.

An important application of Nagata's theorem is in defining the analogue in algebraic geometry of cohomology with compact support, or more generally higher direct image functors with proper support. The idea is that given a compactifiable morphism $f: X \to S,$ one defines $R f_!$ by choosing a factorization $f = p \circ j$ by an open immersion j and proper morphism p, and then setting

$$Rf_! = Rp_* \circ j_{\sharp}$$,

where $j_{\sharp}$ is the extension by zero functor. One then shows the independence of the definition from the choice of compactification.

In the context of étale sheaves, this idea was carried out by Deligne in SGA 4, Exposé XVII. In the context of coherent sheaves, the statements are more delicate since for an open immersion j, the inverse image functor $j^*$ does not usually admit a left adjoint. Nonetheless, $j_{\sharp}$ exists as a pro-left adjoint, and Deligne was able to define the functor $R f_!$ as valued in the pro-derived category of coherent sheaves.
