= 3-fold =

In algebraic geometry, a 3-fold or threefold is an algebraic variety of dimension 3.

The Mori program showed that 3-folds have minimal models.

== See also ==
- Algebraic curve
- Algebraic surface
- Cubic threefold
- Quartic threefold
- Quintic threefold
