= Nagata's conjecture on curves =

Mathematical proposition

In mathematics, the Nagata conjecture on curves, named after Masayoshi Nagata, governs the minimal degree required for a plane algebraic curve to pass through a collection of very general points with prescribed multiplicities.

== History ==
Nagata arrived at the conjecture via work on the 14th problem of Hilbert, which asks whether the invariant ring of a linear group action on the polynomial ring k[x_{1}, ..., x_{n}] over some field k is finitely generated. Nagata published the conjecture in a 1959 paper in the American Journal of Mathematics, in which he presented a counterexample to Hilbert's 14th problem.

== Statement ==
Nagata Conjecture. Suppose p_{1}, ..., p_{r} are very general points in P^{2} and that m_{1}, ..., m_{r} are given positive integers. Then for r > 9 any curve C in P^{2} that passes through each of the points p_{i} with multiplicity m_{i} must satisfy

$$\deg C > \frac{1}{\sqrt{r}}\sum_{i=1}^r m_i.$$

The condition r > 9 is necessary: The cases r > 9 and r ≤ 9 are distinguished by whether or not the anti-canonical bundle on the blowup of P^{2} at a collection of r points is nef. In the case where r ≤ 9, the cone theorem essentially gives a complete description of the cone of curves of the blow-up of the plane.

== Current status ==
The only case when this is known to hold is when r is a perfect square, which was proved by Nagata. Despite much interest, the other cases remain open. A more modern formulation of this conjecture is often given in terms of Seshadri constants and has been generalised to other surfaces under the name of the Nagata–Biran conjecture.
