= Nagata's conjecture =

Mathematical theorem in algebra

- Field: Algebraic geometry
- Conjectured by: Masayoshi Nagata
- Conjectured in: 1972
- First proof by: Ualbai Umirbaev and Ivan Shestakov
- First proof in: 2004

In algebra, Nagata's conjecture states that Nagata's automorphism of the polynomial ring k[x,y,z] is wild. The conjecture was proposed by Nagata (1972) and proved by Ualbai U. Umirbaev and Ivan P. Shestakov (2004).

Nagata's automorphism is given by

$$\phi(x,y,z) = (x-2\Delta y-\Delta^2z, y+\Delta z, z),$$

where $\Delta = xz+y^2$.

For the inverse, let $(a,b,c)=\phi(x,y,z)$ Then $z=c$ and $\Delta= b^2+ac$. With this $y=b-\Delta c$ and $x=a+2\Delta y+\Delta^2 z$.
