= Nagata Tokuhon =

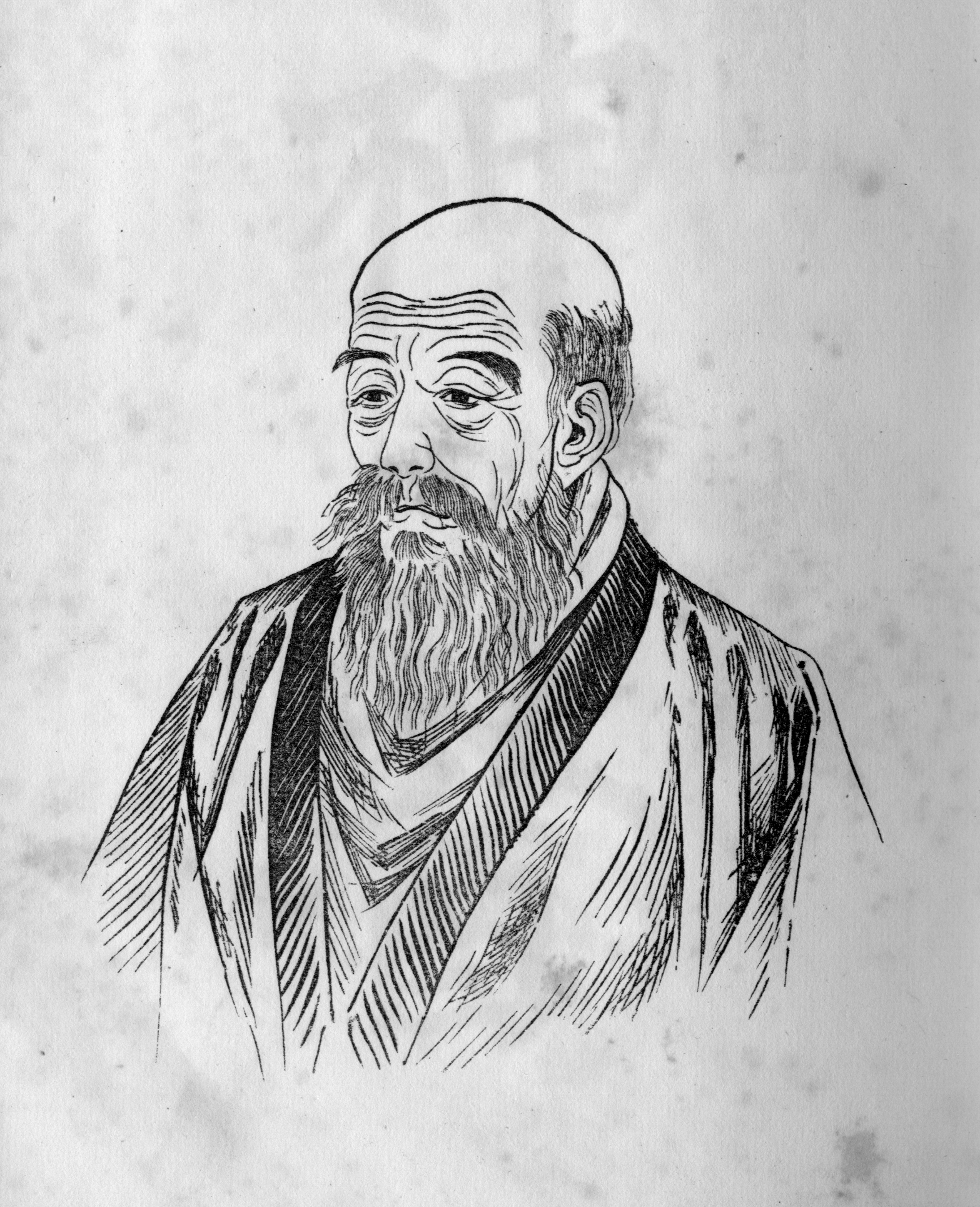
Tokuhon portrait

Nagata Tokuhon (永田徳本) (1512 - 1630) was a medieval Japanese physician. He was in the service of the Takeda clan of Kai Province, and later served the Tokugawa clan.

Nagata's medical philosophy emphasised "natural" healing processes during a period when medicine in Japan tended to follow the theories of Traditional Chinese Medicine. Unlike his contemporaries, Nagata believed in allowing patients to heal without interference. One example of his method is provided by the story of his treatment of a Japanese nobleman who was suffering from a fever: Nagata asked the man what he desired and on being told that his patient felt the need for watermelon, fresh air and cold water, provided these things. The patient recovered despite the treatment being at odds with the teachings of Chinese medicine. Consequently, although his training was in Chinese medicine, he is considered to be one of the main figures in the revival of Japanese medicine, mixing contemporary post-Sung techniques with ancient native practices.

Nagata lived to be 118 years old.
