= Kōsoku Nagata Station =

Railway station in Kobe, Japan

Coordinates: 34.6672584°N 135.151577°E

Kōsoku Nagata 高速長田
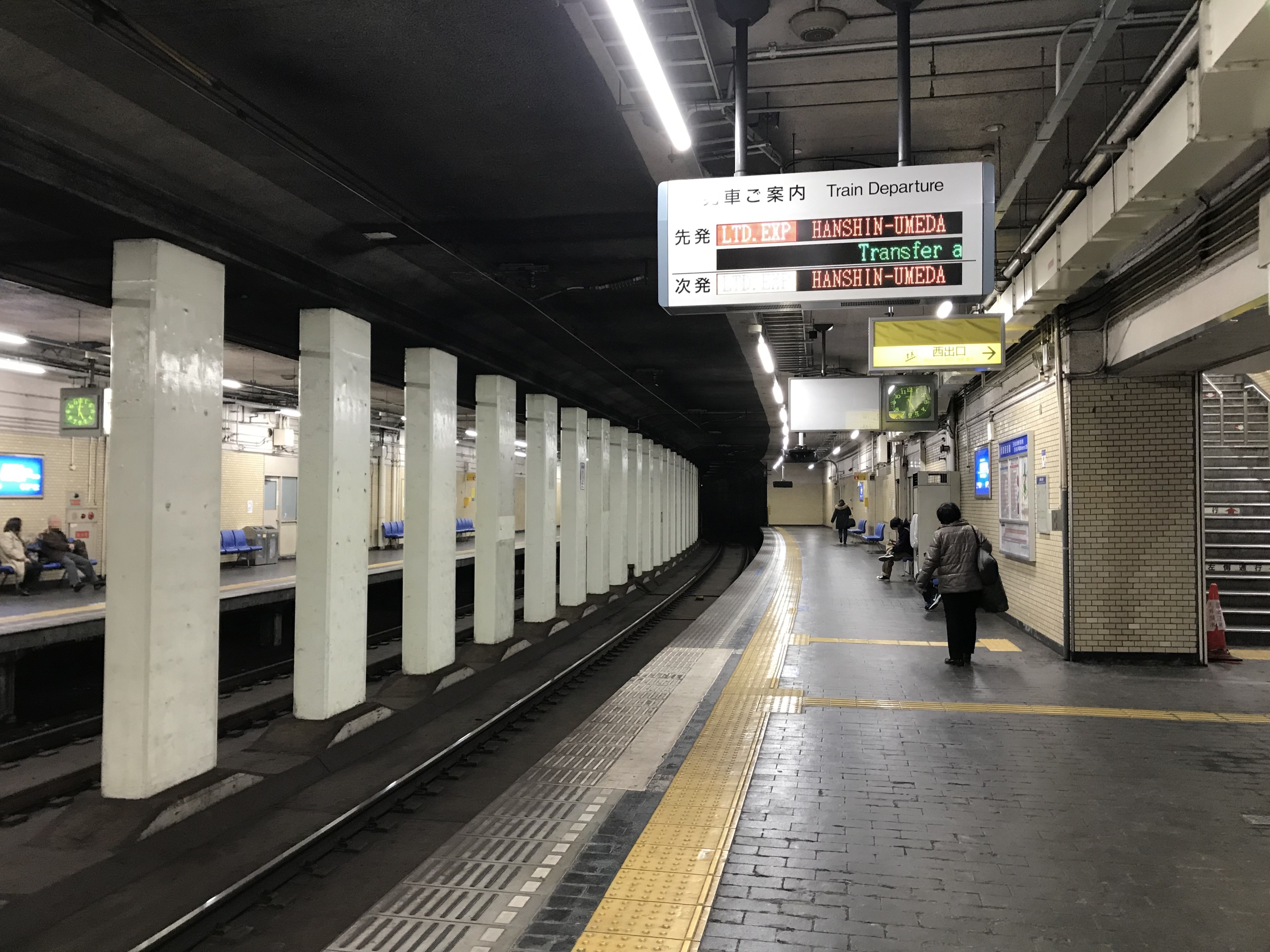
- Platform of Kobe Rapid Transit Kosoku-Nagata Station

General information
- Location: Nagata-ku, Kobe, Hyōgo Prefecture; Japan
- Operator: Hanshin Railway
- Line: Tozai Line
- Connections: Kobe Municipal Subway Seishin-Yamate Line - Nagata Station

Services
Hanshin Railway Kobe Kosoku Line (HS 38)
Daikai (HS 37)	Sanyo Local	Nishidai (HS 39, SY 01)
Daikai (HS 37)	Hans hin Local	Nishidai (HS 39, SY 01)
Daikai (HS 37)	Hanshin Limited Express	Nishidai (HS 39, SY 01)
Daikai (HS 37)	S Limited Express	Nishidai (HS 39, SY 01)
Daikai (HS 37)	Through Limited Express (yellow marking)	Nishidai (HS 39, SY 01)
Shinkaichi (HS 36)	Through Limited Express (red marking)	Itayado (Sanyo, SY 02)
Location

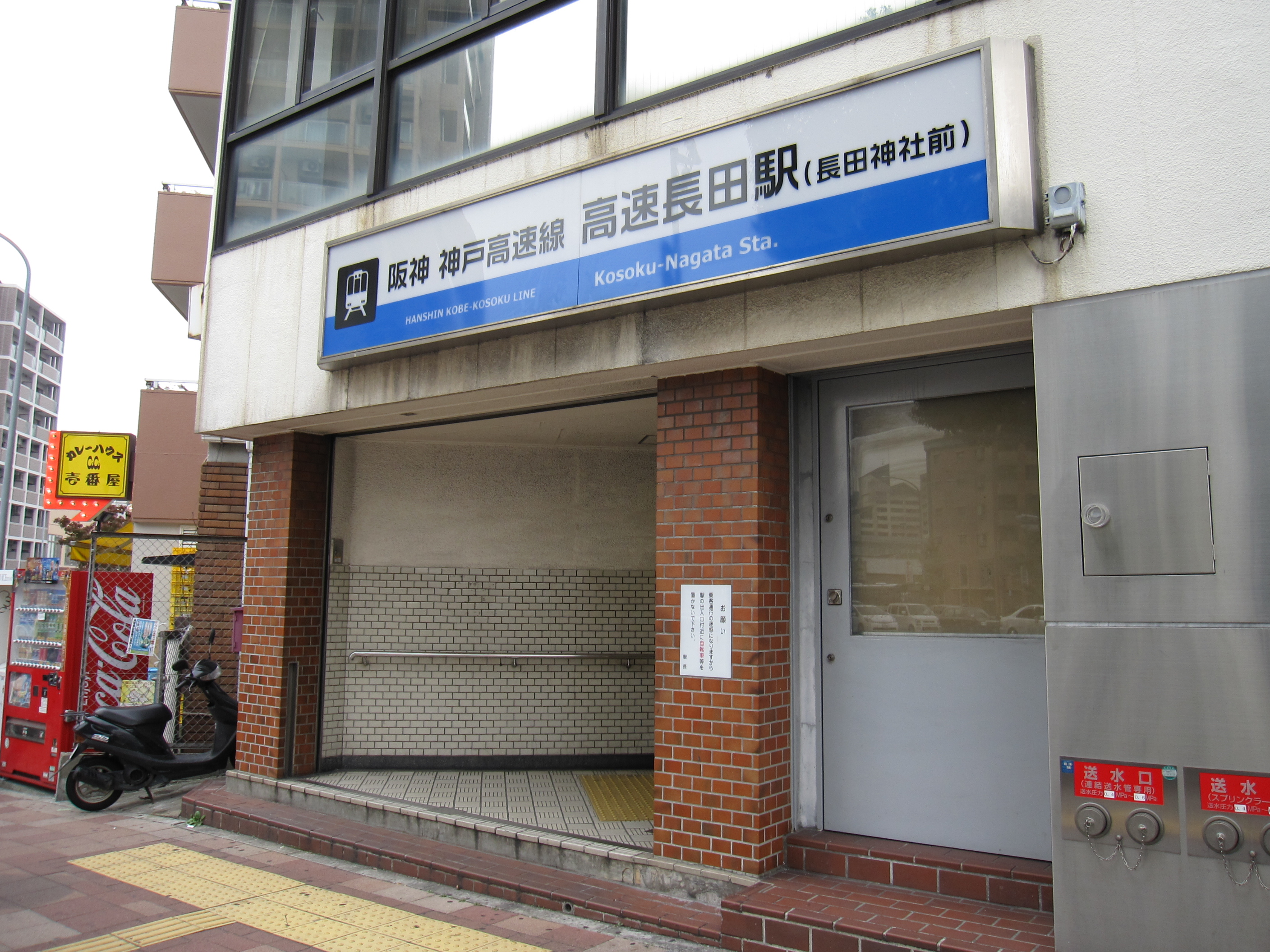
Kosoku-Nagata station south gate

Kōsoku Nagata Station (高速長田駅, Kōsoku Nagata-eki; station number: HS 38) is a train station on the Hanshin Railway Kobe Kosoku Line in Nagata-ku, Kobe, Hyōgo Prefecture, Japan.

== History ==
The station opened on 7 April 1968.

Damage to the station was caused by the Great Hanshin earthquake in 1995.

Station numbering was introduced on 1 April 2014.

== Connecting lines ==
- Kobe Municipal Subway Seishin-Yamate Line – Nagata (Nagatajinjamae) Station
