= Seshadri constant =

Constant in algebraic geometry

In algebraic geometry, a Seshadri constant is an invariant of an ample line bundle $L$ at a point on an algebraic variety. It was introduced by Jean-Pierre Demailly to measure a certain "rate of growth" of the tensor powers of $L$ in terms of the jets of the sections of the $L^k$. The object was the study of the Fujita conjecture. The constant's name stems from its connection to C. S. Seshadri's criterion for ampleness.

It is known that Nagata's conjecture on algebraic curves is equivalent to the assertion that for more than nine general points, the Seshadri constants of the projective plane are maximal. There is a general conjecture for algebraic surfaces, the Nagata–Biran conjecture.

== Definition ==
Let $X$ be a smooth projective variety, $L$ an ample line bundle on $X$, $x$ a point of $X$, and $\mathcal{C}_x$ the set of all irreducible curves passing through $x$. Define the Seshadri constant of $L$ at $x$ by

$$\varepsilon(L,x) = \inf_{C \in \mathcal{C}_x} \frac{L \cdot C}{\operatorname{mult}_x(C)}$$,

where $L \cdot C$ denotes the intersection number of $L$ and $C$ and $\operatorname{mult}_x(C)$ measures how many times the curve $C$ passes through $x$.

If $X$ is an abelian variety, then $\varepsilon(L,x)$ is independent of the point $x$ chosen, and we write simply $\varepsilon(L)$.
