= Masayoshi Nagata =

Japanese mathematician

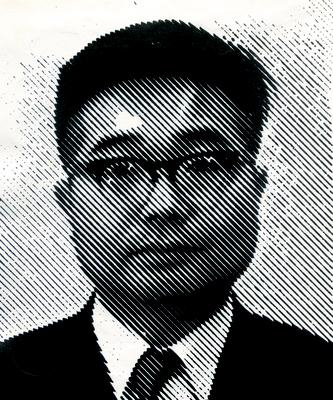
- Born: February 9, 1927; Ōbu, Aichi, Japan
- Died: August 27, 2008 (aged 81); Kyoto, Japan
- Education: Nagoya University
- Known for: Nagata ring Nagata's conjecture Nagata's conjecture on curves Nagata's compactification theorem Chevalley–Iwahori–Nagata theorem Zariski–Nagata purity Mori–Nagata theorem Analytically irreducible ring
- Scientific career
- Fields: Mathematics
- Workplaces: Kyoto University
- Thesis: Research on the 14th problem of Hilbert (1957)
- Doctoral advisor: Tadasi Nakayama
- Doctoral students: Shigefumi Mori

Masayoshi Nagata (Japanese: 永田 雅宜 Nagata Masayoshi; February 9, 1927 – August 27, 2008) was a Japanese mathematician, known for his work in the field of commutative algebra. He was celebrated for the construction of a number of intricate counterexamples for some seemingly plausible statements in commutative algebra and algebraic geometry, earning him the nickname "Mr. Counterexample".

== Work ==
Nagata's compactification theorem shows that algebraic varieties can be embedded in complete varieties. The Chevalley–Iwahori–Nagata theorem describes the quotient of a variety by a group.

In 1959, he introduced a counterexample to the general case of Hilbert's fourteenth problem on invariant theory. His 1962 book on local rings contains several other counterexamples he found, such as a commutative Noetherian ring that is not catenary, and a commutative Noetherian ring of infinite dimension.

Nagata's conjecture on curves concerns the minimum degree of a plane curve specified to have given multiplicities at given points; see also Seshadri constant. Nagata's conjecture on automorphisms concerns the existence of wild automorphisms of polynomial algebras in three variables. Recent work has solved this latter problem in the affirmative.

== Selected works ==
- Nagata, Masayoshi (1960), "On the fourteenth problem of Hilbert", Proc. Internat. Congress Math. 1958, Cambridge University Press, pp. 459–462, MR 0116056, archived from the original on 2011-07-17
- Nagata, Masayoshi (1965), Lectures on the fourteenth problem of Hilbert (PDF), Tata Institute of Fundamental Research Lectures on Mathematics, vol. 31, Bombay: Tata Institute of Fundamental Research, MR 0215828
- Nagata, Masayoshi (1962), Local rings, Interscience Tracts in Pure and Applied Mathematics, vol. 13, New York-London: Interscience Publishers a division of John Wiley & Sons, ISBN 0-88275-228-6, MR 0155856
