= Hisayoshi Nagata =

Japanese water polo player

Personal information
- Born: November 14, 1962 (age 62)

Sport
- Sport: Water polo

Hisayoshi Nagata (永田 久喜, Nagata Hisayoshi, born 14 November 1962) is a Japanese former water polo player who competed in the 1984 Summer Olympics.
