= Keta shrine =

Keta shrine can refer to:

- Keta Jinja
- Keta Wakamiya Shrine
- Keta Taisha
