= Rokusho (disambiguation) =

Rokushō is a traditional Japanese chemical compound.

Rokusho can also refer to:

- Rokushō-ji, a group of Japanese Buddhist temples
- Rokusho Shrine, Okazaki
- several Sōja shrines

== See also ==
- Ichinomiya
- Sōja shrine (disambiguation)
- Keta shrine (disambiguation)
