= Wakamiya =

Wakamiya may refer to:

== Places ==
- Wakamiya (shrine), a Shinto shrine usually dedicated to a child-god (mikogami) and affiliated with the shrine of their parent
- Wakamiya, Fukuoka, a town located in Kurate District, Fukuoka Prefecture, Japan that in 2006, along with the town of Miyata (also from Kurate District), was merged to create the city of Miyawaka
- Wakamiya Station, a railway station on the Tadami Line in the town of Aizubange, Fukushima Prefecture, Japan, operated by East Japan Railway Company (JR East).
- Keta Wakamiya Shrine, a Shinto shrine located in the city of Hida, Gifu Prefecture, Japan also commonly referred to as "Sugimoto-sama"
- Wakamiya Ōji, a 1.8 km street in Kamakura, a city in Kanagawa Prefecture in Japan, unusual because it is at the same time the city's main avenue and the approach (sandō (参道)) of its largest Shinto shrine, Tsurugaoka Hachiman-gū

== People ==
- Kenji Wakamiya (born 1961), Japanese politician, a member of the House of Representatives in the Diet (national legislature).

== Ships and carriers ==
- Japanese seaplane carrier Wakamiya, a seaplane carrier of the Imperial Japanese Navy and the first Japanese aircraft carrier. Converted from a transport ship in 1914. she was stricken in 1931
- Japanese escort ship Wakamiya, an Etorofu-class escort ship launched in 1943 and sunk the same year
- Wakamiya-maru, a Japanese cargo ship whose crew members became the first Japanese to circumnavigate the globe after their ship went off course after getting caught in a storm en route from Ishinomaki in the Tōhoku region of northern Japan to Edo (now Tokyo) in November 1793.
