= Imizu Shrine =

Shinto Shrine

- 射水神社
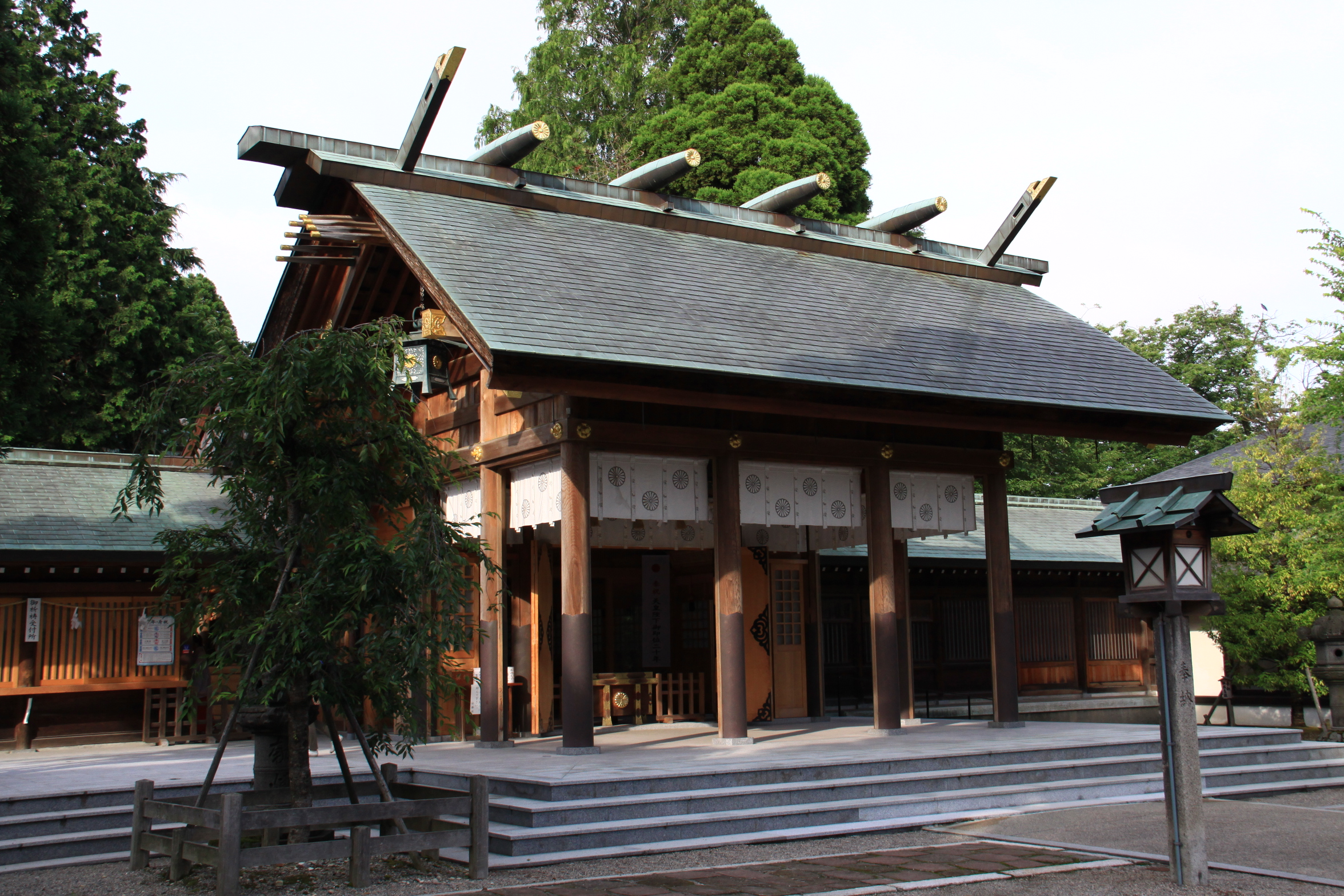
- Haiden of Imizu Shrine

- Location within Toyama Prefecture Location within Japan

Religion
- Affiliation: Shinto
- Deity: Ninigi
- Festival: April 23

Location
- Location: 1-1 Kojo, Takaoka-shi, Toyama-ken, Japan
- Interactive map of Imizu Shrine
- Coordinates: 36°44′54.7″N 137°1′16.8″E

Architecture
- Style: shinmei-zukuri
- Established: pre-Nara period

Website
- Official website

Imizu Shrine (射水神社, Imizu Jinja) is a Shinto shrine located in the Kojo neighborhood of the city of Takaoka, Toyama Prefecture, Japan. It one of four shrines claiming the title of ichinomiya of former Etchū Province. The main festival of the shrine is held annually on April 23.

== Enshrined kami ==
The kami enshrined at Imizu Jinja is:

- Futagami-no-kami (二上神), which is identified with Ninigi-no-mikoto, and the ancestral spirit of the Imizu kuni no miyatsuko

== History ==
The foundation of shrine is uncertain, but is believed to be from before the Nara period. According to shrine legend, Mount Futagami was worshipped as a sacred mountain since ancient times. In 717 AD, the wandering monk Gyōki visited the area, and built the temple of Yōrō-ji at the base of the mountain to subsume the mountain cult into Buddhism under shinbutsu-shūgō. The shrine first appears in documentary records in the 780 AD Shoku Nihongi, where it is recorded as having received the court rank equivalent of Lower 5th Rank, Junior grade. It was promoted to Lower 5th rank Senior grade per the 795 AD Nihon Kōki and to Senior 4th Rank senior grade per the 840 AD Shoku Nihon Kōki. In 854 AD, it was granted Junior 3rd Rank Nihon Montoku Tennō Jitsuroku, and in 859 AD advanced to Senior 3rd Rank per the Nihon Sandai Jitsuroku.The name of the shrine appears in a poem by Ōtomo no Yakamochi in the Man'yōshū poetry anthology, which is another indication of its fame and status. Per the 927 AD Engishiki, the shrine is listed as the largest shrine is Izumi County of Etchū Province. The shrine was initially regarded as the Ni-no-miya of Etchū Province, and became the ichinomiya of the province when Noto Province was separated from Etchū, with the former ichinomiya, Keta Taisha, falling within the borders of Noto Province. The shrine burned down during the Jōhei era (931–937) AD, and never regained its former prominence. It was rebuilt in 1475 and destroyed again in the Sengoku period. After the establishment of the Tokugawa shogunate, it was patronized by the Maeda clan and ancient yamabushi rituals were revived.

Following the Meiji restoration, the shrine was deprived of its revenues under the shinbutsu bunri decrees and its Buddhist facilities quickly fell into ruin. With the establishment of State Shinto, the shrine was designated as a National shrine, 2nd rank (国幣中社; kokuhei-chūsha). The shrine was relocated to its present location within the former second bailey of Takaoka Castle in 1875 – a move greatly opposed by the inhabitants of its former location, who were angered that the government was depriving them of their ancient place of worship.

The new shrine was destroyed in June 1900 during the Great Takaoka Fire, and was rebuilt in 1902. The current Shinmei-zukuri-style Honden dates from this time.

The shrine is located a 15-minute walk from Takaoka Station.

== Gallery ==
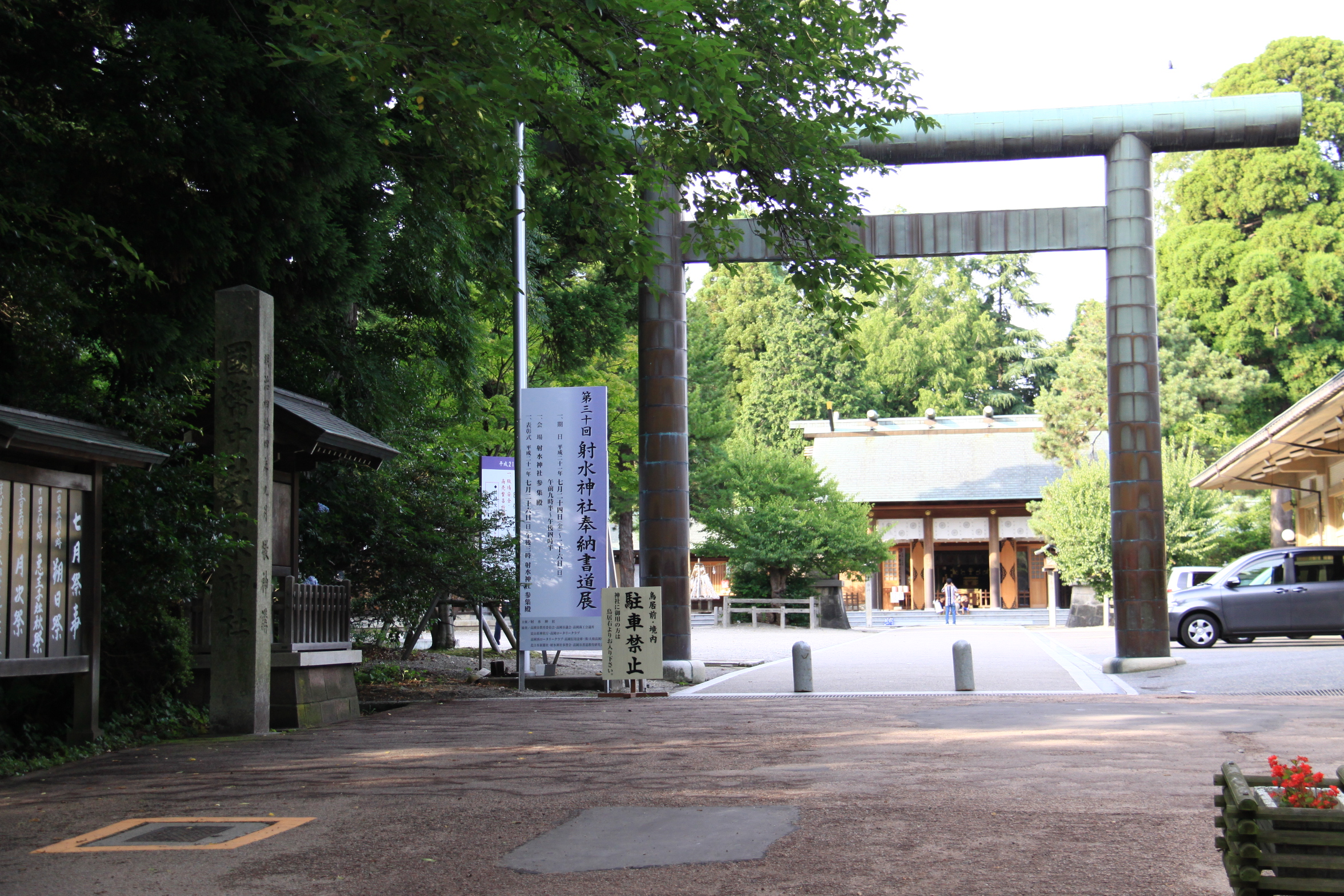
Torii

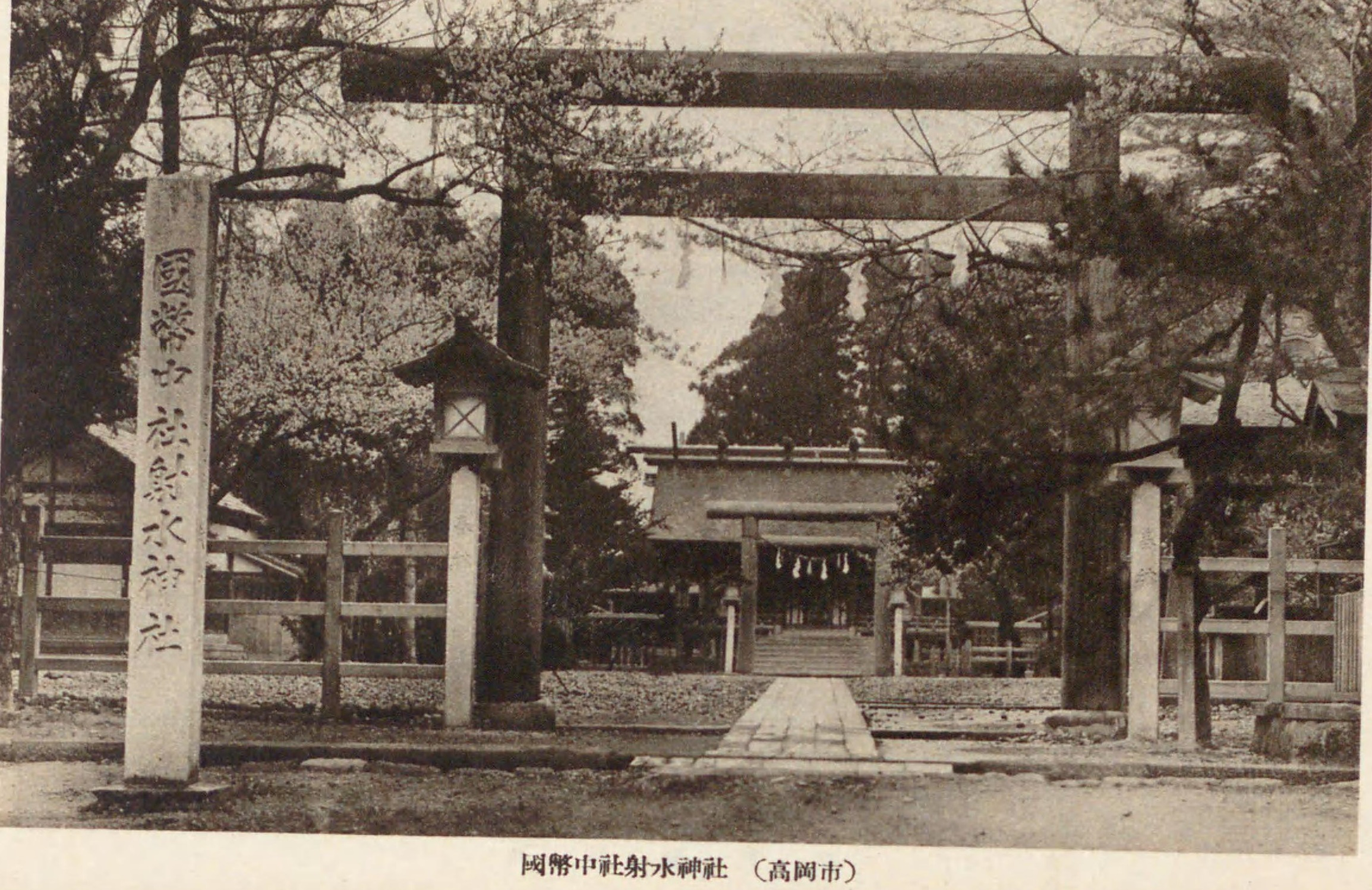
Imizu Shrine in 1938

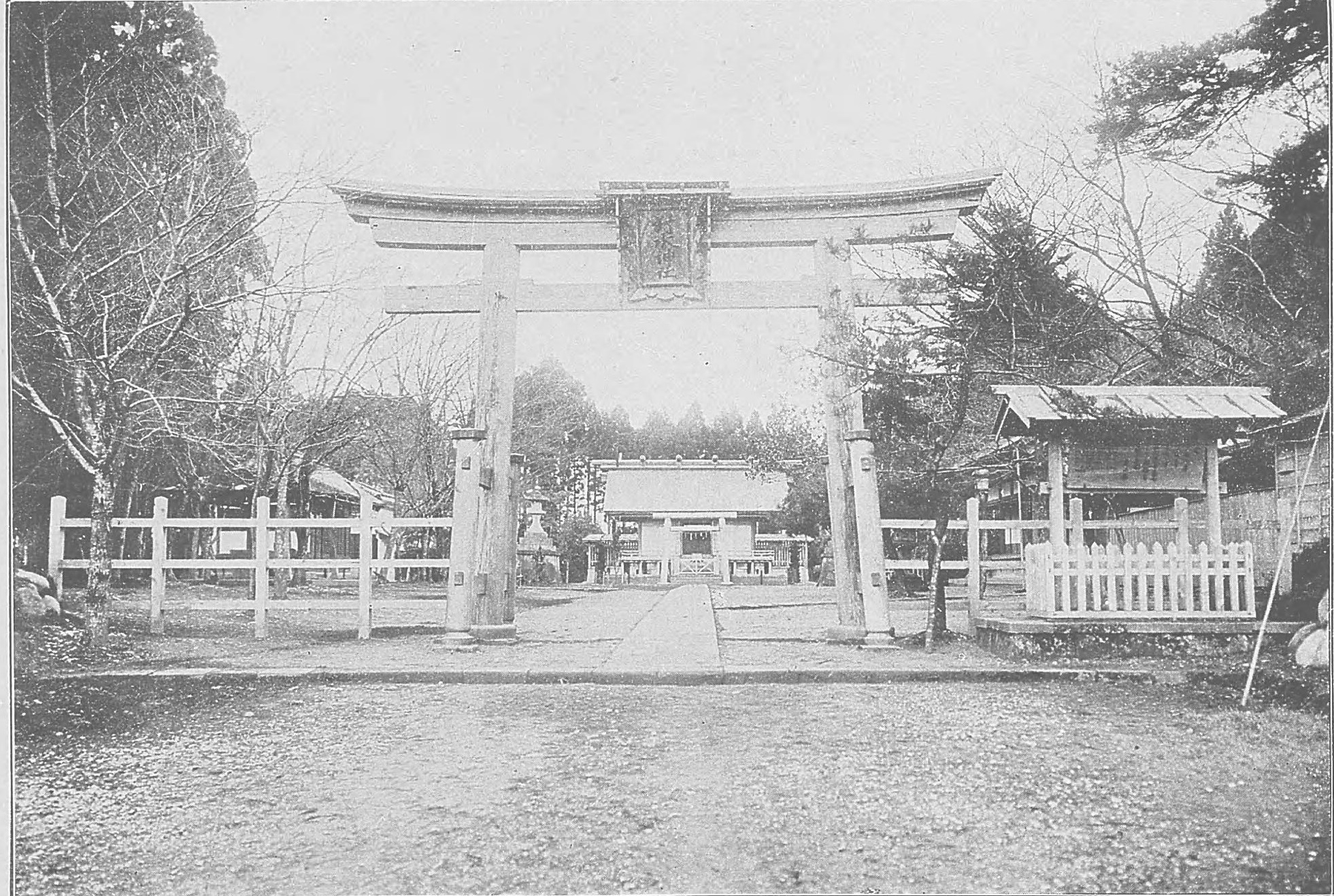
Imizu Shrine in 1909

== See also ==
- List of Shinto shrines
- Ichinomiya
- Other shrines claiming to be Etchū Ichinomiya
  - Keta Jinja
  - Takase Shrine
  - Oyama Shrine
