= Keta Jinja =

Shinto shrine in Takaoka, Toyama, Japan

Keta Shrine
- 気多神社
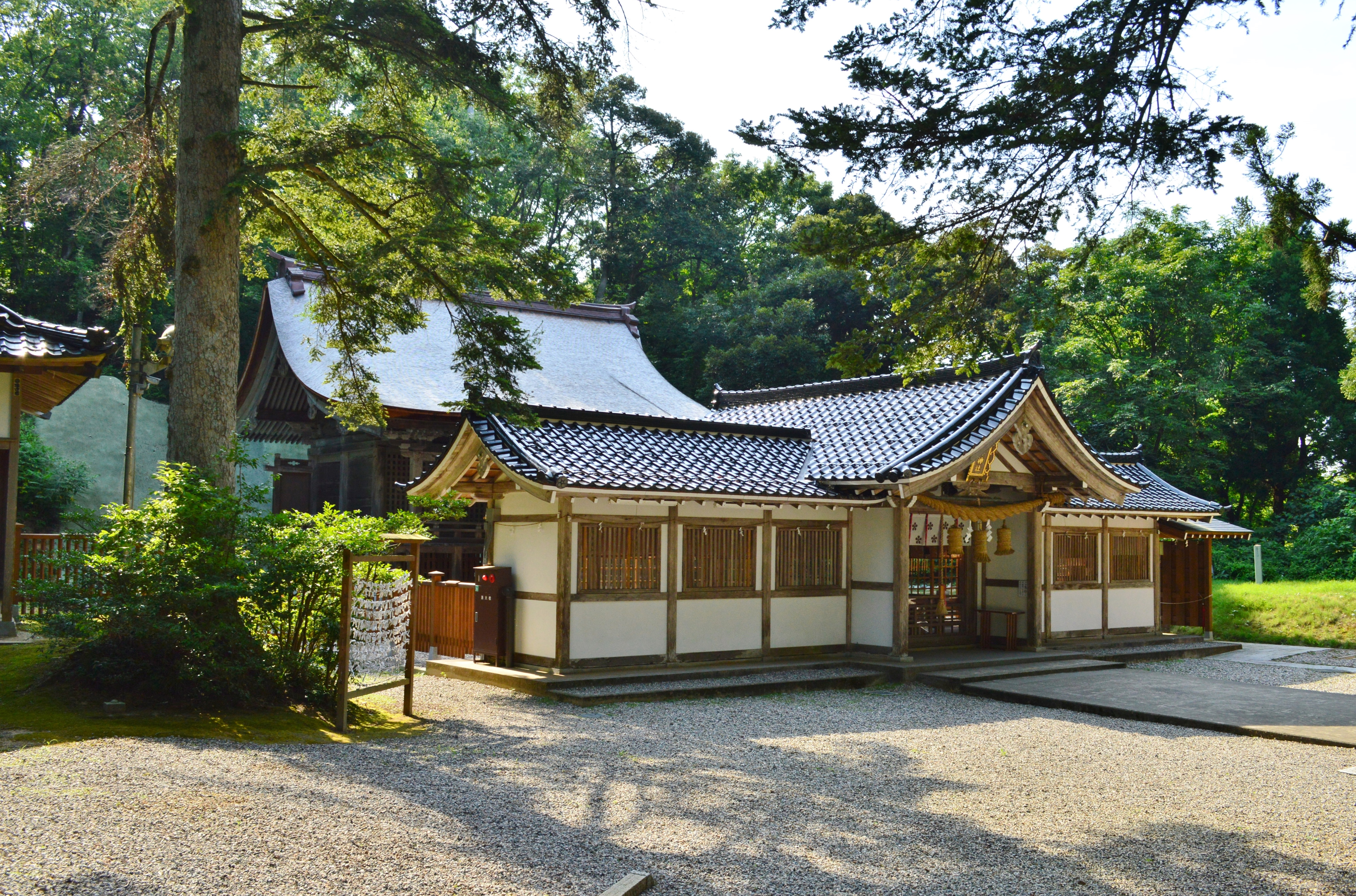
- Shaden of Keta Shrine

- Location within Toyama Prefecture Location within Japan

Religion
- Affiliation: Shinto
- Deity: Ōkuninushi
- Festival: April 18

Location
- Location: 1-10-1 Fushikiichinomiya, Takaoka-shi, Toyama-ken
- Interactive map of Keta Shrine
- Coordinates: 36°48′0.8″N 137°2′39.5″E

Architecture
- Style: Nagare-zukuri
- Established: Nara period

Keta Shrine (気多神社, Keta Jinja) is a Shinto shrine located in the Fushiki-ichinomiya neighborhood of the city of Takaoka, Toyama Prefecture, Japan. It one of four shrines claiming the title of ichinomiya of former Etchū Province, and has one of the strongest claims, as it is located in close proximity to the ruins of the provincial capital, kokubunji and the Sōja of Etchū Province, and the local place name is also ichinomiya". The main festival of the shrine is held annually on April 18.

== Enshrined kami ==
The primary kami enshrined at Keta Jinja are:

- Ōkuninushi (大己貴命), who is called "Onamuchi-no-mikoto" at this location
- Nunakawa-hime-no-mikoto (奴奈加波比売命).

The secondary kami nshrined at Keta Jinja are:

- Kukurhime-no-mikoto (菊理姫命)
- Kotoshironush-no-mikoto (事代主命).

== History ==
The foundation of Keta Jinja is uncertain. The shrine claims that it was founded in 717 AD, but there is no documentary evidence for this. Noto Province was separated from Etchū in 718, reunited in 741 and separated again in 757. Per historical records, the Keta Taisha in Noto regarded as the ichinomiya during this period, but after the final separation of these provinces, a new ichinomiya needed to be designated within the reduced borders of Etchū. The new shrine was initially called the Shinketa Myōjin, or "New Keta Shrine" in Nara period records, and its designation as ichinomiya immediately created a conflict with Imizu Jinja, an existing shrine which had previously served as the ichinomiya during the initial separation of the two provinces.

In the 927 AD Engishiki records, the shrine is named the "Ichinomiya Keta Shrine" but is listed as the 13th and most recent of the shrines in Imizu District. The conflict between Keta Jinja and Imizu Jinja would continue for centuries and would never be fully resolved. The Kita Shrine was rebuilt in the Juei era (1182–1184) by Kiso Yoshinaka after it had been destroyed by a fire. It was again rebuilt by Uesugi Kenshin in the Eiroku era (1558–1570). Under the Edo Period Tokugawa shogunate, Etchū came under the control of the Maeda clan, who continued to patronize the shrine until the Meiji restoration.

With the establishment of State Shinto, the shrine was designated as a prefectural shrine (県社). In 1931, the Honden of the shrine, dating from the Muromachi period, was designated a National Important Cultural Property.

The shrine is located a 15-minute walk from Etchū-Kokubu Station on the JR West Himi Line.

== Gallery ==
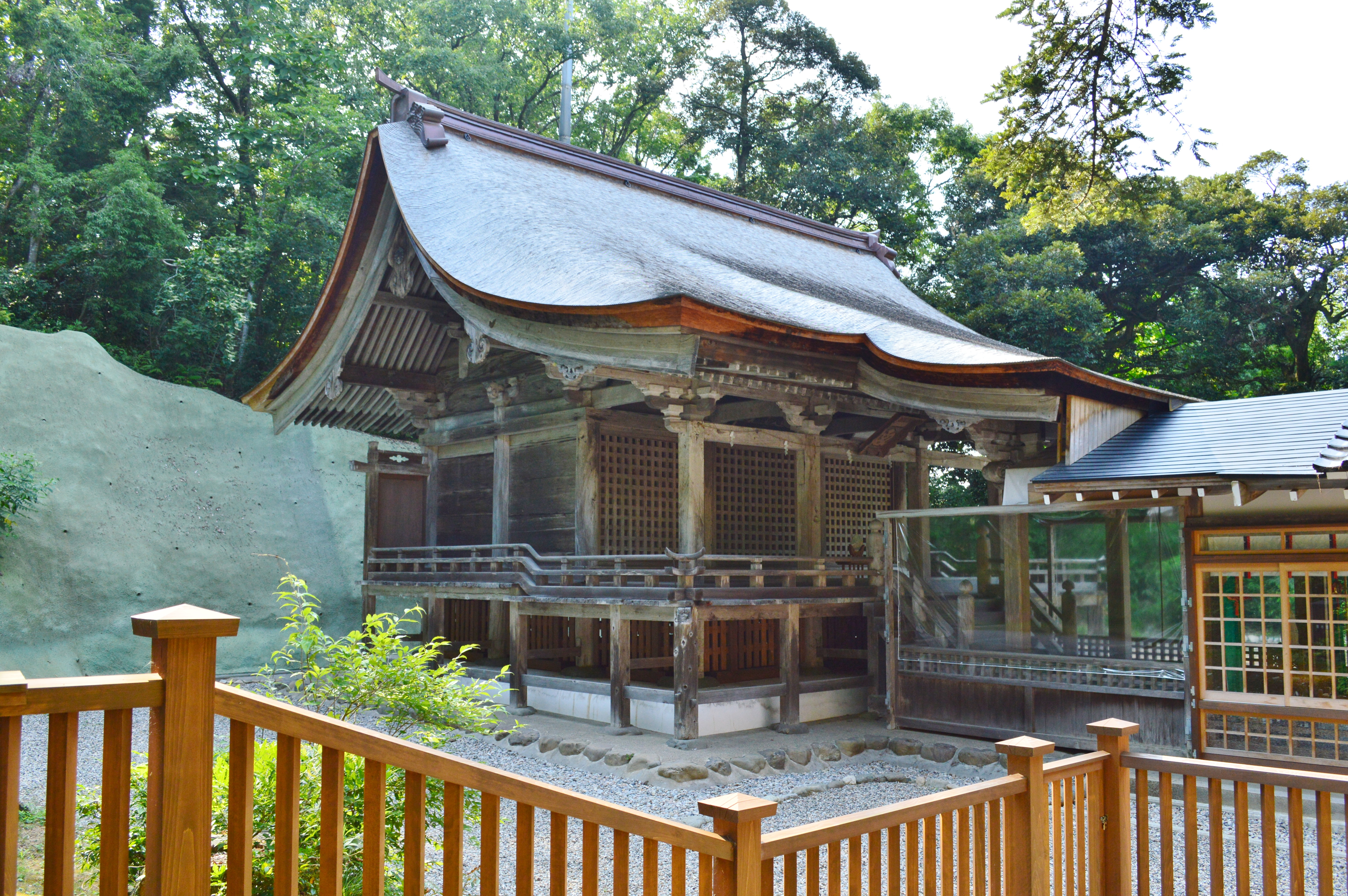
Honden (ICP)

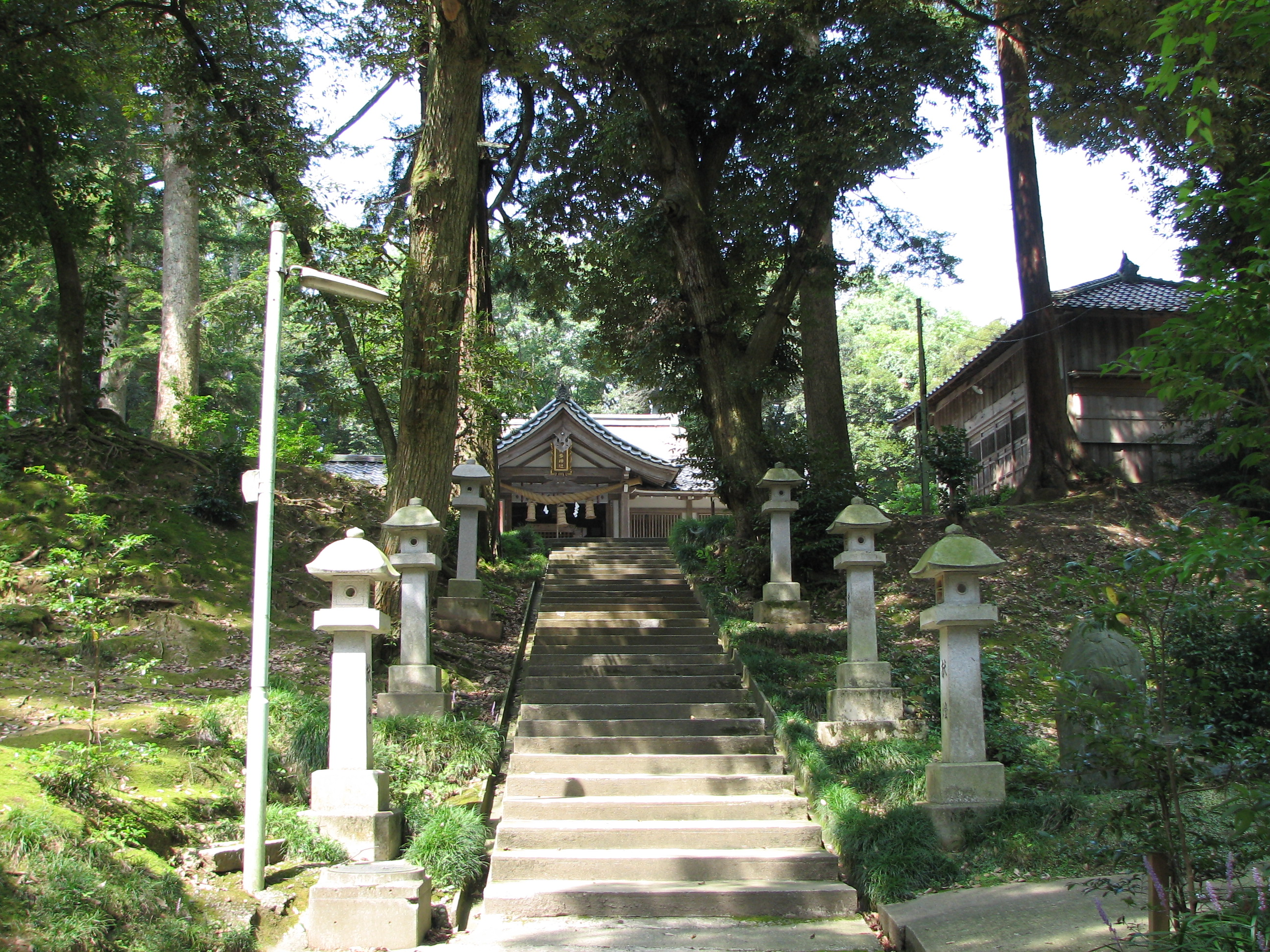
Entrance

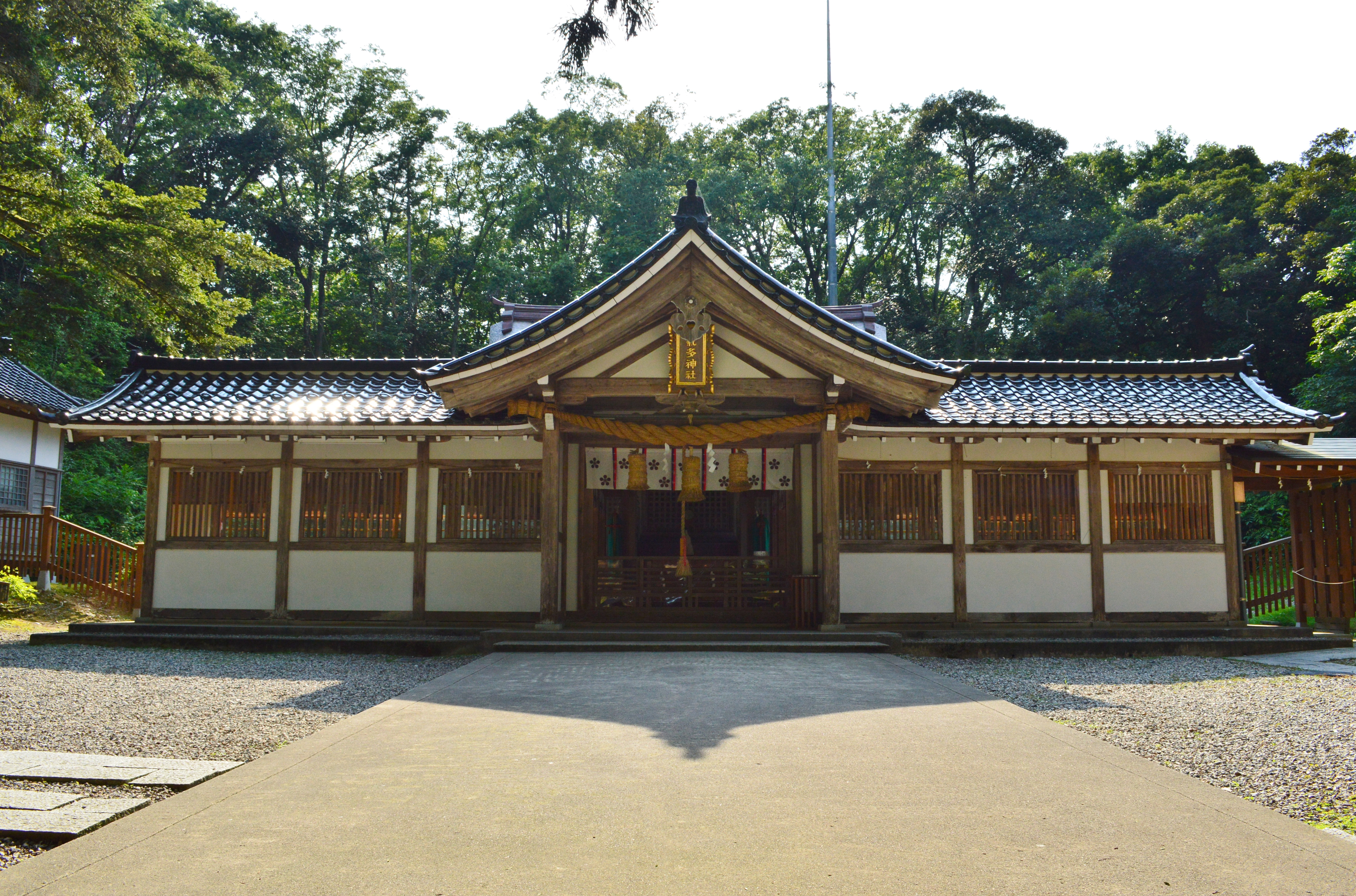
Haiden

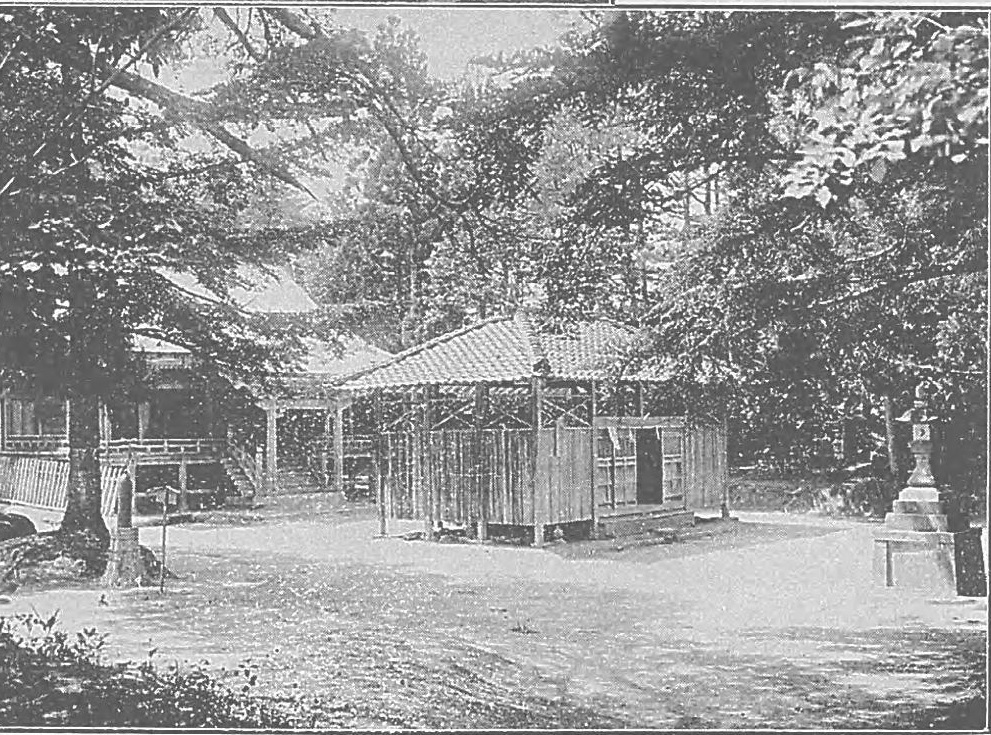
Keta Jinja in 1909

== Cultural Properties ==
=== Important Cultural Properties ===
- Honden (本殿), Muromachi period, dated 1467–1572, designated a National Important Cultural Property in 1931.

== See also ==
- List of Shinto shrines
- Ichinomiya
- Other shrines claiming to be Etchū Ichinomiya
  - Imizu Shrine
  - Takase Shrine
  - Oyama Shrine
