= Takase Shrine =

Shinto shrine

- 高瀬神社
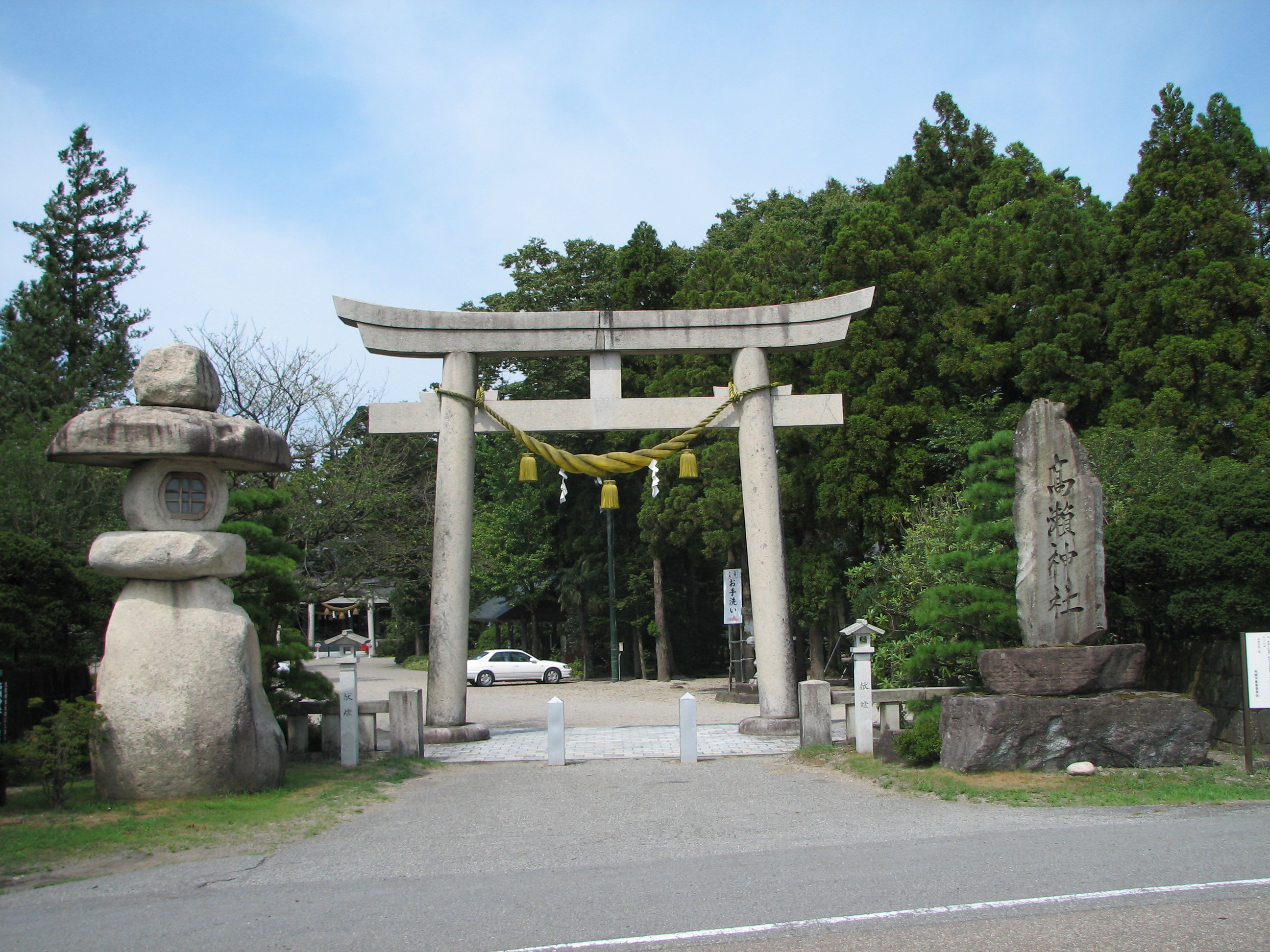
- Torii at Takase Shrine

- Takase Jinja Takase Shrine (Japan)

Religion
- Affiliation: Shinto
- Deity: Ōkuninushi
- Festival: September 13

Location
- Location: 291 Takase, Nanto-shi, Toyama-ken 932-0252
- Interactive map of Takase Shrine
- Coordinates: 36°34′18.7″N 136°56′53.7″E

Architecture
- Established: pre-Nara period

Website
- Official website

Takase Shrine (高瀬神社, Takase-jinja) is a Shinto shrine located in the Takase neighborhood of the city of Nanto, Toyama Prefecture, Japan. It one of four shrines claiming the title of ichinomiya of former Etchū Province. The shrine's main festival is held annually on September 13.

== Enshrined kami ==
The kami enshrined at Takase Jinja are:

- Ōkuninushi (大己貴命).
- Ame-no-ikutama-no-mikoto (天活玉命)
- Isotakeru-no-kami (五十猛神)

== History ==
The original construction of Takase Jinja is uncertain. Worship of Ōkuninushi was widespread in the Hokuriku region from before the Nara period and is believed to have been brought to this area by migrants from Izumo. The shrine claims to have been founded during the reign of the semi-legendary Kofun period Emperor Keikō (reigned 71–130 AD)

The first mention of the shrine in historical records is in an entry in the 780 AD Shoku Nihongi when it was recorded that the shrine was granted the rank of Junior 5th Rank, Lower Grade (従五位下). Per the 795 AD Nihon Kōki it was promoted to Junior 5th Rank, Upper Grade, and the 840 AD Shoku Nihon Kōki states that it was promoted from Junior 4th Rank, Lower Grade to Junior 4th Rank, Upper Grade, and per the 854 AD Nihon Montoku Tennō Jitsuroku, it had been accorded Junior 3rd Rank. Per the 859 AD Nihon Sandai Jitsuroku, it had advanced to Senior 3rd Rank. While these are indications of its high status, in the Engishiki records compiled in 927 AD it is listed as only one of seven minor shrines in Tonami County of Etchū Province. However, late in the Heian period, the provincial capital of Etchū was relocated to Tonami, and the Takase Jinja was elevated to an ichinomiya and was greatly enlarged. Under the Shinbutsu-shūgō movement joining Shintoism and Buddhism, it once had 300 Buddhist chapels. This period of prosperity was short-lived. With the growth of the Ikkō-shū movement in Etchū and the various battles of the Sengoku period, the area around the Takase Jinja was devastated, and it fell largely into ruin. After the establishment of the Tokugawa shogunate and the creation of Toyama Domain, the shrine was revived with the patronage of the Maeda clan. Following the Meiji restoration, with the establishment of State Shinto in 1872, the shrine was originally designed as a "prefectural shrine" under the a Modern system of ranked Shinto Shrines, but was later raised in status to a National Shrine,3rd Rank (国幣小社, kokuhei-shōsha) in 1923.

The shrine is located a 40 minute walk from Fukuno Station on the JR West Jōhana Line.

== Gallery ==
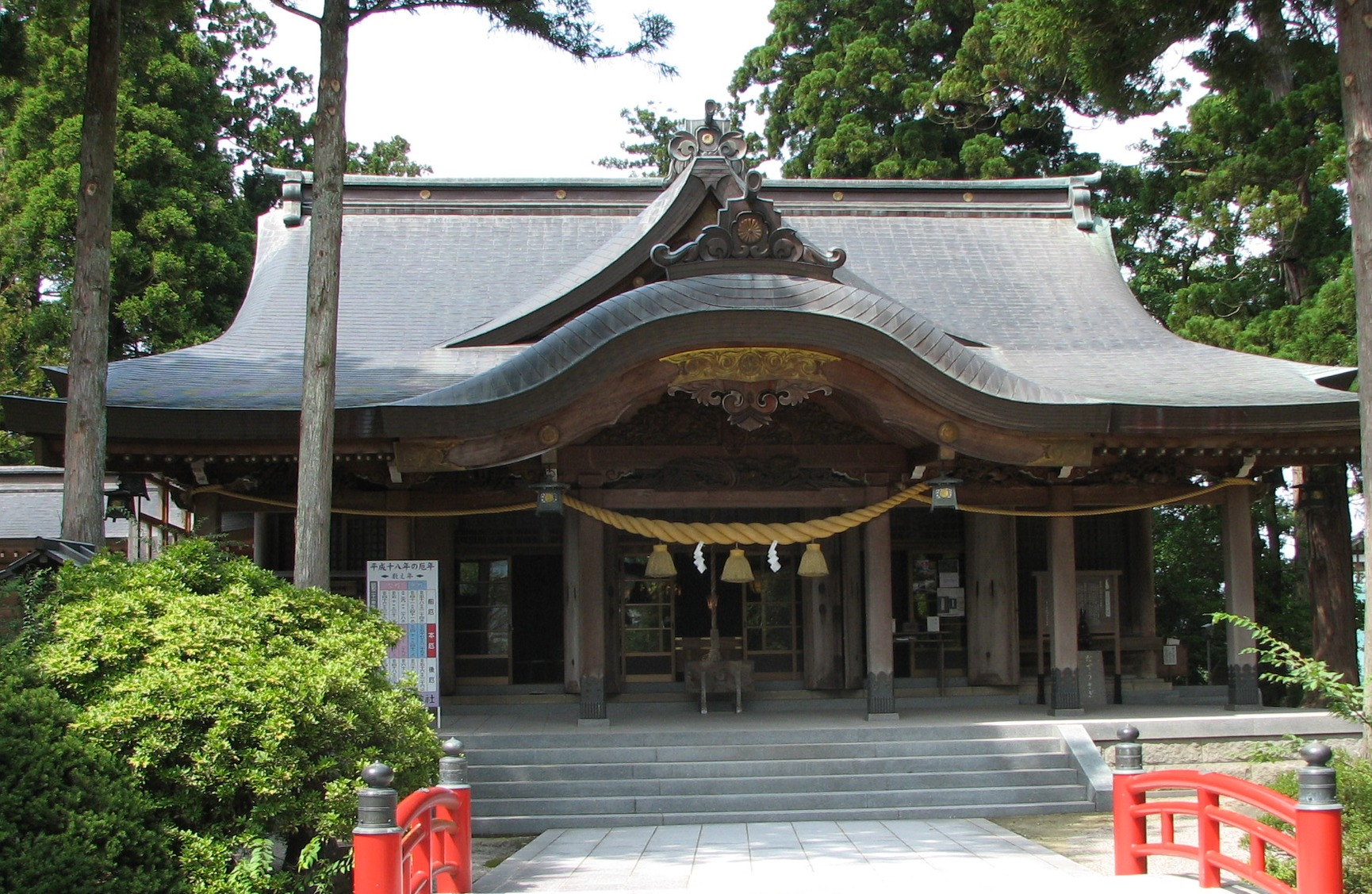
Haiden

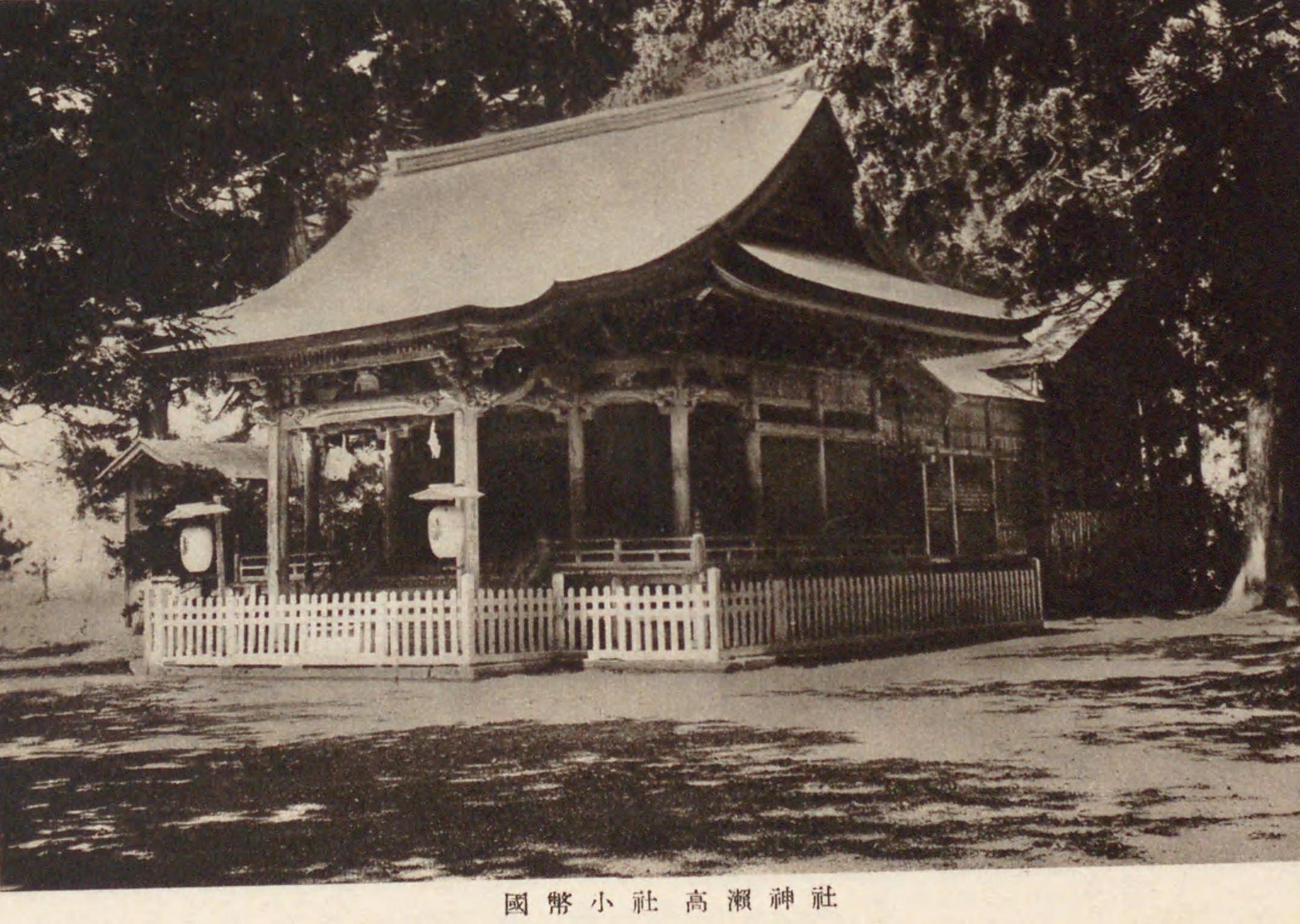
Takase Jinja in 1938

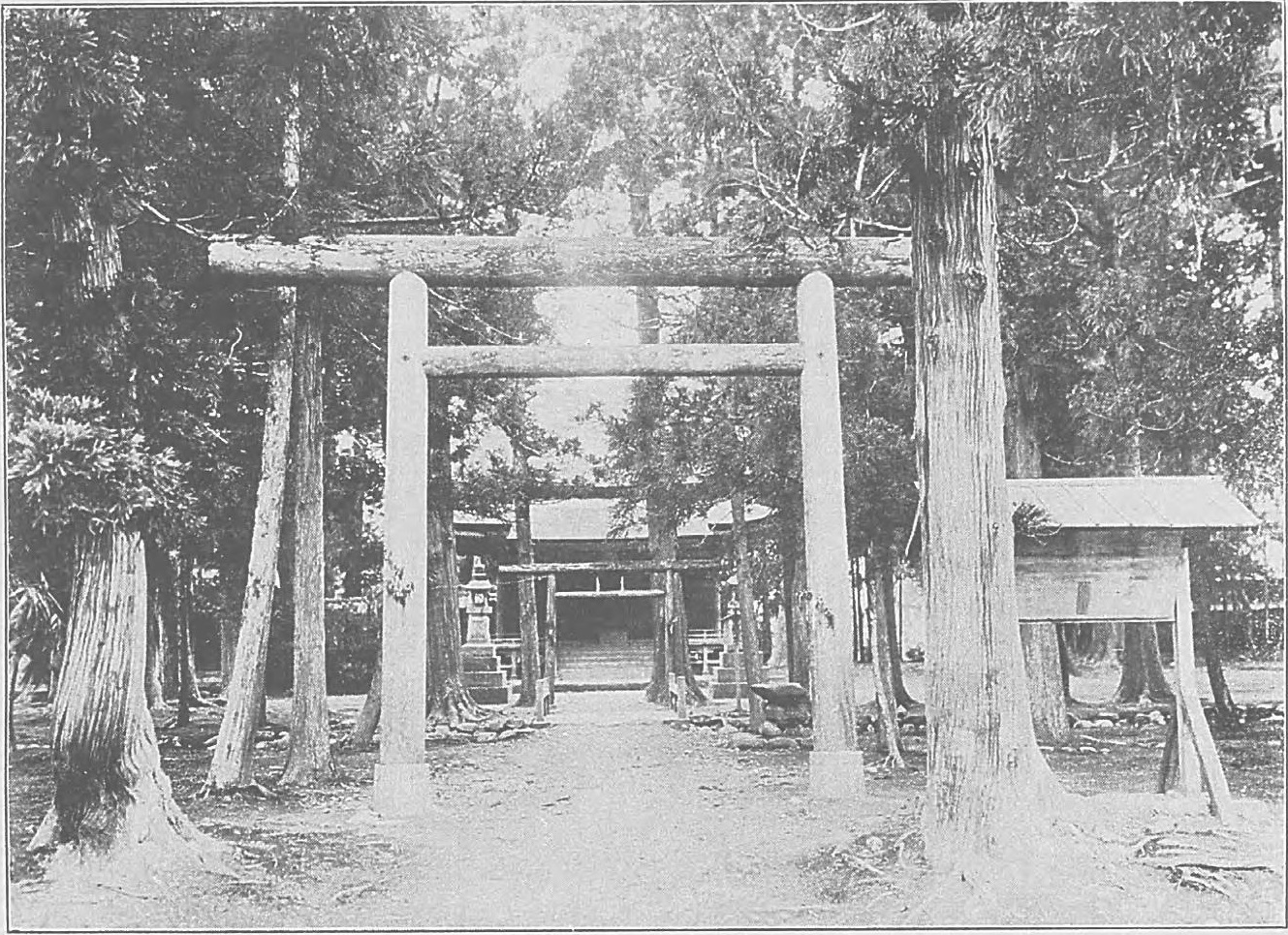
Takase Jinja in 1909

== See also ==
- List of Shinto shrines in Japan
- Ichinomiya
- Other shrines claiming to be Etchū Ichinomiya
  - Imizu Shrine
  - Keta Jinja
  - Oyama Shrine
