= Keta Wakamiya Shrine =

Shinto shrine in Gifu Prefecture, Japan

Keta Wakamiya Shrine 気多若宮神社
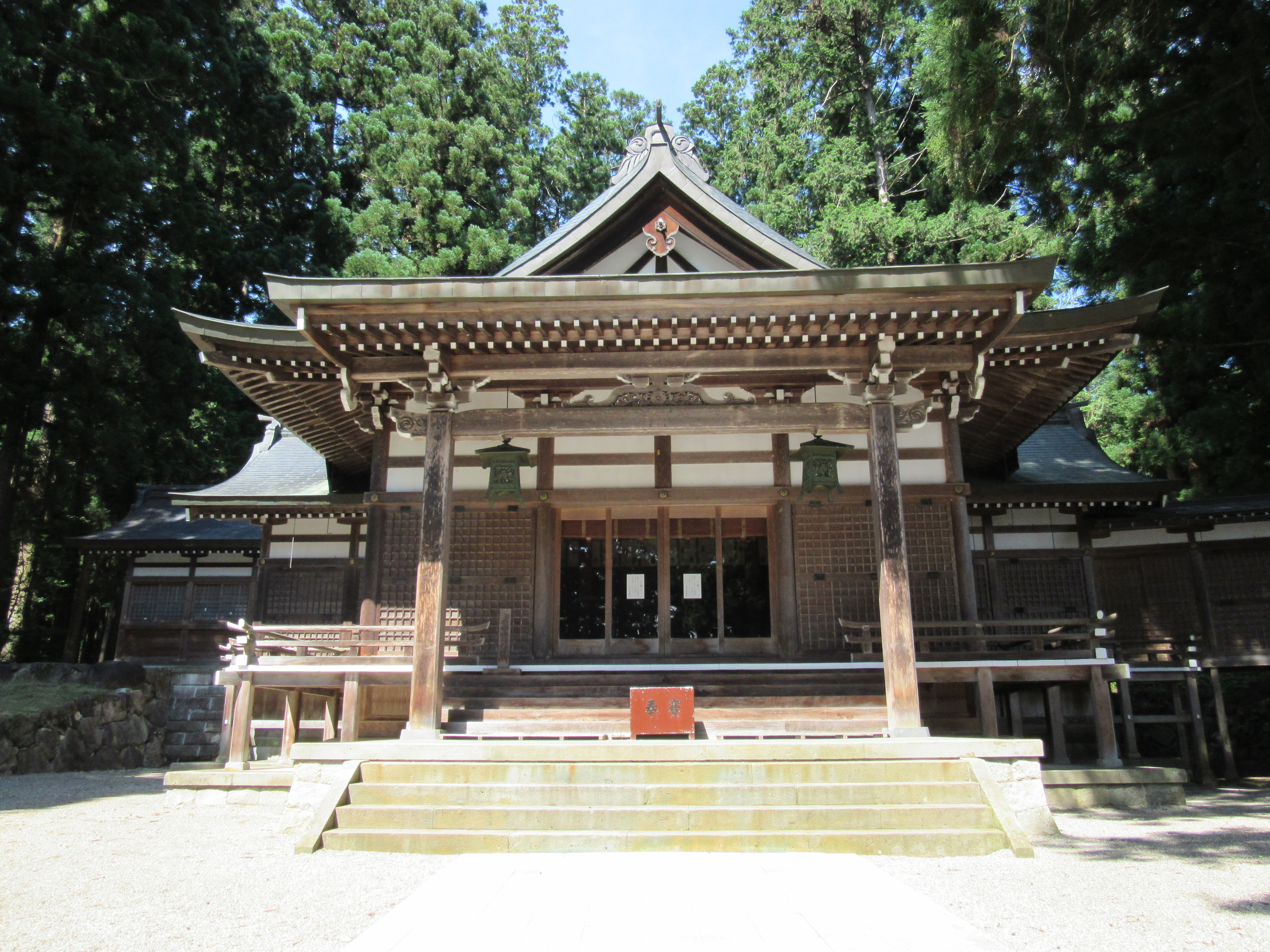
- Heiden of Keta Wakamiya Jinja

- Location within Japan

Religion
- Affiliation: Shinto
- Deity: Ōkuninushi and Kinomata-no-kami
- Leadership: Hito Higashimichi

Location
- Location: 1297 Kami-keta, Hida-shi, Gifu-ken
- Interactive map of Keta Wakamiya Shrine 気多若宮神社
- Coordinates: 36°14′22.17″N 137°11′52.38″E

Architecture
- Established: Heian period

Keta Wakamiya Shrine (気多若宮神社, Keta Wakamiya Jinja) is a Shinto shrine located in the city of Hida, Gifu Prefecture, Japan. It is commonly referred to as "Sugimoto-sama" (杉本さま).

== History ==
The original construction of this shrine is unknown, but it is said to have been constructed during the Heian period. Ōkuninushi and Kinomata-no-kami (木俣神) are the main gods of the shrine, but Amaterasu is also worshipped here.

== Recognition ==
Keta Wakamiya Shrine is one of the shrines included in the Furukawa festival, which is one of the three main naked festivals in Japan and is designated as an Intangible Cultural Properties of Japan.

== See also ==
- Keta Taisha
- List of Shinto shrines
