= Keta Taisha =

Shinto shrine in Hakui, Ishikawa prefecture, Japan

Keta Shrine 気多大社
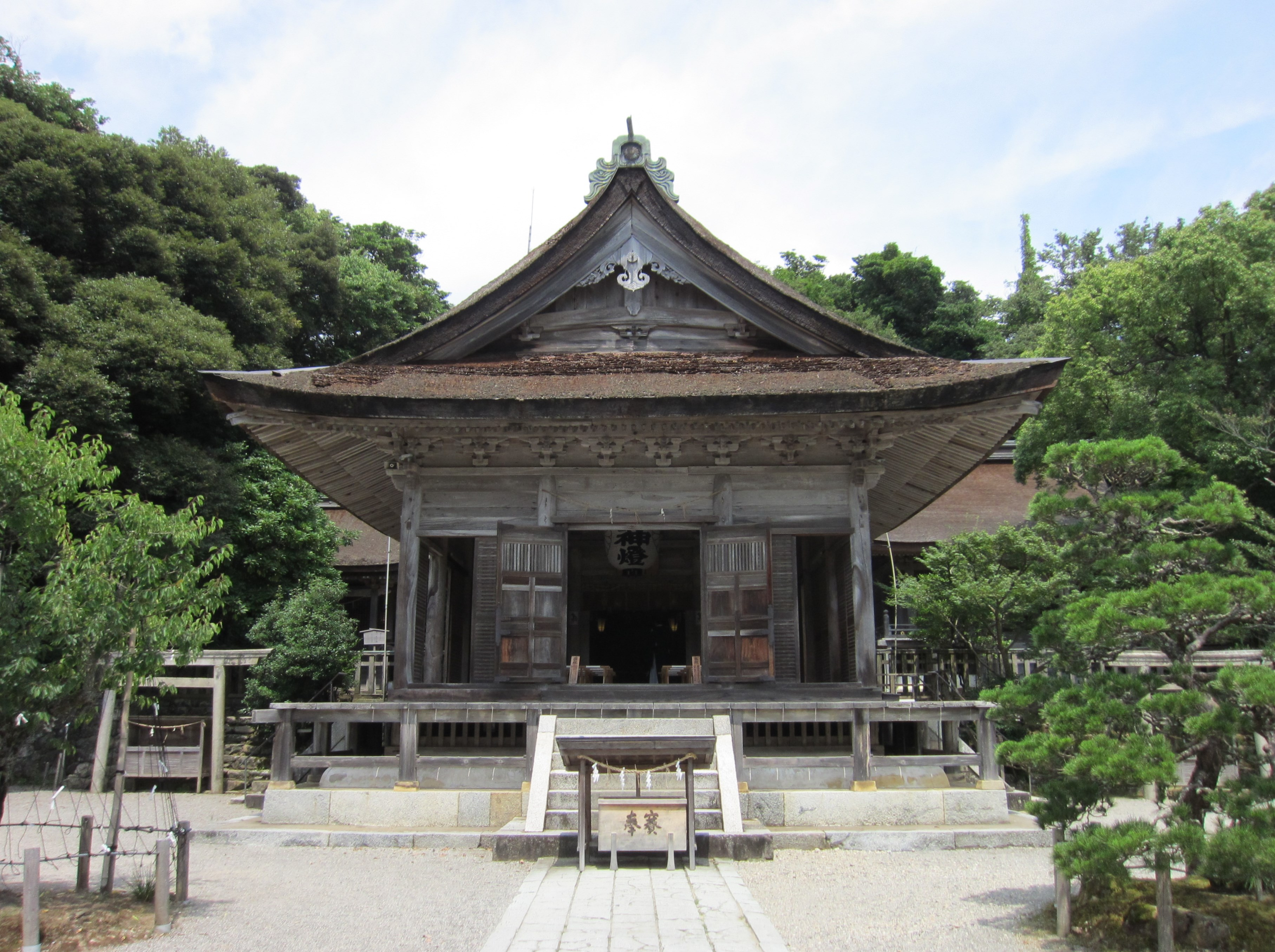
- Haiden of Keta Taisha

- Location within Ishikawa Prefecture Location within Japan

Religion
- Affiliation: Shinto
- Deity: Ōkuninushi

Location
- Location: Hakui-shi, Ishikawa-ken
- Interactive map of Keta Shrine 気多大社
- Coordinates: 36.9260°N 136.7675°E

Architecture
- Established: pre-Nara period

Keta Shrine (気多大社, Keta Taisha) is a Shinto shrine located in the city of Hakui, Ishikawa Prefecture, Japan. It was the ichinomiya of former Noto Province. The main kami enshrined is Ōkuninushi. The shrine's main festival is held annually on April 3.

== History ==
The original construction of this shrine is unknown, but it is said to have been constructed on the location where Ōkuninushi landed with 300 of his folders from Izumo to subdue the inhabitants of Noto Peninsula during the reign of the demi-legendary 8th Emperor Kōgen or 10th Emperor Sujin. The shrine is first mentioned in history in a poem in the Man'yōshū by Otomo no Yakamochi dated 748 AD. It is also mentioned in the 768 AD Shoku Nihongi, and by the 859 AD Nihon Sandai Jitsuroku, it had been accorded 1st Court Rank.

The shrine was patronised by the Maeda clan during the Edo period and a number of its structures date from this time. Under the pre-World War II Modern system of ranked Shinto Shrines, the shrine was classified as a national shrine of the first rank (国幣大社, kokuhei taisha).

== Cultural Properties ==
=== National Important Cultural Properties ===
- Haiden (本殿), Edo period (1787); The main hall is a rare remnant of the Ryonare-zukuri style. It is one of the masterpieces of Shimizu Tashirō, the head carpenter of Kaga Domain.
- Heiden (拝殿), Edo period (1653);
- Shinmon gate (神門), late Muromachi period (1467-1572);
- Sessha Hakusan Jinja Haiden (摂社白山神社本殿), Edo period (1787);
- Sessha Wakamiya Jinja Haiden (摂社若宮神社本殿), late Muromachi period (1569);
- Letter from Lady of Emperor Go-Nara (後奈良天皇女房奉書), Muromachi period;

=== National Tangible Cultural Folk Properties ===
- Keta Cormorant Festival Customs (気多の鵜祭の習俗), Cormorants brought from Shikado Island in Unoura-cho, Nanao City are released in front of the shrine, and when they land, they are captured and released into the sky on the coast. The cormorants' movements from the time they are released in front of the shrine until they land are used to predict whether they will have a good or bad harvest, and on the way, the color and movements of the cormorants' feathers can also be used to predict whether they will have a good or bad harvest and the weather;

=== Ishikawa Prefecture Designated Tangible Cultural Properties ===
- Shinko warhouse (神庫),
- Zuishinmon gate (随身門),
- Keta Jinja records (気多神社文書), 1681 items

== See also ==
- Keta Wakamiya Shrine
- List of Shinto shrines
