= Modern system of ranked Shinto shrines =

Establishment of State Shinto Shrines

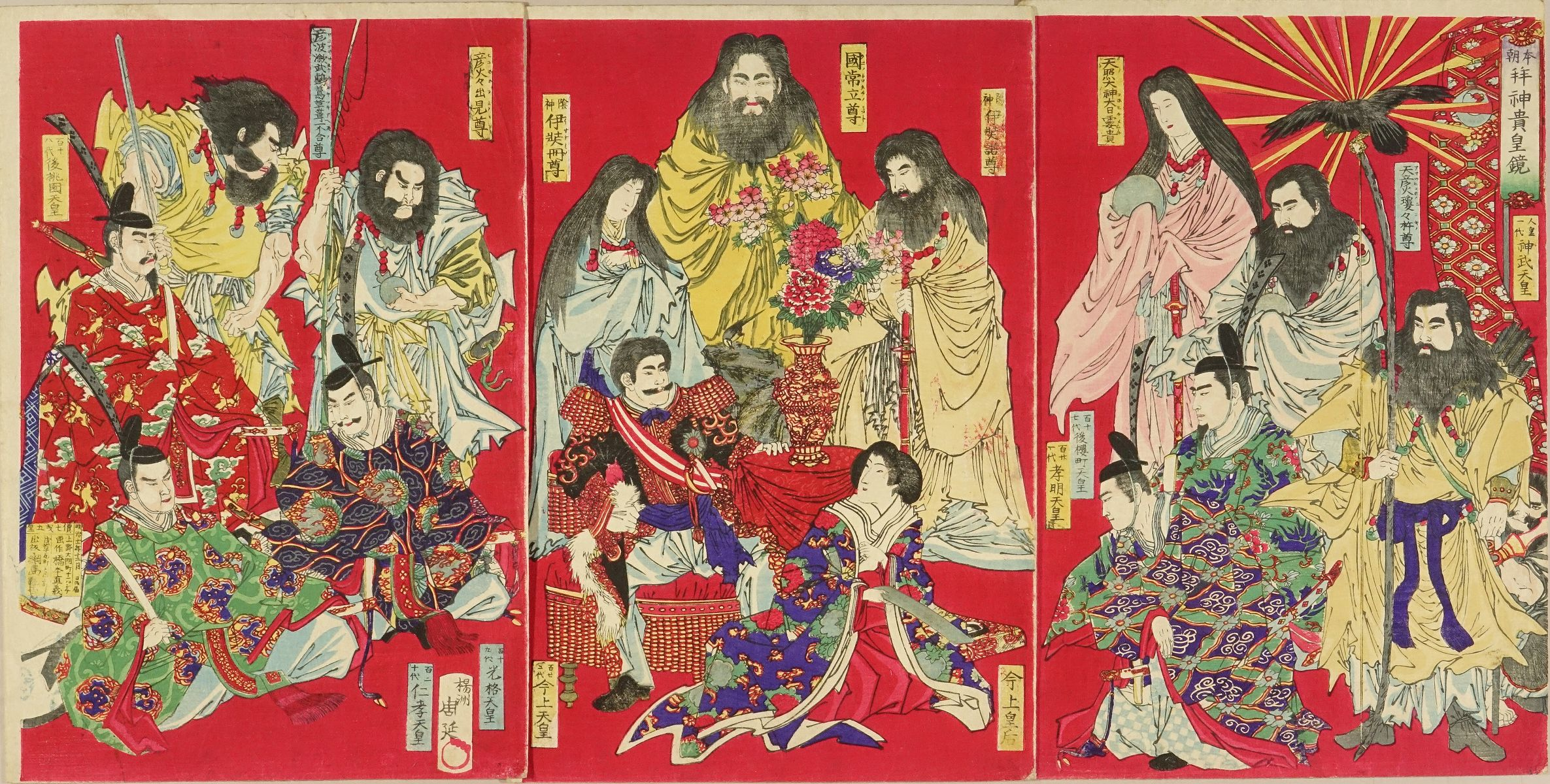
1878 engraving by Yōshū Chikanobu (1838–1912). The figures represented in these three panels are: * Centre: Front. Emperor Meiji in a Western chair with his wife, Empress Shōken, seated in the foreground. The Imperial couple are accompanied behind and in the flanking panels with an array of Shinto kami and historical figures from Japan's past. Rear. The kami Izanami, Kunitokotatchi and Izanagi. * Right: Front. Emperor Kōmei (seated in foreground), Empress Go-Sakuramachi (here presented as a man with a false goatee), and Emperor Jinmu (carrying a rough bow and perched eagle. Rear. The kami Amaterasu (standing and holding the three Sacred Treasures of Japan) and Ninigi-no-Mikoto (who first brought to earth the Imperial regalia—the sword, Kusanagi, the mirror, Yata no Kagami, and the jewel, Yasakani no magatama). * Left: Front: Emperor Go-Momozono (clothed in red), Emperor Kōkaku (clothed in black) and Emperor Ninkō (clothed in green). Rear. The kami Hiko-hohodemi (clothed in white) and Ugayafukiaezu (clothed in yellow).

The modern system of ranked Shinto shrines (近代社格制度, Kindai Shakaku Seido; sometimes called simply shakaku (社格)) was an organizational aspect of the establishment of Japanese State Shinto. This system classified Shinto shrines as either official government shrines or "other" shrines. The official shrines were divided into

1. Imperial shrines (kampeisha), which are parsed into minor, medium, or major sub-categories; and
2. National shrines (kokuheisha), which are similarly categorized as minor, medium, or major.

Some shrines are the "first shrines" called ichinomiya that have the highest rank in their respective provinces of Japan.

The Ise Grand Shrine stood at the top of all shrines and thus was outside the classification.

All listed shrines on this page with the exception of Ise Grand Shrine are Beppyo shrines.

== History ==
On the fourteenth day of the fifth month of 1871, by decree of the Dajō-kan, the fundamental elements of the modern shrine system were established: a hierarchic ranking of Shinto shrines, with specification of the grades of priest who could officiate at the various levels of shrine. These rankings were set aside in 1946, when such rankings were deemed "State Shinto" by the Occupation Shinto Directive. The Jinja Honcho currently has a slightly different List of Special Shrines (別表神社, beppyo jinja).

== Ise Grand Shrine ==
Name	Location	Notes
Ise Grand Shrine	Ise, Mie	One of the Twenty-Two Shrines, Upper Seven; Outside of classification due to being first ranked Izawa-no-miya the Shima Province Ichinomiya was considered part of it, as was Izawa-jinja which was also seen as the Shima Province Ichinomiya

Kashima Jingu and Katori Jingu were considered the two shrines directly below Ise Jingu.

== Kan-sha ==
The Kan-sha (官社) or "official government shrines" had two subdivisions, Kanpei-sha or "government shrines" and Kokuhei-sha or "national shrines".

For future tables, red cells denote shrines in the Japanese colonial empire.

=== Kanpei-sha ===
In 1871, the Japanese government established the Kanpei-sha (官幣社) system to classify Shinto shrines based on their level of association with the imperial family. The highest category included shrines that venerated the imperial family members, emperors, or meritorious retainers of the Imperial family. These shrines were considered to be the most closely associated with the imperial family and received government support.

==== Imperial shrines, 1st rank ====
The Kanpei-taisha were the most highly ranked shrines in Japan that were officially designated by the government. There were 67 shrines that held this status, which were closely associated with the imperial family. These shrines were considered to be of great historical and cultural significance, and were often visited by members of the imperial family as well as the general public.

Name	Location	Category	Notes
Katori jingu	Katori, Chiba	Myojin Taisha, Chokusaisha	ichinomiya of Shimōsa Province directly under Ise Grand Shrine, Futsunushi
Kashima Jingū	Kashima, Ibaraki	Myojin Taisha, Chokusaisha	ichinomiya of Hitachi Province directly under Ise Grand Shrine, Takemikazuchi
Iwashimizu Hachimangū	Yawata	Kokushi genzaisha, Chokusaisha	one of the Twenty-Two Shrines, Upper Seven; Homuda-wakeno-mikoto (Emperor Ōjin); Okinaga-tarashi-hime-no-mikoto (Empress Jingū),
Kamigamo Shrine	Kita-ku, Kyoto	Myojin Taisha, Chokusaisha	one of the Twenty-Two Shrines, Upper Seven, combined with Shimogamo Shrine; Wake-ikazuchi-no-kami; ichinomiya of Yamashiro Province
Shimogamo Shrine	Sakyō-ku, Kyoto	Myojin Taisha, Chokusaisha	one of the Twenty-Two Shrines, Upper Seven, combined with Kamigamo Shrine; Tamayori-hime-no-mikoto; Kamo Taeketsunumi-no-mikoto; ichinomiya of Yamashiro Province
Kasuga-taisha	Nara	Myojin Taisha, Chokusaisha	one of the Twenty-Two Shrines, Upper Seven, Takemikazuchi, Futsunushi, Ame no Koyane, Himegami
Matsunoo Taisha	Ukyō-ku, Kyoto	Myojin Taisha	one of the Twenty-Two Shrines, Upper Seven; Oyamakui-no-mikoto; Nakatsushima-hime-no-mikoto, Tsukuyomi-no-Mikoto
Hirano Shrine	Kita-ku, Kyoto	Myojin Taisha	one of the Twenty-Two Shrines, Upper Seven; Imaki-no-kami, Kudo-no-kami; Furuaki-no-kami, Himegami
Fushimi Inari-taisha	Fushimi-ku, Kyoto	Myojin Taisha	one of the Twenty-Two Shrines, Upper Seven; Inari Ōkami, Ukanomitama
Tatsuta Taisha	Sangō, Nara	Myojin Taisha, Chokusaisha	one of the Twenty-Two Shrines, Middle Seven, Shinatsuhiko
Ōmiwa Shrine	Sakurai, Nara	Myojin Taisha	one of the Twenty-Two Shrines, Middle Seven; ichinomiya of Yamato Province Ōmononushi Ōnamuchi Sukunahikona-no-kami Mount Miwa
Isonokami Shrine	Tenri, Nara	Myojin Taisha	one of the Twenty-Two Shrines, Middle Seven, Futsu-no-mitama
Ōyamato Shrine	Tenri, Nara	Myojin Taisha	one of the Twenty-Two Shrines, Middle Seven, Yamato Okunitama
Hirose Taisha	Kawai, Nara	Myojin Taisha	one of the Twenty-Two Shrines, Middle Seven
Sumiyoshi-taisha	Sumiyoshi-ku, Osaka	Myojin Taisha	one of the Twenty-Two Shrines, Middle Seven; ichinomiya of Settsu Province, Sumiyoshi sanjin, Empress Jingū
Hiyoshi Taisha	Ōtsu	Myojin Taisha	one of the Twenty-Two Shrines, Lower Eight, Ninomiya, Ōkuninushi, Oyamakui no Kami
Hirota Shrine	Nishinomiya	Myojin Taisha	one of the Twenty-Two Shrines, Lower Eight, Amaterasu
Yasaka Shrine	Higashiyama-ku, Kyoto	Kokushi genzaisha	one of the Twenty-Two Shrines, Lower Eight, Susanoo-no-Mikoto (Gion cult, Yashimajinumi
Niukawakami Shrine	Higashiyoshino, Nara	Myojin Taisha	one of the Twenty-Two Shrines, Lower Eight
Itsukushima Shrine	Hatsukaichi	Myojin Taisha	ichinomiya of Aki Province proposed addition to the Twenty-Two Shrines, Ichikishimahime, Tagitsuhime, Takiribime
Izumo-taisha	Izumo, Shimane	Myojin Taisha, Chokusaisha	ichinomiya of Izumo Province head shrine of Izumo-taishakyo, sometimes seen as a rival to Ise Grand Shrine, Susanoo-no-Mikoto
Hikawa Shrine	Saitama	Myojin Taisha, Chokusaisha	ichinomiya of Musashi ProvinceSusanoo Kushinadahime Ōkuninushi Ashinazuchi Tenazuchi
Usa Jingū	Usa, Ōita	Myojin Taisha, Chokusaisha	ichinomiya of Buzen ProvinceHachiman
Kashii-gū	Higashi-ku, Fukuoka	Kokushi genzaisha, Chokusaisha	Emperor Chuai, Empress Jingu
Kashihara Jingu	Kashihara, Nara	Chokusaisha	Emperor Jimmu, Himetataraisuzu-hime
Heian Jingu	Sakyō-ku, Kyoto	Chokusaisha	Emperor Kanmu; Emperor Kōmei
Meiji Jingu	Shibuya, Tokyo	Chokusaisha	Emperor Meiji Empress Shoken
Omi Jingū	Ōtsu	Chokusaisha	Emperor Tenji
Awa Shrine	Tateyama, Chiba	Myojin Taisha	ichinomiya of Awa Province Ame-no-Futodama
Aso Shrine	Aso, Kumamoto	Myojin Taisha	ichinomiya of Higo Province Takeiwatatsu-no-Mikoto
Atsuta Jingu	Atsuta-ku, Nagoya	Myojin Taisha	Atsuta no Ōkami Amaterasu Susanoo Yamatotakeru Miyazu-hime Takeinadane
Fujisan Hongū Sengen Taisha	Fujinomiya, Shizuoka	Myojin Taisha	ichinomiya of Suruga Province, Konohanasakuya-hime
Gassan Shrine	Tsuruoka	Myojin Taisha	one of the Three Mountains of Dewa; Tsukuyomi-no-Mikoto
Hakozaki Shrine	Higashi-ku, Fukuoka	Myojin Taisha	ichinomiya of Chikuzen ProvinceEmperor Ōjin Empress Jingū Tamayori-hime
Hinokuma Jingu	Wakayama	Myojin Taisha	ichinomiya of Kii Province, shared with Kunikakasu Shrine;
Hie Shrine	Chiyoda, Tokyo		Oyamakui no Kami
Hiraoka Shrine	Higashiōsaka	Myojin Taisha	ichinomiya of Kawachi Province Ame-no-Koyane, Hime-gami, Futsunushi, Takemikazuchi
Hokkaidō Jingū	Sapporo		ichinomiya of Ezo Province Ōkunitama, Ōkuninushi, and Sukunahikona,
Ikukunitama Shrine	Tennōji-ku, Osaka	Myojin Taisha	
Izanagi Jingu	Awaji, Hyōgo	Myojin Taisha	ichinomiya of Awaji Province Izanagi, Izanami
Kehi Jingu	Tsuruga, Fukui	Myojin Taisha	ichinomiya of Echizen Province
Kagoshima Jingū	Kirishima, Kagoshima	Shikinai Taisha	ichinomiya of Ōsumi ProvinceHoori Toyotama-hime Emperor Chūai Emperor Ōjin Empress Jingū
Kamayama Shrine	Wakayama		Itsuse no Mikoto (彦五瀬命)
Kirishima Jingū	Kirishima, Kagoshima		Konohanasakuya-hime Hoori Toyotama-hime Ugayafukiaezu Tamayori-bime Ninigi-no-Mikoto
Kumano Hongū Taisha	Tanabe, Wakayama	Myojin Taisha	
Kumano Hayatama Taisha	Shingū, Wakayama	Shikinai Taisha	
Kunikakasu Shrine	Wakayama	Myojin Taisha	ichinomiya of Kii Province; shared with Hinokuma Shrine;
Mishima Taisha	Mishima, Shizuoka	Myojin Taisha	ichinomiya of Izu Province, Ōyamatsumi
Miyazaki Jingū	Miyazaki		Emperor Jimmu Ugayafukiaezu Tamayori-bime
Munakata Taisha	Munakata, Fukuoka	Myojin Taisha	Ichikishimahime, Tagitsuhime, Takiribime
Niutsuhime Shrine	Katsuragi, Wakayama	Myojin Taisha	Niutsuhime-no-Ōkami Kōyamiko-no-Ōkami Ōgetsuhime-no-kami Ichikishimahime-no-Ōkami
Ōtori taisha	Sakai	Myojin Taisha	ichinomiya of Izumi Province Ōtori-no-muraji and Yamato Takeru
Suwa-taisha	Suwa, Nagano	Myojin Taisha	ichinomiya of Shinano ProvinceTakeminakata Yasakatome Kotoshironushi
Takebe taisha	Ōtsu	Myojin Taisha	Yamato-takeru-no-mitoko; ichinomiya of Ōmi Province
Taga-taisha	Taga, Shiga		Sannomiya Izanagi, Izanami
Udo Jingū	Nichinan, Miyazaki		Ugayafukiaezu Amaterasu Ame-no-oshihomimi Ninigi-no-Mikoto Hoori Emperor Jimmu
Yoshino Jingu	Yoshino, Nara		Emperor Go-Daigo
Taiwan Grand Shrine	Taipei, Taiwan		now extinct
Karafuto Shrine	Yuzhno-Sakhalinsk, Karafuto Prefecture, Russia		removed from Sakhalin
Chōsen Jingu	Seoul, Korea under Japanese rule		now extinct Kunitama Okami Amaterasu Okami
Fuyo Jingū	Buyeo County, Korea		never completed Emperor Ōjin (Hachiman), Empress Saimei (Empress Kōgyoku), Emperor Tenji, Empress Jingū
Kantō Jingu	Lüshunkou District, Kwantung Leased Territory, China		now extinct Emperor Meiji Amaterasu Omikami
Nan'yō Shrine	Koror, Palau		Amaterasu Ōmikami. holy relics and kami were evacuated by submarine in 1944

==== Imperial shrines, 2nd rank ====
The mid-range of ranked Imperial shrines or Kanpei Chūsha (官幣中社) included 23 sanctuaries. These shrines were considered to be of intermediate rank among the government-supported shrines and were given lesser financial support compared to the Kanpei-taisha.

Name	Location	Category	Notes
Ōharano Shrine.	Nishikyō-ku, Kyoto.	Kokushi genzaisha	Take-mikazuchi-no-mitoko, Futsunushi Ame-no-Koyane, Himegami, one of the Twenty-Two Shrines, Middle Seven;
Kifune Shrine.	Sakyō-ku, Kyoto	Myojin Taisha	Kuraokami-no-kami, one of the Twenty-Two Shrines, Lower Eight
Kitano Tenmangū.	Kamigyō-ku, Kyoto	Kokushi genzaisha	Sugawara no Michizane , one of the Twenty-Two Shrines, Lower Eight
Umenomiya Taisha.	Ukyō-ku, Kyoto	Myojin Taisha	Sakatoke-no-kami, Ōwakako-no-kami, Satatokeko-no-kami, one of the Twenty-Two Shrines, Lower Eight;
Yoshida Shrine.	Sakyō-ku, Kyoto	Shikigeisha	Twenty-Two Shrines, Lower Eight, Take-mikazuchi-no-mitoko, Futsunushi Ame-no-Koyane, Himegami,
Akama Jingu	Shimonoseki		Emperor Antoku; n.b., raised to kanpei-taisha in 1940
Dazaifu Tenmangū.	Dazaifu, Fukuoka		Sugawara no Michizane
Hikosan Jingū.	Soeda, Fukuoka Prefecture		Amenooshihomimi Izanagi Izanami-no-Mikoto
Iinoya-gū	Hamana-ku, Hamamatsu		Munenaga-shinnō
Ikasuri Shrine	Chūō-ku, Osaka	Shikinai Taisha	ichinomiya of Settsu Province Zamagami
Ikuta Shrine	Chūō-ku, Kobe	Myojin Taisha	Wakahiru-me
Itakiso Shrine	Wakayama (city)	Myojin Taisha	Isotakeru-no-kami
Kamakura-gū	Kamakura		Morinaga-shinnō
Kanasana Shrine	Kodama District, Saitama	Myojin Taisha	Amaterasu, Susanoo-no-Mikoto
Kanegasaki-gū	Tsuruga, Fukui		Takanaga Shinnō, Tsunenaga shinnō
Kibitsu Shrine	Okayama	Myojin Taisha	Ōkibitsu-hiko-no-mikoto, son of Emperor Kōrei; ichinomiya of Bitchū Province
Kumano Nachi Taisha	Nachikatsuura	Kokushi genzaisha	Ketsumiko, Kumano Hayatama-no-kami, Kumano Fusumi-no-kami
Minase Shrine	Shimamoto, Osaka		Emperor Go-Toba, Emperor Tsuchimikado and Emperor Juntoku; n.b., raised to kanpei-taisha in 1940
Mikami Shrine	Yasu, Shiga	Myojin Taisha	Ame-no-mikage-no-mikoto
Nagata Shrine.	Nagata-ku, Kobe	Myojin Taisha	Kotohshironushi-no-mikoto
Shiramine Jingū	Kamigyō-ku, Kyoto		Emperor Junnin; n.b., raised to kanpei-taisha in 1940
Sumiyoshi Shrine	Shimonoseki	Myojin Taisha	Sumiyoshi sanjin, the aramitama of the Sun Goddess, Tsuki-sasaki-itsu no mitama-amasakaru-muka-tsu-hime-no- mitoko; ichinomiya of Nagato Province
Yatsushiro-gū	Yatsushiro, Kumamoto		Prince Kaneyoshi
Watatsumi Shrine.	Tarumi-ku, Kobe, Harima Province	Myojin Taisha	Watatsumi
Tainan Shrine.	Tainan, Taiwan		now extinct; Prince Kitashirakawa Yoshihisa-no-mikoto

==== Imperial shrines, 3rd rank ====
There were five shrines that were considered the lowest ranked among the Imperial shrines. They were called Kanpei-shōsha (官幣小社).

Name	Location	Category	Notes
Kamado Shrine.	Dazaifu, Fukuoka	Myojin Taisha	Tamayori-bime Emperor Ōjin Empress Jingū
Naminoue Shrine.	Naha, Okinawa		Izanami, Hayatama, Kotosaka; ichinomiya of Ryukyu Islands
Ōkunitama Shrine.	Fuchū, Tokyo		Ōkuninushi Okunitama
Shikaumi Shrine.	Higashi-ku, Fukuoka	Myojin Taisha	Uwatsutsunoo-no-mikoto, Kakatsutsunoo-no-mitoko, Sokotsutsunoo-no-mikoto,
Sumiyoshi Shrine.	Hakata-ku, Fukuoka	Myojin Taisha	Uwatsutsunoo-no-mikoto, Kakatsutsunoo-no-mitoko, Sokotsutsunoo-no-mikoto; ichinomiya of Chikuzen Province

==== Other Imperial shrines ====
After the establishment of the officially ranked Imperial shrines, another group of special shrines known as Bekkaku kanpeisha (別格官幣社) was created. These shrines were not included in the ranking system of the Imperial shrines, but were still imperial.

Name	Location	Category	Notes
Yasukuni Shrine	Chiyoda, Tokyo	Chokusaisha	Gokoku Shrines are categorized separately but considered branches of this shrine
Abeno Shrine	Abeno-ku, Osaka		
Fujishima Shrine	Fukui (city)		
Fukui Shrine	Fukui (city)		
Goō Shrine	Kamigyō-ku, Kyoto		
Karasawayama Shrine	Sano, Tochigi		
Kenkun Shrine	Kita-ku, Kyoto		
Kikuchi Shrine	Kikuchi, Kumamoto		
Kitabatake Shrine	Tsu, Mie		
Komikado Shrine	Narita, Chiba		
Kunōzan Tōshō-gū	Suruga-ku, Shizuoka		
Minatogawa Shrine	Chūō-ku, Kobe		
Nashinoki Shrine	Kamigyō-ku, Kyoto		
Nawa Shrine	Daisen, Tottori		
Nikkō Tōshō-gū	Nikkō		
Oyama Shrine	Kanazawa		
Ryōzen Shrine	Date, Fukushima		
Saga Shrine	Saga (city)		
Shijōnawate Shrine	Shijōnawate		
Tanzan Shrine	Sakurai, Nara		
Toyokuni Shrine (Kyoto)	Higashiyama-ku, Kyoto		
Toyosaka Shrine	Yamaguchi (city)		
Noda Shrine	Yamaguchi (city)		
Terukuni shrine	Kagoshima		
Tokiwa shrine	Mito, Ibaraki		
Uesugi Shrine	Yonezawa, Yamagata		
Yamauchi Shrine	Kōchi, Kōchi		
Yūki Shrine	Tsu, Mie		

=== Kokuhei-sha ===
The Kokuhei-sha (国幣社) identified the hierarchy of government-supported shrines with national significance. The kokuheisha enshrined kami considered beneficial to more local areas.

==== National shrines, 1st rank ====
The most highly ranked, nationally significant shrines or Kokuhei Taisha (国幣大社) were six sanctuaries.

Name	Location	Category	Notes
Keta Taisha	Hakui, Ishikawa	Myojin Taisha	ichinomiya of Noto Province Ōkuninushi
Kōra taisha	Kurume, Fukuoka	Myojin Taisha	ichinomiya of Chikugo Province Hachiman
Kumano Taisha	Matsue, Shimane	Myojin Taisha	ichinomiya of Izumo Province Sumiyoshi sanjin
Nangū Taisha	Tarui, Gifu	Myojin Taisha	ichinomiya of Mino Province
Ōyamazumi Shrine	Imabari, Ehime	Myojin Taisha	ichinomiya of Iyo Province Ōyamatsumi
Tado Taisha	Kuwana, Mie	Myojin Taisha	Ninomiya, Amatsuhikone

==== National shrines, 2nd rank ====
The mid-range of ranked, nationally significant shrines or Kokuhei Chūsha (国幣中社) encompassed 47 sanctuaries.

Name	Location	Category	Notes
Aekuni Shrine	Ueno, Iga		ichinomiya of Iga Province
Ani Shrine	Okayama, Okayama	Myojin Taisha	ichinomiya of Bizen Province
Chōkaisan Ōmonoimi Shrine	Yuza, Yamagata	Myojin Taisha	ichinomiya of Dewa Province;
Chinzei Taisha Suwa Shrine	Nagasaki, Nagasaki		
Hakodate Hachiman Shrine	Hakodate, Hokkaidō		
Hayatani Shrine	Hatsukaichi, Hiroshima		Ninomiya
Ichinomiya Nukisaki Shrine	Tomioka, Gunma	Myojin Taisha	ichinomiya of Kōzuke Province
Isasumi Shrine	Aizumisato, Fukushima	Myojin Taisha	ichinomiya of Iwashiro Province
Ichinomiya Asama Shrine	Fuefuki, Yamanashi	Myojin Taisha	ichinomiya of Kai Province
Ikushimatarushima Shrine	Ueda, Nagano	Myojin Taisha	
Imizu Shrine	Takaoka, Toyama	Myojin Taisha	ichinomiya of Etchū Province
Izumo daijingu	Kameoka, Kyoto	Myojin Taisha	ichinomiya of Tanba Province
Izushi Shrine	Toyooka, Hyōgo	Myojin Taisha	ichinomiya of Tajima Province
Iwa Shrine	Shisō, Hyōgoe	Myojin Taisha	ichinomiya of Harima Province
Isono Shrine	Saijō, Ehime	Myojin Taisha	
Inbe Shrine	Tokushima, Tokushima	Myojin Taisha	
Kaijin Shrine	Tsushima, Nagasaki	Myojin Taisha	ichinomiya of Tsushima Province;
Kono Shrine	Miyazu, Kyoto	Myojin Taisha	ichinomiya of Tango Province
Kotohira-gu	Kotohira, Kagawa		
Masumida Shrine	Ichinomiya, Aichi	Myojin Taisha	ichinomiya of Owari Province
Mizuwakasu Shrine	Okinoshima, Shimane	Myojin Taisha	ichinomiya of Oki Province
Miho Shrine	Matsue, Shimane		
Nakayama Shrine	Tsuyama, Okayama	Myojin Taisha	ichinomiya of Mimasaka Province
Nikkō Futarasan Shrine	Nikkō, Tochigi	Myojin Taisha	ichinomiya of Shimotsuke Province
Nitta Shrine	Satsumasendai, Kagoshima		ichinomiya of Satsuma Province
Ōasahiko Shrine	Naruto, Tokushima	Myojin Taisha	ichinomiya of Awa Province
Ōagata Shrine	Inuyama, Aichi	Myojin Taisha	Ninomiya,
Oarai Isosaki Shrine	Ōarai, Ibaraki	Myojin Taisha	
Shiogama Shrine	Shiogama, Miyagi	Shikigeisha	ichinomiya of Mutsu Province
Sakatsura Isosaki Shrine	Hitachinaka, Ibaraki	Myojin Taisha	
Sumiyoshi Shrine (Iki City)	Iki, Nagasaki	Myojin Taisha	
Samukawa Shrine	Samukawa, Kanagawa	Myojin Taisha	ichinomiya of Sagami Province
Shirayamahime Shrine	Hakusan, Ishikawa		ichinomiya of Kaga Province
Sasamuta Shrine	Ōita, Ōita	Shikinai Taisha	ichinomiya of Bungo Province
Tsutsukowake Shrine	Tanagura, Fukushima	Myojin Taisha	ichinomiya of Mutsu Province
Tamanooya Shrine	Hōfu, Yamaguchi		ichinomiya of Suō Province
Tamasaki Shrine	Ichinomiya, Chiba	Myojin Taisha	ichinomiya of Kazusa Province
Tamura Shrine	Takamatsu, Kagawa	Myojin Taisha	ichinomiya of Sanuki Province
Tashima Shrine	Karatsu, Saga	Myojin Taisha	
Tosa Shrine	Kōchi, Kōchi	Shikinai Taisha	ichinomiya of Tosa Province
Tsurugaoka Hachimangū	Kamakura, Kanagawa		
Utsunomiya Futarayama Shrine	Utsunomiya, Tochigi	Myojin Taisha	ichinomiya of Shimotsuke Province
Ube Shrine	Tottori, Tottori	Myojin Taisha	ichinomiya of Inaba Province
Wakasahiko Shrine	Obama, Fukui	Myojin Taisha	ichinomiya of Wakasa Province
Yahiko Shrine	Yahiko, Niigata	Myojin Taisha	ichinomiya of Echigo Province

==== National shrines, 3rd rank ====
The lowest ranked, nationally significant shrines or Kokuhei Shōsha (国幣小社) includes 50 sanctuaries.

Name	Location	Category	Notes
Chichibu Shrine	Chichibu, Saitama		Shinomiya
Chiriku Hachiman Shrine	Miyaki, Saga		ichinomiya of Buzen Province
Dewa Shrine	Tsuruoka, Yamagata		one of the Three Mountains of Dewa
Fujisaki-hachimangu	Kumamoto, Kumamoto		
Hakone Shrine	Hakone, Kanagawa		
Hinomisaki Shrine	Izumo, Shimane		
Hirasaki Shrine	Ibusuki, Kagoshima		ichinomiya of Satsuma Province
Hotaka Shrine	Azumino, Nagano	Myojin Taisha	
Iminomiya Shrine	Shimonoseki, Yamaguchi		
Inaba Shrine	Gifu, Gifu		
Iwakiyama Shrine	Hirosaki, Aomori		ichinomiya of Mutsu Province
Izusan Shrine	Atami, Shizuoka		
Kibitsuhiko Shrine	Okayama, Okayama	Myojin Taisha	ichinomiya of Bizen Province
Kibitsu Shrine	Fukuyama, Hiroshima		ichinomiya of Bingo Province
Koshiō Shrine	Akita, Akita	Kokushi genzaisha	
Komagata Shrine	Ōshū, Iwate		ichinomiya of Rikuchū Province
Minashi Shrine	Takayama, Gifu		ichinomiya of Hida Province
Mononobe Shrine	Ōda, Shimane		ichinomiya of Iwami Province
Nunakuma Shrine	Fukuyama, Hiroshima		
Ōgamiyama Shrine	Yonago, Tottori		
Oguni shrine	Mori, Shizuoka		ichinomiya of Tōtōmi Province
Owari Ōkunitama Shrine	Inazawa, Aichi		
Oyama Shrine	Tateyama, Toyama		ichinomiya of Etchū Province
Sada Shrine	Matsue, Shimane		
Shitori Shrine	Yurihama, Tottori		ichinomiya of Hōki Province
Shizuoka Sengen Shrine	Aoi-ku, Shizuoka		
Susa Shrine	Izumo, Shimane		
Sugo Ishibe Shrine	Kaga, Ishikawa		Ninomiya
Tsushima Shrine	Tsushima, Aichi		
Tsurugi Shrine	Echizen, Fukui		Ninomiya
Togakushi Shrine	Nagano, Nagano		
Takase Shrine	Nanto, Toyama		ichinomiya of Etchū Province
Toga Shrine	Toyokawa, Aichi		ichinomiya of Mikawa Province
Tsuno Shrine	Tsuno, Miyazaki		ichinomiya of Hyūga Province
Watatsu Shrine	Sado, Niigata		ichinomiya of Sado Province
Yudonosan Shrine	Tsuruoka, Yamagata		one of the Three Mountains of Dewa
Yusuhara Hachimangū	Oita, Oita		ichinomiya of Bungo Province
Heijō Shrine	Pyongyang, Korea		extinct
Kagi Shrine	Chiayi, Taiwan		extinct
Kankō Shrine	Hamhung, Korea		extinct
Keijō Shrine	Seoul, Korea		extinct
Kōshū Shrine	Gwangju, Korea		extinct
Kōgen Shrine	Chuncheon, Korea		extinct
Ryūtōsan Shrine	Busan, Korea		extinct
Shinchiku Shrine	Hsinchu, Taiwan		extinct
Taichu Shrine	Taichung, Taiwan		extinct
Taikyu Shrine	Daegu, Korea		extinct
Zenshū Shrine	Jeonju, Korea		extinct

== Gokoku shrines ==
Gokoku shrines were ranked separately. (Note: Miyazaki Gokoku Shrine and Kumamoto Gokoku Shrine were completed after World War II, when the war ended and the Ministry of Home Affairs was abolished, so they were not designated by the Minister of Home Affairs and are actually correctly designated as "equivalent to designated Gokoku-jinja Shrine".) They were considered branches of Yasukuni Shrine.

name	Location	Beppyo	Notes
Yasukuni Shrine	Tokyo	formerly	Traditional head shrine. Also ranked as a Bekkaku Kanpeisha
Miyagi Gokoku Shrine	Sendai, Miyagi	yes	
Akita Prefecture Gokoku Shrine	Akita	yes	
Yamagata Prefecture Gokoku Shrine	Yamagata	yes	
Fukushima Gokoku Shrine	Fukushima	yes	
Ibaraki Prefectural Gokoku Shrine	Mito, Ibaraki	yes	
Gunma Gokoku Shrine	Takasaki	yes	
Chiba Gokoku Shrine	Chūō-ku, Chiba	yes	
Niigata Gokoku Shrine	Chūō-ku, Niigata	yes	
Toyama Gokoku Shrine	Toyama	yes	
Ishikawa Gokoku Shrine	Kanazawa	yes	
Fukui Gokoku Shrine	Fukui	yes	
Yamanashi Gokoku Shrine	Kōfu	yes	
Nagano Gokoku Shrine	Matsumoto, Nagano	yes	
Gifu Gokoku Shrine	Gifu	yes	
Shizuokaken Gokoku Shrine	Aoi-ku, Shizuoka	yes	
Aichi Gokoku Shrine	Naka-ku, Nagoya	yes	
Mie Prefecture Gokoku Shrine	Tsu, Mie	yes	
Shiga Prefecture Gokoku Shrine	Hikone, Shiga	yes	
Kyoto Ryozen Gokoku Shrine	Higashiyama-ku, Kyoto	yes	
Osaka Gokoku Shrine	Suminoe-ku, Osaka	yes	
Hyogo Himeji Gokoku Shrine	Himeji	yes	
Hyogo Prefecture Kobe Gokoku Shrine	Nada-ku, Kobe	yes	
Nara Gokoku Shrine	Nara	yes	
Matsue Gokoku Shrine	Matsue	yes	
Hamada Gokoku Shrine	Hamada, Shimane	yes	
Okayama Gokoku Shrine	Naka-ku, Okayama	yes	
Bingo Gokoku Shrine	Fukuyama, Hiroshima	yes	
Hiroshima Gokoku Shrine	Naka-ku, Hiroshima	yes	
Yamaguchi Prefecture Gokoku Shrine	Yamaguchi	yes	
Tokushima Gokoku Shrine	Tokushima	yes	
Ehime Prefecture Gokoku Shrine	Matsuyama	yes	
Kochi Gokoku Shrine	Kōchi, Kōchi	yes	
Fukuoka Prefecture Gokoku Shrine	Chūō-ku, Fukuoka	yes	
Saga Gokoku Shrine	Saga	yes	
Nagasaki Gokoku Shrine	Nagasaki	yes	
Oita Gokoku Shrine	Ōita	yes	
Kagoshima Prefecture Gokoku Shrine	Kagoshima	yes	
Miyazaki Gokoku Shrine	Miyazaki	yes	Not a proper Gokoku Shrine but listed as equivalent due to having been finished after the war
Kumamoto Gokoku Shrine	Kumamoto	yes	Not a proper Gokoku Shrine but listed as equivalent due to having been finished after the war
Okinawa Gokoku Shrine	Okinawa Prefecture	no	
Hida Gokoku Shrine	Takayama, Gifu	no	
Aomori Gokoku Shrine	Aomori	no	
Wakayama Gokoku Shrine	Wakayama	no	
Meguro Gokoku Shrine	Meguro	no	
Iki Gokoku Shrine	Iki, Nagasaki	no	
Kagawa Gokoku Shrine	Zentsūji, Kagawa	no	
Kawanami Gokoku Shrine	Kawaminami, Miyazaki	no	
Saitama Gokoku Shrine	Saitama	no	
Sapporo Gokoku Shrine	Sapporo	no	
Tanao Gokoku Shrine	Hekinan	no	
Tochigi Gokoku Shrine	Tochigi	no	
Nōhi Gokoku Shrine	Ōgaki	no	
Hakodate Gokoku Shrine	Hakodate	no	
Matsumae Gokoku Shrine	Matsumae, Hokkaido	no	
Taiwan Gokoku Shrine	Taiwan	no	

== "Min-sha" ==
The Sho-sha (諸社) or various smaller shrines ranking below these two levels of Kan-sha ("official government shrines") are commonly, though unofficially, referred to as "people's shrines" or Min-sha (民社). These lower-ranking shrines were initially subdivided by the proclamation of the fourteenth day of the fifth month of 1871 into four main ranks, "Metropolitan", "Clan" or "Domain", "Prefectural", and "District" shrines. By far the largest number of shrines fell below the rank of District shrine. Their status was clarified by the District Shrine Law (郷社定則, Gōsha Teisoku) of the fourth day of the seventh month of 1871, in accordance with which "Village shrines" ranked below their respective "District shrines", while the smaller local shrines or Hokora ranked beneath the "Village shrines".

Here is a non-exhaustive list of shrines under each categorization. This list only includes ones now listed as Beppyo shrines unless otherwise specified.

=== Metropolitan and Prefectural Shrines ===
"Metropolitan shrines" were known as Fu-sha (府社). "Prefectural shrines" were known as Ken-sha (県社). At a later date, the "Prefectural shrines" were classed together with the "Metropolitan shrines" as "Metropolitan and Prefectural Shrines" or Fuken-sha (府県社).

Name	Location	Category	Notes
Metropolitan Shrine (府社)
Nogi Shrine (Tokyo)	Minato, Tokyo	－	
Kanda Shrine	Chiyoda, Tokyo		
Tōgō Shrine	Tokyo Shibuya	－	
Ōmiya Hachiman Shrine (Tokyo)	Suginami	－	
Yushima Tenmangū	Bunkyō		
Atago Shrine (Kyoto)	Kyoto, Kyoto Prefecture Ukyō-ku, Kyoto	Shikinai Shosha	
Osaka Tenmangū	Kita-ku, Osaka		
Kōzu-gū	Chuo Ward, Osaka City, Osaka Prefecture		
Prefectural Shrine (県社)
Sumiyoshi Shrine	Otaru		
Kamikawa Shrine	Asahikawa		
Obihiro Shrine	Obihiro		
Tarumaezan Shrine	Tomakomai		
Saruka Shrine	Hirakawa, Aomori		
Shiwa Inari Shrine	Shiwa District, Iwate Shiwa, Iwate	－	
Morioka Hachimangū	Morioka	－	
Kinkasan Shrine	Ishinomaki	Shōsha Ronsha (小社論社)	
Takekoma Inari Shrine	Iwanuma		
Taiheiyama Miyoshi Shrine	Akita (city)		
Akita Suwa Shrine	Senboku District, Akita Misato, Akita		
Kinpō Shrine	Tsuruoka		
Kumano Shrine	Nan'yō, Yamagata		
Ayukai Hachimangu	Nishiokitama District, Yamagata Shirataka	－	
Yachi Hachimangu	Nishimurayama District, Yamagata Kahoku, Yamagata	－	
Chōkai gassan ryōsho-gu	Yamagata	－	
Sagae Hachimangu	Sagae	－	
Tsukubasan Shrine	Tsukuba	Myojin Taisha (名神)・Shikinai Shosha	
Mito Tōshō-gū	Mito, Ibaraki	－	
Mitsumine Shrine	Chichibu, Saitama		
Hodosan Shrine	Nagatoro, Saitama		
Yakyu Inari Shrine	Higashimatsuyama, Saitama		
Hikawa Shrine (Kawagoe)	Kawagoe, Saitama		
Washinomiya Shrine	Kuki, Saitama		
Koma Shrine	Hidaka, Saitama		
Enoshima Shrine	Fujisawa, Kanagawa		
Iseyama Kotaijingu	Yokohama	－	
Hiratsuka Hachimangu	Hiratsuka		
Hōtoku Ninomiya Shrine	Odawara	－	
Oyama Aburi Shrine	Isehara, Kanagawa	Shikinai Shosha	
Hakusan Shrine	Niigata (city) Chūō-ku, Niigata	Shōsha Ronsha (小社論社)	
Hie Shrine (Toyama)	Toyama city	－	
Onominato Shrine	Kanazawa	Shikinai Shosha	
Shinmei Shrine	Fukui (city)		
Kitaguchi Hongu Fuji Asama Shrine	Fujiyoshida		
Fuji Omuro Asama Shrine	Minamitsuru District, Yamanashi Fujikawaguchiko		
Takeda Shrine	Kōfu	－	
Fukashi Shrine	Matsumoto, Nagano		
Tenaga Shrine	Suwa, Nagano		
Takemizuwake Shrine	Chikuma, Nagano	Myojin Taisha (名神)	
Nyakuichi Ouji Shrine	Ōmachi, Nagano		
Sakurayama Hachimangu	Takayama, Gifu		
Akihasan Hongū Akiha Shrine	Tenryū Ward		
Shirahama Shrine	Shimoda, Shizuoka	Myojin Taisha (名神)	
Yaizu Shrine	Yaizu		
Oi Shrine	Shimada, Shizuoka		
Gosha Suwa Shrine	Chūō-ku, Hamamatsu		
Wakamiya Hachiman Shrine	Naka Ward, Nagoya City		
Chiryu Shrine	Chiryū	Shikinai Shosha	
Tsubaki Grand Shrine	Suzuka, Mie	Shōsha Ronsha (小社論社)	
Himure Hachiman-gū	Ōmihachiman		
Nagahama Hachimangu	Nagahama, Shiga		
Nishinomiya Shrine	Nishinomiya		
Itatehyōzu Shrine	Himeji	Shikinai Shosha	
Hiromine Shrine	Himeji	Kokushi genzaisha (国史)	
Oishi Shrine	Akō, Hyōgo	－	
Tada Shrine	Kawanishi, Hyōgo	－	
Isonozatakumushitama Shrine	Yamatotakada, Nara	Taisha (大社)	
Tokei Shrine	Tanabe, Wakayama		
Hirahama Hachimangu	Matsue		
Yaegaki Shrine	Matsue	Shikinai Shosha	
Fukuyama Hachimangū	Fukuyama, Hiroshima		
Kameyama Shrine	Kure, Hiroshima		
Hōfu Tenmangū	Hōfu		
Kotozaki Hachimangu	Ube, Yamaguchi		
Kameyama Hachimangū	Shimonoseki		
Ishizuchi Shrine	Saijō, Ehime		
Warei Shrine	Uwajima, Ehime		
Iyozu Hikomei Shrine	Matsuyama	Myojin Taisha (名神)	
Ushioe Tenmangu shrine	Kōchi (city)		
Miyajidake Shrine	Fukutsu, Fukuoka		
Kurume Suitengū	Kurume City		
Kushida Shrine	Hakata-ku, Fukuoka		
Furogu Shrine	Ōkawa, Fukuoka		
Tobata Hachimangu	Kitakyushu Tobata-ku, Kitakyūshū		
Kosou Hachimangu	Moji-ku, Kitakyūshū		
Umi Hachiman-gū	Kasuya District, Fukuoka Umi, Fukuoka		
Otomi Shrine	Buzen, Fukuoka		
Terumo Shrine	Chūō-ku, Fukuoka		
Noso Hachimangu	Iizuka, Fukuoka		
Yūtoku Inari Shrine	Kashima, Saga	－	
Kameyama Hachimangu Shrine	Sasebo		
Aoi Aso Shrine	Hitoyoshi, Kumamoto		
Hachiman Asami Shrine	Beppu		
Kasuga Shrine	Ōita (city)		
Kanhashira-gū	Miyakonojō		
Sano Shrine	Nishimorokata District, Miyazaki Takaharu, Miyazaki		
Susaki Shrine			Awa Province Ichinomiya, Not a Beppyo shrine
Rokusho Shrine			Soja Shrine, Not a Beppyo shrine
Take Shrine	Fuchu, Aki District, Hiroshima	Myojin Taisha (名神)	Not a Beppyo shrine
Unknown
Tsubaki-Nakato Shrine	Suzuka, Mie Prefecture		Ise Province Ichinomiya, Not a Beppyo shrine
Kotonomama Hachiman-gū	Kakegawa, Shizuoka Prefecture		Tōtōmi Province Ichinomiya, Not a Beppyo shrine
Keta Jinja	Takaoka, Toyama Prefecture		ichinomiya of former Etchū Province, Not a Beppyo shrine
Kota Shrine	Jōetsu, Niigata Prefecture		ichinomiya of former Echigo Province, Not a Beppyo shrine
Amatsu Shrine	Itoigawa, Niigata		ichinomiya of former Echigo Province, Not a Beppyo shrine
Awaga-jinja	Asago in Hyōgo Prefecture		ichinomiya of former Tajima Province, Not a Beppyo shrine
Ichinomiya Shrine	Tokushima in Tokushima Prefecture, Japan		ichinomiya of former Awa Province, Not a Beppyo shrine
Yodohime Shrine	Saga, Saga Prefecture		Hizen Province ichinomiya, Not a Beppyo shrine
Adachi Myokengu	Kitakyushu, Fukuoka Prefecture, Japan		Not a Beppyo shrine
Awata Shrine	Kyoto, Japan		Not a Beppyo shrine
Izumi Inoue Shrine	Izumi Province, Japan		Not a Beppyo shrine
Kitaoka Shrine	Higo Province, Japan		Not a Beppyo shrine
Mizokui Shrine	Ibaraki, Osaka Prefecture, Japan		Not a Beppyo shrine
Nanba Shrine	Osaka		Not a Beppyo shrine
Nitta Shrine (Ōta)			Not a Beppyo shrine
Suga Shrine	Unnan, Shimane Prefecture, Japan		Not a Beppyo shrine
Sakurai Shrine (Sakai)	Sakai, Osaka Prefecture, Japan		Not a Beppyo shrine
Onji Shrine	Osaka Prefecture, Japan	Myojin Taisha	Not a Beppyo shrine
Suda Hachiman Shrine	Hashimoto, Wakayama Prefecture, Japan		Not a Beppyo shrine
Hyōzu Shrine	Nishiwaki, Hyōgo Prefecture, Japan		Not a Beppyo shrine
Konda Hachimangu	Habikino		Not a Beppyo shrine
Fujishiro-ōji	Kainan City, Wakayama Prefecture, Japan		Not a Beppyo shrine
Ikoma Shrine	Ikoma, Nara		Not a Beppyo shrine
Yamato Okunitama Shrine	Minamiawaji, Hyōgo Prefecture		Not a Beppyo shrine, Yamato Okunitama, Awaji Province Ninomiya
Koxinga Shrine	Tainan, Taiwan		Was proposed to be the highest shrine in Taiwan

=== Clan or Domain shrines ===
"Clan shrines" or "Domain shrines" were known as Han-sha (藩社). Due to the abolition of the han system, no shrines were ever placed in this category.

=== District shrine ===
"District shrines" were known as Gō-sha (郷社).

Name	Location	Category	Notes
Hokutan Shrine	Shōnai, Yamagata	－	
Osugi Shrine	Inashiki, Ibaraki		
Igusa Hachimangu	Suginami, Tokyo	－	
Inage Shrine	Kawasaki, Kanagawa		
Fuji Yamashitamiya Komuro Asama Shrine	Fujiyoshida, Yamanashi		
Fuji Rokusho Sengen Shrine	Fuji, Shizuoka	Shikinai Shosha	
Imamiya Ebisu Shrine	Naniwa-ku, Osaka		
Taikodani Inari Shrine	Kanoashi District, Shimane Tsuwano, Shimane		
Tsunomine Shrine	Anan, Tokushima		
Washio Atago Shrine	Nishi-ku, Fukuoka		
Tagata Shrine	Komaki, Aichi		Not a Beppyo shrine
Yatsurugi Shrine			Not a Beppyo shrine
Ono Shrine	Tama, Tokyo		Not a Beppyo shrine Musashi Province Ichinomiya
Ebetsu shrine	Ebetsu, Hokkaidō		Not a Beppyo shrine
Hokumon Shrine	Wakkanai, Hokkaidō		Not a Beppyo shrine
Kushihiki Hachimangū	Hachinohe, Aomori		Not a Beppyo shrine
Ōsasahara Shrine	Yasu, Shiga		Not a Beppyo shrine
Shirahigetawara Shrine	Kitsuki, Ōita		Not a Beppyo shrine
Torigoe Hachiman Shrine	Shinjō, Yamagata		Not a Beppyo shrine
Tosa Kokubun-ji	Nankoku, Kōchi		Not a Beppyo shrine
Katano Shrine			Not a Beppyo shrine
Namba Yasaka Shrine			Not a Beppyo shrine
Yagi Shrine	Kishiwada, Osaka		Not a Beppyo shrine

=== Village shrines ===
"Village shrines" were known as Son-sha (村社) and ranked below their respective "District shrines", in accordance with the District Shrine Law of 4 July 1871.

Name	Location	Category	Notes
Ōsaki Hachimangū	Sendai Aoba-ku, Sendai		
Kasama Inari Shrine	Kasama, Ibaraki		
Yohashira Shrine	Matsumoto, Nagano	－	
Kinomiya Shrine	Atami		
Futami Okitama Shrine	Ise, Mie		
Aga Shrine	Higashiōmi		
Hijiyama Shrine	Hiroshima Minami-ku, Hiroshima		
Wakamatsu Ebisu Shrine	Wakamatsu-ku, Kitakyūshū		
Aoshima Shrine	Miyazaki (city)		
Takachiho Shrine	Nishiusuki District, Miyazaki Takachiho, Miyazaki	Kokushi genzaisha (国史)	
Amanoiwato Shrine	Takachiho Town, Nishiusuki District		
Amanotanagao Shrine	Iki, Nagasaki	Myojin Taisha (名神)	Iki Province Ichinomiya, not a Beppyo shrine
Araki Shrine	Okinoshima, Shimane		Sōja shrine, not a Beppyo shrine
Hinumanai Shrine	Kyōtango, Kyoto Prefecture		not a Beppyo shrine
Ichinomiya Sengen Shrine	Ichikawamisato, Nishiyatsushiro District in Yamanashi Prefecture	Myojin Taisha (名神)	Kai Province Ichinomiya, not a Beppyo shrine
Kamochi Shrine	Hino, Tottori Prefecture		not a Beppyo shrine
Nagakusa Tenjin Shrine	Aichi Prefecture, Obu City		not a Beppyo shrine
Togakushi Shrine			not a Beppyo shrine
Yurahime Shrine	Oki-gun, Shimane	Myojin Taisha (名神)	Oki Province Ichinomiya, not a Beppyo shrine
Kō Shrine			Iki Province Sōja shrine

=== Hokora or Ungraded shrines ===
Small local shrines known as Hokora (祠) are ranked beneath the village shrines, in accordance with the District Shrine Law of 4 July 1871. At a later date, shrines beneath the rank of "Village shrines" were classed as "Ungraded shrines" or Mukaku-sha (無格社).

Name	Location	Category	Notes
Sarutahiko Shrine	Ise, Mie		Sarutahiko Ōkami
Takahashi Inari Shrine	Kumamoto		－
Itsukushima Shrine (Kyoto)	Kyoto		Not a Beppyo shrine
Shirakumo Shrine	Kyoto		Not a Beppyo shrine
Suitengū (Tokyo)	Tokyo		Not a Beppyo shrine

== Statistics ==
New shrines were established and existing shrines promoted to higher ranks at various dates, but a 1903 snapshot of the 193,297 shrines in existence at that time saw the following:

- Kan-sha
  - Imperial shrines: 95
  - National shrines: 75
- "Min-sha"
  - Metropolitan and prefectural shrines: 571
  - District shrines: 3,476
  - Village shrines: 52,133
  - Ungraded shrines: 136,947

== See also ==
- List of Shinto shrines
- Setsumatsusha

== Sources ==
- Breen, John and Mark Teeuwen. (2000). Shinto in History: Ways of the Kami. Honolulu: University of Hawaii Press. ISBN 978-0-8248-2363-4
- Ponsonby-Fane, Richard. (1959). The Imperial House of Japan. Kyoto: Ponsonby Memorial Society. OCLC 194887
- Ponsonby-Fane, Richard. (1962). Studies in Shinto and Shrines. Kyoto: Ponsonby Memorial Society. OCLC 399449
- Ponsonby-Fane, Richard. (1963). The Viciissitudes of Shinto. Kyoto: Ponsonby Memorial Society. OCLC 186605327
