= Yusuhara Hachimangū =

Shinto shrine in Ōita, Ōita, Japan

Yusuhara Hachiman-gū 柞原八幡宮
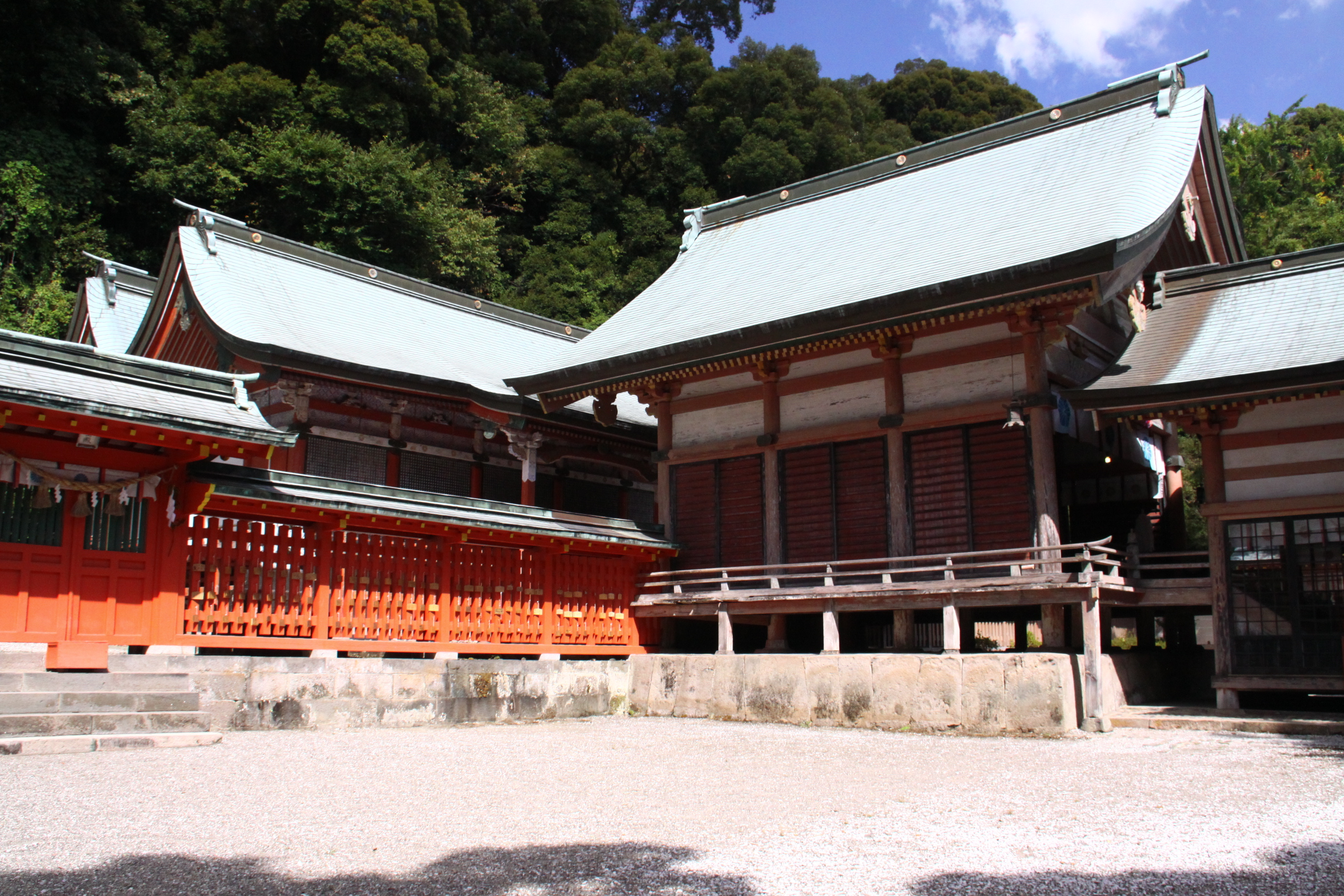
- Shaden of Yusuhara Hachiman-gū

- Location within Oita Prefecture Location within Japan

Religion
- Affiliation: Shinto
- Deity: Hachiman
- Festival: March 15

Location
- Location: 987 Yawata, Ōita-shi, Ōita-ken
- Interactive map of Yusuhara Hachiman-gū 柞原八幡宮
- Coordinates: 33°14′18.2″N 131°33′3.6″E

Architecture
- Style: Hachiman-zukuri
- Established: c.830

Website
- Official website

Yusuhara Hachiman-gū (柞原八幡宮) is a Shinto shrine located in the city of Ōita, Ōita Prefecture, Japan. It is one of two shrines claiming the title of ichinomiya of former Bungo Province, the other being the Sasamuta Jinja, also in Ōita. The shrine's main festival is held annually on March 15. It is also sometimes referred to as Yusubara Hachiman-gū (由原八幡宮).

== Enshrined kami ==
The main kami at this shrine is Hachiman (八幡), here identified as the trinity of Emperor Chūai, Emperor Ōjin and Empress Jingū.

== History ==
The foundation date of this shrine is unknown. The shrine's legend, which dates from the Kamakura period states that in the year 827, a monk of Enryaku-ji named Konki worshipped at Usa Hachiman-gū for 1000 days and received an oracle which stated that the kami Hachiman would bless Bungo Province. A mysterious white banner flew over Kakugo, Ōita and was presented to Emperor Ninmyo, who ordered the governor of Bungo Province to construct this shrine. From the year 998 onwards, it became the practice to reconstruct the shrine buildings at 33 year intervals, the same as at Usa Hachiman-gū. Despite its dispute with Sasumuta Jinja, which as an equally ancient claim to the title, it has been referred to as the "Bungo ichinomiya since the 12th century, because of the shrine's proximity to the kokufu of Bungo Province. The shrine was supported by the Ōtomo clan from the time they entered the province as shugo during the Kamakura period. In the Sengoku period, it was destroyed by Ōtomo Sōrin after his conversion to Christianity, but was rebuilt in the early Edo period and supported by the successive daimyō of Funai Domain. Following the Meiji Restoration, it was given the rank Prefectural shrine under the Modern system of ranked Shinto Shrines. In 1912, it was promoted to a National Shrine, 3rd rank (国幣小社, Kokuhei Shosha) .

== Gallery ==
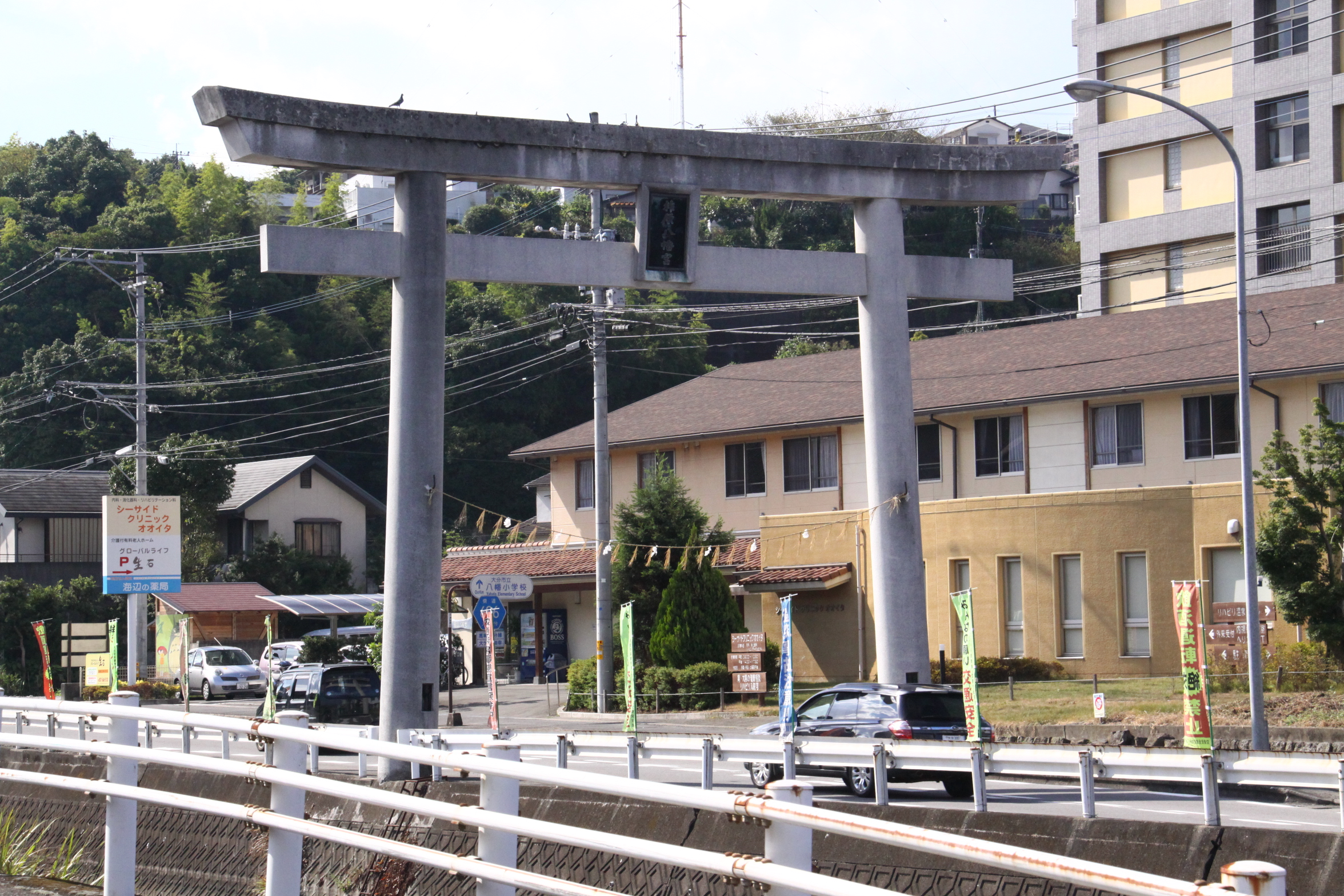
Torii Gate

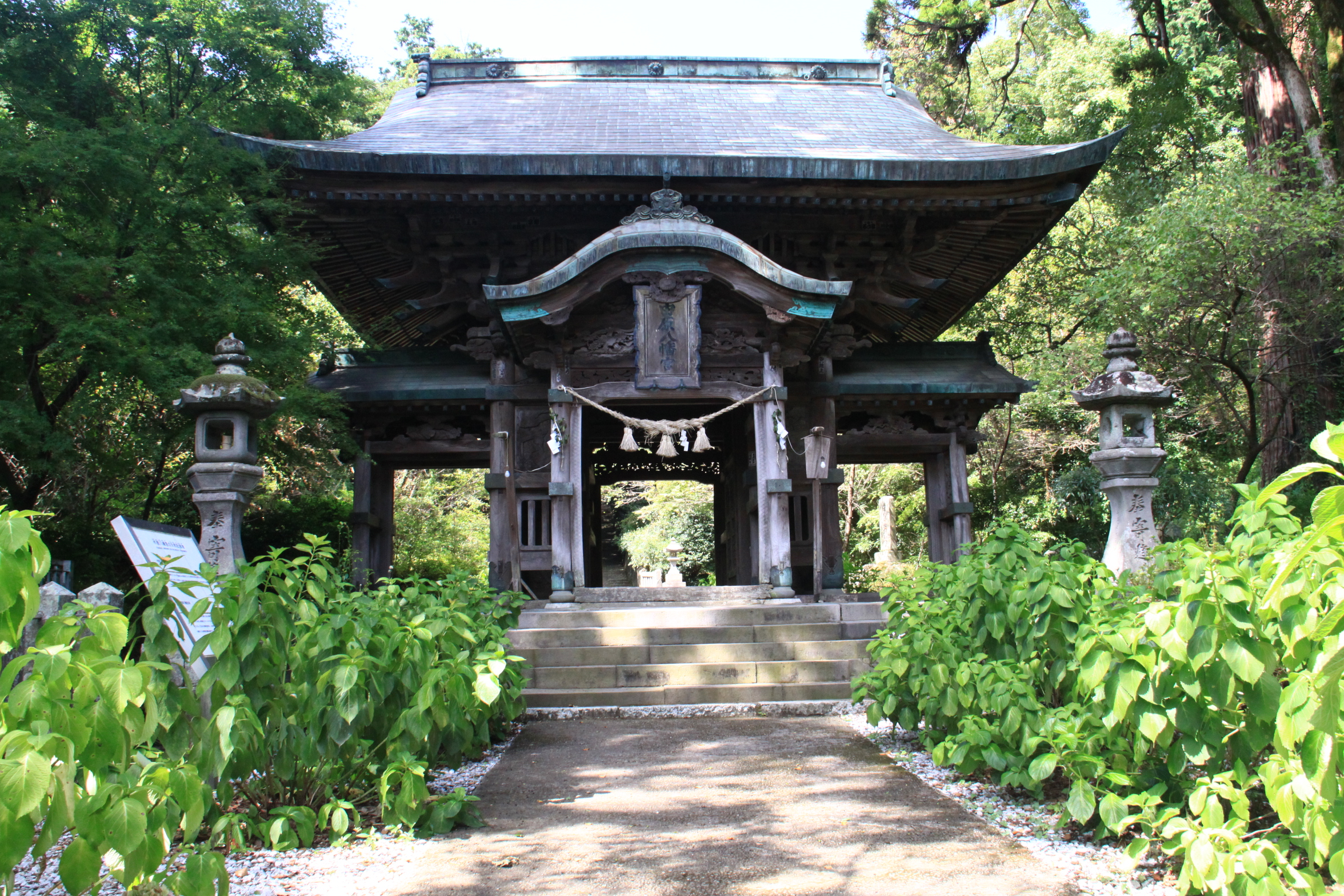
Nandaimon

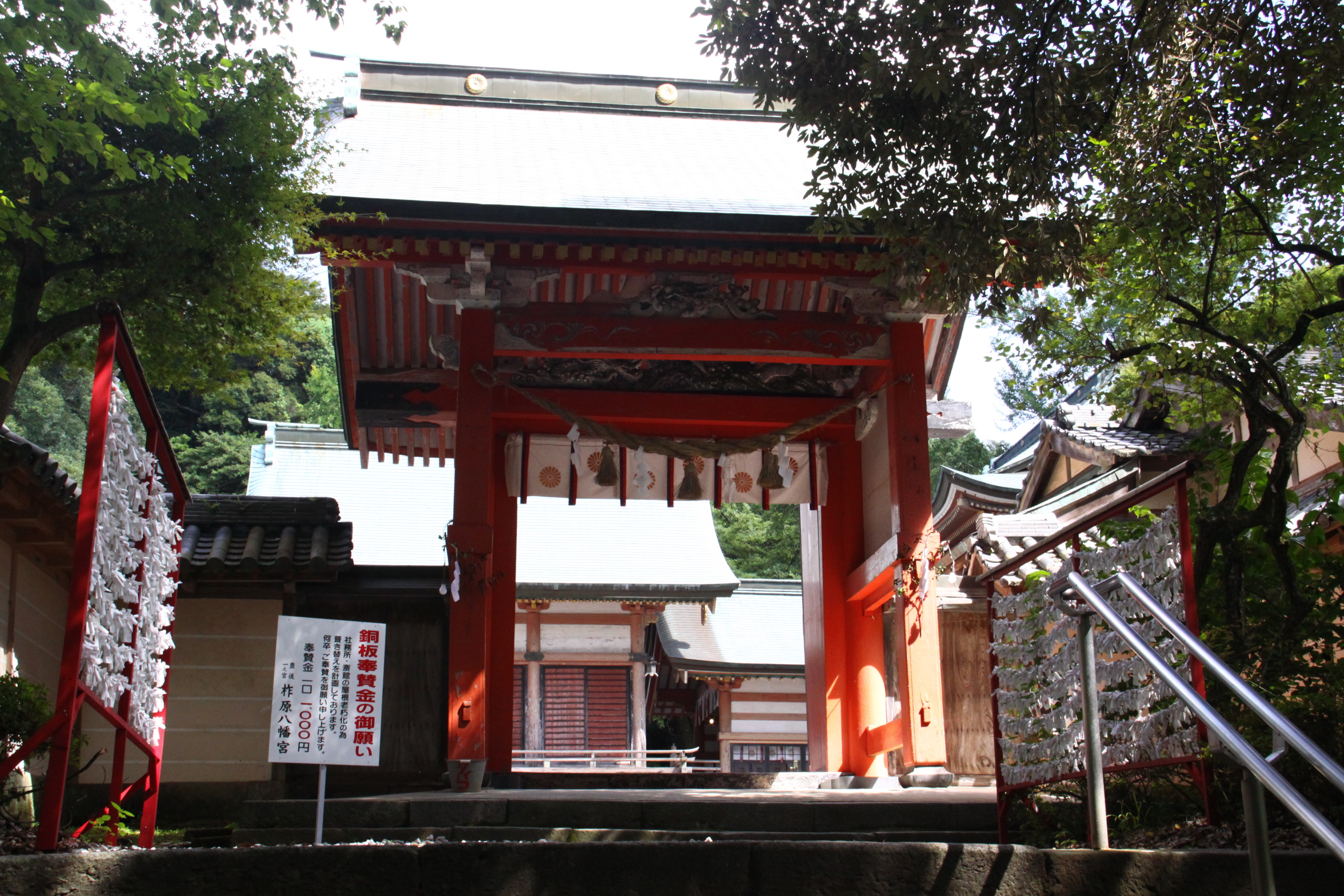
Nishimon

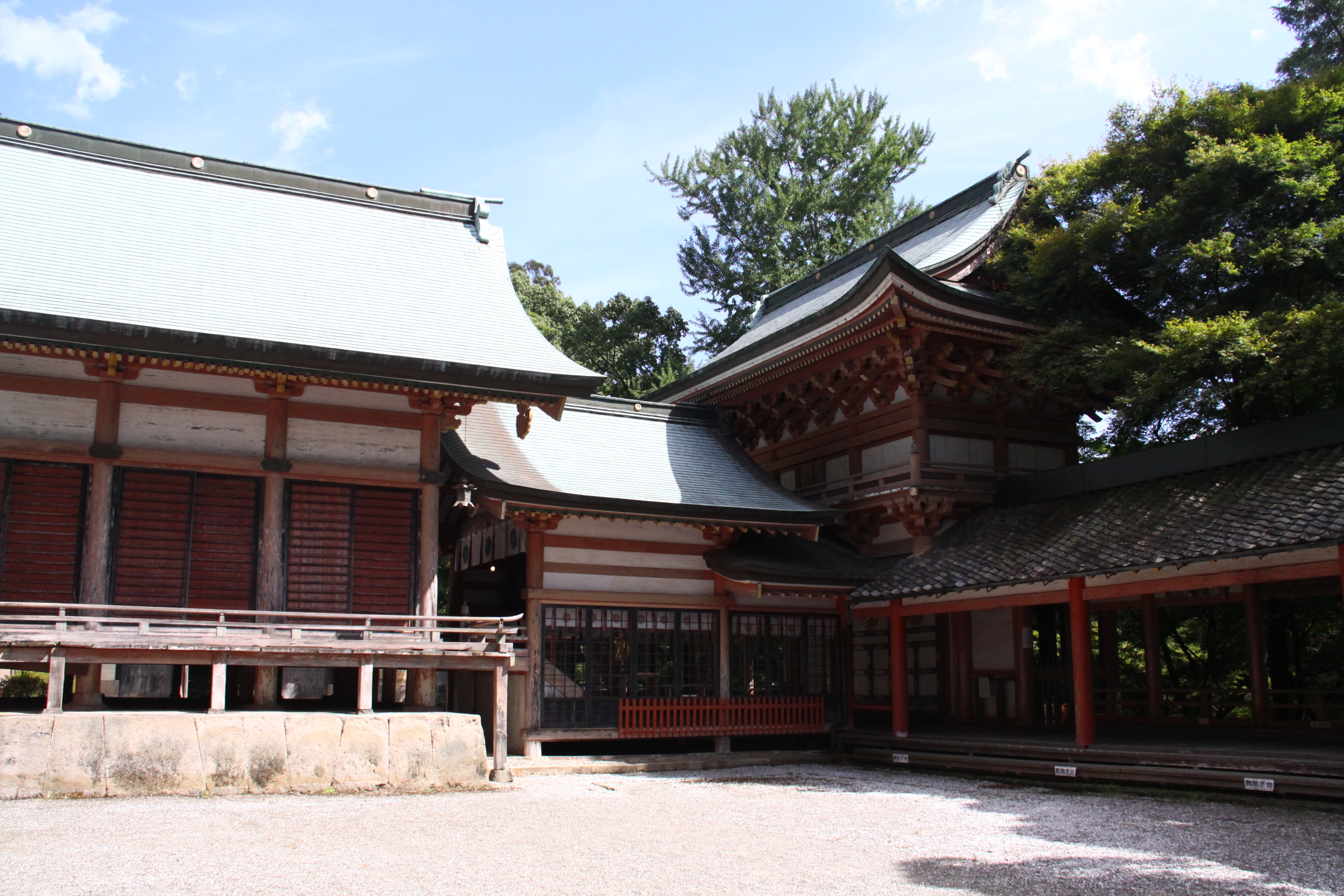
'Moshidono, Heiden, Rōmon

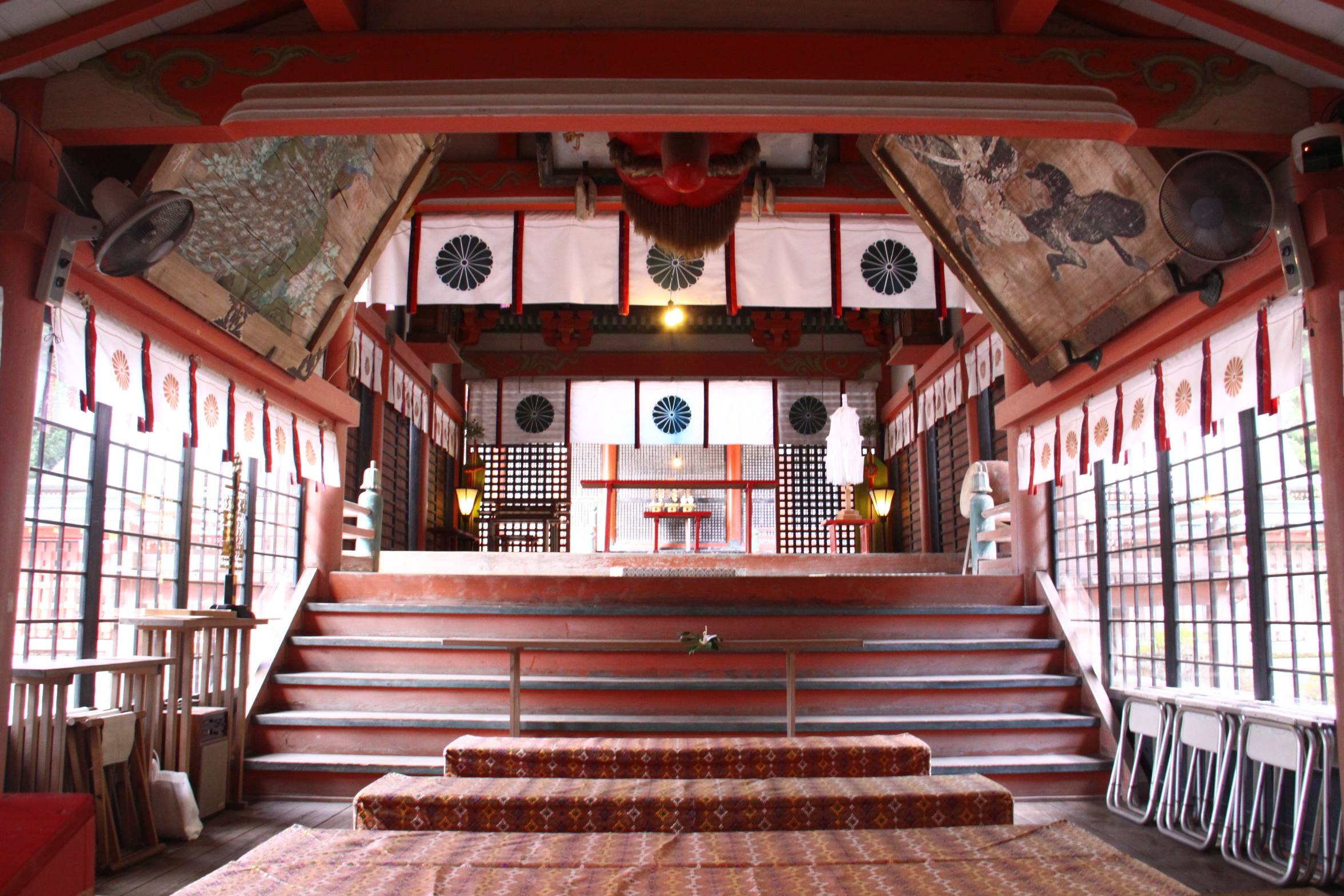
Inside the shrine buildings

== Cultural properties ==
=== Natural Monuments ===
- Camphora officinarum, National Natural Monument. Claimed to be over 3000 years old. Mentioned by Ino Tadataka in his 1811 survey of Japan

=== Important Cultural Properties ===
- Yusuhara Hachiman-gu (10 structures), Edo Period.
  - Honden, 1850
  - Mōshidono, 1752
  - Haiden, 1759
  - Rōmon, 1760
  - Tōhōden, 1757
  - Saihōden, 1757
  - East Corridor, 1798
  - West Corridor, 1798
  - West Gate, late Edo Period
  - South Great Gate, 1870, with storehouse including 4 documents: blueprints for Main Shrine and Rōmon, 2 maps of precincts)
- Tachi sword, Kamakura period, inscribed "Kunimune"
- Tachi sword, Kamakura period, inscribed "Minamoto no Kuni?"
- Halberd, Nanboku-chō period, inscribed "Kunishige" and "Hachiman Daibodhisattva Tenma Daijizai Tenjin"
- Bronze Buddha statue, Asuka period.
- Armor, complete set, Muromachi period,
- Yusuhara Hachiman-gu old documents, Heian period, 17 scrolls with 216 documents.

== See also ==
- List of Shinto shrines
- Ichinomiya
