= Izawa-jinja =

Shinto shrine in Toba, Mie, Japan

Izawa Jinja 伊射波神社
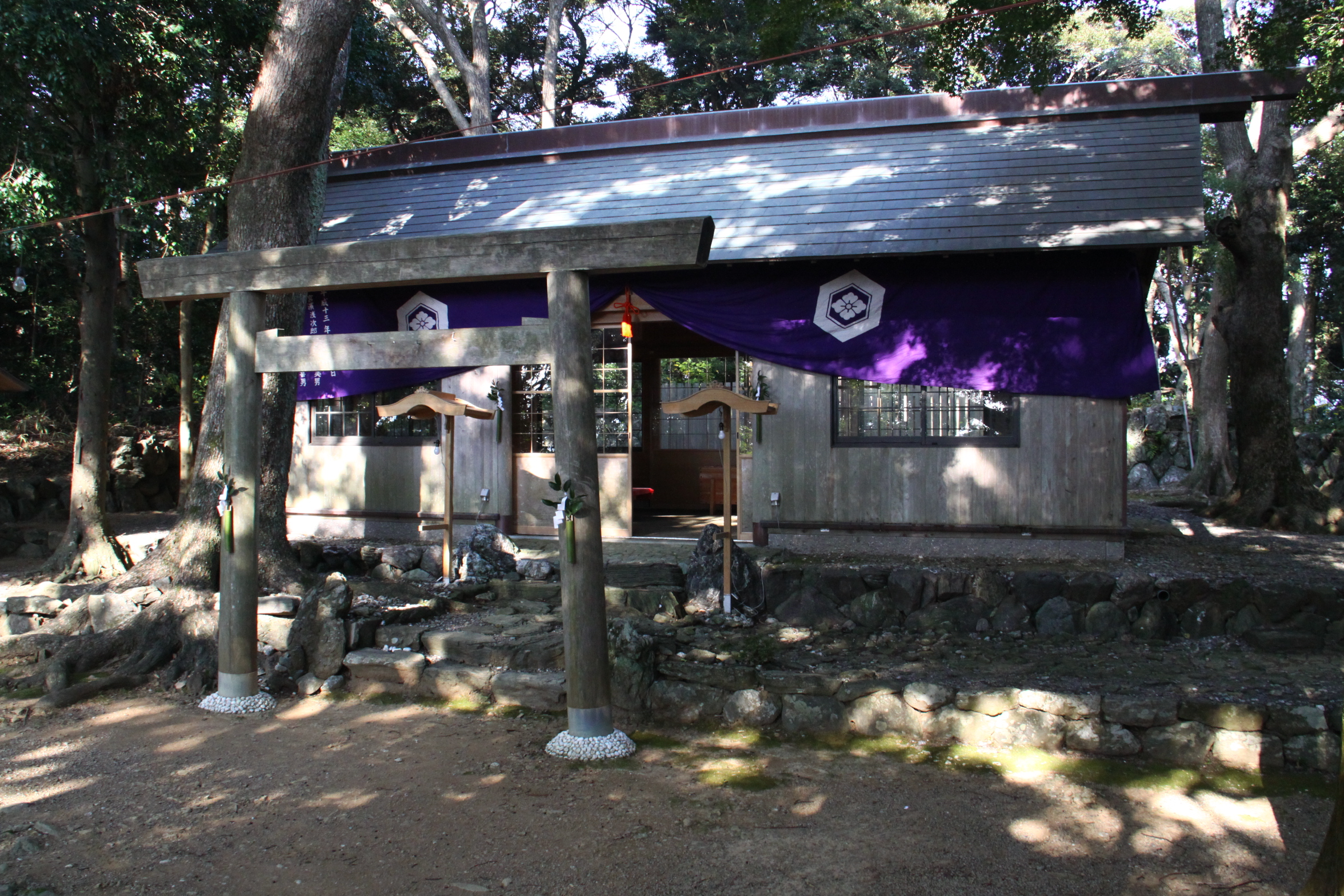
- Izawa Jinja Haiden

- Location within Mie Prefecture Location within Japan

Religion
- Affiliation: Shinto
- Deity: Wakahiru-me

Location
- Location: 1210 Arashimacho, Toba-shi, Mie-ken
- Interactive map of Izawa Jinja 伊射波神社
- Coordinates: 34°28′22.44″N 136°52′27.66″E

Architecture
- Style: Shinmei-zukuri
- Established: unknown

Izawa Jinja (伊射波神社) is a Shinto shrine in the Arashima neighborhood of the city of Toba in Mie Prefecture, Japan. It is one of the two shrines claiming the title of ichinomiya of former Shima Province. The main festivals of the shrine are held annually on January 9, June 7 and November 23. It is also referred to as the Shima Daimyōjin (志摩大明神).

== Enshrined kami ==
The kami enshrined at Izawa Jinja are:

- Wakahiru-me-no-mikoto (稚日女尊), daughter or younger sister of Amaterasu
- Izawatomi-no-mikoto (伊佐波登美命), local kami who greeted PrincessYamato when she was looking for a site for this shrine
- Tamahashiraya-hime-no-nikoto (玉柱屋姫命), ancestor of the Ise kuni no miyatsuko
- Sayori-hime-no-mikoto (狭依姫命), territorial goddess of an island offshore Shima, now submerged.

== History ==
The origins of the Izawa Jinja are unknown. The shrine claims to have a history extending over 1500 years, and was originally the maritime guardian deity of Shima Province centered on the worship of Wakahiru-me for protection of travelers on the sea route across Ise Bay which was part of the ancient route of the Tōkaidō highway to eastern Japan. The shrine appears in the Engishiki in 927 AD; however, there is controversy as to whether the shrine listed in the Engishiki (and in other ancient records), is this shrine, or if it is the rival Izawa-no-miya. The Izawa Jinja has claimed to be the ichinomiya of Shima Province from the early Kamakura period. One justification is that the shrine listed in the Wamyō Ruijushō dictionary of 938 is clearly this shrine and not the Izawa-no-miya based on the kanji used in its name and the location listed. Another is that Izawa-no-miya is not an independent shrine, but is a branch of the Ise Grand Shrine and Toba Domain in the Edo period sponsored this shrine as the ichinomiya as a rival to the Izawa-no-miya as Ise Grand Shrine was not in their territory. A counter argument is that by definition, the ichinomiya of a province much be located in close proximity to its provincial capital, and Izawa-no-miya fits this description better than Izawa Jinja. In any event, the shrine was destroyed and rebuilt several times in its history, especially during the Sengoku period and it was also once destroyed by a tsunami in the 1854 Tōkai earthquake, and all of its records were lost.

During the Meiji period era of State Shinto, the shrine was not given a rank under the Modern system of ranked Shinto Shrines.

The shrine is located a five-minute walk from Kaminogō Station on the Kintetsu Shima Line.

== Gallery ==
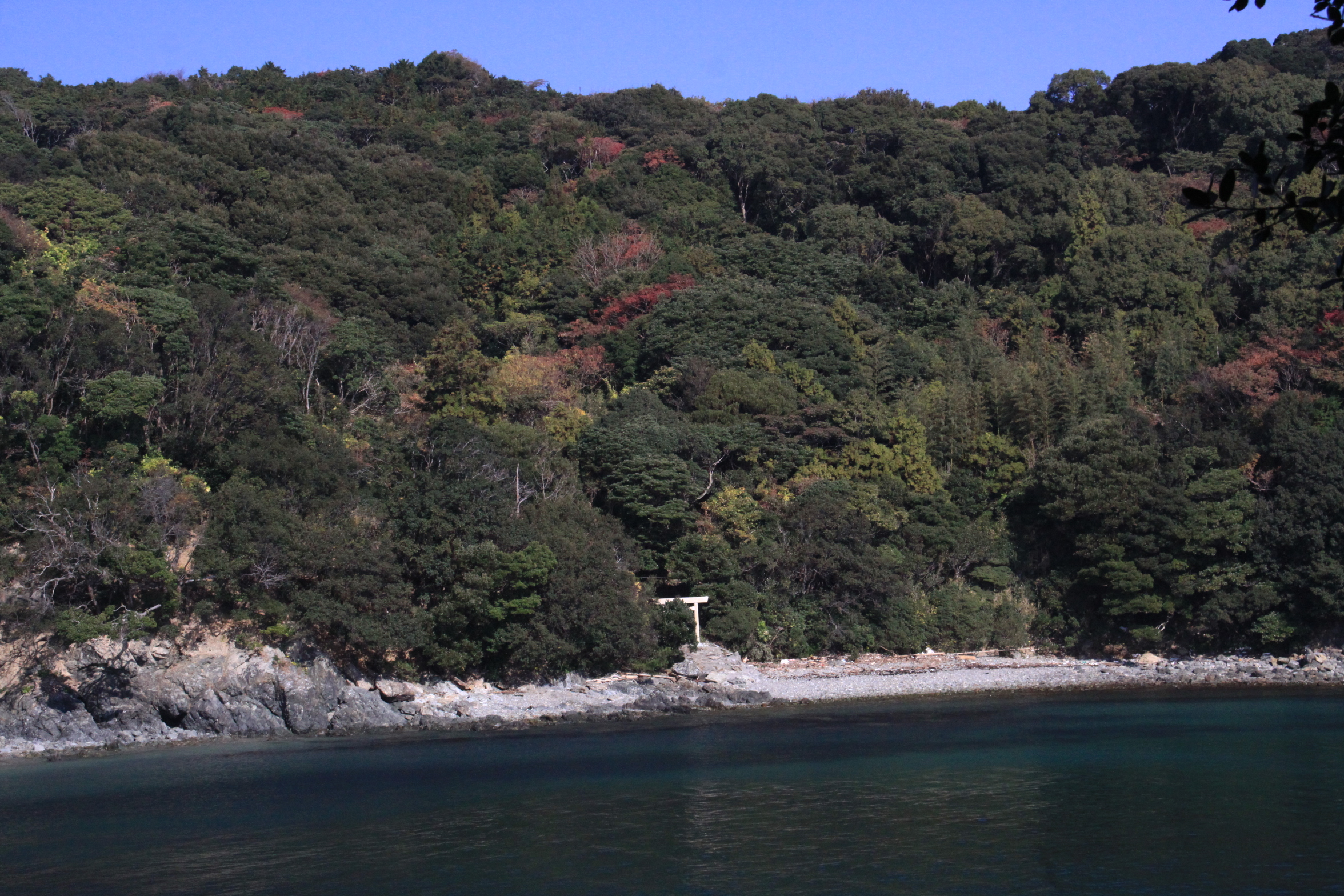
Kaburako Promontory

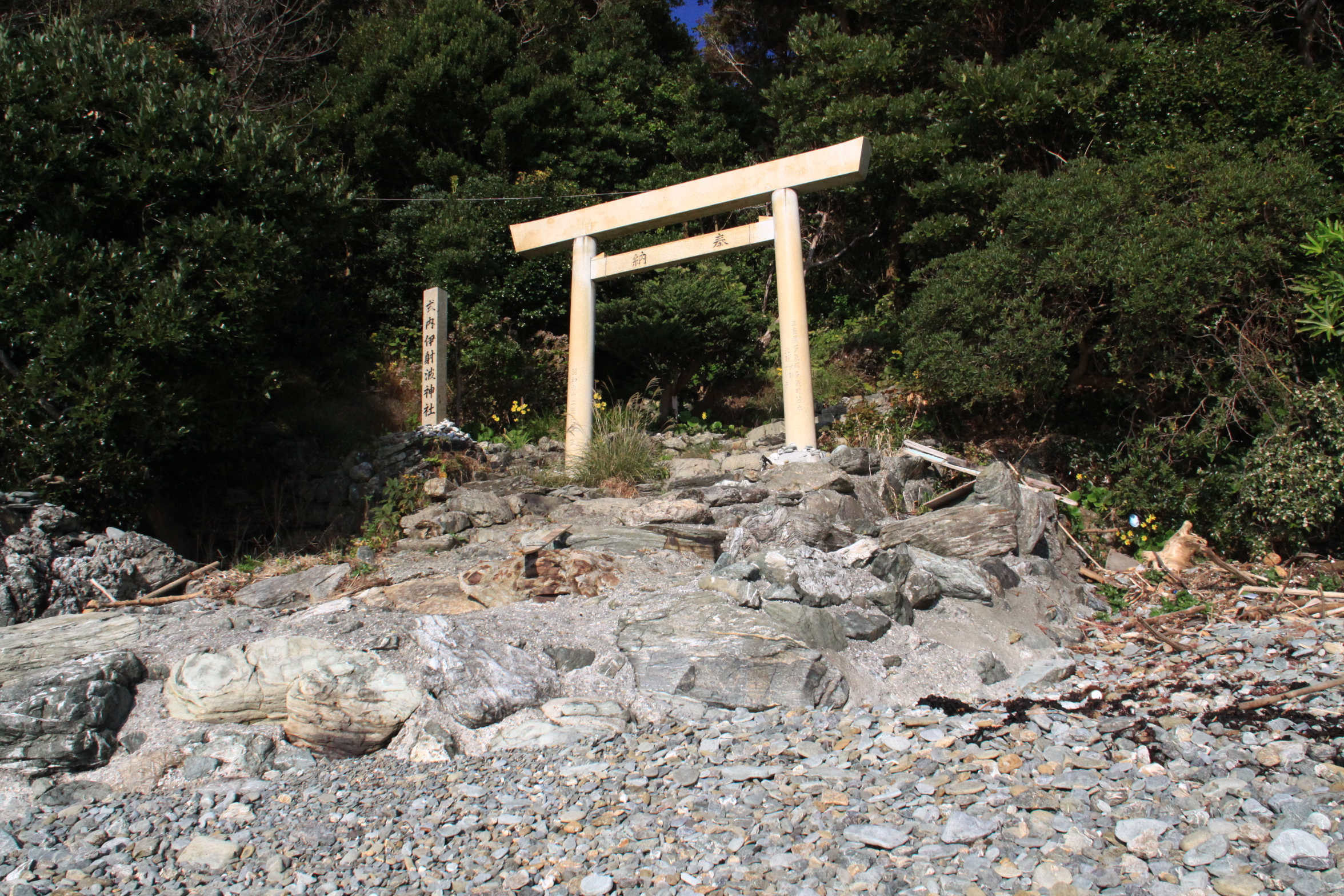
Ichi-no-Torii

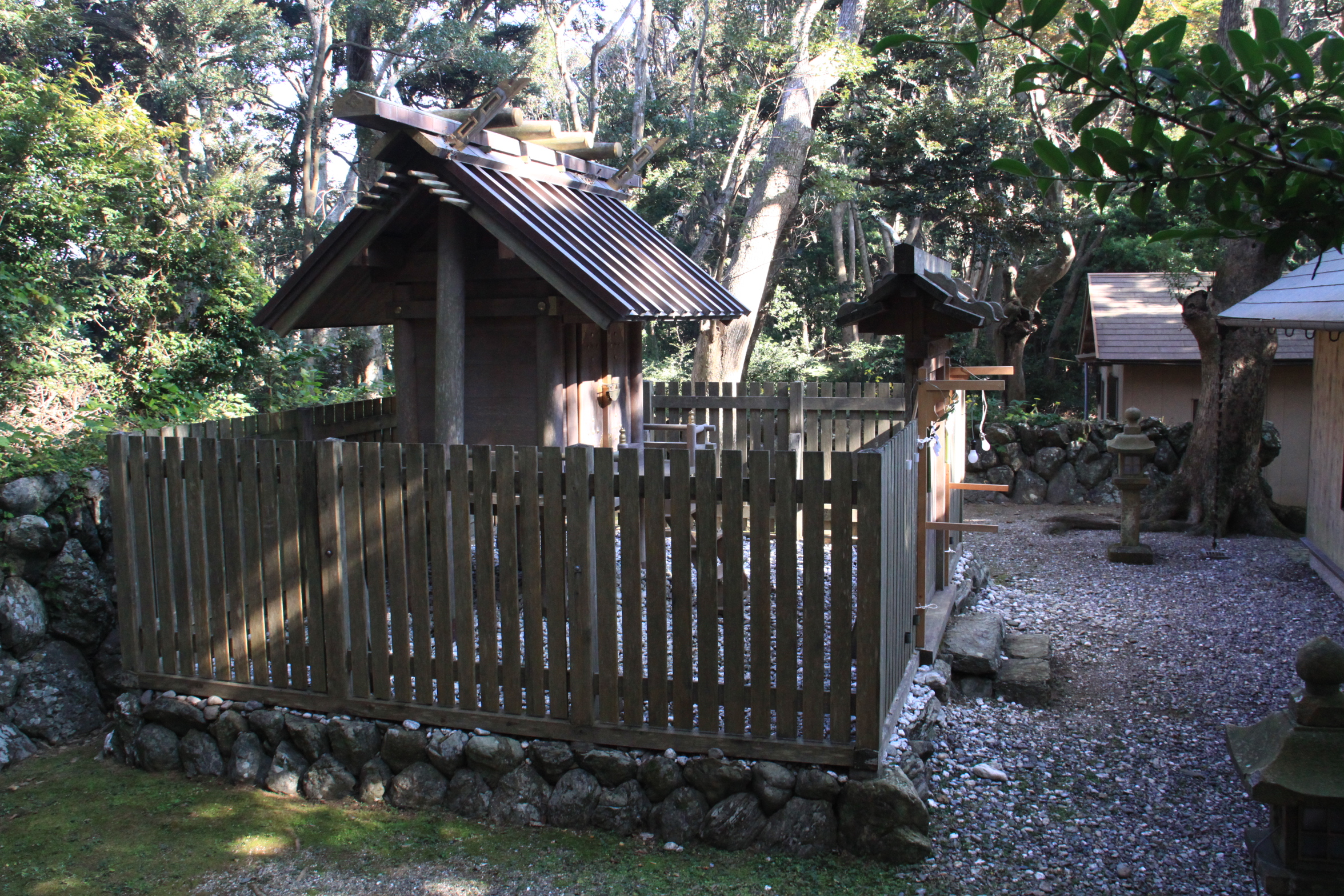
Honden

== See also ==
- List of Shinto shrines
