= Kashii-gū =

Shinto shrine in Fukuoka Prefecture, Japan

Kashii-gū 香椎宮
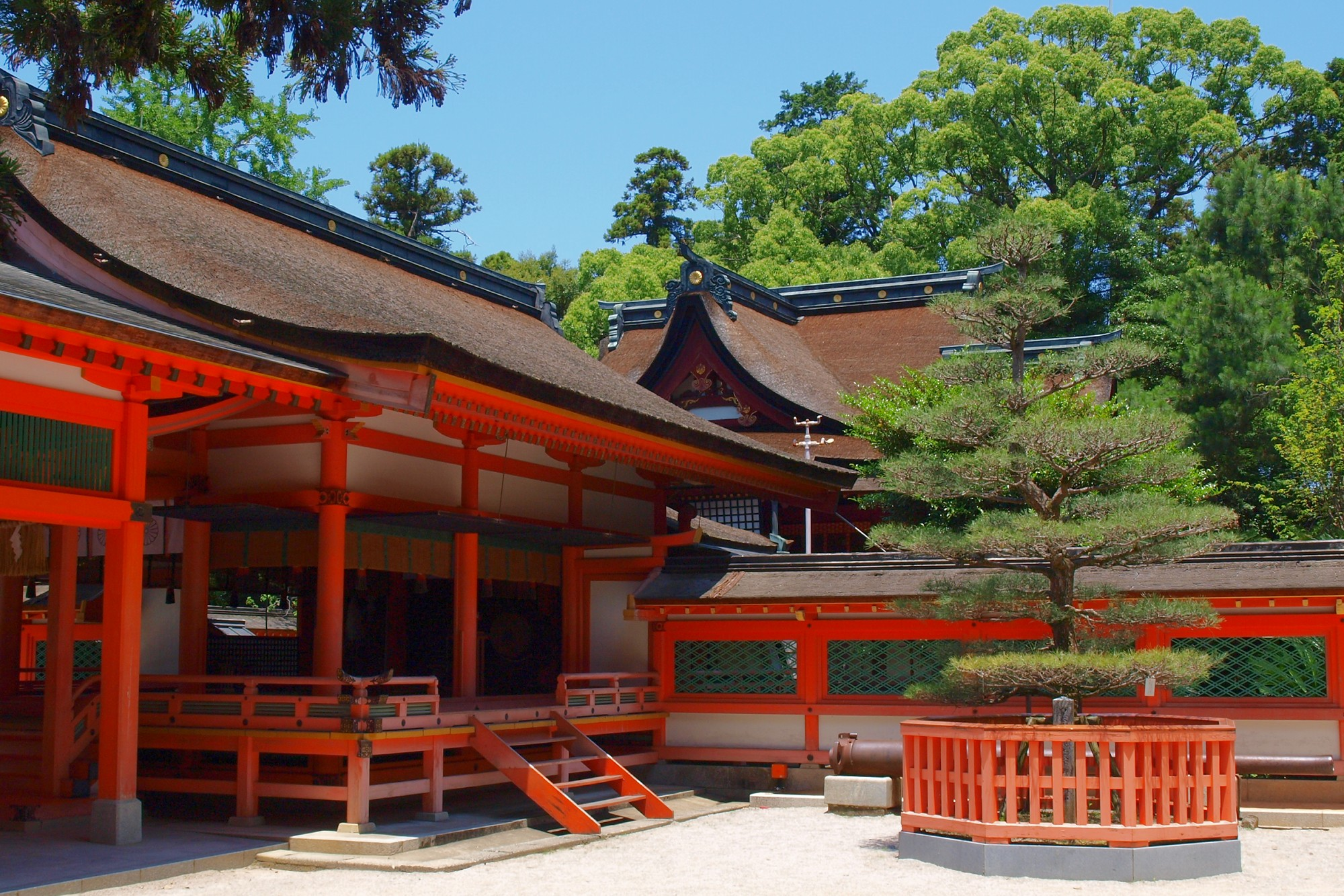

- Location within Japan

Religion
- Affiliation: Shinto
- Deity: Emperor Chūai; Empress Jingū
- Type: Chokusaisha; Kanpei-taisha; Beppyo Jinja

Location
- Location: 4-16-1, Kashii, Higashi-ku, Fukuoka; Fukuoka 813-0011
- Interactive map of Kashii-gū 香椎宮
- Coordinates: 33°39′13″N 130°27′10″E

Architecture
- Style: kashii-zukuri
- Founder: Empress Jingū
- Established: 724

Website
- kashiigu.com

Kashii-gū (香椎宮) is a Shinto shrine located in Higashi-ku, Fukuoka, Japan. It is dedicated to Emperor Chūai and Empress Jingū.

== History ==
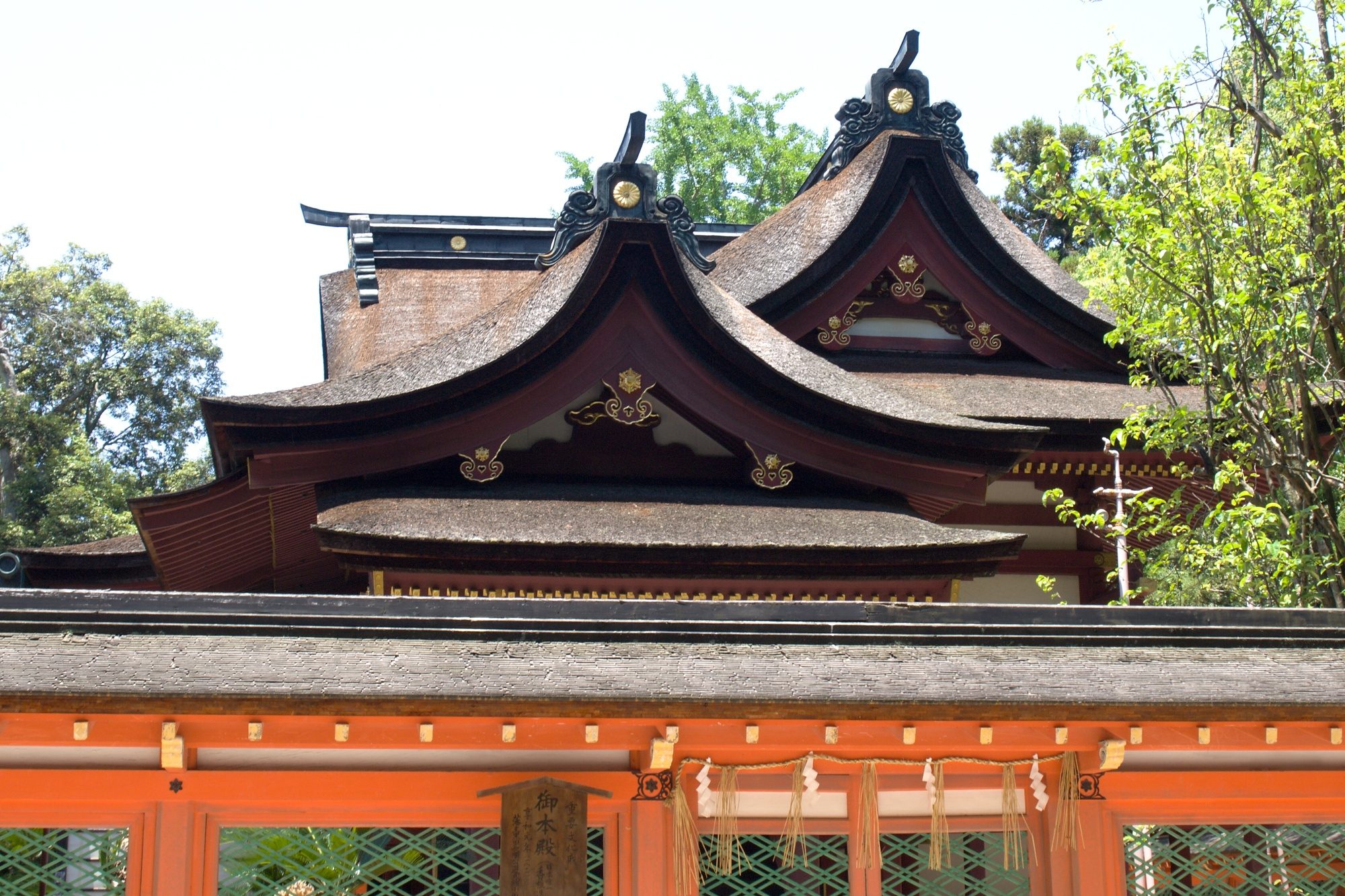
The Honden or main shrine (Important Cultural Property)

== See also ==
- List of Shinto shrines
