= Nan'yō Shrine =

Defunct Shinto shrine in Koror, Palau

Nanyo Shrine (南洋神社)
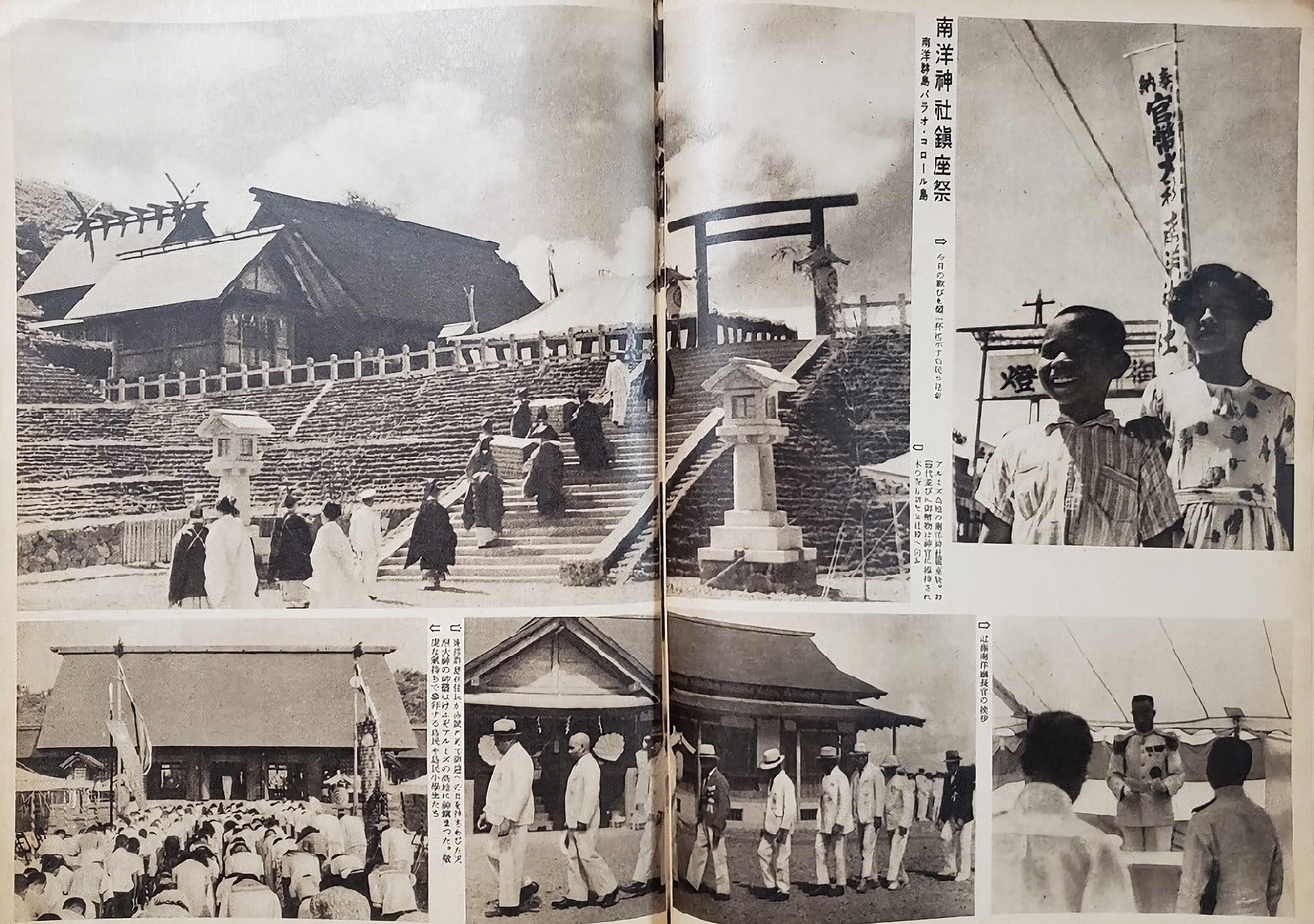
- Nanyo Shrine at Koror – 1940

- Location within Palau

Religion
- Affiliation: Shinto
- Deity: Amaterasu
- Type: Kanpei-taisha

Location
- Location: Koror, Palau
- Coordinates: 7.3390°N 134.4975°E

Architecture
- Established: 1–3 November 1940
- Demolished: 1944

Nanyo Shrine (南洋神社, Nan'yō-jinja) was a Shinto shrine located on the island of Koror, in Palau. The shrine was the ichinomiya (highest ranking shrine) of the government of the South Seas Mandate, a League of Nations mandated territory administered by the Empire of Japan. It was established in 1940 and designated for the veneration of Amaterasu-Ōmikami.

== History ==
The process which led to the establishment of the shrine began mid-1930s when the regional planning agency (Nan'yō Takushoku) was charged with the Japanization of Micronesia. The chief advocate for the shrine was Domoto Teiichi, who had been the Private Secretary to the Governor of the South Seas Mandate since 1936.

The enshrinement ceremonies took three days, November 1–3, 1940 (Showa 15, 1st–3rd day of the 11th month). The shrine was situated at Koror because it was the Japanese colonial capital. From the outset, the Nan'yō Shrine was officially designated one of the Kanpei-taisha (官幣大社), meaning that it stood in the first rank of government-supported shrines. The shrine was construed by the Japanese government as marking "a step forward in the sacred task of constructing a New East Asian Order."

When Allied forces threatened Palau in late 1944, the kami and sacred symbols of the shrine were evacuated to Japan by submarine. The shrine remained untouched by American bombing, but Japan's defeat in World War II ended its administration. The shrine was dismantled for use in rebuilding Koror. Only the stone steps to the upper platform and stone lanterns remain.

In 1983, plans were developed for a reconstruction of the shrine at its former site, and a miniature replica of the original shrine was completed with the funding of private sponsors from Japan in 1993.

== See also ==
- List of Shinto shrines
- Modern system of ranked Shinto Shrines
