= Heijō Shrine =

1913–1945 Shinto shrine in Pyongyang

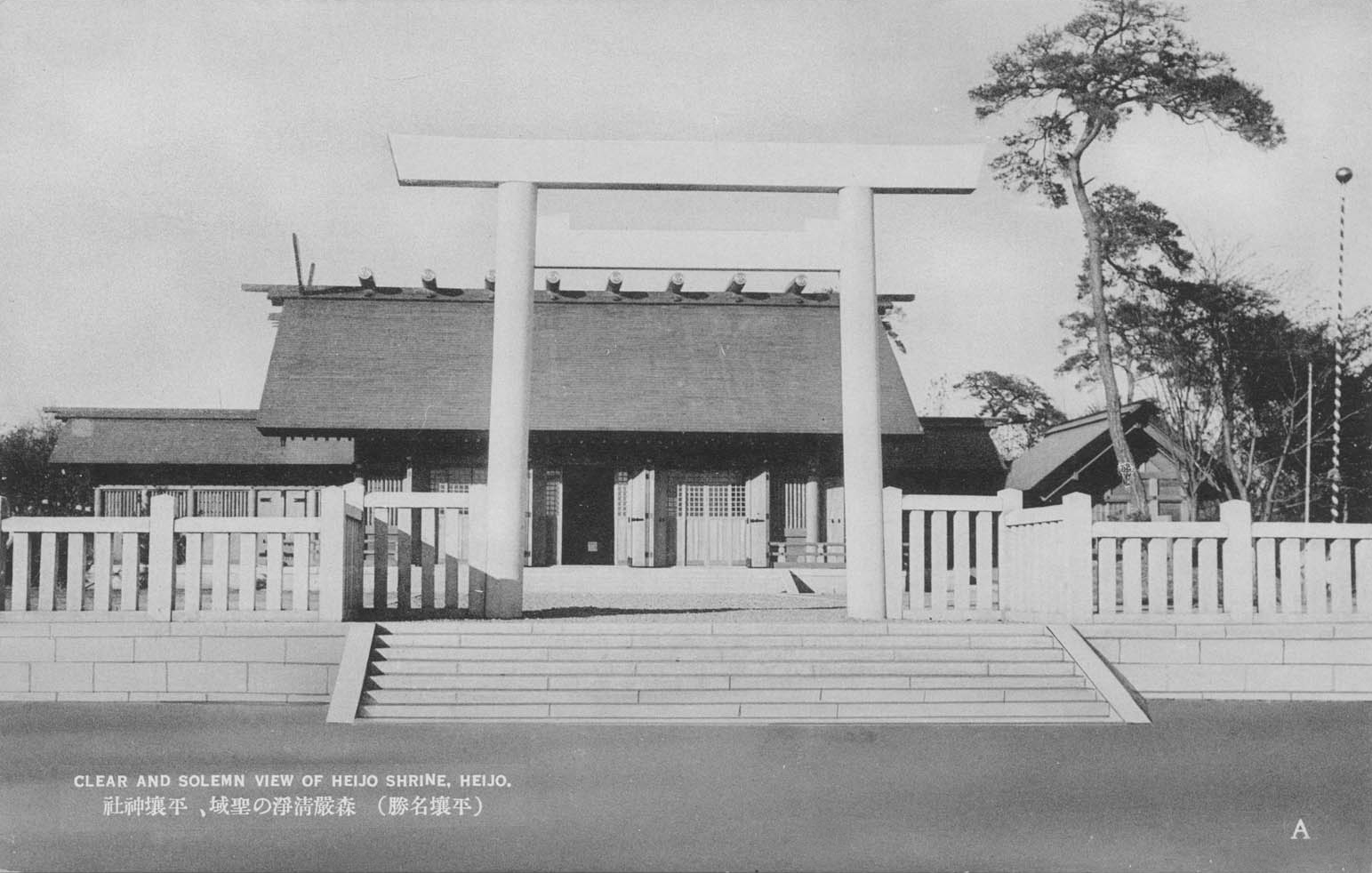
- The shrine (date unknown)

Religion
- Affiliation: Shinto
- Deity: Kunitama Okami; Amaterasu Okami

Location
- Location: Pyongyang, Korea, Empire of Japan
- Interactive map of Heijō Shrine
- Coordinates: 39.03534°N 125.7552°E

Architecture
- Completed: 1913
- Destroyed: August 16, 1945
- Demolished: August 16, 1945

Heijō Shrine (Japanese: 平壌神社, Hepburn: Heijō jinja; Korean: 평양신사) was a Shinto shrine in Pyongyang, Korea during the Japanese colonial period. It was established in 1913 and destroyed in 1945.

Its name derived from the Japanese name for Pyongyang during its occupation of Korea. The shrine's main annual festival was held on October 2. It was formerly a national shrine of the third rank (国幣小社, kokuhei-shōsha) in the Modern system of ranked Shinto Shrines.

The shrine was destroyed on August 16, 1945: just after Japan first announced its surrender in World War II. That day, local Koreans set fire to the shrine and destroyed it. Hundreds of similar cases arose throughout the peninsula in the following week.

In modern times, the site is a park, with a statue of Kim Il Sung built at the site of the shrine's building.

== Gallery ==
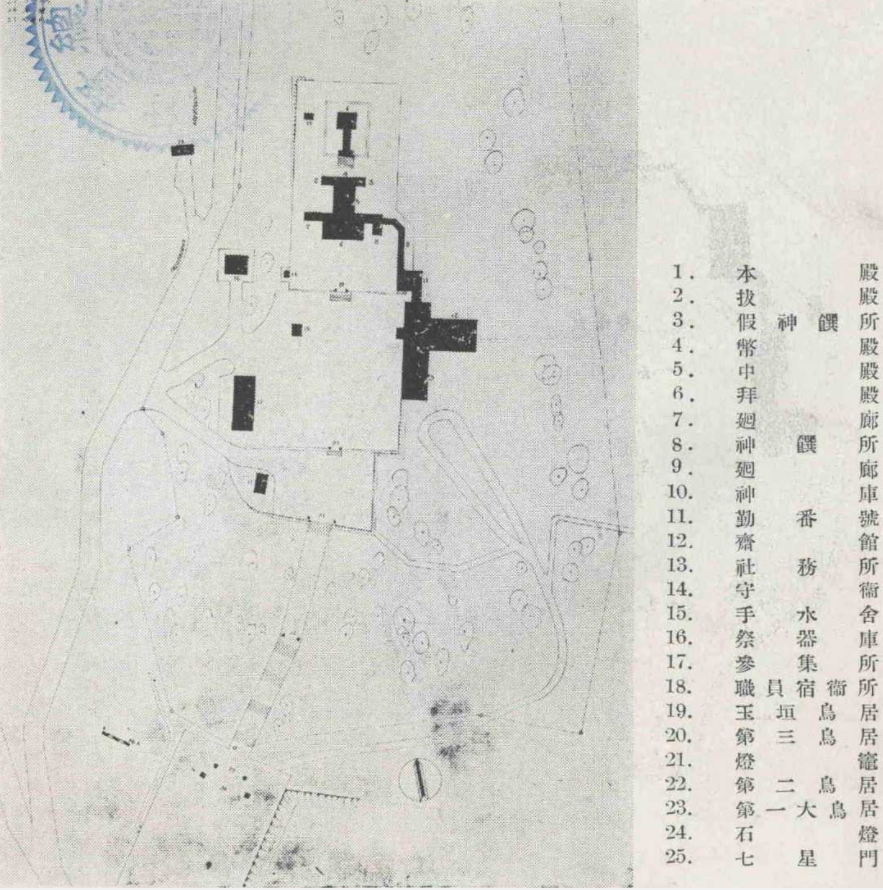
Map of layout of the shrine (1942)

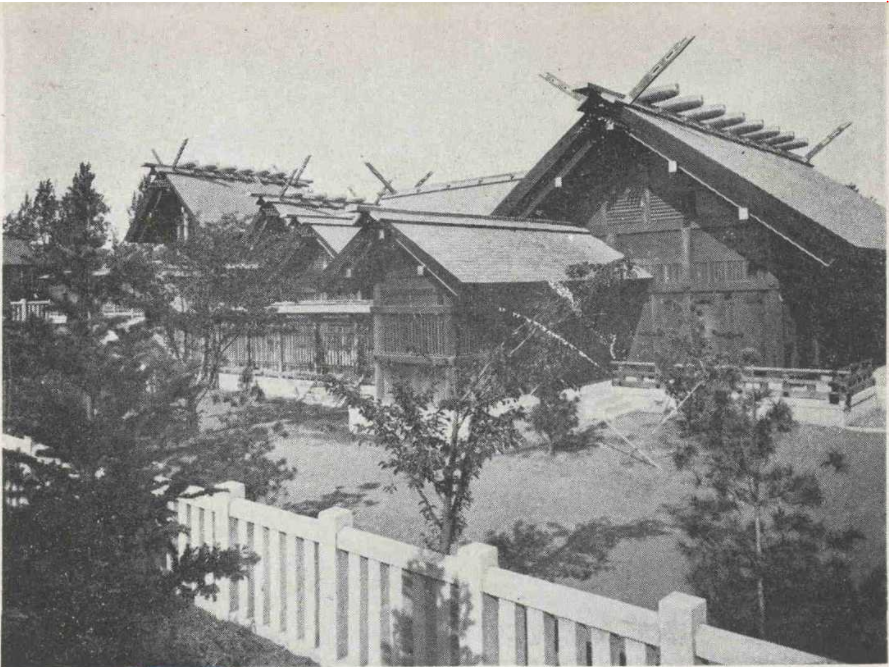
Side of the shrine (1942)

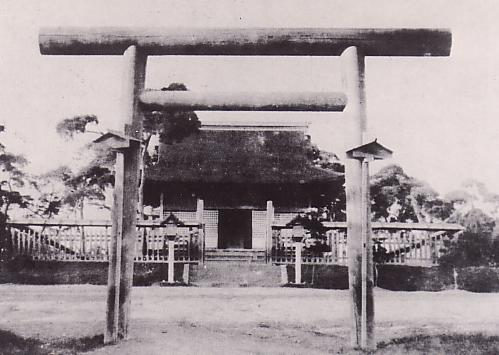
Another view of the shrine
