= Imamiya Ebisu Shrine =

Shrine in Naniwa-ku, Osaka, Osaka Prefecture, Japan

Coordinates: 34.6553°N 135.5025°E

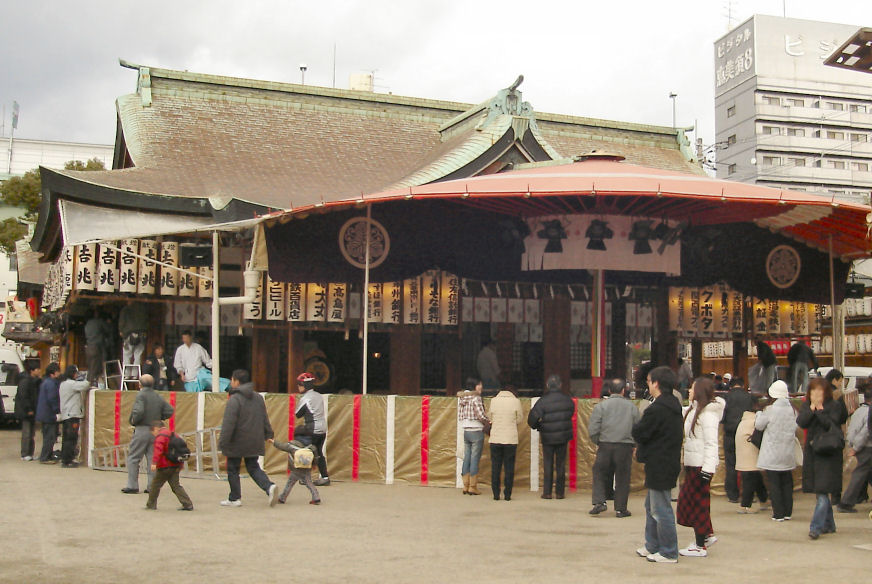

Religion
- Affiliation: Shinto
- Deity: Kotoshironushi (Ebisu)

Location
- Interactive map of Imamiya Ebisu Shrine

Imamiya Ebisu Shrine (今宮戎神社, Imamiya Ebisu jinja) is a Shinto shrine located in Naniwa-ku, Osaka Prefecture, Japan. According to legend, it was established in 600 during the reign of Empress Suiko. Its annual festival is held from January 9 to 11. The kami enshrined here included Amaterasu (天照皇大神), Kotoshironushi (事代主命, also known as Ebisu), Susanoo-no-Mikoto (素盞鳴尊), Tsukuyomi-no-Mikoto (月読尊), and Wakahiru-me (稚日女尊).

== See also ==
- List of Shinto shrines in Japan
