= Sasamuta Shrine =

Shinto shrine in Ōita Prefecture, Japan

Sasamuta Jinja 西寒多神社
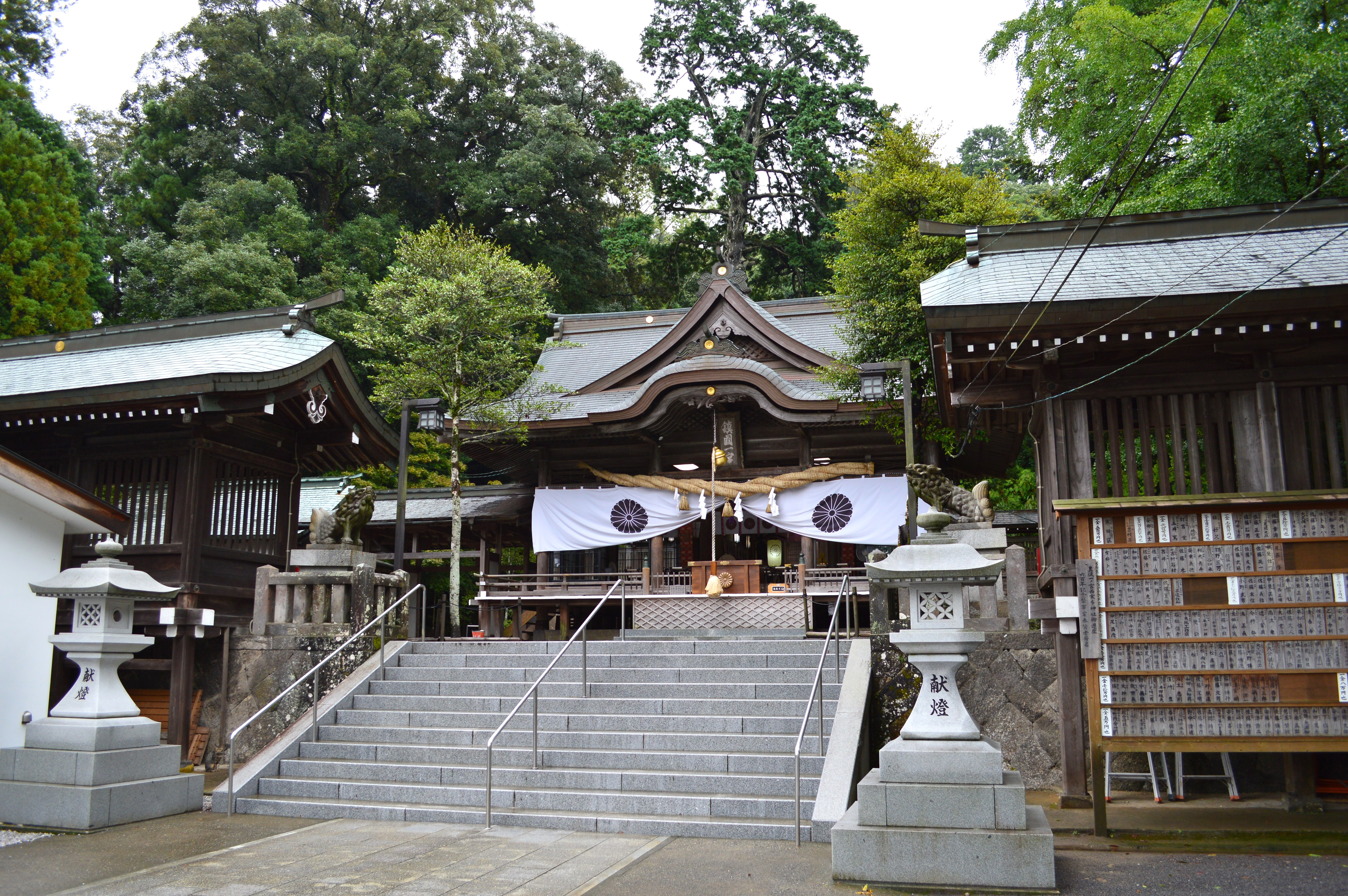
- Haiden of Sasamuta Jinja

- Location within Oita Prefecture Location within Japan

Religion
- Affiliation: Shinto
- Deity: Sasamuta-Ōkami
- Festival: April 15

Location
- Location: 1644 Soda, Ōita-shi, Ōita-ken
- Interactive map of Sasamuta Jinja 西寒多神社
- Coordinates: 33°10′22″N 131°35′54.2″E

Architecture
- Established: unknown

Sasamuta Jinja (西寒多神社) is a Shinto shrine in the Soda neighborhood of the city of Ōita in Ōita Prefecture, Japan. It is one of the shrines claiming to be the ichinomiya of former Bungo Province. The main festival of the shrine is held annually on April 15.

== Enshrined kami ==
The kami enshrined at Sasamuta Jinja is Sasamuta-Ōkami (西寒多大神), which is an amalgamation of:

- Amaterasu (天照皇大御神)
- Tsukuyomi-no-Mikoto (月読尊)
- Ame-no-oshihomimi (天忍穗耳尊)

== History ==
According to the Ōita Gunshi (大分郡志), Empress Jingu visited Mount Sasamuta on her way back from the conquest of the Korean Peninsula, and planted a white flag at the top of the mountain as proof of her visit. The local people revered it and tied a fence around it to worship it. Later, in April of the 9th year of Emperor Ojin's reign, Takenouchi no Sukune built a shrine on the site, which established that the mountain was a sacred mountain. The shrine first appears in documentary history in an article dated March 22, 869, in the Nihon Sandai Jitsuroku, where it is written that Sasamuta-Ōkami was given the rank of Junior Fifth Rank. It reappears in the Engishiki listing of the mid-Heian period, where it has the distinction of being classed as the only "major shrine" in Bungo Province. Although it declined after the late Heian period, it was revived by the Ōtomo clan, from the Kamakura period onwards. In March 1408, Ōtomo Shinze relocated the shrine from the top of the mountain to its current location at the foot of the mountain. During the Edo period, the Makino clan and then the Naitō clan of Nobeoka Domain, frequently sponsored renovation and repairs, and their feudal retainers also donated items such as stone lanterns.

During the Meiji period era of State Shinto, the shrine was designated as a National shrine, 2nd rank (国幣中社, kokuhei-chūsha) under the Modern system of ranked Shinto Shrines

== Mannen-bashi ==
The Mannenbashi (万年橋) is a 22-meter long single-arch stone bridge that spans the Samuda River (commonly known as the Misogi River), which flows through the entrance to Sasamuta Shrine. It was designated as a Tangible Cultural Property of Ōita Prefecture on April 8, 1980. Not only is the main structure an arch, but the road surface also forms a gentle arc, and the stonework between the road surface and the arch is narrow. In 1862 at the end of the Edo period, the village headman of Samuta village, which was then part of the Nobeoka Domain, started a stone masonry business in Shibakita village, Ono district (currently Bungo-ono, Ōita), which was part of Oka Domain.

== Gallery ==
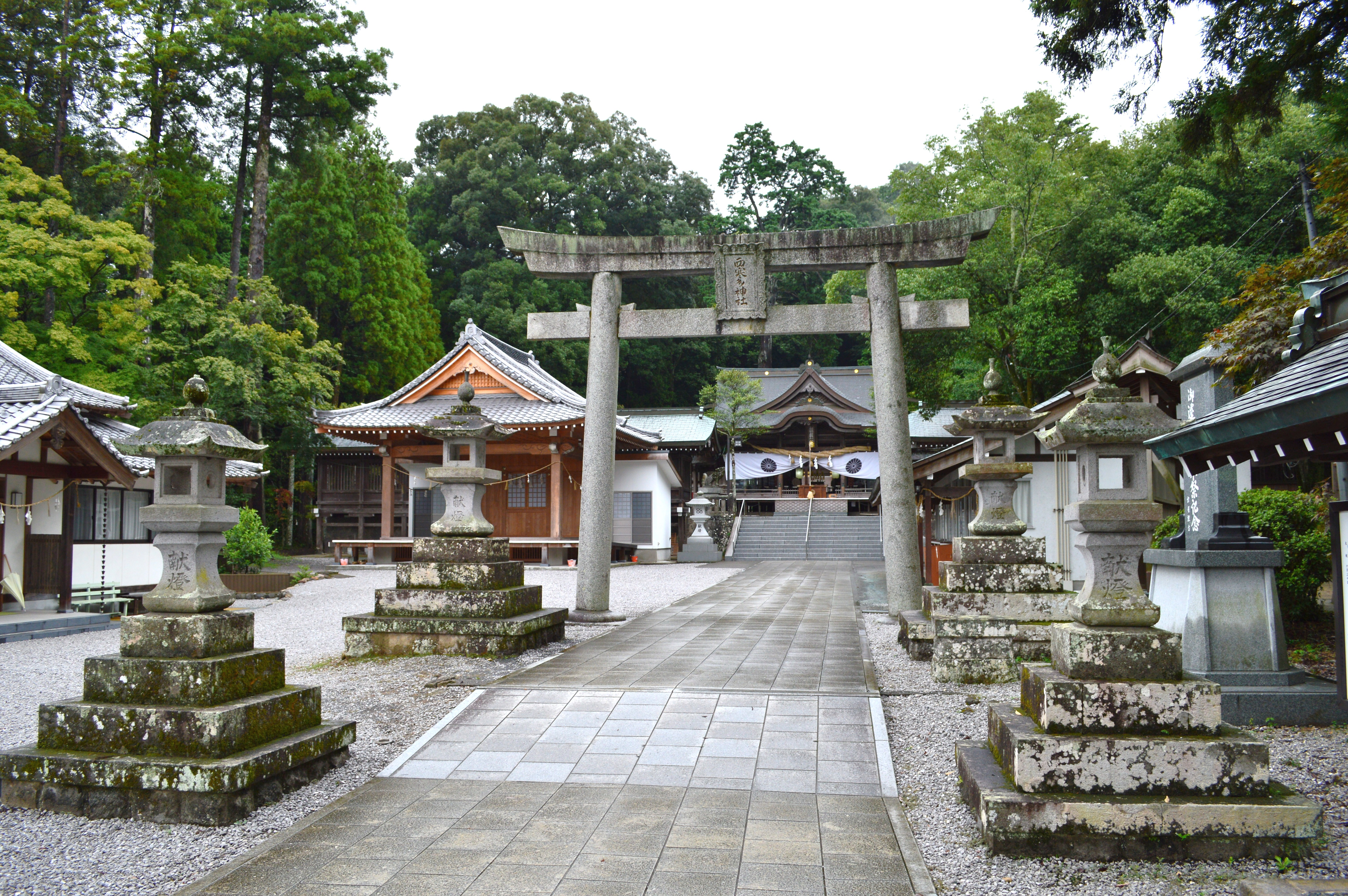
Torii

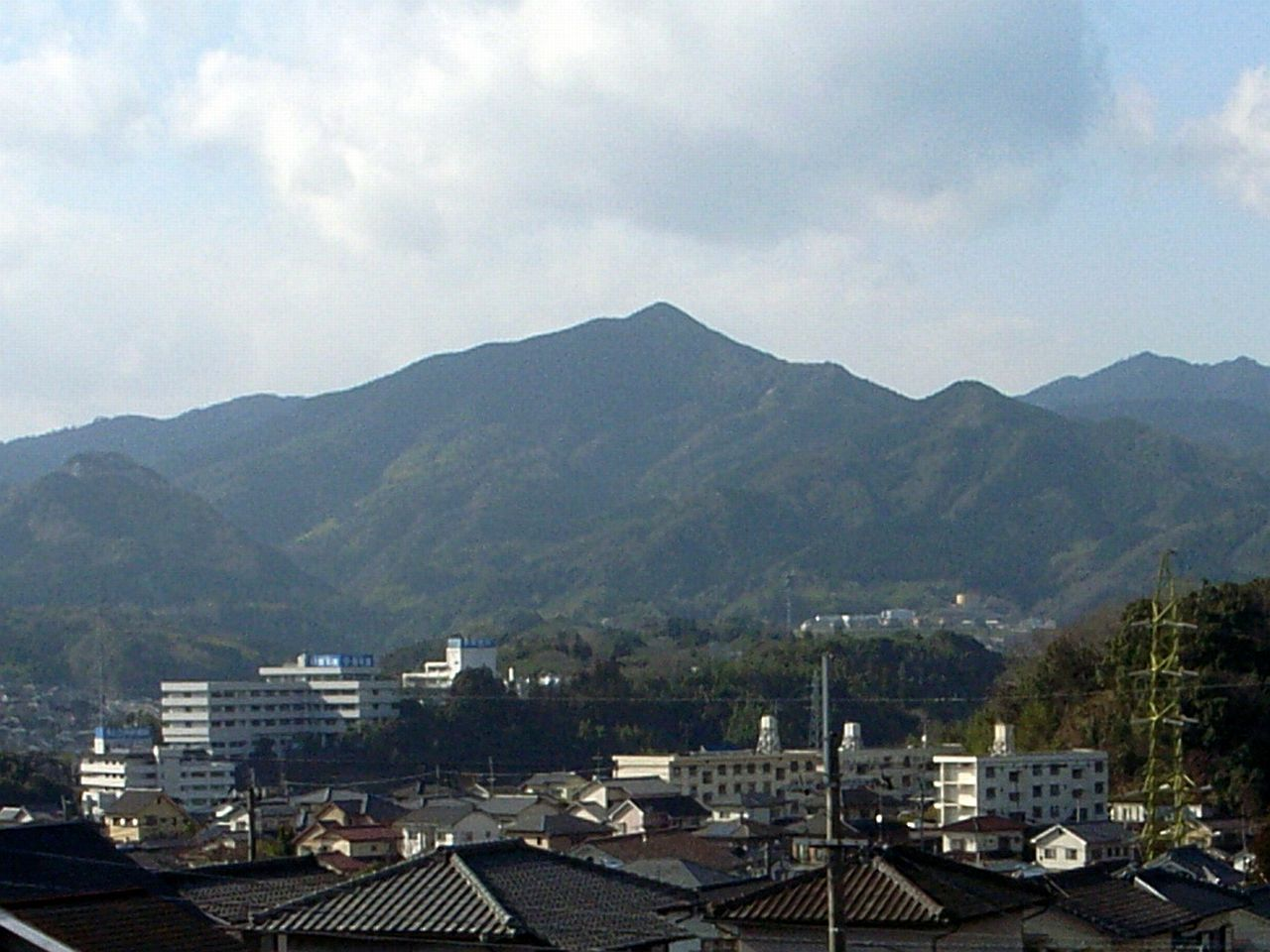
Mout Hongu

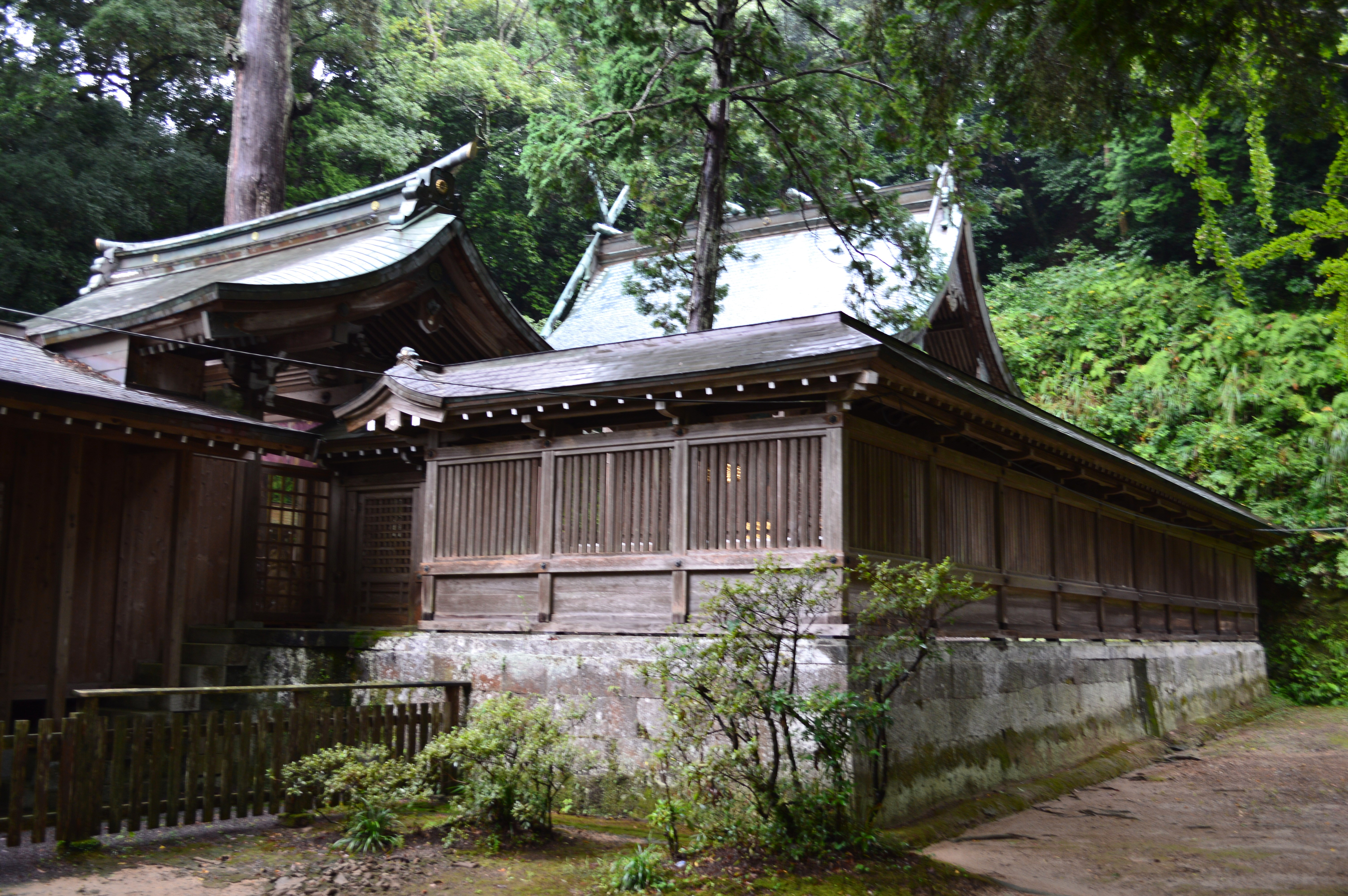
Honden

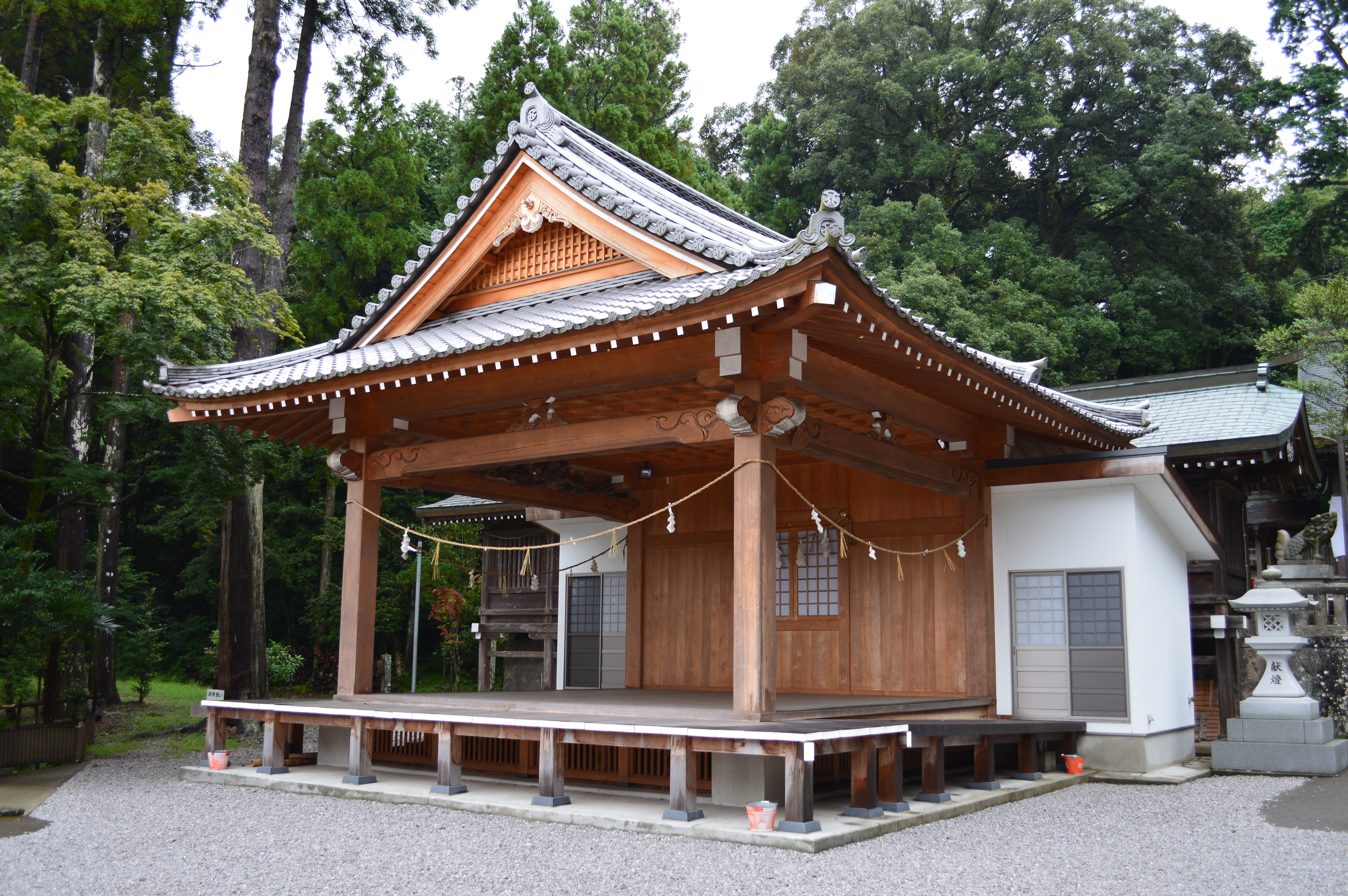
Kagura-den

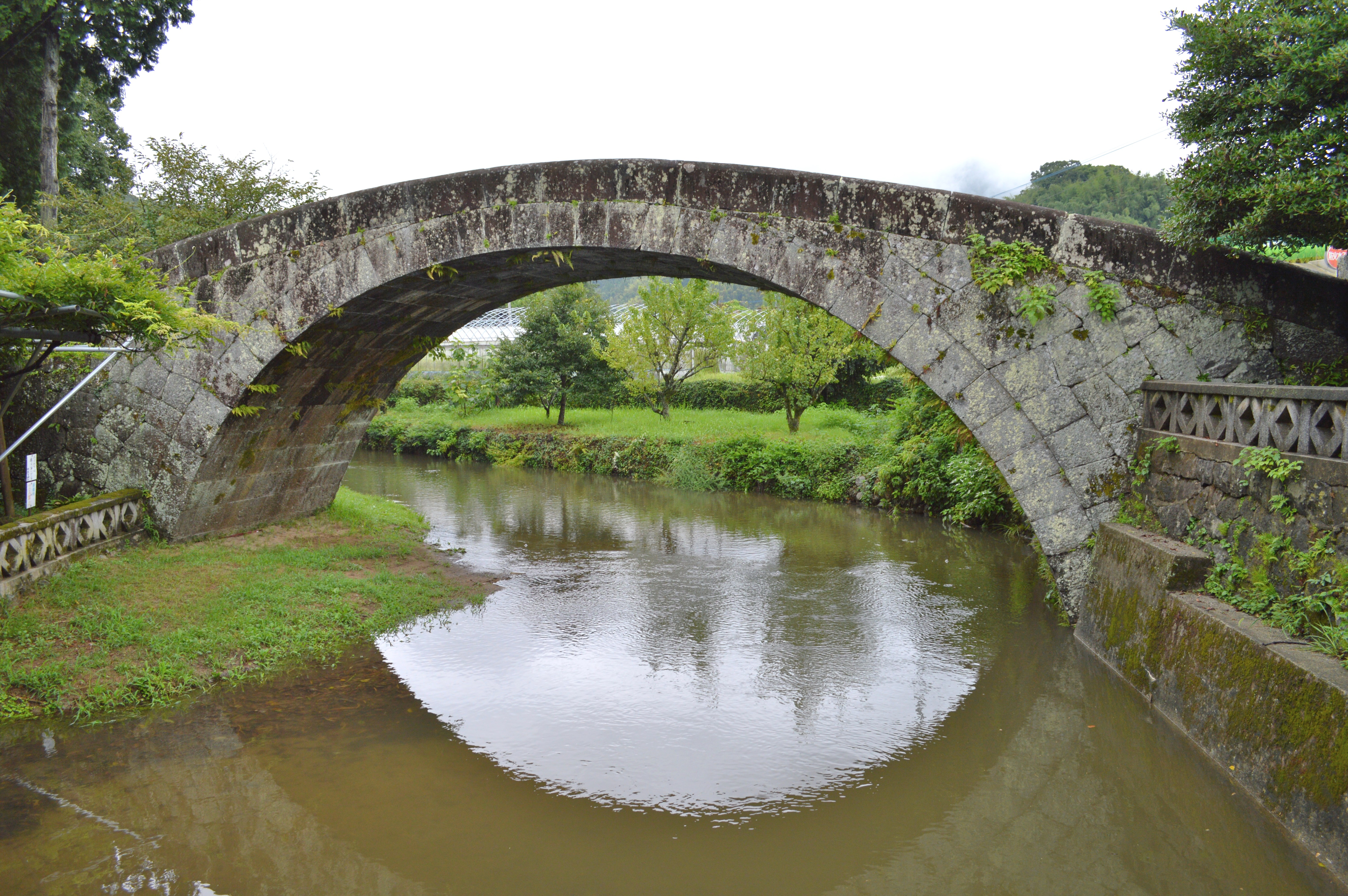
Mannen-bashi (P.ICIP)

== See also ==
- List of Shinto shrines
- Ichinomiya
