= Chokusaisha =

Type of Shinto shrine

Chokusaisha (勅祭社) is a shrine where an imperial envoy Chokushi (勅使) performs rituals: chokushi sankō no jinja (勅使参向の神社). The following table shows sixteen shrines designated as Chokusaisha.

Name		Location
Kamo-jinja (賀茂神社)	Kamowakeikazuchi-jinja (賀茂別雷神社)	Kita-ku, Kyoto
Kamo-jinja (賀茂神社)	Kamomioya-jinja (賀茂御祖神社)	Sakyō-ku, Kyoto
Iwashimizu Hachiman-gū (石清水八幡宮)		Yawata, Kyoto
Kasuga-taisha (春日大社)		Nara, Nara
Atsuta-jingū (熱田神宮)		Atsuta-ku, Nagoya
Izumo-taisha (出雲大社)		Izumo, Shimane
Hikawa-jinja (氷川神社)		Ōmiya-ku, Saitama
Kashima-jingū (鹿島神宮)		Kashima, Ibaraki
Katori-jingū (香取神宮)		Katori, Chiba
Kashihara-jingū (橿原神宮)		Kashihara, Nara
Ōmi-jingū (近江神宮)		Ōtsu, Shiga
Heian-jingū (平安神宮)		Sakyō-ku, Kyoto
Meiji-jingū (明治神宮)		Shibuya-ku, Tokyo
Yasukuni-jinja (靖国神社)		Chiyoda-ku, Tokyo
Usa-jingū (宇佐神宮)		Usa, Oita
Kashii-gū (香椎宮)		Higashi-ku, Fukuoka
