= Wakahiru-me =

Japanese goddess

Wakahirume is a goddess of the rising sun in Japanese mythology in Shinto mythology. She is the daughter or younger sister of the sun goddess Amaterasu. Some interpretations view her as the personification of the morning sun.

She was involved in making garments for the kami. In some versions Wakahirume was killed when Susanoo threw a flayed pony at her while she was in Amaterasu's weaving hall as written in the Nihongi. The goddess also appears in the Jindaiki where the boat returning from Empress Jingū's sankan-gaisei (campaign for the three Korean kingdoms) tried to head to Nanba and could not go straight, they returned to Muko no minato Port (Kobe Port) to do some fortune-telling. Wakahirume no mikoto appeared and there was a divine message, 'I would like to stay in Ikuta Nagao no kuni'. Thus, Unagami no Isachi was ordered to enshrine her. This is today's Ikuta Shrine.
