= List of Shinto shrines in Japan =

This is a list of notable Shinto shrines in Japan. There are tens of thousands of shrines in Japan. Shrines with structures that are National Treasures of Japan are covered by the List of National Treasures of Japan (shrines). For Shinto shrines in other countries, scroll down to the See also section.

This list includes all Beppyo shrines and provincial Sōja Shrines and Ichinomiya

Shinto shrines from specific sects or new churches are not included in this list.

== Hokkaidō and Tōhoku ==
=== Hokkaidō ===
- Ebetsu Shrine
- Hakodate Hachimangū
- Hokkaidō Gokoku Shrine
- Hokkaidō Jingu
- Hokkaidō Tōshō-gū
- Hokumon Shrine
- Itsukushima Shrine
- Iwamizawa Shrine
- Kamikawa Shrine
- Nishino Shrine
- Obihiro Shrine
- Ōta Shrine
- Sapporo Hachimangū
- Shiraoi Hachiman Shrine
- Sumiyoshi Shrine
- Tarumaezan Shrine
- Ubagami Daijingū

=== Aomori ===
- Hirosaki Tōshō-gū
- Iwakiyama Shrine
- Kabushima Shrine
- Kushihiki Hachimangū
- Saruka Shrine
- Takayama Inari Shrine
- Uramachi Shinmeigū
- Utou Shrine

=== Iwate ===
- Komagata Shrine
- Kotohira Shrine (Kuji City)
- Morioka Hachiman Shrine
- Shiwa Inari Shrine

=== Miyagi ===
- Aoba Shrine
- Aoso Shrine
- Atago Shrine
- Futahashira Shrine
- Hayama Shrine
- Kameoka Hachimangū
- Kashima Miko Shrine
- Kamo Shrine (Sendai City)
- Kinkasan Shrine
- Koganeyama Shrine
- Kumano Shrine
- Miyagi Gokoku Shrine
- Mutsu Sōsha-no-miya
- Ōsaki Hachimangū
- Sendai Tōshō-gū
- Shiogama Shrine
- Shirahige Shrine
- Sumiyoshi Shrine
- Takekoma Inari Shrine
- Tsubonuma Hachiman Shrine
- Zuihōden

=== Akita ===
- Koshiō Shrine
- Kumano Shrine
- Sanko Shrine
- Tsuchizaki Shinmeisha
- Taiheizan Miyoshi Shrine
- Akita Suwa Shrine
- Akita Prefecture Gokoku Shrine

=== Yamagata ===
- Chōkaisan Ōmonoimi Shrine
- Dewa Sanzan (Three Mountains of Dewa)
  - Gassan Shrine
  - Yudonosan Shrine
  - Hagurosan Shrine
- Haguro Shrine (Yonezawa)
- Kinpō Shrine
- Kumano Shrine
- Saikan
- Torigoe Hachiman Shrine
- Tsukioka Shrine
- Uesugi Shrine
- Yamagata Prefecture Gokoku Shrine
- Ayukai Hachimangu
- Yachi Hachimangu
- Chōkai gassan ryōsho-gu
- Sagae Hachimangu
- Hokutan Shrine
- Rokusho Shrine

=== Fukushima ===
- Chinju Hachiman Shrine
- Fukushima Gokoku Shrine
- Iino Hachimangū
- Isasumi Shrine
- Kashima Shrine
- Kogaikuni Shrine
- Okaburaya Shrine
- Ryōzen Shrine
- Sumiyoshi Shrine
- Tsutsukowake Shrine

== Kantō ==
=== Tochigi ===
- Futarasan Shrine
- Hoshinomiya Shrine (Sano, Tochigi)
- Karasawayama Shrine
- Nikkō Tōshō-gū
- Utsunomiya Futarayama Shrine
- Ōmiwa Shrine (Shimotsuke)

=== Ibaraki ===
- Ibaraki Prefectural Gokoku Shrine
- Hitachinokuni Sōshagū
- Kasama Inari Shrine
- Kashima Jingū
- Oarai Isosaki Shrine
- Sakatsura Isosaki Shrine
- Tokiwa Shrine
- Tsukubasan Shrine
- Mito Tōshō-gū
- Osugi Shrine

=== Gunma ===
- Agatsuma Shrine
- Gunma Gokoku Shrine
- Haruna Shrine
- Ikushina Shrine
- Maebashi Tōshō-gū
- Nakanotake Shrine
- Nukisaki Shrine
- Serada Tōshō-gū
- Sōja Shrine

=== Saitama ===
- Arahata Fuji Shrine
- Chichibu Shrine
- Hatogamine Hachiman Shrine
- Hodosan Shrine
- Hikawa Shrine (Kawagoe)
- Hikawa Shrine (Saitama)
- Kanasana Shrine
- Koma Shrine
- Mitsumine Shrine
- Oshi Tōshō-gū
- Senba Tōshō-gū
- Tokorozawa Shinmei Shrine
- Yakyu Inari Shrine
- Washinomiya Shrine

=== Chiba ===
- Awa Shrine
- Chiba Shrine
- Chiba Gokoku Shrine
- Funabashi Shrine
- Katori Shrine
- Komikado Shrine
- Ōhi Shrine
- Susaki Shrine
- Tamasaki Shrine
- Towatari Shrine
- Tsutsumori Shrine
- Yōkaichiba Tōshō-gū
- Rokusho Shrine (Tateyama)
- Tsuruya Hachiman Shrine
- Iigaoka Hachimangu
- Rokusho Shrine (Ichikawa)

=== Tokyo ===
- Asakusa Shrine
- Atago Shrine
- Hanazono Shrine
- Hie Shrine
- Shibuya Jinja
- Kanda Shrine
- Kume no Heinai-dō
- Meiji Shrine
- Namiyoke Inari Shrine
- Nezu Shrine
- Nogi Shrine
- Oji Shrine
- Ōmiya Hachiman Shrine
- Shōin shrine
- Suiten-gū
- Three Palace Sanctuaries, Kokyo Imperial Palace
- Tokyo Daijingu
- Tsukudo Shrine
- Togo Shrine
- Toyokawa Inari Tokyo
- Yasukuni Shrine
- Yushima Tenmangū
- Igusa Hachimangu
- Ōkunitama Shrine
- Nitta Shrine (Ōta Ward)

=== Kanagawa ===
- Egara Tenjin Shrine
- Enoshima Shrine
- Oyama Aburi Shrine
- Hakone Shrine
- Hōtoku Ninomiya Shrine
- Kamakura-gū
- Samukawa Shrine
- Tsurugaoka Hachiman Shrine
- Iseyama Kotaijingu
- Hiratsuka Hachimangu
- Inage Shrine
- Rokusho Shrine

== Shin'etsu and Hokuriku ==
=== Niigata ===
- Amatsu Shrine
- Kota Shrine
- Watatsu Shrine
- Yahiko Shrine
- Niigata Gokoku Shrine
- Hakusan Shrine
- Fuchū Hachiman-gū
- Sōsha Shrine

=== Toyama ===
- Imizu Shrine
- Oyama Shrine
- Takase Shrine
- Toyamaken Gokoku Shrine
- Toyama Chukyoin
- Hie Shrine (Toyama)

=== Ishikawa ===
- Keta Taisha
- Onominato Shrine
- Oyama Shrine
- Shirayama Hime Shrine
- Sugo Ishibe Shrine
- Ishikawa Gokoku Shrine
- Isobe Shrine
- Sōsha

=== Fukui ===
- Fujishima Shrine
- Kanegasaki-gū
- Kehi Shrine
- Ōshio Hachiman Shrine
- Wakasahiko Shrine
- Tsurugi Shrine
- Fukui Shrine
- Shinmei Shrine
- Fukui Gokoku Shrine
- Sō Shrine
- Sōja Daijingū

== Tōkai ==
=== Yamanashi ===
- Ichinomiya Asama Shrine
- Kitaguchi Hongu Fuji Asama Shrine
- Fuji Omuro Asama Shrine
- Takeda Shrine
- Fuji Yamashitamiya Komuro Asama Shrine
- Yamanashi Gokoku Shrine
- Kaina Shrine
- Miyamae-cho Hachimangu

=== Nagano ===
- Suwa Shrine
- Ikushimatarushima Shrine
- Togakushi Shrine
- Hotaka Shrine
- Nagano Gokoku Shrine
- Yohashira Shrine
- Fukashi Shrine
- Tenaga Shrine
- Takemizuwake Shrine
- Nyakuichi Ouji Shrine
- Shinano Omiya Shrine
- Iwa Shrine

=== Gifu ===
- Inaba Shrine
- Keta Wakamiya Shrine
- Minashi Shrine
- Nangū Taisha
- Yōrō Shrine
- Gifu Gokoku Shrine
- Hida Gokoku Shrine
- Nōhi Gokoku Shrine
- Sakurayama Hachimangu
- Nangū Otabi Shrine
- Hida Sōja
- Iijima Hachimangu,
- Shirakawa Hachimangu

=== Shizuoka ===
- Fujisan Hongū Sengen Taisha
- Iinoya-gū
- Mishima Taisha
- Shizuoka Sengen Shrine
- Oguni Shrine
- Izusan Shrine
- Kunōzan Tōshō-gū
- Akihasan Hongū Akiha Shrine
- Shirahama Shrine
- Shizuokaken Gokoku Shrine
- Yaizu Shrine
- Oi Shrine
- Gosha Suwa Shrine
- Kinomiya Shrine
- Fuji Rokusho Sengen Shrine
- Ōmikunitama Shrine

=== Aichi ===
- Aichi Prefecture Gokoku Shrine
- Atsuta Shrine
- Masumida Shrine
- Ōagata Shrine
- Rokusho Shrine (Okazaki)
- Tsushima Shrine
- Tagata Shrine
- Toga Shrine
- Owari Ōkunitama Shrine
- Wakamiya Hachiman Shrine
- Chiryu Shrine
- Mikawa Sōja
- Toyokawa Inari Shrine
- Nagakusa Tenjin Shrine

== Kinki ==
=== Mie ===
- Ise Shrine
- Kitabatake Shrine
- Saminaga Shrine
- Tado Shrine
- Tsubaki Ōkami Yashiro
- Yūki Shrine
- Aekuni Shrine
- Mie Prefecture Gokoku Shrine
- Sarutahiko Shrine
- Futami Okitama Shrine
- Inou Shrine
- Miyake Shrine
- Kokufu Shrine

=== Shiga ===
- Hiyoshi Taisha
- Omi Jingu
- Taga Taisha
- Takebe Taisha
- Tsukubusuma Shrine
- Mikami Shrine
- Himure Hachiman-gū
- Aga Shrine
- Shiga Prefecture Gokoku Shrine
- Nagahama Hachimangu

=== Kyoto ===
- Atago Shrine
- Fushimi Inari-taisha
- Heian Jingu
- Hirano Shrine
- Imamiya Shrine
- Iwashimizu Hachimangu
- Kamo Shrine
  - Kamo Wakeikazuchi Shrine (Kamigamo Shrine)
  - Kamo Mioya Shrine (Shimogamo Shrine)
- Kibune Shrine
- Kitano Tenmangu
- Kono Shrine
- Kyoto Ryozen Gokoku Shrine
- Matsunoo Taisha
- Nishiki Tenmangū
- Ōharano Shrine
- Saginomori Shrine
- Shiramine Jingū
- Tsukiyomi Shrine
- Yasaka Shrine
- Yoshida Shrine
- Goō Shrine
- Toyokuni Shrine (Kyoto)
- Umenomiya Shrine
- Nashinoki Shrine
- Izumo-daijingū
- Kenkun Shrine
- Sō Shrine
- Hinumanai Shrine

=== Osaka ===
- Abeno Shrine
- Hattori Tenjin Shrine
- Hiraoka Shrine
- Ikasuri Shrine
- Ikukunitama Shrine
- Imamiya Ebisu Shrine
- Kōzu-gū
- Minase Shrine
- Mitami Shrine
- Ōsaka Tenmangū Shrine
- Ōtori taisha
- Osaka Gokoku Shrine
- Sakurai Shrine (Sakai)
- Shijōnawate Shrine
- Sumiyoshi Taisha
- Tsuboi Hachimangū
- Tsunashiki Tenjin Shrine
- Shikiagatanushi Shrine
- Nanba Shrine
- Izumi Inoue Shrine
- Onji Shrine

=== Hyōgo ===
- Izanagi Shrine
- Hirota Shrine
- Ikuta Shrine
- Izushi Shrine
- Koshikiiwa Shrine
- Mefu Shrine
- Minatogawa Shrine
- Nagata Shrine
- Nishinomiya Shrine
- Sumiyoshi Shrine
- Watatsumi Shrine
- Iwa Shrine
- Itatehyōzu Shrine
- Hiromine Shrine
- Oishi Shrine
- Tada Shrine
- Hyogo Himeji Gokoku Shrine
- Hyogo Prefecture Kobe Gokoku Shrine
- Keta Shrine
- Jūichimyōjin Shrine

=== Nara ===
- Himuro Shrine
- Ikoma Shrine
- Isonokami Jingu
- Kashihara Jingu
- Kasuga Taisha
- Oomiwa Shrine
- Tamukeyama Hachiman Shrine
- Yoshino Mikumari Shrine
- Ōyamato Shrine
- Hirose Shrine
- Niukawakami Shrine
  - Niukawakami Upper Shrine
  - Niukawakami Lower Shrine
- Tatsuta Shrine
- Tanzan Shrine
- Isonozatakumushitama Shrine
- Nara Gokoku Shrine

=== Wakayama ===
- Hinokuma Shrine
- Kamayama Shrine
- Kumano Three Shrines (Kumano Sanzan)
  - Kumano Hayatama Taisha
  - Kumano Hongū Taisha
  - Kumano Nachi Taisha
- Niutsuhime Shrine
- Itakiso Shrine
- Tokei Shrine
- Fumori Shrine

== Chūgoku ==
=== Tottori ===
- Shitori Shrine
- Ube shrine
- Nawa Shrine
- Ōgamiyama Shrine
- Kokuchōri Shrine

=== Shimane ===
- Hinomisaki Shrine
- Miho Shrine
- Yaegaki Shrine
- Izumo Taisha
- Kumano Taisha
- Susa Shrine
- Mizuwakasu Shrine
- Mononobe Shrine
- Sada Shrine
- Hirahama Hachimangu
- Taikodani Inari Shrine
- Matsue Gokoku Shrine
- Hamada Gokoku Shrine
- Rokusho Shrine
- Ikan Shrine
- Tamawakasumikoto Shrine (Sōja-daimyōjin)
- Araki Shrine
- Suga-jinja

=== Okayama ===
- Kibitsu Shrine
- Kibitsuhiko Shrine
- Nakayama Shrine
- Saijo Inari
- Shiro Shrine
- Tsurusaki Shrine
- Yuga Shrine
- Okayama Gokoku Shrine
- Ani Shrine
- Mimasaka Sōja-gū
- Bizen-no-Kuni Sōjagū
- Bitchū-no-kuni Sōja-gū

=== Hiroshima ===
- Fukuyama Hachimangū
- Hiroshima Gokoku Shrine
- Itsukushima Shrine
- Sakakiyama Shrine
- Hayatani Shrine
- Nunakuma Shrine
- Kameyama Shrine
- Hijiyama Shrine
- Bingo Gokoku Shrine
- Ono Shrine
- Take Shrine

=== Yamaguchi ===
- Akama Shrine
- Sumiyoshi Shrine
- Hikoshima Hachimangu
- Kameyama Hachimangū
- Yamaguchi Prefecture Gokoku Shrine
- Toyosaka Shrine
- Noda Shrine
- Tamanooya Shrine
- Iminomiya Shrine
- Hōfu Tenmangū
- Kotozaki Hachimangu
- Saba Shrine
- Wakamiya Shrine

== Shikoku ==
=== Tokushima ===
- Inbe Shrine
- Ōasahiko Shrine
- Tsunomine Shrine
- Tokushima Gokoku Shrine
- Hachiman Sōsha Ryo Shrine
- Omiwa Shrine

=== Kagawa ===
- Tamura Shrine
- Kotohira Gu
- Kagawa Gokoku Shrine
- Sōja Shrine

=== Ehime ===
- Isaniwa Shrine
- Isono Shrine
- Ishizuchi Shrine
- Izumo Taisha Matsuyama Shrine
- Mishima Shrine
- Taga Shrine
- Yu Shrine
- Ōyamazumi Shrine
- Warei Shrine
- Iyozu Hikomei Shrine
- Ehime Prefecture Gokoku Shrine
- Ikanashi Shrine

=== Kōchi ===
- Tosa Shrine
- Ushioe Tenmangu shrine
- Kochi Gokoku Shrine
- Yamauchi Shrine
- Tosa Kokubun-ji

== Kyūshū and Okinawa ==
=== Fukuoka ===
- Dazaifu Tenman-gū
- Furogu Shrine
- Hakozakigu
- Hikosan Shrine
- Itouzu Hachiman Shrine
- Kamado Shrine
- Kashii Shrine
- Kōra taisha
- Kosou Hachimangu
- Kurume Suitengu
- Kushida Shrine
- Mekari Shrine
- Miyajidake Shrine
- Munakata Taisha
  - Hetsu-gū
  - Nakatsu-gū
  - Okitsu-gū
- Mioya Shrine
- Noso Hachimangu
- Otomi Shrine
- Shikaumi Shrine
- Sugawara Shrine
- Sumiyoshi Shrine (Fukuoka)
- Takami Shrine
- Takasu Shrine
- Tanabata Shrine
- Terumo Shrine
- Tobata Hachimangu
- Tokaebisu Shrine
- Umi Hachimangu
- Wakamatsu Ebisu Shrine
- Washio Atago Shrine
- Fukuoka Prefecture Gokoku Shrine
- Kōra taisha
- Sōsha Hachiman-gū

=== Saga ===
- Araho Shrine
- Chiriku Hachiman Shrine
- Hoto Shrine
- Ise Shrine
- Kushidagu
- Saga Shrine
- Tashima Shrine
- Tōzan Shrine
- Yūtoku Inari Shrine
- Saga Gokoku Shrine

=== Nagasaki ===
- Sanno Shrine
- Suwa Shrine
- Sumiyoshi Shrine (Iki City)
- Kaijin Shrine
- Kameyama Hachimangu Shrine
- Nagasaki Gokoku Shrine
- Kō Shrine

=== Kumamoto ===
- Aoi Aso Shrine
- Aso Shrine
- Fujisaki Hachimangu
- Kato Shrine
- Kengun Shrine
- Kikuchi Shrine
- Heitate Shrine
- Hikino Shrine
- Takahashi Inari Shrine
- Yatsushiro-gū
- Kumamoto Gokoku Shrine
- Kitaoka Shrine

=== Ōita ===
- Komo Shrine
- Usa Jingu
- Sasamuta Shrine
- Yusuhara Hachimangū
- Hachiman Asami Shrine
- Kasuga Shrine
- Oita Gokoku Shrine

=== Miyazaki ===
- Amanoiwato Shrine
- Aoshima Shrine
- Miyazaki Jingū
- Mikado Shrine
- Mukabaki Shrine
- Takachiho Shrine
- Tsuno Shrine
- Udo Jingū
- Kanhashira-gū
- Sano Shrine
- Miyazaki Gokoku Shrine
- Tsuma Shrine

=== Kagoshima ===
- Hirakiki Shrine
- Kagoshima Shrine
- Terukuni Shrine
- Kirishima Shrine
- Nitta Shrine
- Kagoshima Prefecture Gokoku Shrine
- Haraido Shrine

=== Okinawa ===
- Naminoue Shrine

== See also ==
- List of Jingū
- List of Shinto shrines in Taiwan
- List of Shinto shrines in the United States
- Nan'yō Shrine (Palau)
- Chokusaisha
- Twenty-Two Shrines (二十二社, Nijūni-sha)

== General references ==
- Ponsonby-Fane, Richard Arthur Brabazon. (1962) Studies in Shinto and Shrines. Kyoto: Ponsonby Memorial Society. OCLC 3994492.
- Ponsonby-Fane, Richard Arthur Brabazon (1963). Vicissitudes of Shinto. Kyoto: Ponsonby Memorial Society. OCLC 36655.
