= Kume (disambiguation) =

Kume may refer to:

== People with the surname ==
- Ai Kume (久米 愛, 1911–1976), Japanese lawyer
- Hiroshi Kume (久米 宏) (born 1944), Japanese television and radio presenter
- Kume Keiichiro (久米 桂一郎) (1866–1934), Japanese painter
- Kume Kunitake (久米 邦武) (1839–1931), Japanese historian
- Masao Kume (久米 正雄) (1891–1952), Japanese playwright, novelist and poet
- Mike Kume (1926–2012), American baseball player
- Naoko Kume (久米 直子, born 1963), Japanese swimmer
- Sanshiro Kume (久米 三四郎) (1926–2009), Japanese radiochemist
- Sayuri Kume (久米小百合) (born 1958), Japanese singer-songwriter
- Tadashi Kume (久米 是志) (born 1931), Japanese former president of Honda Motor Co., Ltd.
- Takasuke Kume (久米 鷹介) (born 1985), Japanese mixed martial artist
- Kume no Wakame (久米 若女 or 久米 若売) (died 780), Japanese muraji

== Places ==
- Kume Island (久米島), an island, part of the Okinawa Islands
- Kume, Okayama (久米町), a town located in Kume District, Okayama, Japan
- Kume District, Okayama (久米郡), a district located in Okayama Prefecture, Japan
- Kumejima, Okinawa (久米島町), a town located in Shimajiri District, Okinawa, Japan
- Kumemura (久米村), a center of Chinese culture located in Naha, Okinawa, Japan
- Kumenan, Okayama (久米南町), a town located in Kume District, Okayama, Japan

== Other uses ==
- Kume (crab), a genus of crabs in the family Portunidae
- Kume no Heinai-dō (久米平内堂), a small folk shrine located in Asakusa, Tokyo, Japan
- Kumeyaay people, Native American people of the extreme southwestern United States and northwest Mexico
