= List of cultural properties of Japan – paintings (Miyazaki) =

This list is of the cultural properties of Japan designated in the category of paintings (絵画, kaiga) for the Prefecture of Miyazaki.

== National Cultural Properties ==
As of 1 July 2019, zero properties have been designated Important Cultural Properties as being of national significance.

== Prefectural Cultural Properties ==
As of 1 May 2019, four properties have been designated at a prefectural level.

Property	Date	Municipality	Ownership	Comments	Image	Dimensions	Coordinates	Ref.
Kannon Bosatsu, ita-e 板絵著色観音菩薩御正体 ita-e choshoku Kannon Bosatsu mi-shōtai	before 1401	Misato	Mikado Jinja	panel of Japanese cedar showing a rock standing out of the waves, topped with a lotus pedestal, on which Kannon is seated, holding a lotus flower in his left hand; stylistically the painting resembles those of Song China during the Kamakura period; on the reverse is an ink inscription of 1401 identifying the figure as Mikado Daimyōjin			32°23′10″N 131°19′51″E	
Korean Tiger Hunt, byōbu 高麗虎狩図屏風; Kōrai tora-gari zu byōbu	early Edo period	Miyakonojō	Miyakonojō Shimazu Folklore Center (島津伝承館)	pair of six-fold screens; with a letter from Toyotomi Hideyoshi expressing his desire for a tiger; the hunt took place in March 1595; attributed to Kei Jiku (永井慶竺)		358 centimetres (11 ft 9 in) by 158 centimetres (5 ft 2 in)	31°43′05″N 131°04′06″E	
Scenes around Nobeoka Castle, byōbu 延岡城下図屏風; Nobeoka-jōka zu byōbu	late C17	Nobeoka	kept at Naitō Memorial Museum	pair of six-fold screens		300.5 centimetres (9 ft 10.3 in) by 134 centimetres (4 ft 5 in)	32°34′54″N 131°39′31″E	
Ceiling painting dedicated by Itō Sukeharu, inscribed in ink 伊東祐青奉納墨書天井画; Itō Sukeharu hōno bokusho tenjōga	1575	Kunitomi	Yakushi-ji (薬師寺)	two panels with a dragon, with an ink dedication on the reverse		264 centimetres (8 ft 8 in) by 264 centimetres (8 ft 8 in)	32°02′36″N 131°15′03″E	

== See also ==
- Cultural Properties of Japan
- List of National Treasures of Japan (paintings)
- Japanese painting
- List of Historic Sites of Japan (Miyazaki)
