= Atago Shrine =

Atago Shrine (愛宕神社, Atago Jinja) may refer to:

- Atago Shrine (Kyoto)
- Atago Shrine (Sendai)
- Atago Shrine (Tokyo)
- Atago Shrine, once located on Atagoyama Kofun, Gyōdo, Saitama Prefecture
- Atago Shrine, on Atagoyama Kofun (Mito), Ibaraki Prefecture

== See also ==
- Atago Gongen
