= Asahikawa shrine =

Shinto shrine in Asashikawa, Hokkaido, Japan

Coordinates: 43.7693°N 142.4437°E

Asahikawa Shrine (旭川神社, Asahikawa jinja) is a Shinto shrine located in Asahikawa, Hokkaido. Established in 1893, it is dedicated to the kami Amaterasu (天照皇大御神) and Konohanasakuyahime no mikoto (木花開耶姫命). Its annual festival is on August 15.

== See also ==
- List of Shinto shrines in Hokkaidō
