= Sakurai Shrine (Sakai) =

Shrine in Sakai, Osaka Prefecture, Japan

Coordinates: 34.4852°N 135.5063°E

- 桜井神社
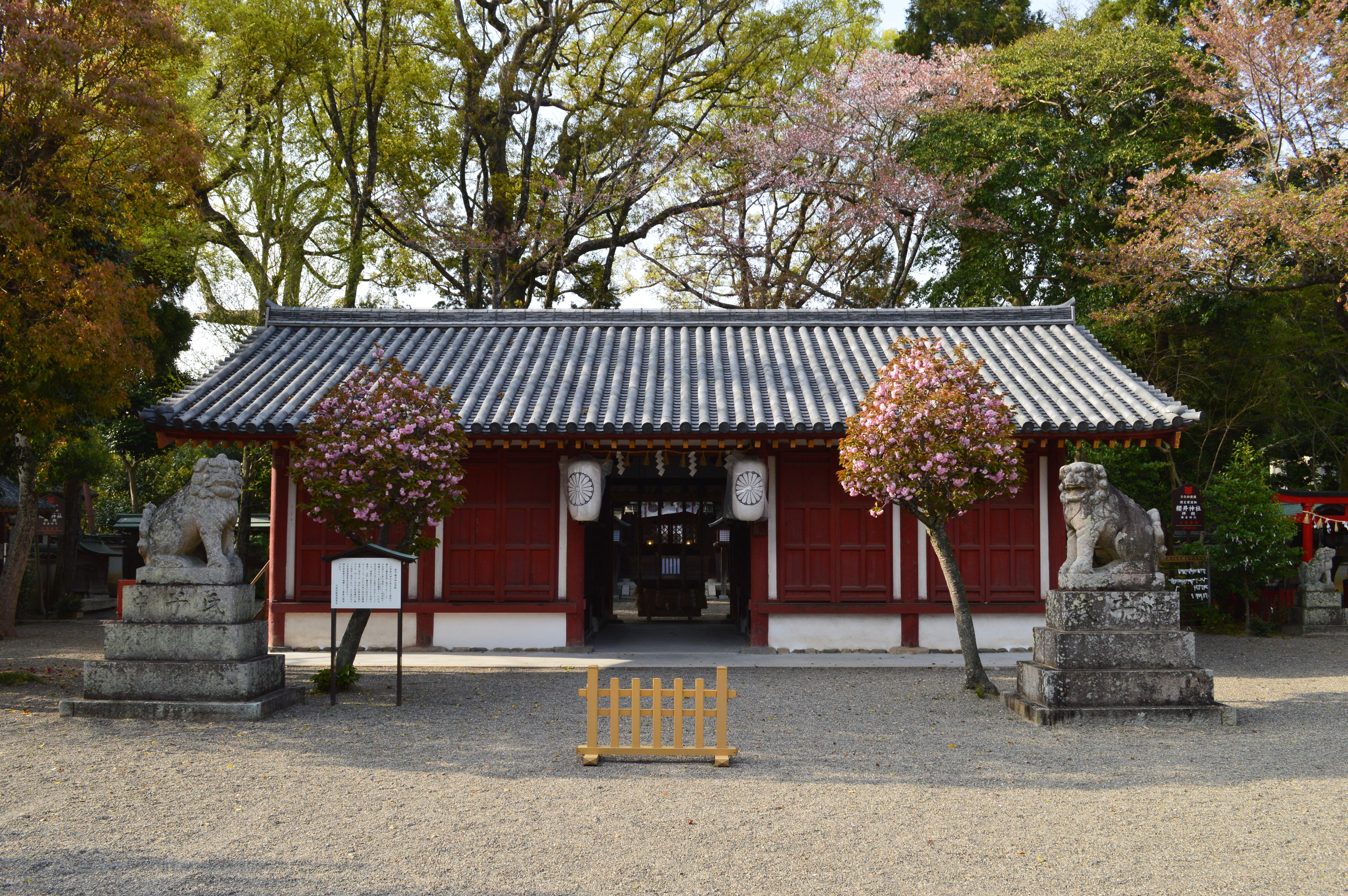
- Worship Hall (National Treasure)

Religion
- Affiliation: Shinto
- Deity: Emperor Ōjin, Emperor Chūai, Empress Jingū
- Festival: First Sunday of October
- Type: Former Ken-sha

Location
- Location: 645 Katakura, Minami Ward, Sakai, Osaka 590-0121
- Country: Japan
- Interactive map of Sakurai Shrine

Sakurai Shrine (桜井神社, Sakurai jinja, also 櫻井神社) is a Shinto shrine located in Sakai, Osaka Prefecture, Japan. It was founded at an unknown date and holds its annual festival on the first Sunday in October. It enshrines Emperor Ōjin, Emperor Chūai, and Empress Jingū as kami. The oratory (拝殿, haiden) is designated as the only Japanese National Treasure in Sakai City.

== See also ==
- List of Shinto shrines in Japan
