= Watatsu Shrine =

Shinto shrine in Niigata Prefecture, Japan

- 度津神社
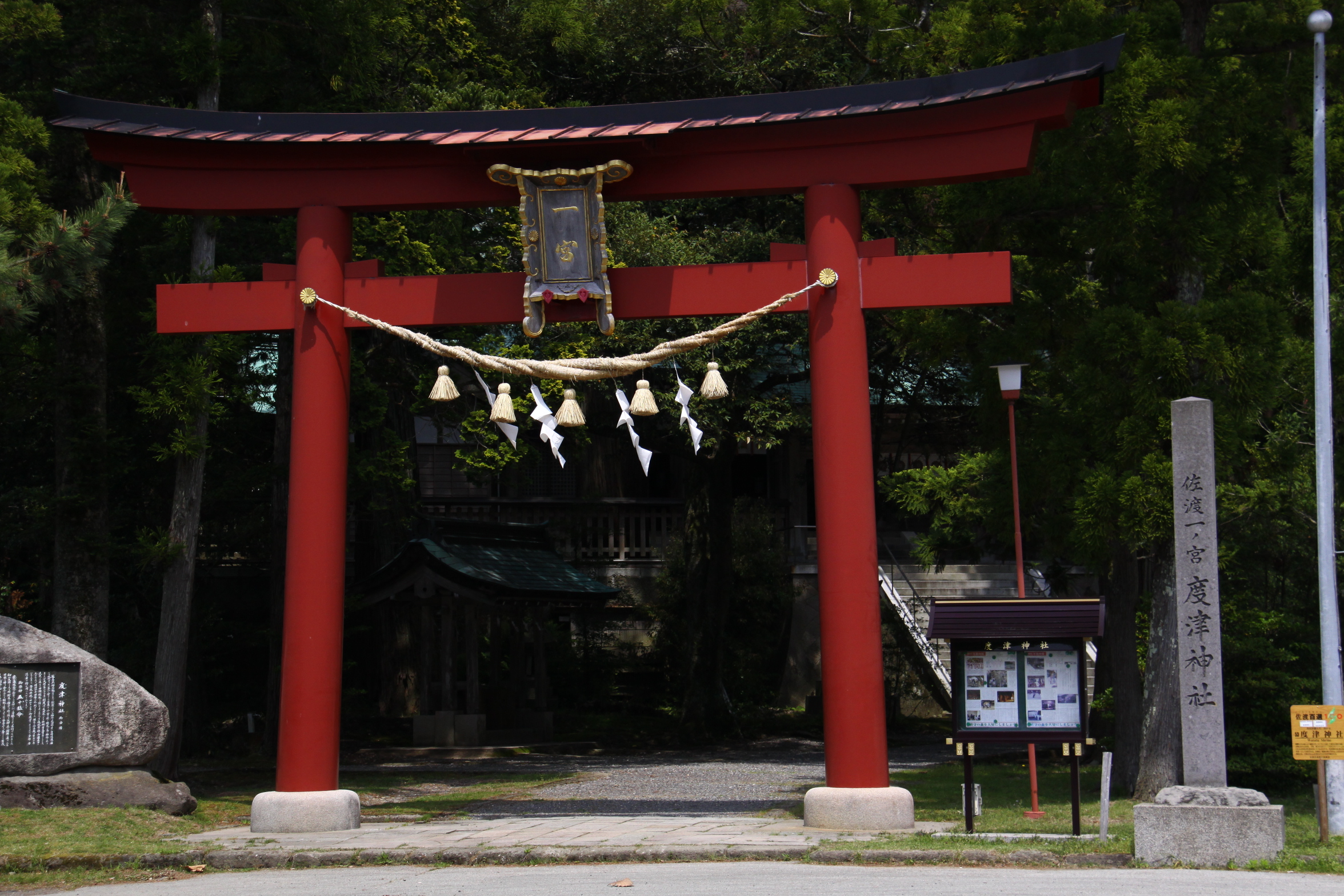
- Torii at Watatsu Shrine

- Watasu Jinja Watatsu Shrine (Japan)

Religion
- Affiliation: Shinto
- Deity: Isonotakeru no mikoto
- Festival: April 23

Location
- Location: 550-4 Hamochiiioka, Sado-shi, Niigata-ken
- Interactive map of Watatsu Shrine
- Coordinates: 37°51′36.9″N 138°19′50.3″E

Watatsu Shrine (度津神社, Watatsu-jinja) is a Shinto shrine in the Hamochiiioka neighborhood of the city of Sado, Niigata. It is the ichinomiya of former Sado Province. The main festival of the shrine is held annually on the April 23.

== Enshrined kami ==
The primary kami enshrined at Watatsu Jinja are:

- Isonotakeru no mikoto (五十猛命), god shipbuilding and sailing.
- Oyahitsuhime no mikoto (大屋津姫命), sister of Isonotakeru
- Tsumatsuhime no mikoto (抓津姫命), sister of Isonotakeru

== History ==
Located on the island of Sado in the Sea of Japan, the history of Watatsu Shrine is uncertain, as the shrine was completely destroyed by a flood during the Kan'ei era (1624-1643) of the Edo Period. According to shrine tradition, it was founded by the semi-legendary Kofun period Emperor Chūai (reigned 192–200 AD). Its name appears in the Engishiki records compiled in 927 AD, but only as a minor shrine. It was destroyed by a flood in 1470, and rebuilt by the Honma clan, who were rulers of Sado island, in 1472. The shrine appears to have been destroyed repeatedly by floods in 1493, 1533 and 1593, and was merged in 1493 with a nearby Hachiman shrine. It is only mentioned as an ichinomiya in 1678 with the publication the Shokoku Ichinomiya Pilgrimage Record (諸国一宮巡詣記, Shokoku Ichinomiya Pilgrimage Record) by Shinto scholar Tachibana Mitsuyoshi. Following the Meiji restoration, with the establishment of State Shinto in 1872, the shrine was classified as a National shrine, 3rd rank (国幣小社, kokuhei-shōsha).

The enshrined kami is Isonotakeru no mikoto (五十猛命), the son of Susanoo-no-Mikoto, who is said to have taught people shipbuilding and how to use ships, and his two sisters Oyahitsuhime no mikoto (大屋津姫命) and Tsumatsuhime no mikoto (抓津姫命)

Each year in late-April, horseback archery (yabusame) takes place at the branch shrine in the town of Hamochi.

The shrine is located about 15 minutes by car from Ogi Port.

== Gallery ==
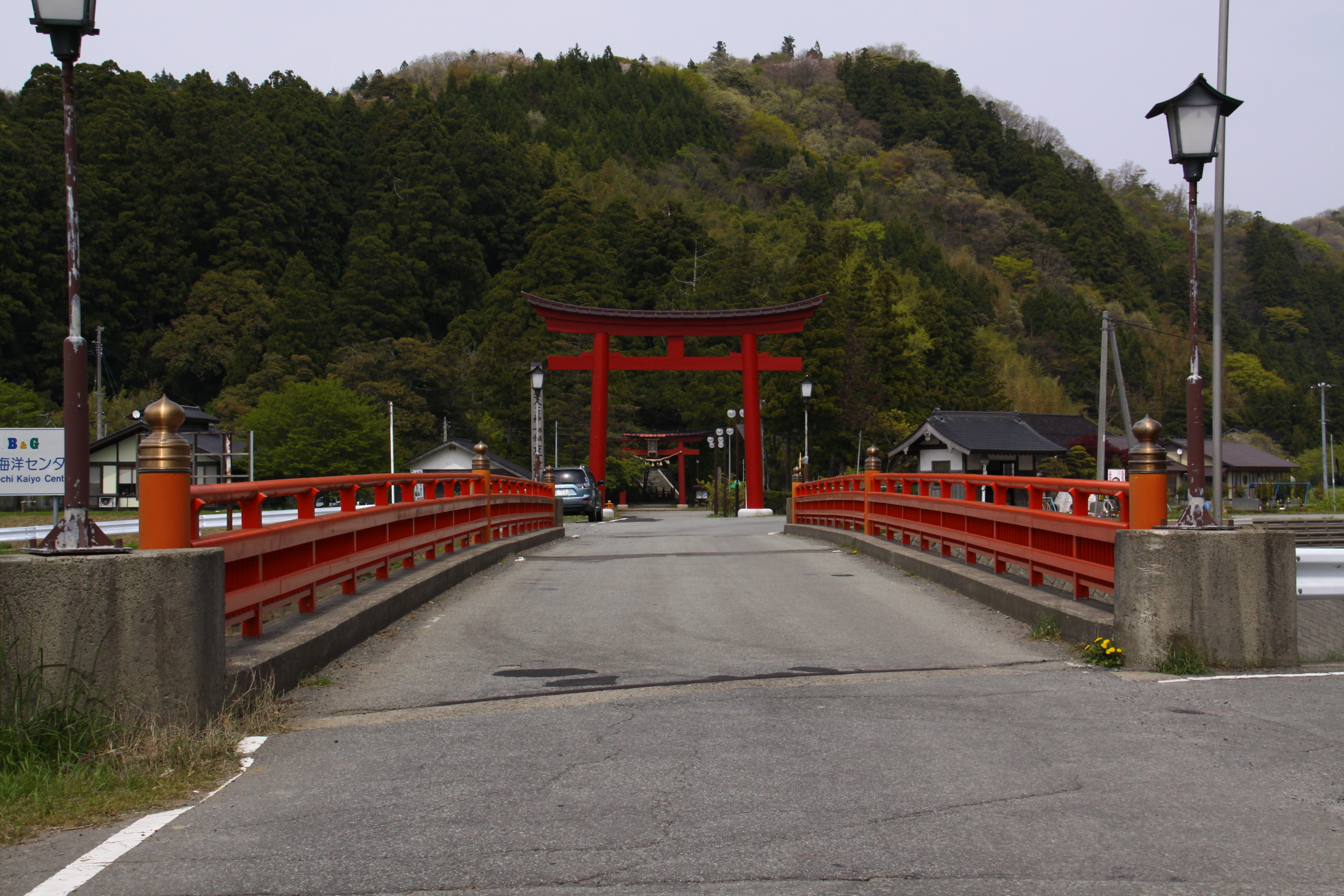
Torii

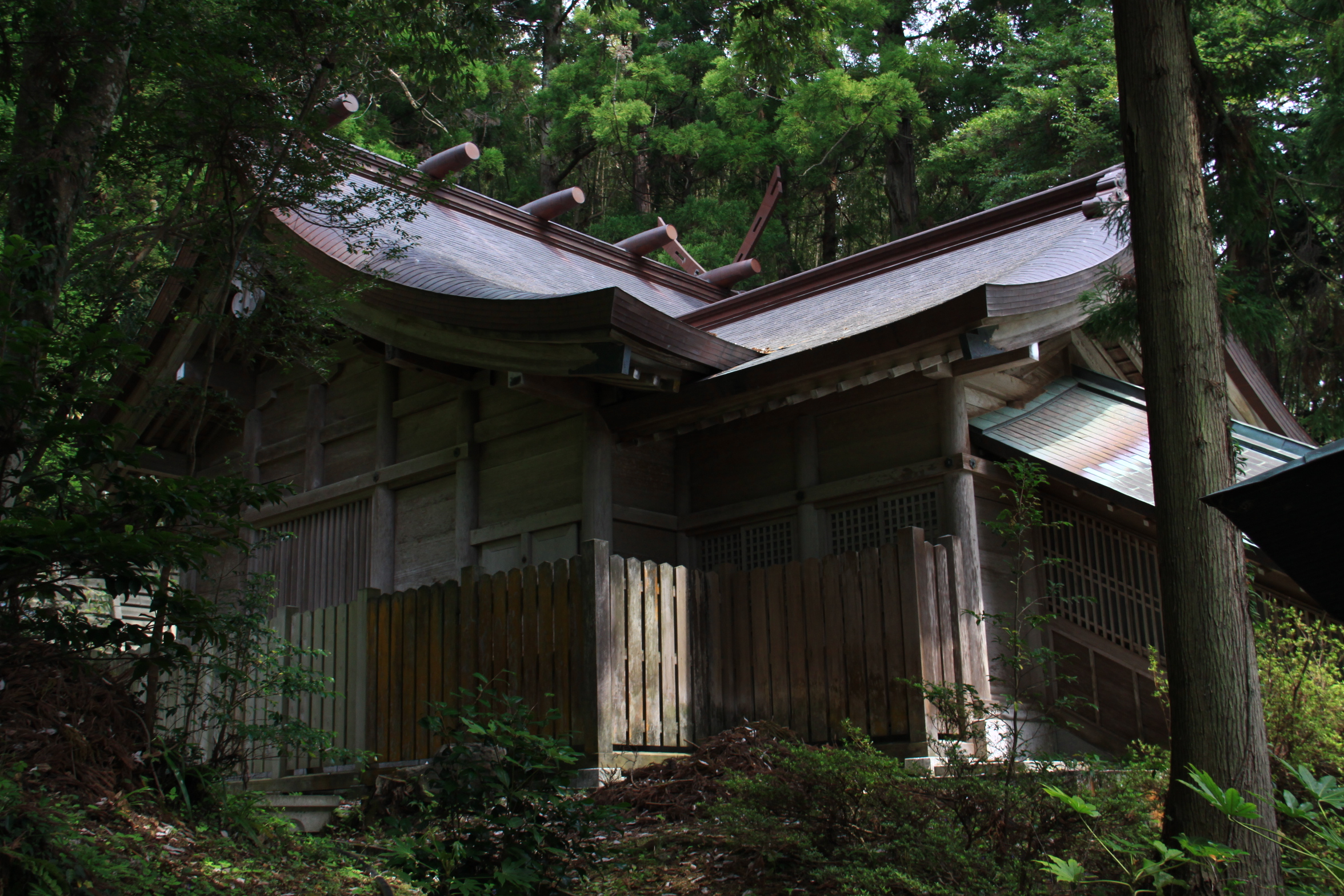
Honden

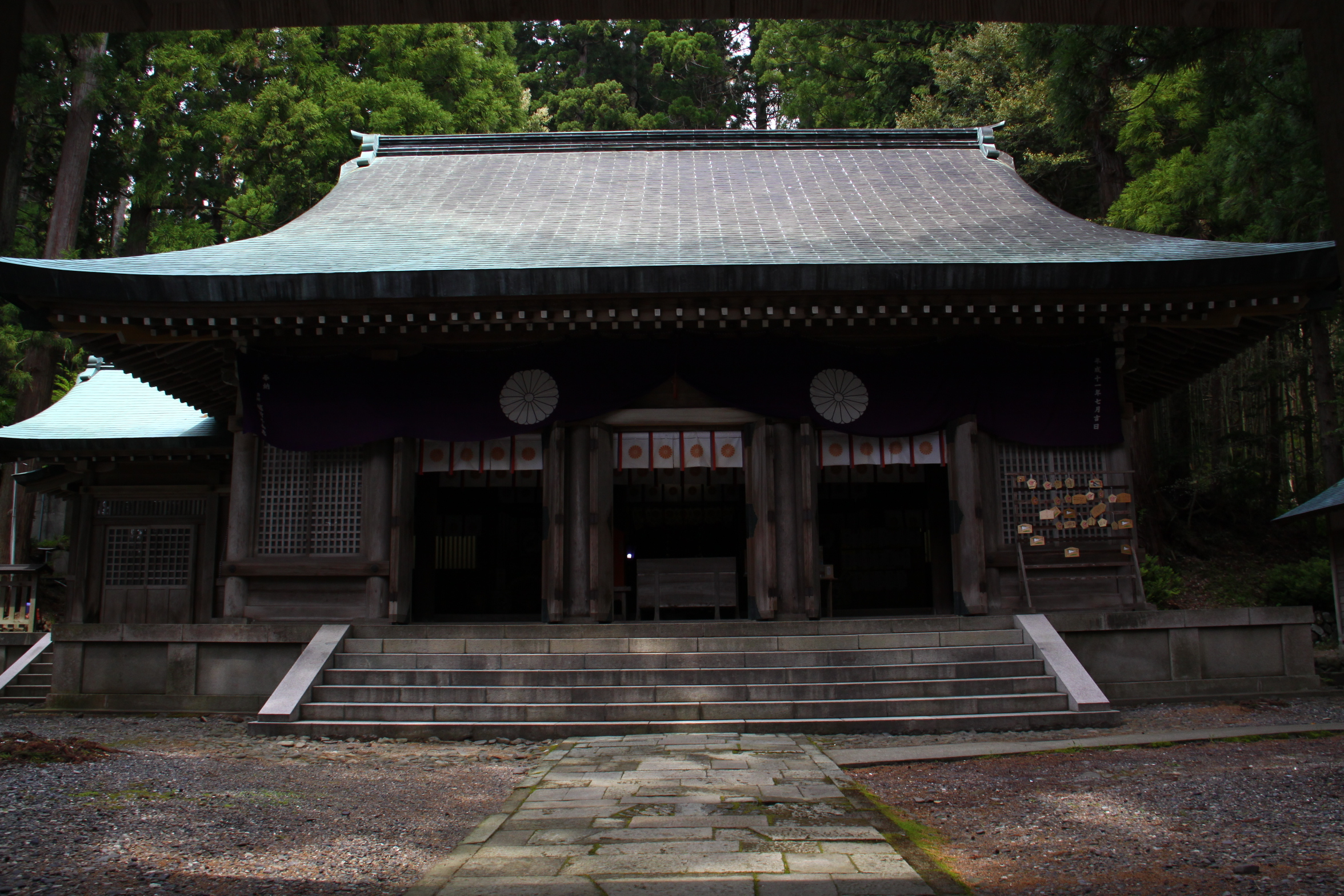
Heiden

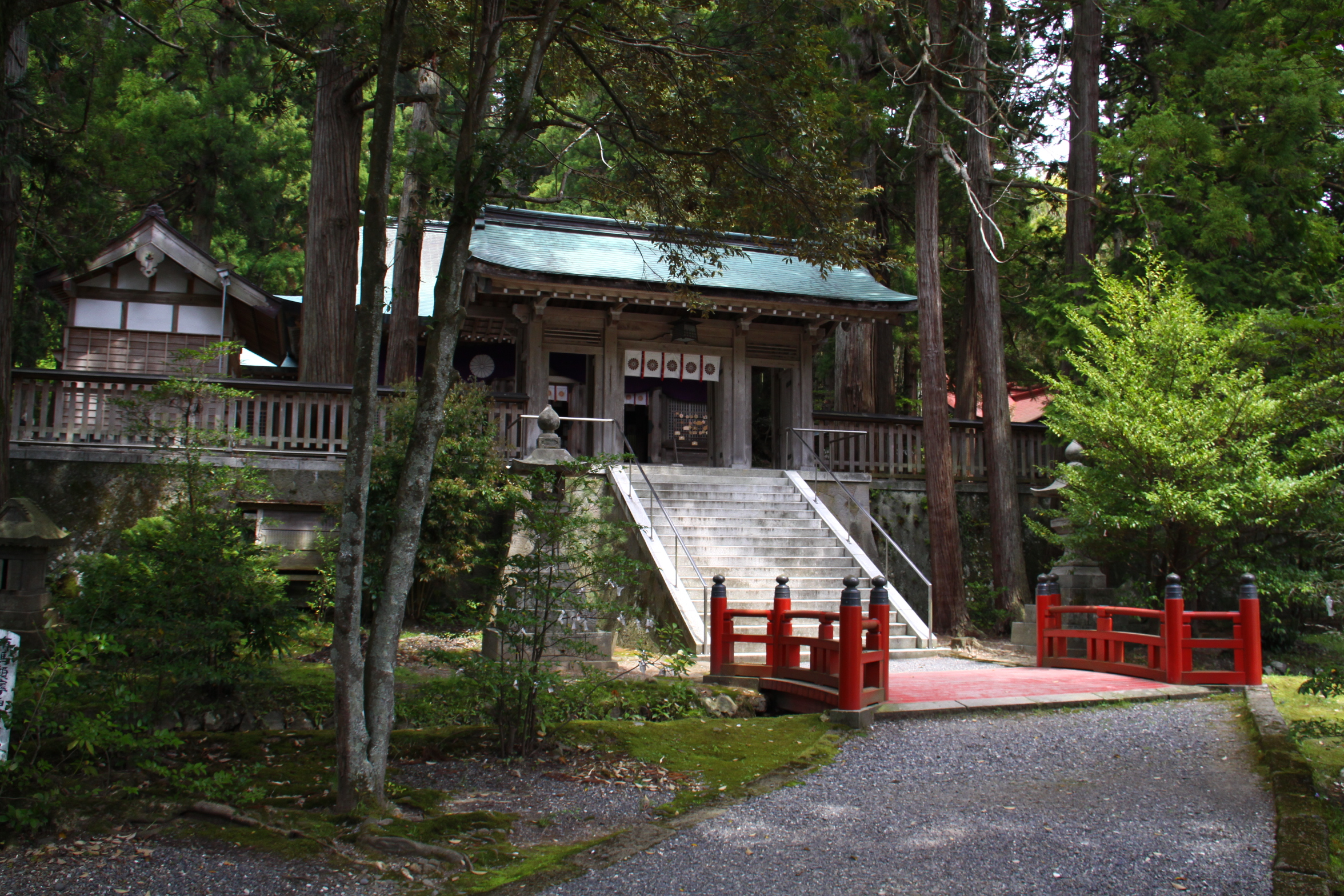
Gate

== See also ==
- List of Shinto shrines in Japan
- Ichinomiya
