= Nakanotake Shrine =

Shrine in Shimonita, Gunma Prefecture, Japan

Coordinates: 36.2838°N 138.7374°E

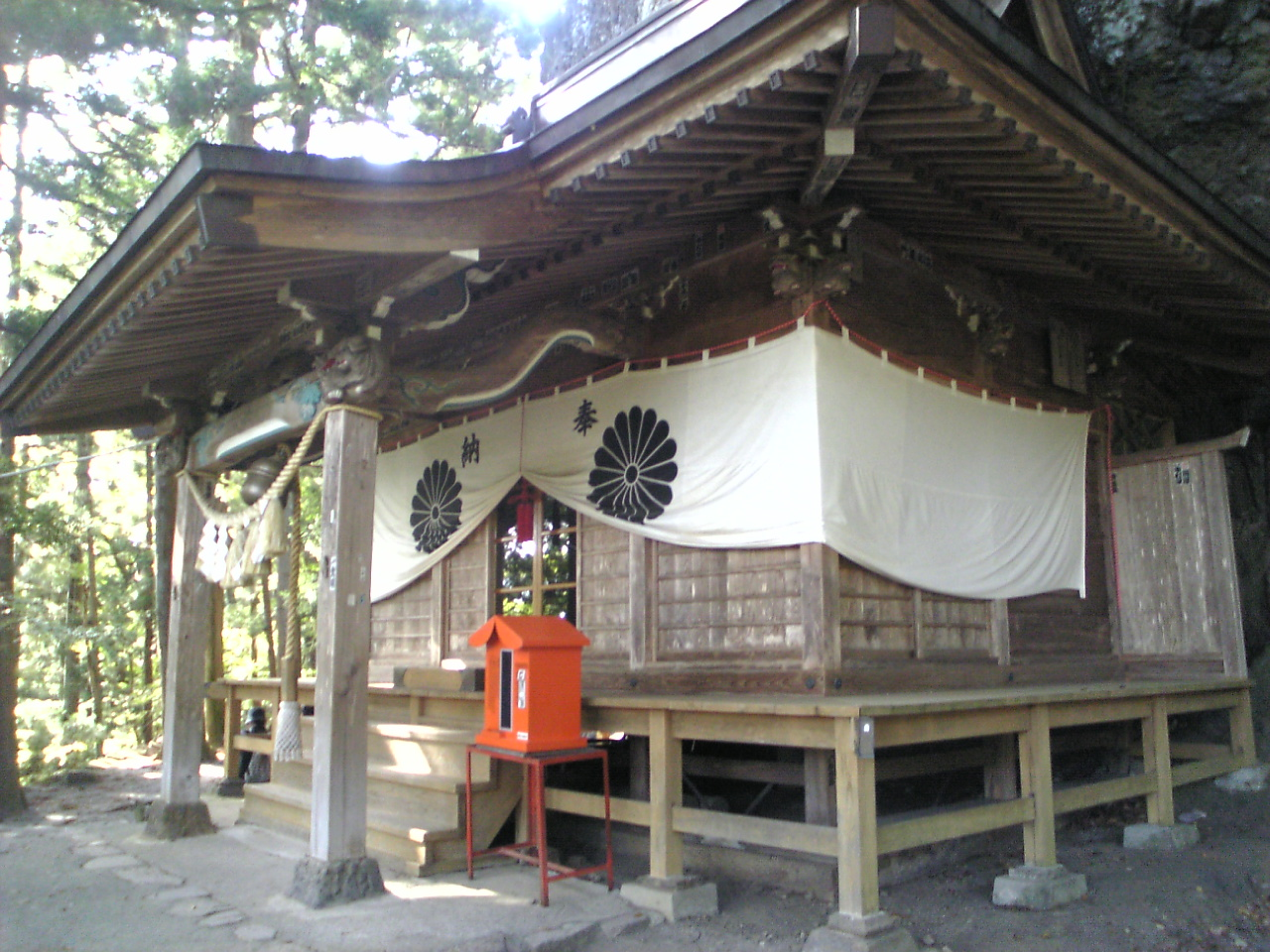

Nakanotake Shrine (中之嶽神社, Nakanotake jinja) is a Shinto shrine located in Shimonita, Gunma Prefecture, Japan. It enshrines Yamato Takeru no mikoto (日本武尊) as its main kami. It was established by Emperor Kinmei and holds its annual festival on October 15.

== See also ==
- List of Shinto shrines in Japan
