= Uramachi Shinmeigū =

Shinto shrine

Coordinates: 40°49′16″N 140°45′04″E

Uramachi Shinmeigū (浦町神明宮, Uramachi Shinmeigū) is a Shinto shrine located in Aomori, Aomori Prefecture, Japan. It enshrines three major kami: Amaterasu (天照大神), Omiyanome no kami (大宮能賣神), and Sarutahiko Ōkami (猿田彦神). The shrine is located at 〒030-0823 Aomori-ken, Aomori-shi, Hashimoto 2-7-8. Its major annual festival is on June 16.

== See also ==
- List of Shinto shrines in Japan
