= Ōta Shrine =

Shinto shrine in Hokkaido, Japan

Coordinates: 42°16′03″N 139°46′53″E

Ōta Jinja (太田神社)

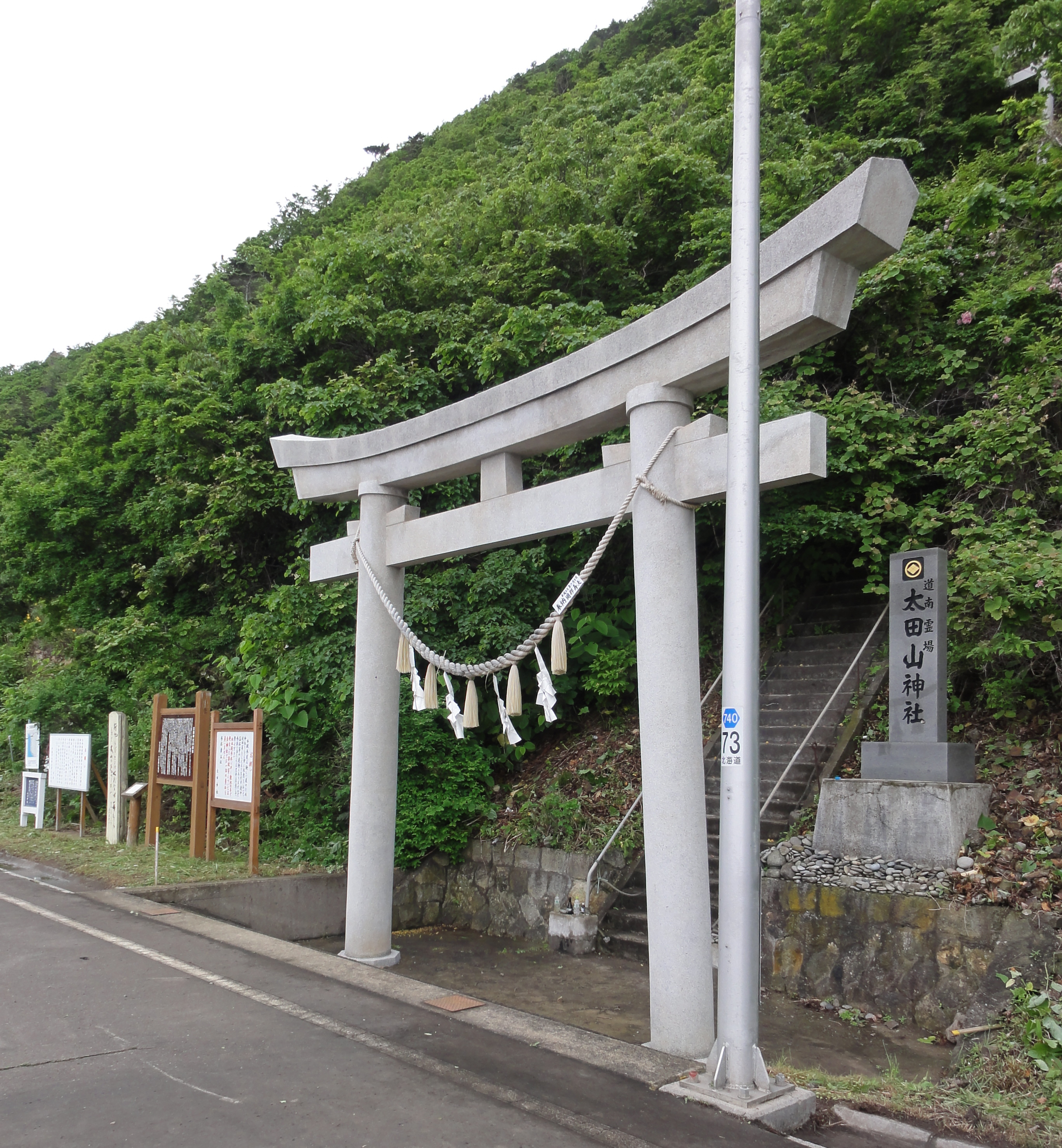
Entrance to Otasan Shrine

is a Shinto shrine in Setana, Hokkaidō, Japan. Founded in 1441–3, its buildings are scattered over the steep mountainside overlooking the Sea of Japan.[1][2][3][4]

== See also ==
- List of Shinto shrines in Hokkaidō
