= Tsubonuma Hachiman Shrine =

Shrine in Sendai, Miyagi Prefecture, Japan

Tsubonuma Hachiman Shrine (坪沼八幡神社, Tsubonuma Hachiman jinja) is a Shinto shrine located in Sendai, Miyagi Prefecture, Japan. It is a Hachiman shrine, dedicated to the kami Hachiman as well as to Emperor Ojin, Empress Jingū, Emperor Chūai, and Takenouchi no Sukune.

The shrine's address is 〒982-0231 Miyagi, Sendai, Taihaku Ward, Tsubonuma, Tatemaehigashi−69.

== See also ==
- List of Shinto shrines in Japan
- Hachiman shrine
