= Saginomori Shrine =

Shrine in Kyoto, Japan

Saginomori Shrine 鷺森神社(さぎのもりじんじゃ)
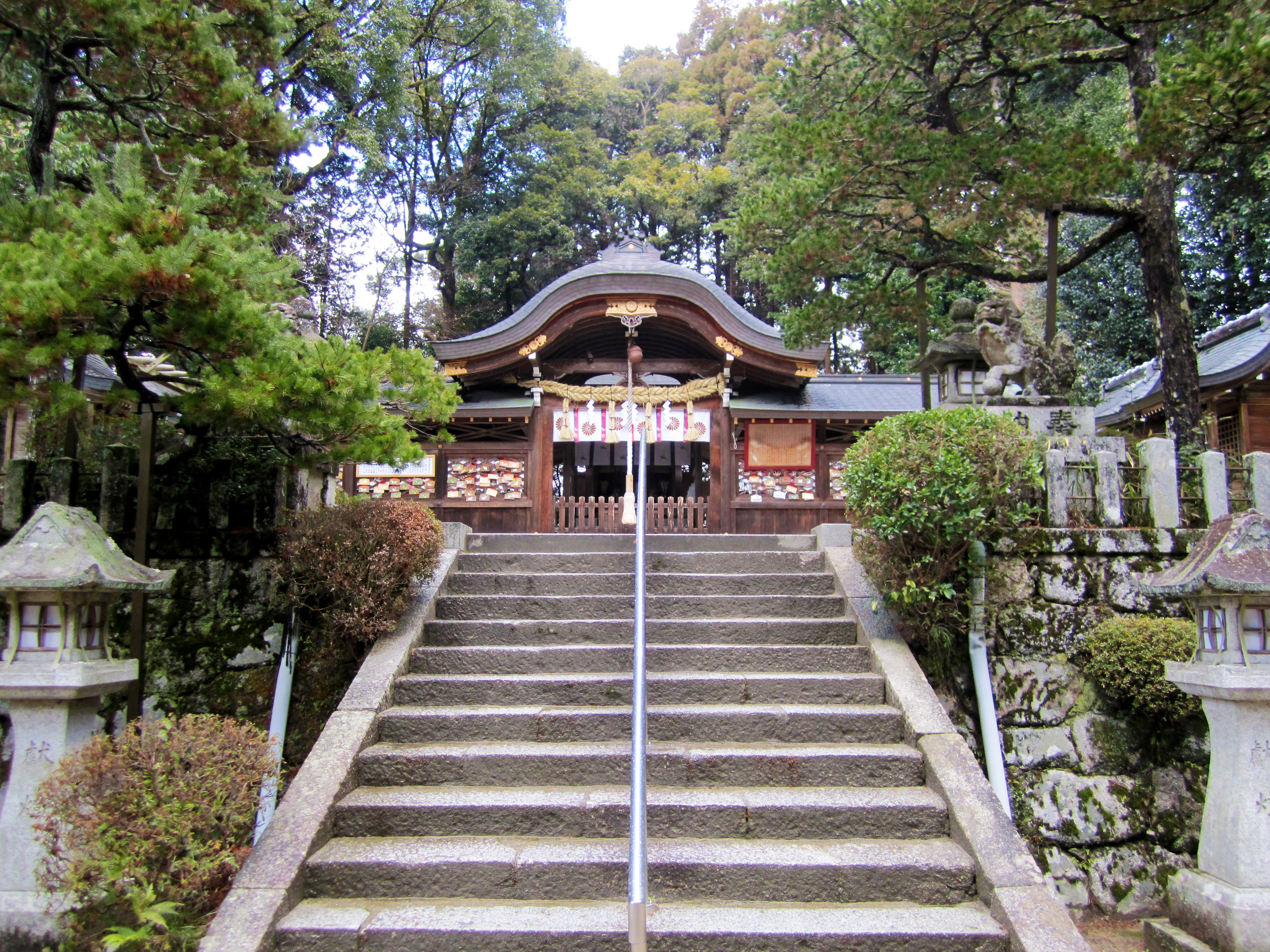

- Location within Japan

Religion
- Affiliation: Shinto
- Deity: Susanoo （Gozu Tennō、Suda Tennō）

Location
- Location: 16 Shugakuin Miyanowakicho, Sakyo Ward, Kyoto, 606-8061, Japan
- Interactive map of Saginomori Shrine 鷺森神社(さぎのもりじんじゃ)
- Coordinates: 35°2′58.43″N 135°47′54.69″E

Saginomori Shrine (鷺森神社, Saginomori Jinja, Sagimori Jinja) is a Shinto shrine located in Kyōto, Kyōto Prefecture, Japan. It is dedicated to the divinity Susanoo / Gozu Tennō (牛頭天王) under the name Suda Tennō (鬚咫天王). It is such a shrine of the Gion faith.

== See also ==
- List of Shinto shrines in Japan
