= Kushihiki Hachimangū =

Shrine in Hachinohe, Aomori, Japan

Coordinates: 40.4900°N 141.4348°E

- 櫛引八幡宮
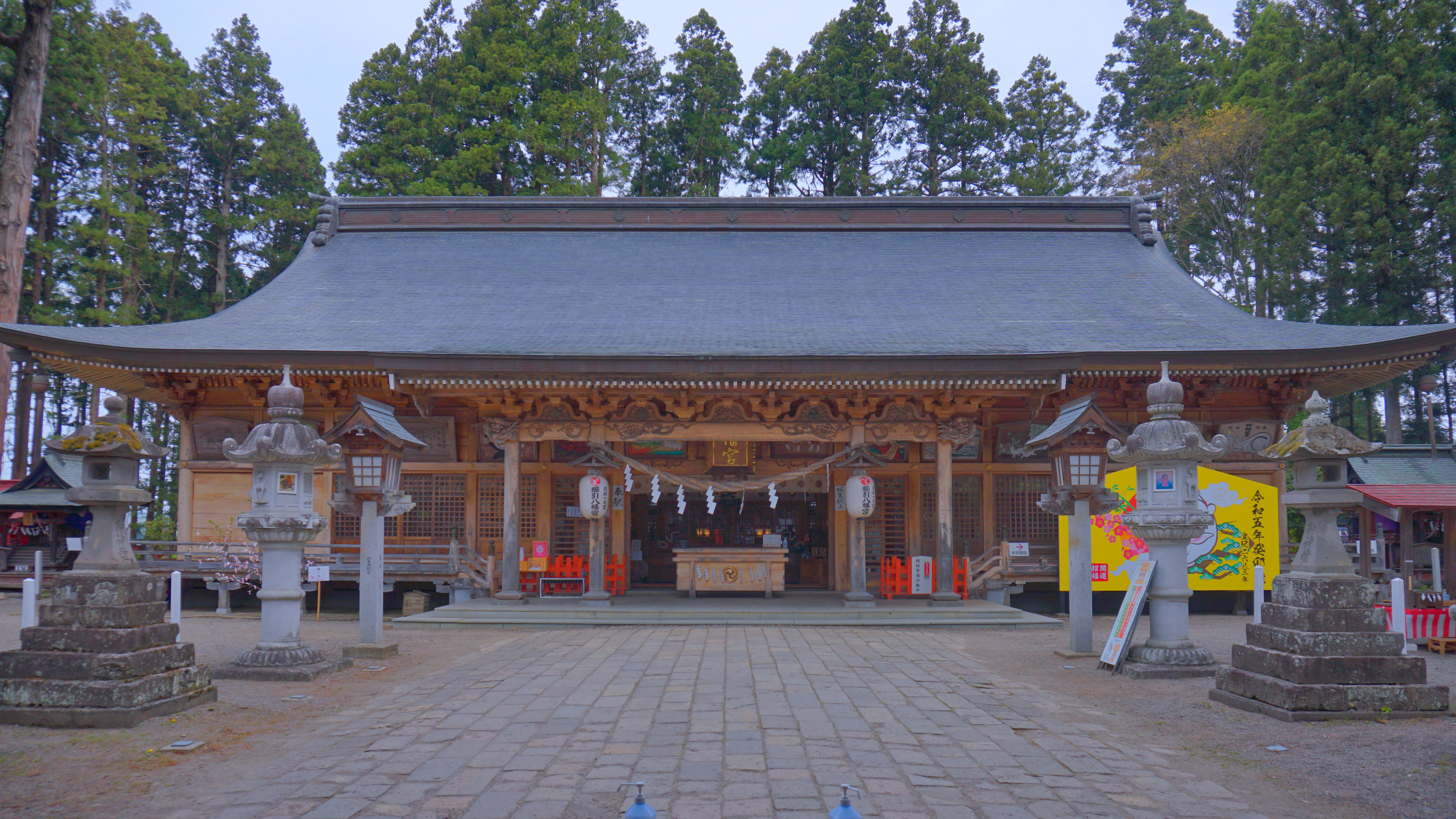

Religion
- Affiliation: Shinto
- Deity: Hachiman
- Type: Former Gō-sha

Location
- Location: 〒039-1105 Aomori, Hachinohe, Yawata, Hachimancho−３
- Country: Japan
- Interactive map of Kushihiki Hachimangū

Architecture
- Style: 3-bay (4-column) Nagare-zukuri, copper-roofed
- Established: 1190~1199

Kushihiki Hachimangū (櫛引八幡宮, Kushihiki Hachimangū) is a Shinto shrine located in Hachinohe, Aomori Prefecture, Japan. It is a Hachiman shrine, dedicated to the kami Hachiman. It was established c. 1190-1199. Its main festivals are held annually on April 15 and August 15 according to the lunar calendar, and on May 14. In the former Modern system of ranked Shinto shrines, it was classified as a district shrine (郷社, gōsha).

== See also ==
- List of Shinto shrines in Japan
- Hachiman shrine
