= Tsunashiki Tenjin Shrine =

Shrine in Osaka, Japan

Tsunashiki Tenjinsha 綱敷天神社(つなしきてんじんしゃ)
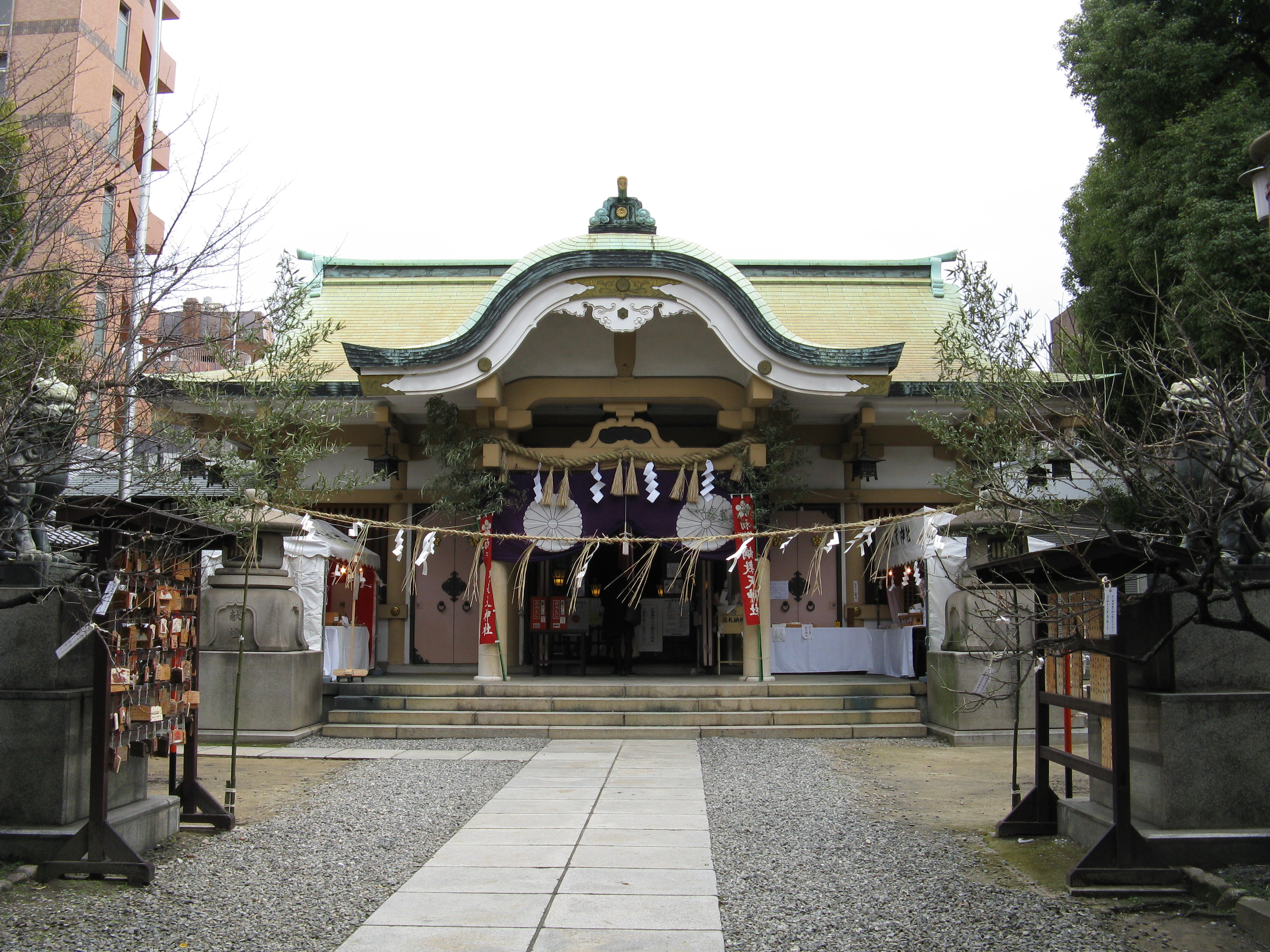
- Haiden of Tsunashiki Tenjinsha

- Location within Japan

Religion
- Affiliation: Shinto
- Deity: Emperor Saga; Sugawara no Michizane; Ukanomitama; Hakuryū; Sarutahiko Ōkami

Location
- Location: 9-11 Kamiyamacho, Kita Ward, Osaka, 530-0026, Japan
- Interactive map of Tsunashiki Tenjinsha 綱敷天神社(つなしきてんじんしゃ)
- Coordinates: 34°42′12.3546″N 135°30′18.4356″E

Architecture
- Established: 847 CE

Website
- tunashiki.sakura.ne.jp/tunashiki.html

Tsunashiki Tenjinsha (綱敷天神社, Tsunashiki Tenjinsha) is a Tenman-gū Shinto shrine located in Osaka, Osaka prefecture, Japan.

== Enshrined divinities (御祭神) ==
The enshrined divinities are:

- Emperor Saga (嵯峨天皇), 52nd emperor of Japan, worshipped as Kami-no-daijingū (神野太神宮)
- Sugawara no Michizane, scholar, poet and politician of the Heian Period, worshipped as Tenman-Tenjin (天満天神), Kami of academics, scholarship and learning
- Ukanomitama (宇迦之御魂大神) in the Ha Shrine undershrine, Kami of food and agriculture, often identified with Inari (稲荷神)
- Hakuryū (Dragon King) (白龍大神) in the Hakuryū Shrine undershrine, god of dragons and white snakes, and guardian god of houses, shrines and land.
- Sarutahiko Ōkami (猿田彦大神) in the Hakyrū Shrine undershrine, Kami of Misogi, strength and guidance.

== Branch Shrines (末社) ==
=== Inside of shrine perimeter ===
- Kitano Inari Shrine (喜多埜稲荷神社)
- Hakuyrū Shrine (白龍社)

=== Outside of shrine perimeter ===
- Ha Shrine (歯神社)

== Gallery ==
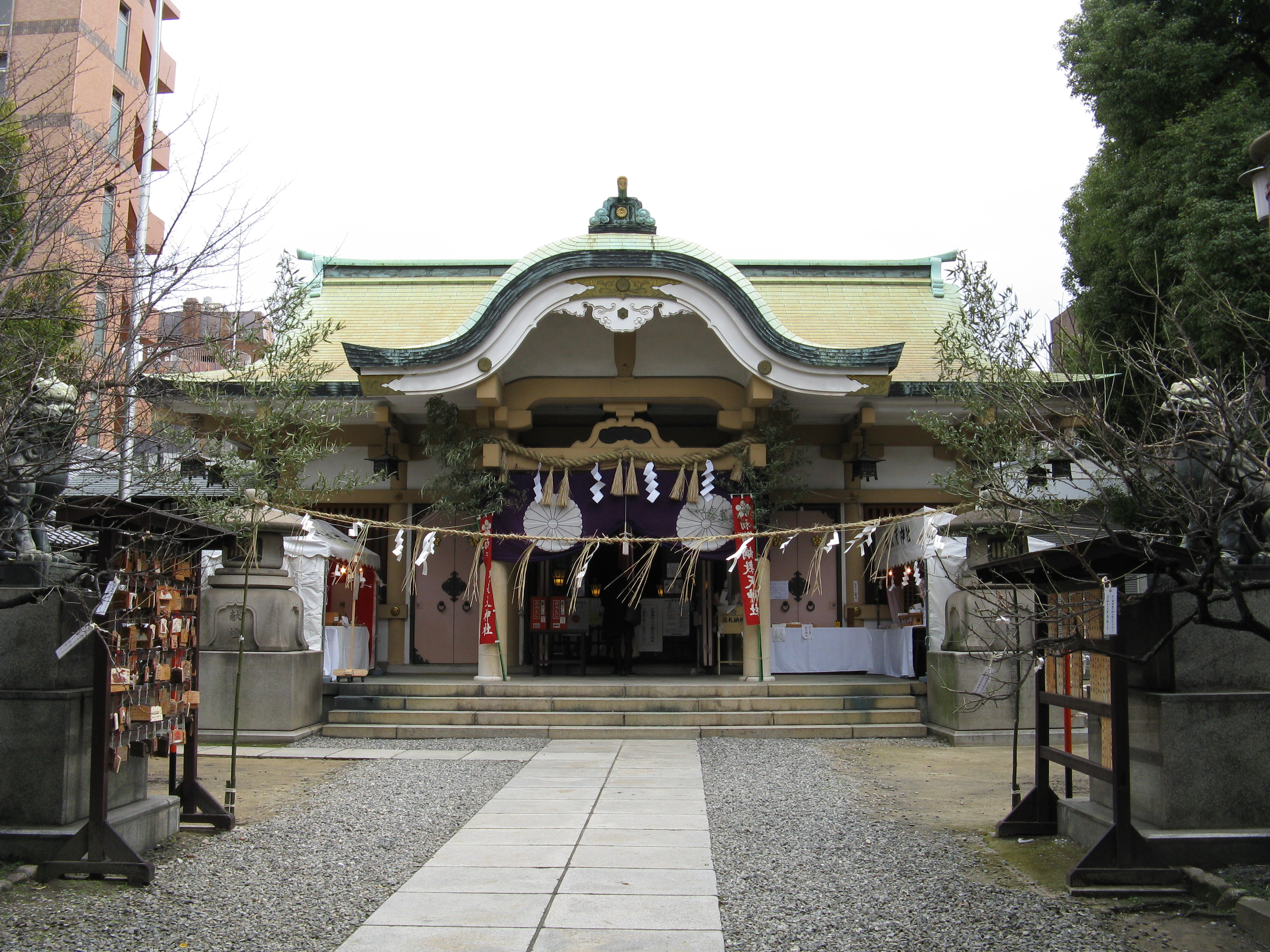
Tsunashiki-tenjinsha haiden

== See also ==
- List of Shinto shrines in Japan
