= Torigoe Hachiman Shrine =

Shrine in Shinjo, Yagamata Prefecture, Japan

Torigoe Hachiman Shrine (鳥越八幡神社, Torigoe Hachiman jinja, also called 鳥越八幡宮, Torigoe Hachimangū) is a Shinto shrine located in Shinjō, Yamagata Prefecture, Japan. It is a Hachiman shrine, dedicated to the kami Hachiman. The shrine was founded in 1229, and its annual festival is on August 15.

== See also ==
- List of Shinto shrines in Japan
- Hachiman shrine
