= Ubagami Daijingū =

Shinto shrine

Ubagami Daijingū (姥神大神宮)
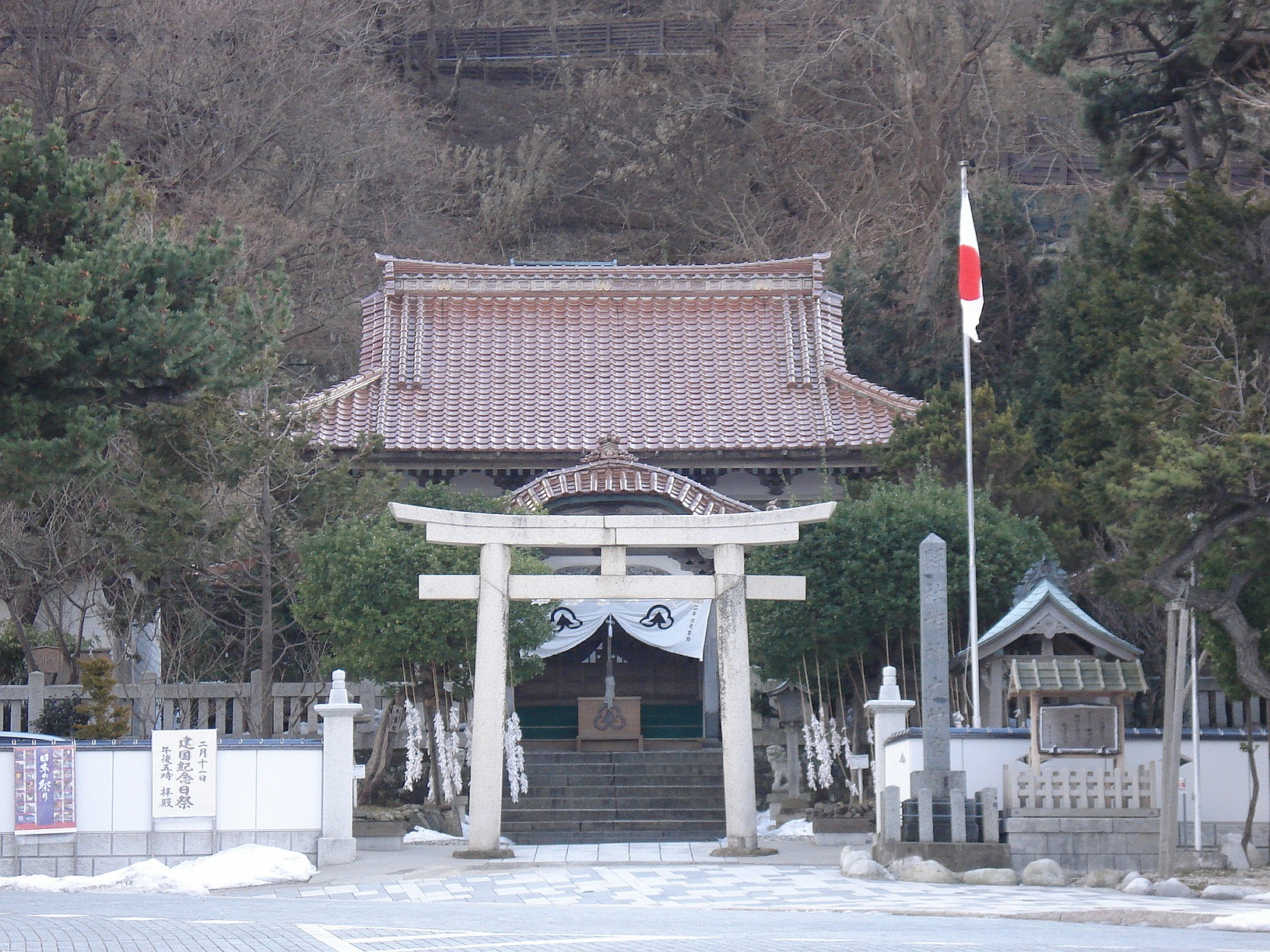
- Ubagami Daijingū

- Location within Japan

Religion
- Affiliation: Shinto

Location
- Location: Esashi, Hokkaidō, Japan.
- Interactive map of Ubagami Daijingū (姥神大神宮)
- Coordinates: 41°51′59.2″N 140°7′30.1″E

Ubagami Daijingū (姥神大神宮) is a Shinto shrine in Esashi, Hokkaidō, Japan. Its foundation date is uncertain but its existence is documented from the Edo period. It is considered the oldest Shinto Shrine in Hokkaido. The Ubagami Daijingū Togyosai, when floats decked out with lanterns are paraded through the town, is celebrated in August.

== See also ==
- Matsuri
- List of Shinto shrines in Hokkaidō
