= Futahashira Shrine =

Shinto shrine in Sendai, Miyagi, Japan

Coordinates: 38°19′08″N 140°53′09″E

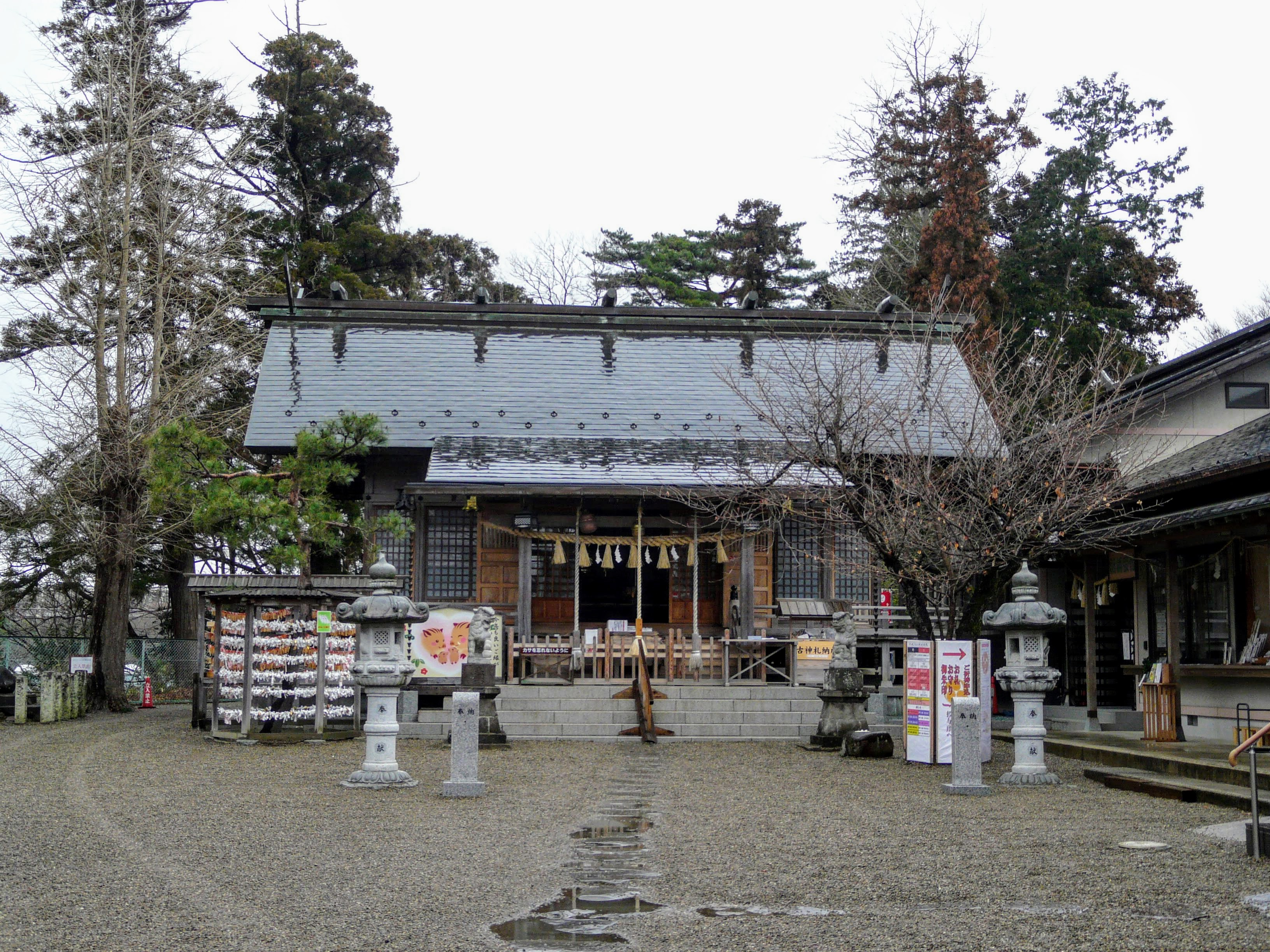

Religion
- Affiliation: Shintoism
- Year consecrated: 1026
- Interactive map of Futahashira Shrine

Futahashira Shrine (二柱神社, Futahashira jinja) is a Shinto shrine located in Sendai, Miyagi Prefecture, Japan. The main kami enshrined here are Izanagi and Izanami.

== See also ==
- List of Shinto shrines in Japan
