= Sumiyoshi Shrine (Hokkaidō) =

Shrine in Hokkaido, Japan

Coordinates: 43°10′58.6″N 141°0′11.6″E

Sumiyoshi Shrine (住吉神社, Sumiyoshi Jinja) is a Shinto shrine located in Otaru, Hokkaido. Its annual festival is on July 15. The kami Kamitsusu no O no Ōkami (上筒之男大神), Nakatsutsu no O no Ōkami (中筒之男大神), Sokotsutsu no O no Ōkami (底筒之男大神), Okinagaranushihime no Ōkami (息長足姫大神), Onamochi no Ōkami (大名持大神), Sukunabikona no Ōkami (少彦名大神) and others are enshrined here.

== See also ==
- List of Shinto shrines in Hokkaidō
