= Ebetsu Shrine =

Shinto shrine in Hokkaido, Japan

Ebetsu Shrine (江別神社)
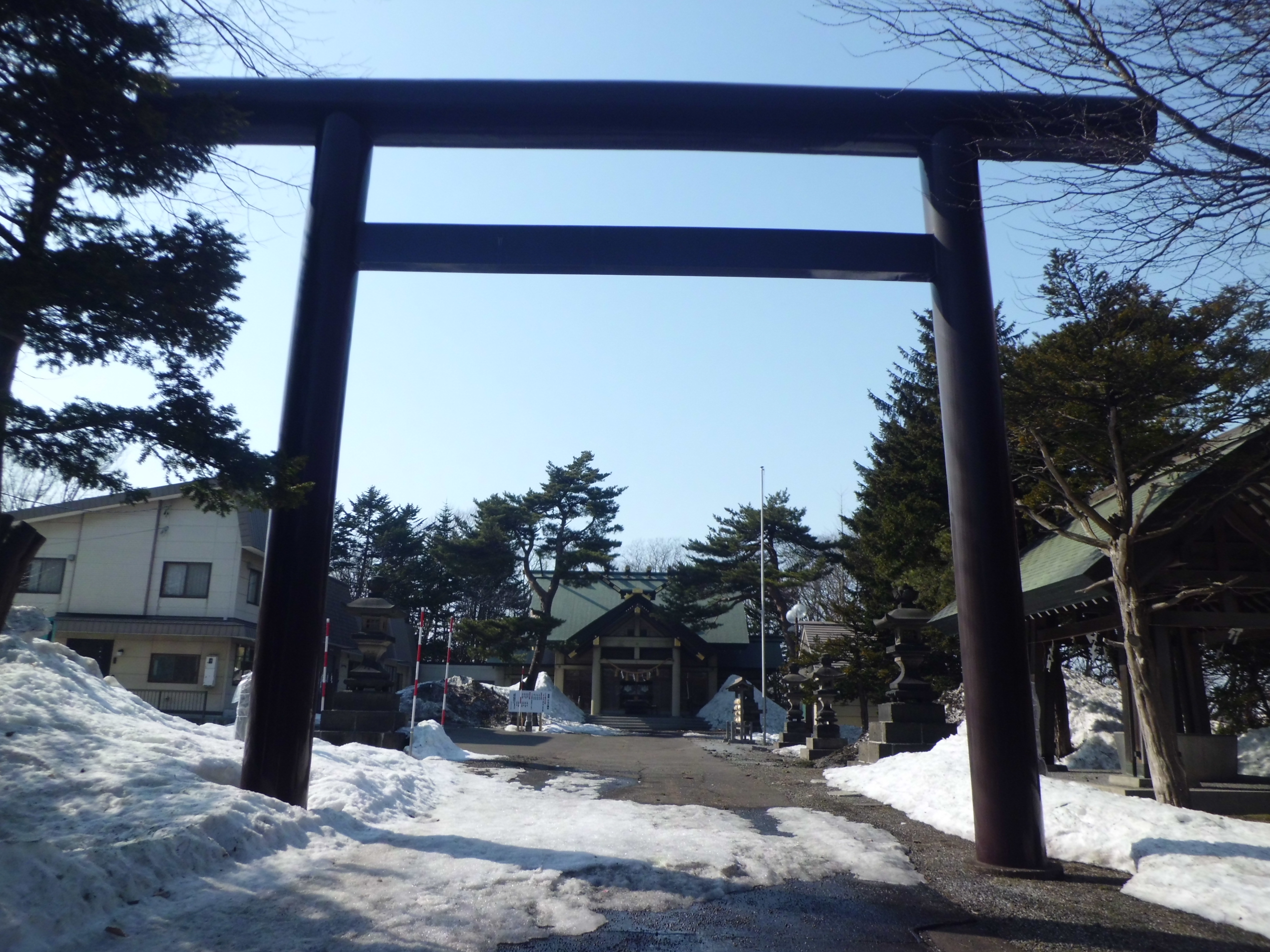

- Location within Japan

Religion
- Affiliation: Shinto
- Deity: Amaterasu, Taishō Emperor

Location
- Location: Ebetsu, Hokkaidō, Japan
- Coordinates: 43°06′38″N 141°33′15″E

Architecture
- Established: 1915

Ebetsu Shrine (江別神社, Ebetsu Jinja) is a Shinto shrine in Ebetsu, Hokkaidō, Japan. It was built in honour of the Taishō Emperor in 1915 and is modelled on the shinmei-zukuri style. Within the shrine is enshrined Amaterasu.

== See also ==
- State Shinto
- List of Shinto shrines in Hokkaidō
