= Kamikawa Shrine =

Shinto shrine in Asahikawa, Hokkaido, Japan

Coordinates: 43°45′08″N 142°21′53″E

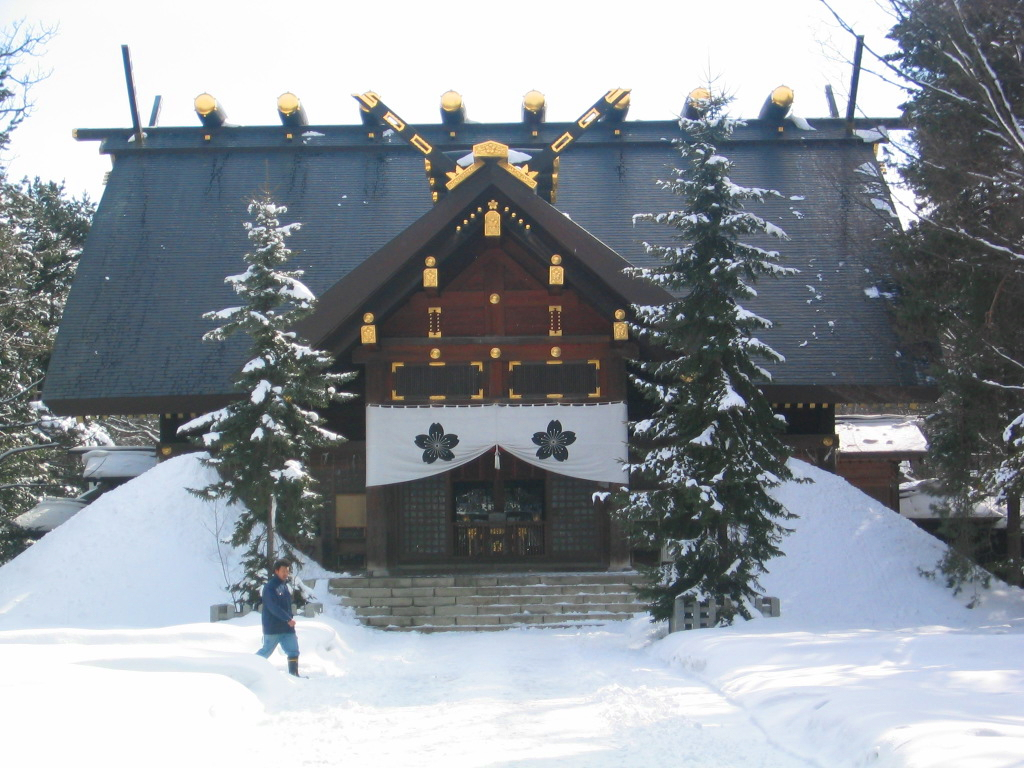

Religion
- Deity: Amaterasu; Ōkuninushi; Sukunabikona; Iwamura Michitoshi
- Interactive map of Kamikawa Shrine

Kamikawa Shrine (上川神社, Kamikawa jinja) is a Shinto shrine located in Asahikawa, Hokkaido. Established in 1883, it is dedicated to the kami Amaterasu (天照皇大御神), Ōkuninushi (大己貴大神), Sukunabikona no Ōkami (少彦名大神), Toyoukebime (豊受姫神), Ōmononushi (大物主神), Ame-no-Kaguyama-no-Mikoto (天乃香久山神), Takeminakata (建御名方神), Emperor Ōjin as Hondawake no Mikoto (譽田分命), and others. Its annual festival is on July 21.

== See also ==
- List of Shinto shrines in Hokkaidō
