= Naitō Memorial Museum =

- 内藤記念館
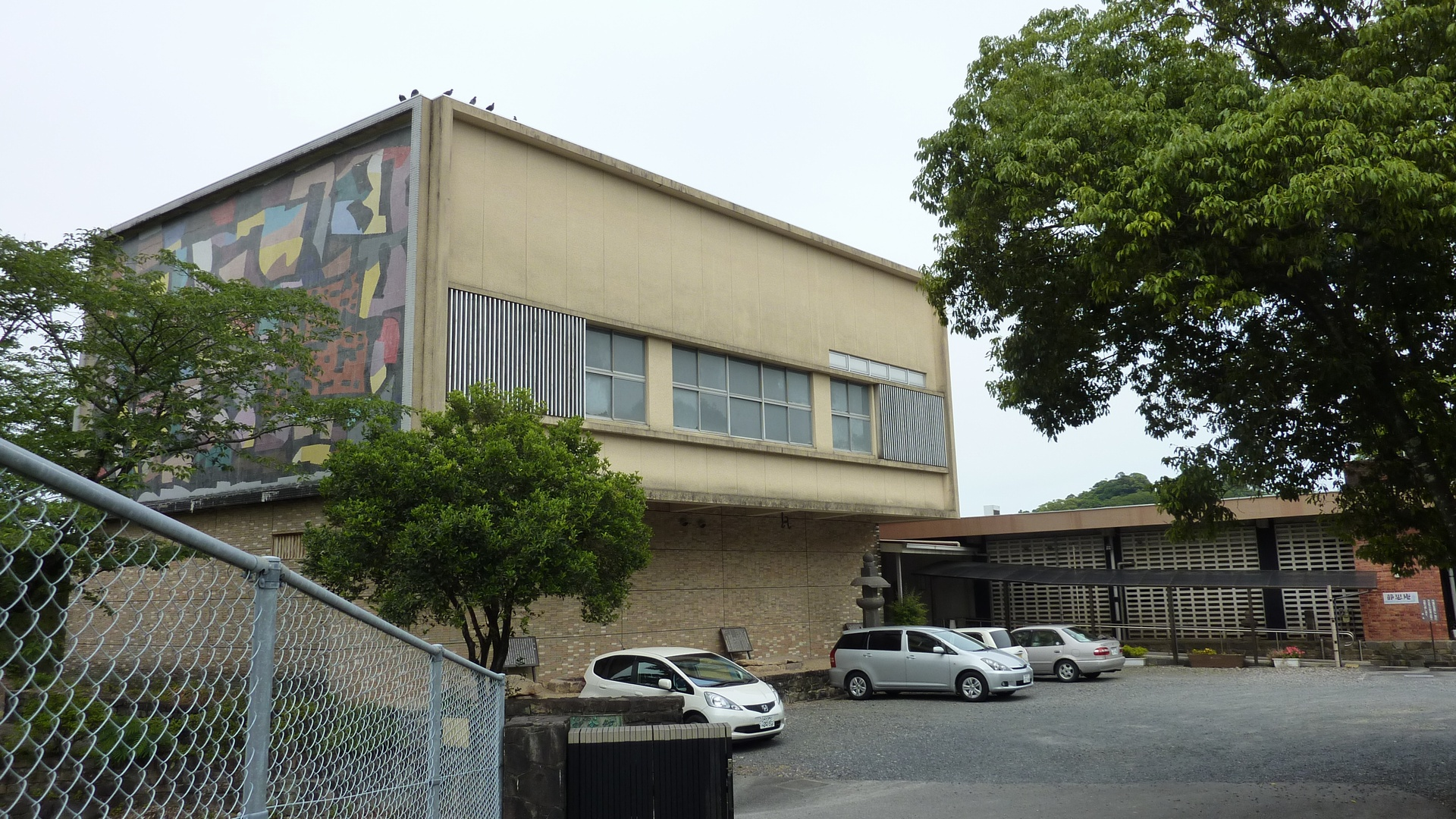

General information
- Location: 255-1 Tenjin koji, Nobeoka, Miyazaki Prefecture, Japan
- Coordinates: 32°34′54″N 131°39′31″E
- Opened: 1963
- Renovated: 1990–1992

Naitō Memorial Museum (内藤記念館, Naitō Kikenkan) opened in Nobeoka, Miyazaki Prefecture, Japan, in 1963. The collection relates to the history, culture, and folklore of Nobeoka with a particular emphasis on the Naitō clan; as of March 2015, it comprised some 53,000 archaeological materials, 11,780 historical materials, 3,200 folk materials, and 760 artworks (primarily prints and yōga). Currently being redeveloped at a projected cost of ¥2.8 bn, the museum is scheduled to reopen in 2022.

== See also ==
- History of Miyazaki Prefecture
- List of Historic Sites of Japan (Miyazaki)
- List of Cultural Properties of Japan - paintings (Miyazaki)
