= Nishino Shrine =

Shrine in Sapporo, Hokkaido, Japan

Coordinates: 43.0597°N 141.2605°E

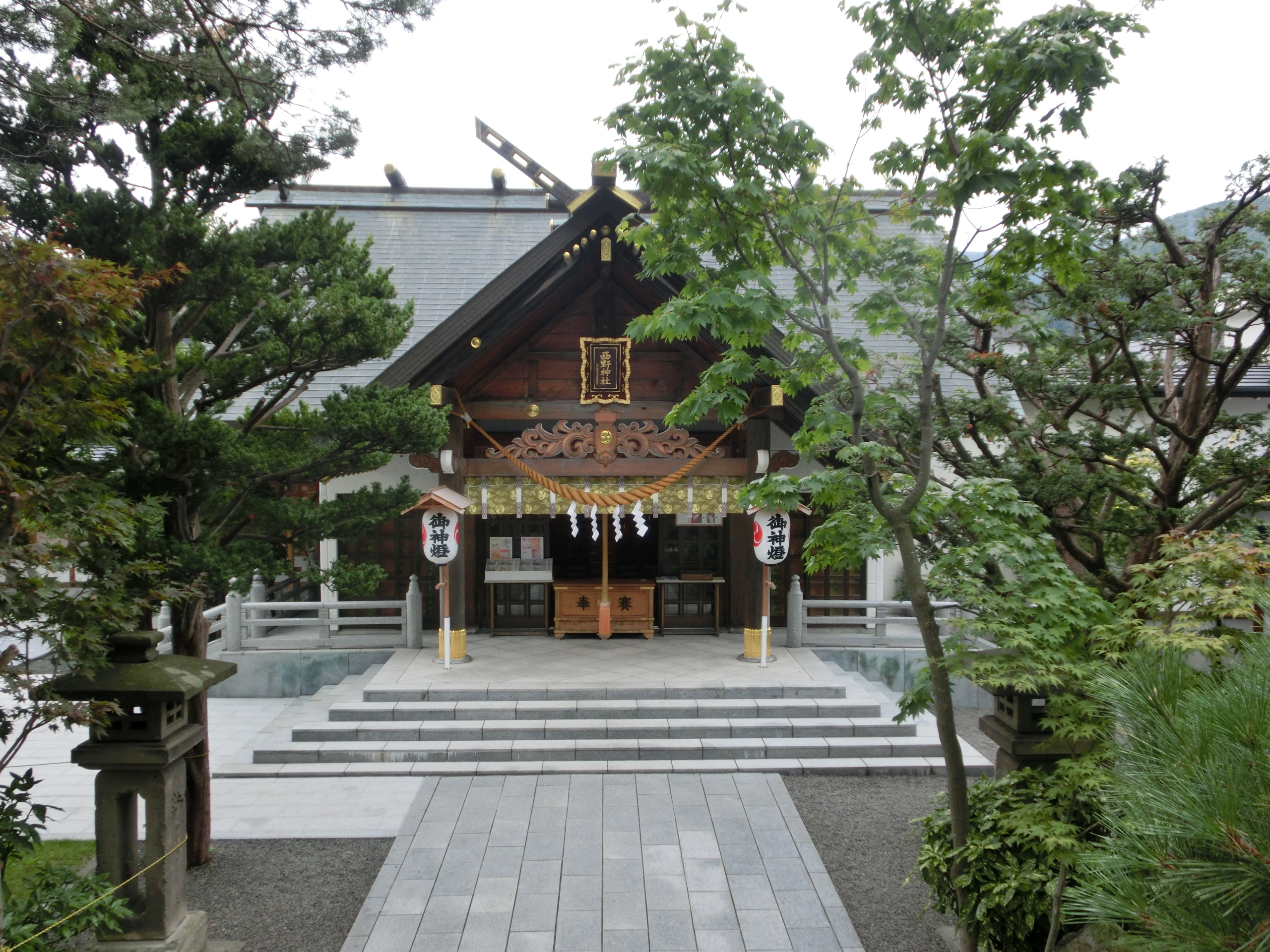

Nishino Shrine (西野神社, Nishino jinja) is a Shinto shrine located in Sapporo, Hokkaido. It was established in 1885, and enshrines the kami Toyotama-hime (豊玉姫命), Ugayafukiaezu no mikoto (鵜草葺不合命), and Emperor Ōjin as Hondawake no mikoto (譽田別命). The shrine is constructed in the Shinmei-zukuri architectural style.

== See also ==
- List of Shinto shrines in Hokkaidō
