= Obihiro Shrine =

Shrine in Obihiro, Hokkaido, Japan

Coordinates: 42°55′56″N 143°12′32″E

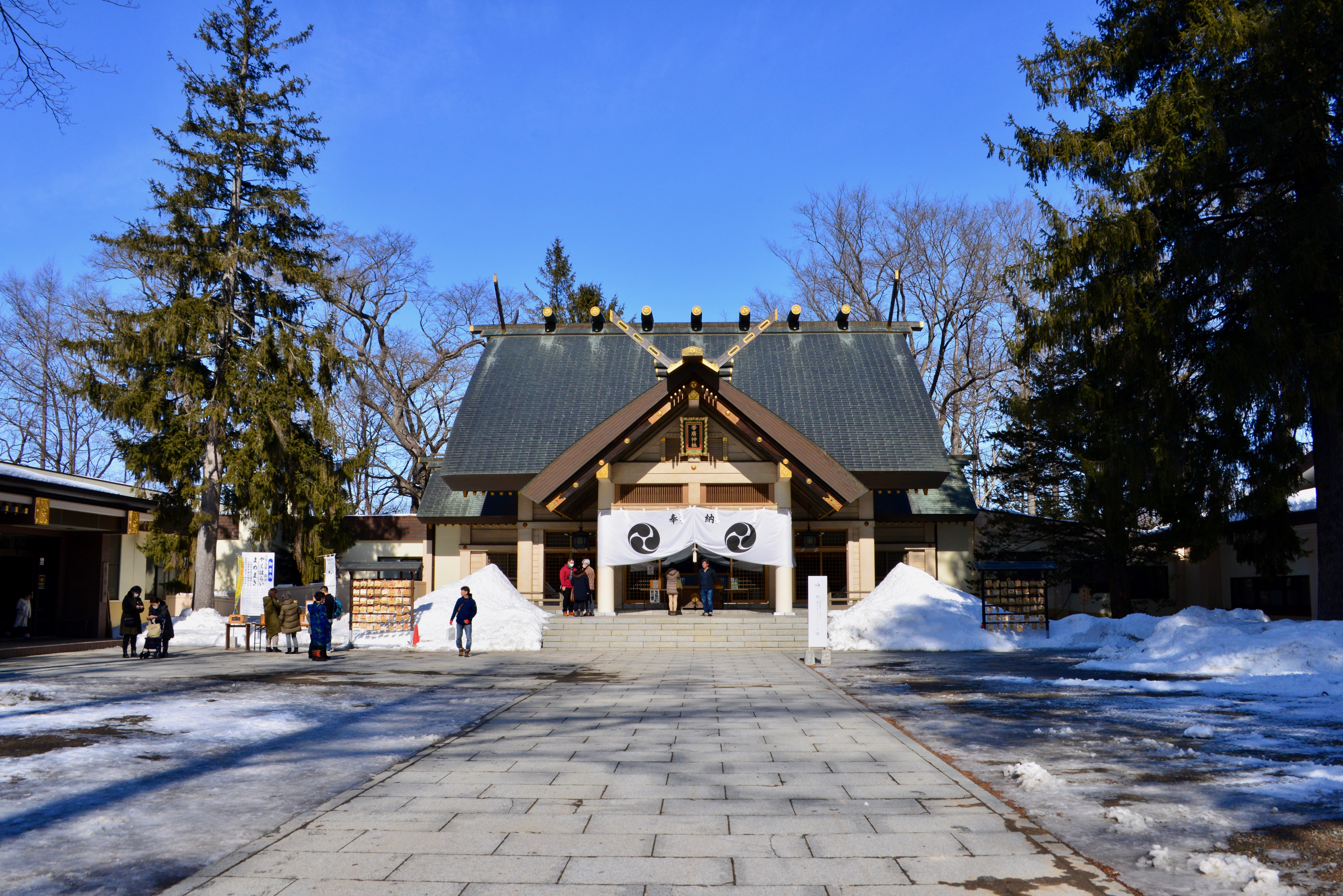

Obihiro Shrine (帯廣神社, Obihiro jinja) is a Shinto shrine located in Obihiro, Hokkaido. Erected in 1910, it is dedicated to the kami Ōkuni-mitama no mikoto (大國魂神), Ōkuninushi no mikoto (大那牟遲神), and Sukunabikona no mikoto (少彦名神). Its annual festival is on September 24. Obihiro Shrine was formerly ranked as a prefectural shrine.

== See also ==
- List of Shinto shrines in Hokkaidō
