= Itsukushima Shrine (Kushiro) =

Shinto shrine in Japan

Coordinates: 42°58′19″N 144°22′19″E

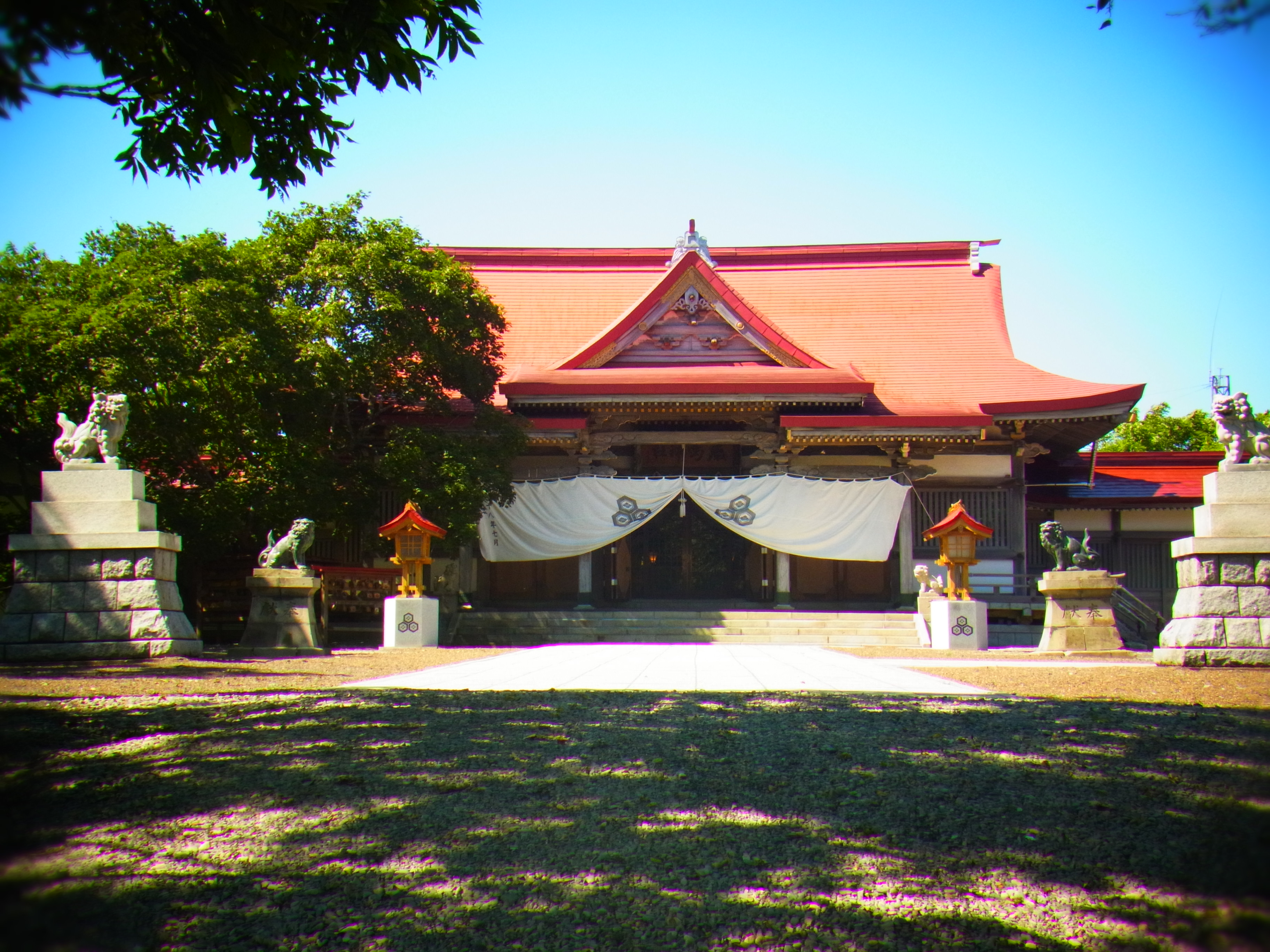

Itsukushima Shrine (厳島神社, Itsukushima Jinja) is a Shinto shrine in Kushiro, Hokkaidō, Japan. It was founded at the beginning of the nineteenth century. A statue of Yakushi or Kannon by Enkū has been designated a Prefectural Cultural Property.

== See also ==
- Itsukushima Jinja
- Enkū
- List of Shinto shrines in Hokkaidō
