= Tarumaezan Shrine =

Shrine in Tomakomai, Hokkaido, Japan

Coordinates: 42°39′40″N 141°36′16″E

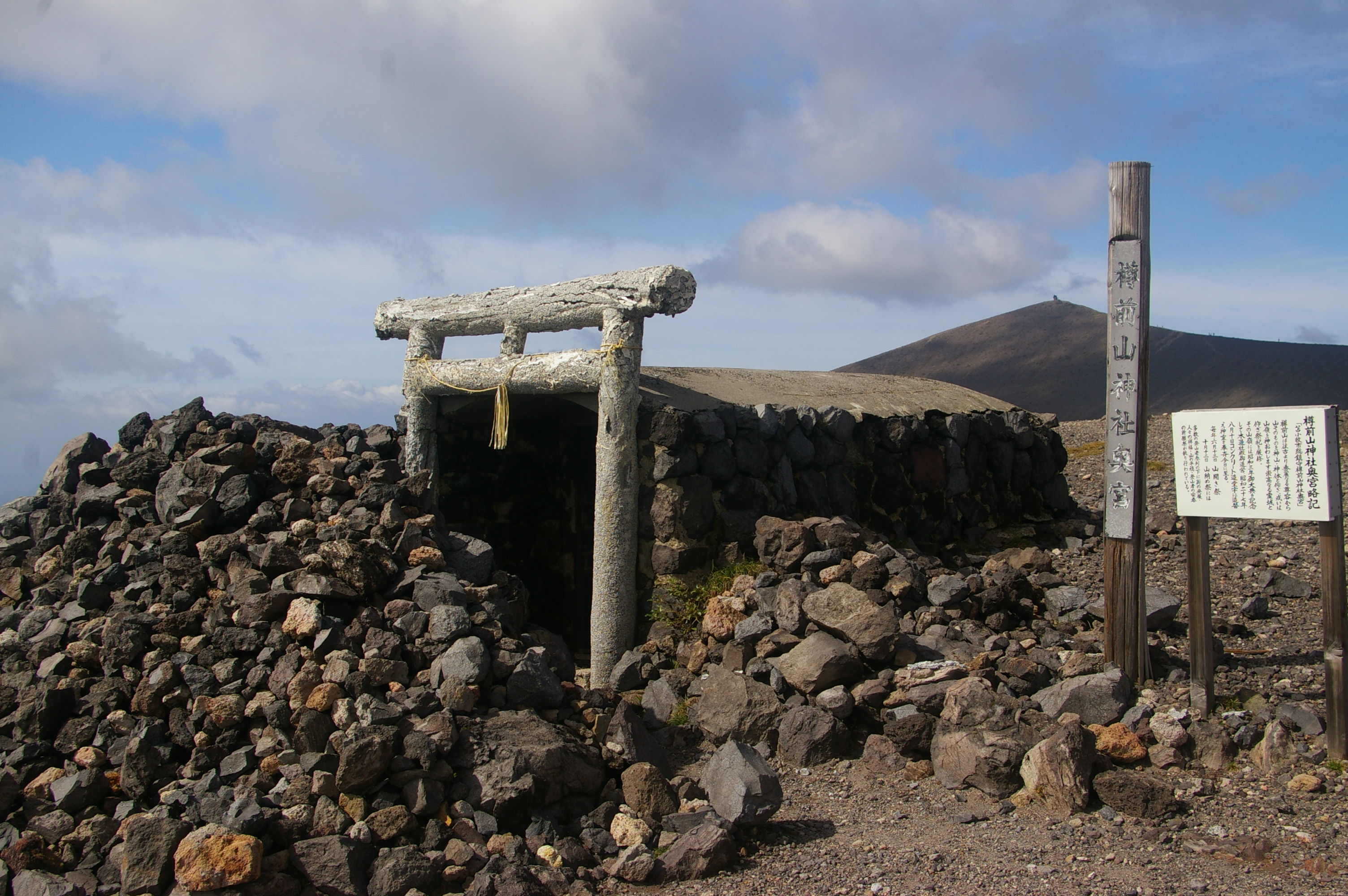

Tarumaezan Shrine (樽前山神社, Tarumaezan Jinja) is a Shinto shrine in Tomakomai, Iburi Subprefecture, Hokkaidō, Japan. It is located on Mount Tarumae, and it was promoted to a prefectural shrine in 1936. It enshrines the Shinto kami Kukunochi (久久能智神), Kaya no hime (鹿屋野比賣神), and Oyamatsumi (大山津見神).

== See also ==
- List of Shinto shrines in Hokkaidō
