= Ikushina Shrine =

Shinto shrine in Gunma Prefecture, Japan

Ikushina Jinja 生品神社
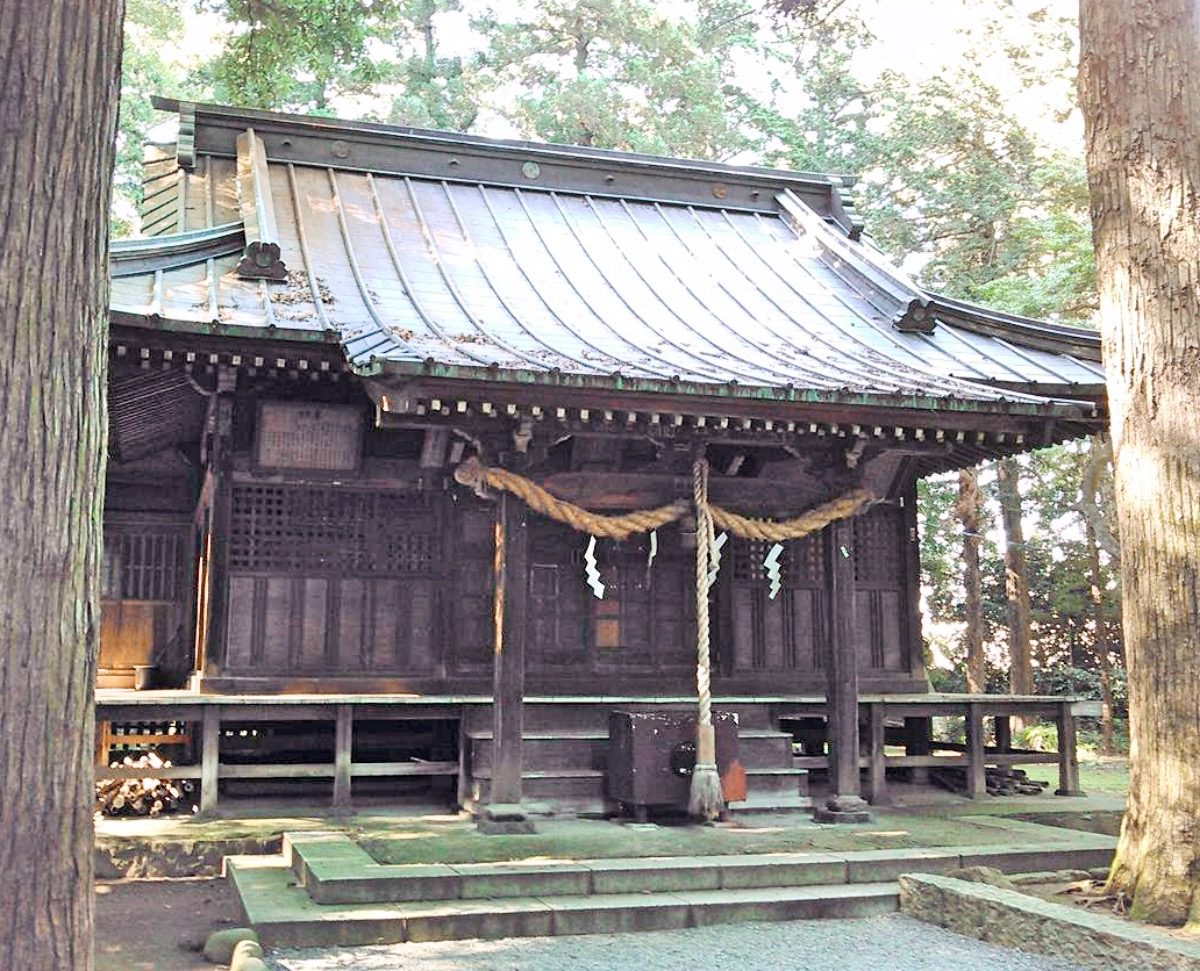
- Ikushina Jinja honden

- Location within Gunma Prefecture Location within Japan

Religion
- Affiliation: Shinto
- Deity: Ōkuninushi
- Festival: May 8

Location
- Location: 1923 Nitta-inchinoimachi, Ota-shi, Gunma-ken
- Coordinates: 36°19′2.9″N 139°18′26.8″E

Architecture
- Established: c. Heian period

Ikushina Jinja (生品神社) is a Shinto shrine located in the city of Ōta, Gunma, Japan, dedicated to the kami Ōkuninushi. The precincts of this shrine was designated a National Historic Site of Japan in 1934.

== History ==
The foundation of the Ikushina Jinja is unknown, but it is located on a portion of a great landed estate (shōen) controlled by the Nitta clan since the end of the Heian period, and may have originally been constructed to placate the spirit of Taira no Masakado. The shrine only gained prominence with the establishment of State Shintoism following the Meiji restoration as the new Meiji government chose to glorify the late Kamakura period imperial loyalist Nitta Yoshisada and the events of the Kemmu restoration. Per the medieval chronicle Taiheiki, this shrine is said to have been the location where Nitta Yoshisada first raised his banner to rally his clansmen in revolt against the Kamakura shogunate in 1333. It was made a prefectural shrine under the Modern system of ranked Shinto shrines.

In 1934 the precincts were made a National Historic Site to commemorate the 600th anniversary of the Kenmu restoration. A bronze statue of Nitta Yoshisada was erected in 1983. In the year 2000, the shrine was included as one of the eleven sites covered in the expanded National Historic Site designation of the Nitta shōen ruins. The shrine is located a 15-minute bus ride from Ōta Station on the Tobu Isesaki Line.

== See also ==
- List of Shinto shrines
- List of Historic Sites of Japan (Gunma)
