= Moto-Sumiyoshi Shrine =

Shrine

Moto-Sumiyoshi Shrine (本住吉神社, Motosumiyoshi Jinja)
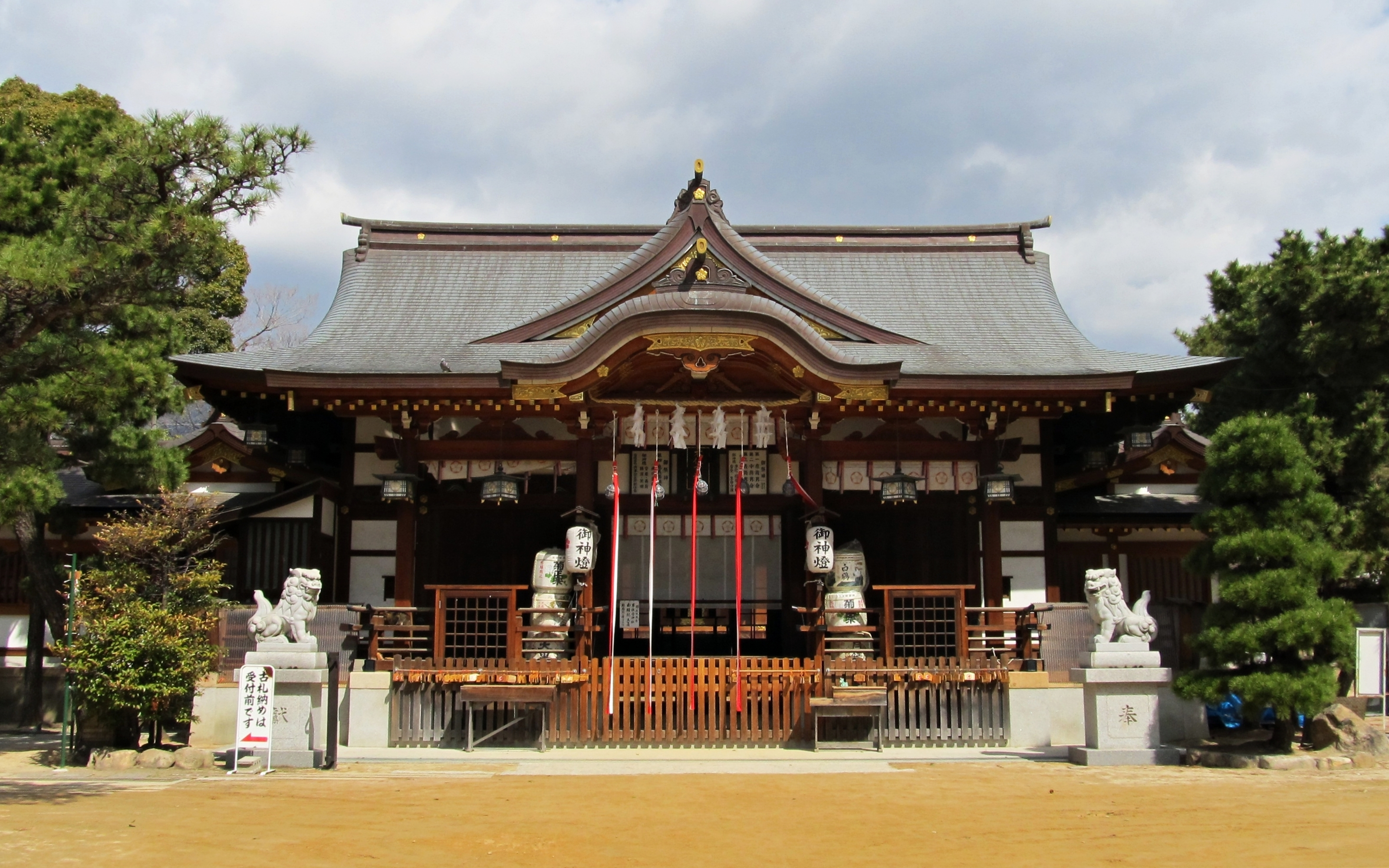

- Location within Japan

Religion
- Affiliation: Shinto
- Deity: Sokotsutsu-no-O-no-Mikoto; Nakatsutsu-no-O-no-Mikoto; Uwatsutsu-no-O-no-Mikoto; Empress Jingū; Amenokoyane-no-Mikoto; Ōyamatsumi-no-Mikoto

Location
- Interactive map of Moto-Sumiyoshi Shrine (本住吉神社, Motosumiyoshi Jinja)
- Coordinates: 34.7187453°N 135.260127°E

Moto-Sumiyoshi Shrine (本住吉神社, Motosumiyoshi Jinja) is a Japanese Shinto shrine in Higashinada ward, Kobe. It is one of the biggest shrines in western Kobe. It is next to Sumiyoshi Station. The shrine has existed since the 13th century.

== Festivals ==
The Higashinada Danjiri festival is held in the shrine area each May. Thirty-two Danjiri festival carts depart through the shrine’s gate and are paraded through the streets surrounding the shrine to pray for protection from disease and disasters.

== Controversy ==
It is insisted by the Shrine in its "Chronicle of Moto-Sumiyoshi Shrine" (2000), based on Kojiki-den written by Motoori Norinaga, that the head of Sumiyoshi Shrine originally moved from this Shrine to Sumiyoshi Taisha because Moto-Sumiyoshi Shrine has "Moto-" which means "the Head".

== Access ==
The shrine is 1 minute walk from JR Sumiyoshi station, and 10 minutes walk from the Hanshin Electric Railway Sumiyoshi station.
