= Atago Shrine (Sendai) =

Shinto shrine in Miyagi Prefecture, Japan

Coordinates: 38.24583°N 140.87561°E

- 愛宕神社
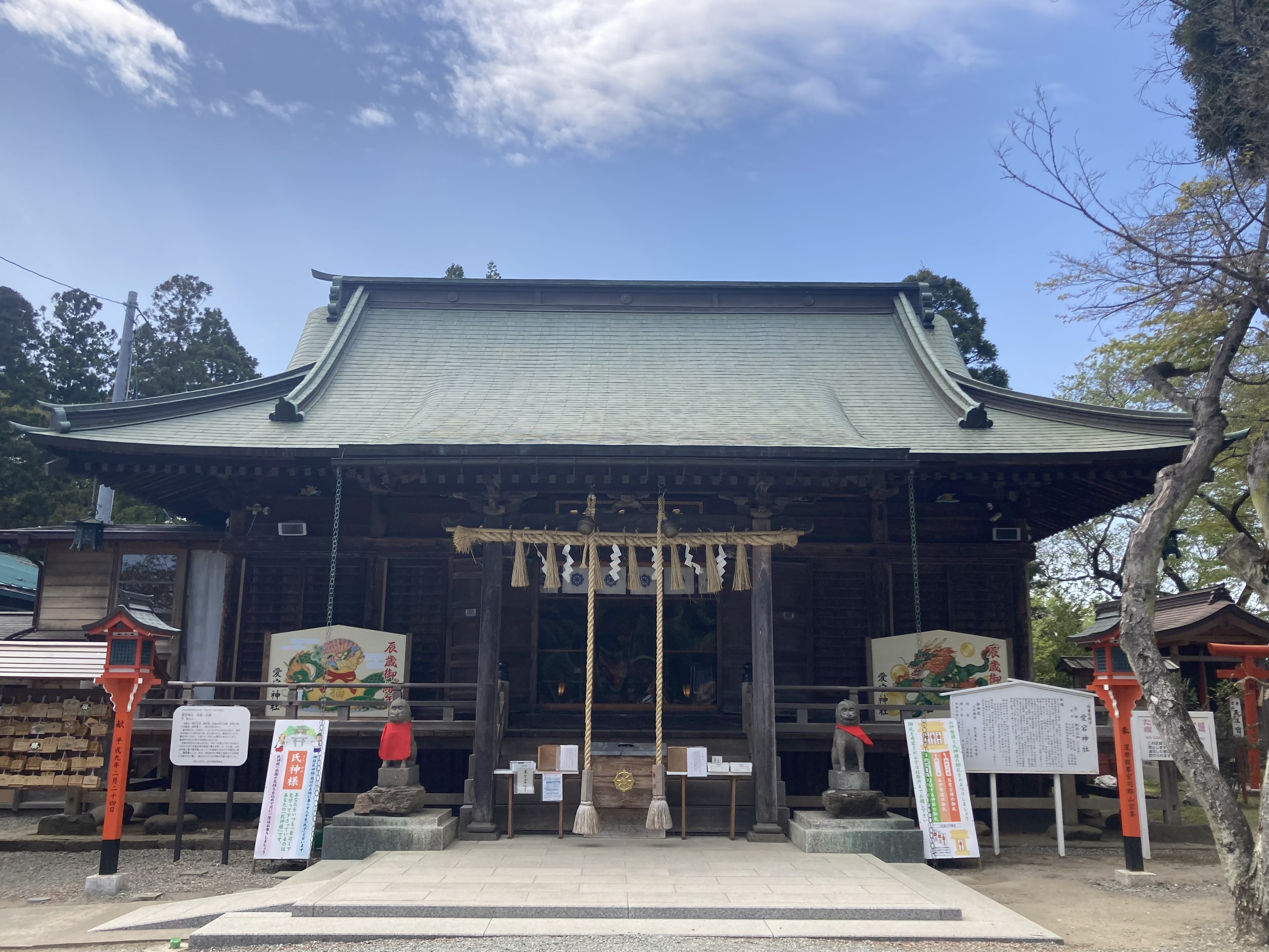
- Atago Shrine, ca. April 2024

Religion
- Affiliation: Shinto
- Deity: Kagu-tsuchi
- Festival: July 24

Location
- Location: 4 Chome-17-1 Mukaiyama, Taihaku-ku Ward, Sendai, Miyagi Prefecture, Japan
- Interactive map of Atago Shrine

Architecture
- Style: Nagare-zukuri
- Established: 1650

Atago Shrine (愛宕神社, Atago jinja) is a Shinto shrine located in Sendai, Miyagi Prefecture, Japan. It enshrines the kami Kagu-tsuchi (軻遇土神), and its annual festival takes place on July 24.

It was sunk by a torpedo attack from the American submarine "Dartar" on October 23, 1944. Japanese Cruiser Atago in Memorial.

== See also ==
- List of Shinto shrines in Japan
