= Rokusho Shrine, Okazaki =

Shinto shrine in Aichi Prefecture, Japan

Rokusho Shrine 六所神社
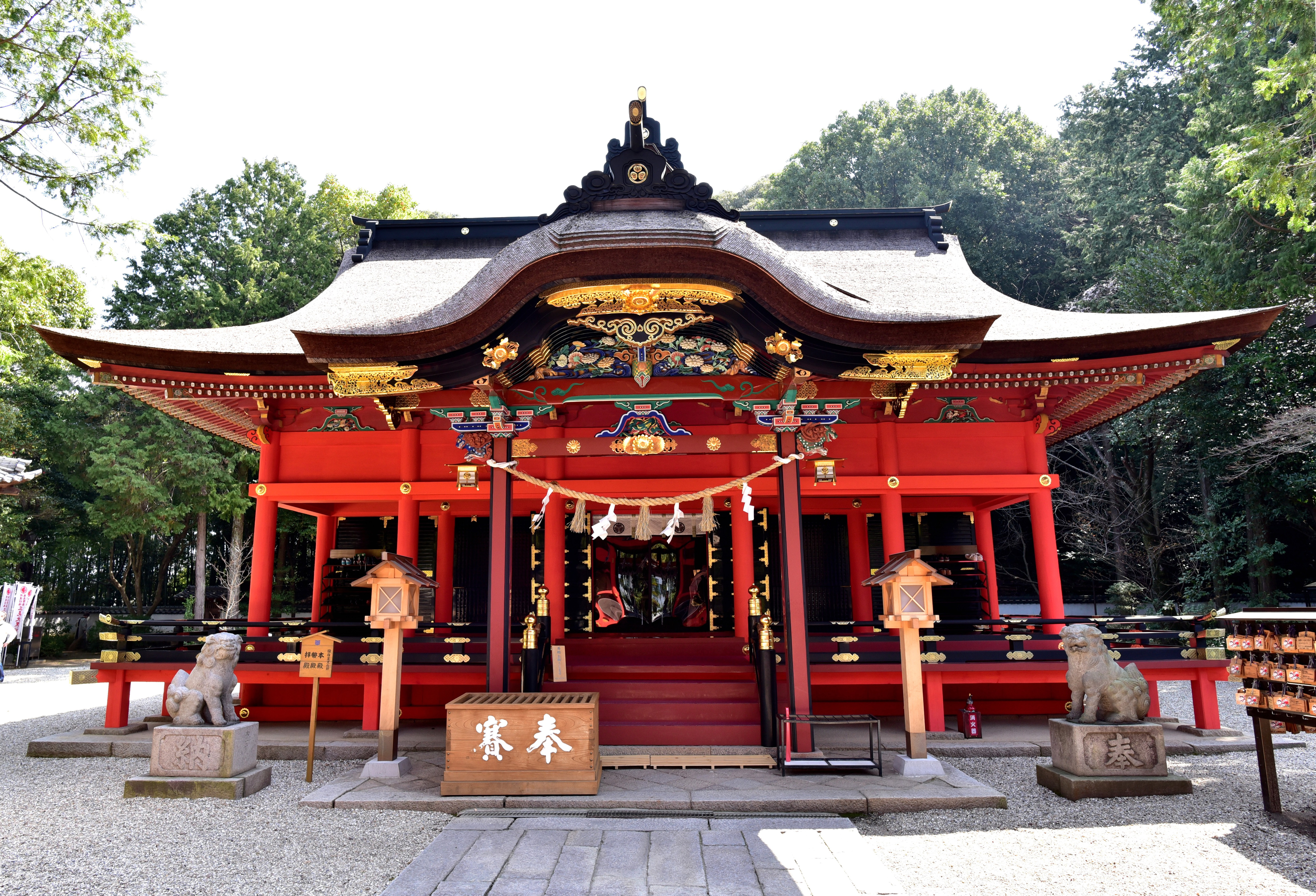

- Location within Japan

Religion
- Affiliation: Shinto
- Deity: Sarutahiko; Shiotsuchi no oji Kotokatsu Kunikatsu Nagisa

Location
- Location: 44, Aza-Mimitori, Myodaiji-cho; Okazaki, Aichi 444-0864
- Interactive map of Rokusho Shrine 六所神社
- Coordinates: 34°56′57.95″N 137°10′6.39″E

Architecture
- Founder: Tokugawa Ieyasu
- Established: 1602

Rokusho Shrine (六所神社, Rokusho-jinja) is a Shinto shrine located in the city of Okazaki, Aichi Prefecture in Japan.

== History ==
The shrine was founded by Tokugawa Ieyasu in 1602 when the honden was constructed. The kami (deities) from Rokusho Shrine in Matsudaira county (present-day Toyota), in which the Matsudaira clan (ancestors of the Tokugawa clan) originated, were transferred to the new shrine.

Rōmon, the shrine's gate

The buildings were renovated on the orders of Ieyasu's grandson, the 3rd shōgun Tokugawa Iemitsu, during his visit to Okazaki on the way to Kyoto. The rōmon, a Gongen style gate, was commissioned by Iemitsu's son and successor, Tokugawa Ietsuna.

Because of its connection with the Tokugawa family, Rokusho Shrine received a large degree of protection during the shogunate's reign. Up until the Meiji Restoration, only daimyō with 50,000 or more koku of rice were allowed to climb the stone steps leading to the rōmon and ultimately the shrine.

== Important Cultural Properties ==
The honden, haiden, heiden (votive offerings hall), rōmon and shingusho (offering preparation hall) are all protected as Important Cultural Properties.

== Theme ==
Today the shrine enjoys a popularity with women praying for an easy childbirth.

== See also ==
- List of Shinto shrines
