= Mikado Shrine =

Shinto shrine in Misato, Japan

Mikado-jinja 神門神社
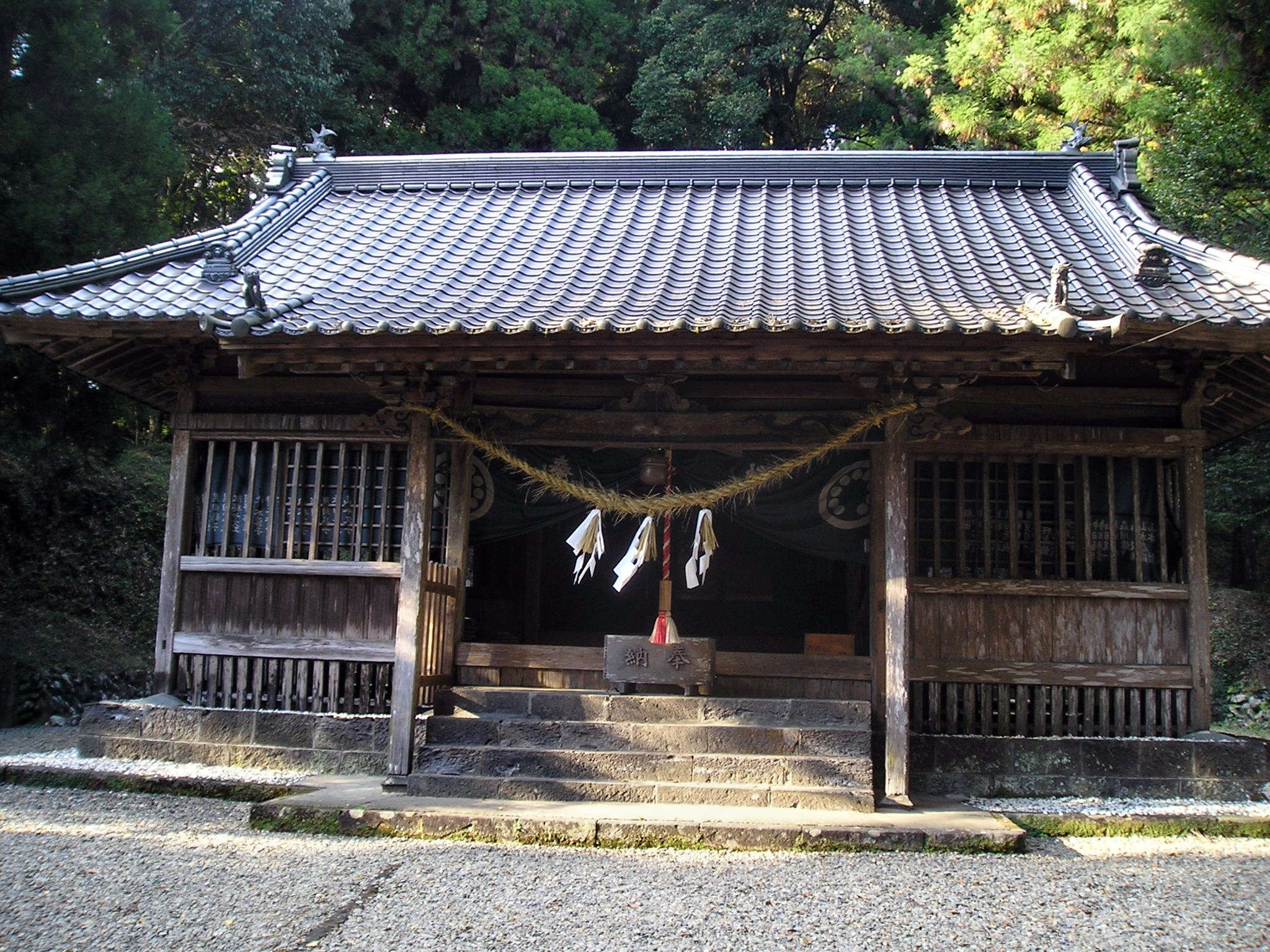
- The honden, or main shrine

- Location within Japan

Religion
- Affiliation: Shinto
- Deity: Ōhoyamatsumi

Location
- Location: 69-2, Nangō-ku Mikado, Misato; Higashiusuki District; Miyazaki 883-0306
- Coordinates: 32°23′10″N 131°19′51″E

Architecture
- Established: 718

Mikado-jinja (神門神社) is a Shinto shrine located in Misato, Miyazaki prefecture, Japan. It is dedicated to Ōhoyamatsumi and other kami.
