= Kume no Heinai-dō =

Shinto shrine in Tokyo, Japan

Kume no Heinai-dō (久米平内堂)
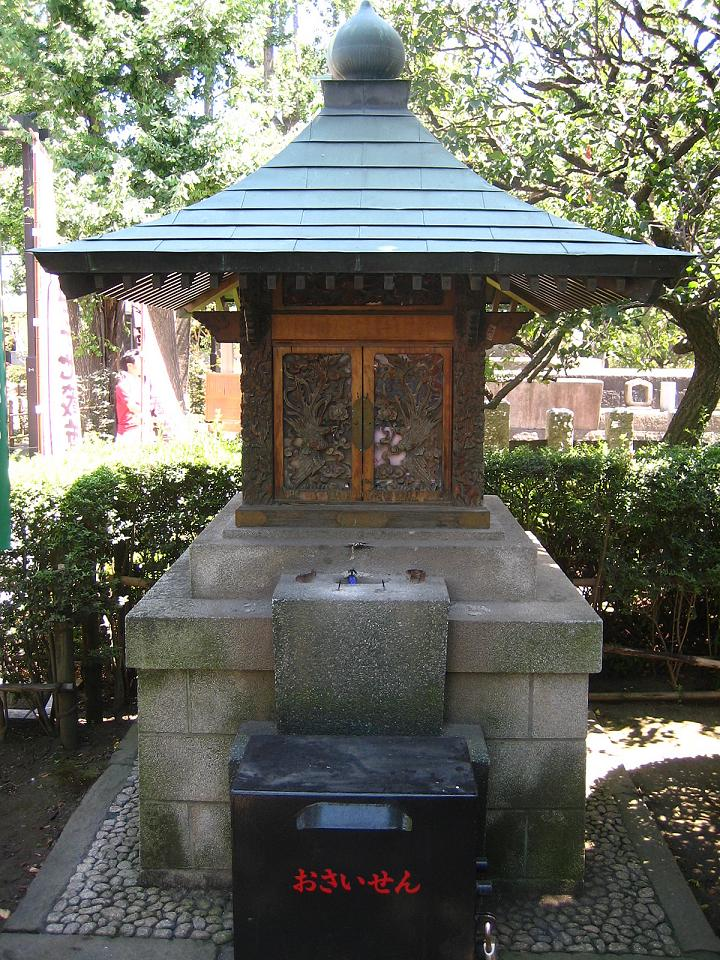
- The Kume no Heinai-do shrine

- Location within Japan

Religion
- Affiliation: Shinto

Location
- Coordinates: 35°42′49″N 139°47′49″E

Kume no Heinai-dō (久米平内堂) is a small folk shrine located in Asakusa in Taitō, Tokyo. The shrine houses a stone statue of Kume no Heinai, a samurai from the early Edo period (17th century). According to the Asakusa tourism bureau, there are few facts about the life of Kume no Heinai, but he is said to have died in 1683. Oral tradition holds that Heinai excelled in Kenjutsu, the martial art of swordsmanship, killing many people over the years. In the latter half of his life, he is said to have lived in the Sensō-ji temple in Asakusa where he devoted himself to Zen-Buddhism and held religious services in honor of the people he killed. Shortly before his death he ordered his followers to carve his likeness on a stone and bury it near the Niōmon – the entrance to the Buddhist temple and a busy district in the city. His wish was to have his statue be stepped on by as many people as possible in order to expiate the crimes he committed in life. The statue was eventually retrieved and is now stored inside the shrine itself. It is because of this that the shrine initially carried the name Fumitsuke (踏みつけ), which means "to tread on", but over time the meaning was lost and the shrine's name came to be spelled 文付け, which means "love letter". Both words are pronounced Fumitsuke and the shrine is now worshipped by the general public as a deity of marriage and match-making. Kume no Heinai-dō was destroyed in March 1945 during World War II. The current temple was rebuilt in October 1978.
