= Hokkaidō Gokoku Shrine =

Coordinates: 43°47′17″N 142°22′00″E

- Location within Japan

Religion
- Affiliation: Shinto
- Type: Gokoku shrine (Formerly Shokonsha)

Location
- Interactive map of Hokkaidō Gokoku Shrine

Hokkaidō Gokoku Shrine (北海道護国神社, Hokkaidō Gokoku jinja) is a Shinto shrine located in Asahikawa, Hokkaido at 1 Chome-2282-2 Hanasakicho, Asahikawa, Hokkaido 070-0901. It was established in 1902, and enshrines Raijin (雷電大神), Sarutahiko Ōkami (猿田彦大神), and other kami.

It is a Gokoku Shrine, or a shrine dedicated to war dead. Such shrines were made to serve to enshrine the war dead, and they were all considered "branches" of Yasukuni Shrine. They were renamed from Shokonsha in 1939. 63,141 people are enshrined there.

== See also ==
- List of Shinto shrines in Hokkaidō
- Controversies surrounding Yasukuni Shrine
- Hero shrine
- Martial temple and Wen Wu temple
- National Revolutionary Martyrs' Shrine
- Eternal Spring Shrine
- Chinese Cultural Renaissance
- Ancestral shrine
- Gallant Garden
- Gokoku Shrines
- Tomb of the Unknown Soldier
- Arlington National Cemetery
- Valhalla (home to the souls of fallen warriors in Scandinavian mythology)
- Walhalla Shrine (a hall of fame in Germany honoring "commendable and honorable Germans")
- Eternal Spring Shrine
- The common end of myriad good deeds
- Greek hero cult
