= Hamada Castle =

Castle ruins in Hamada, Japan

- 浜田城
- Hamada, Shimane Prefecture, Japan
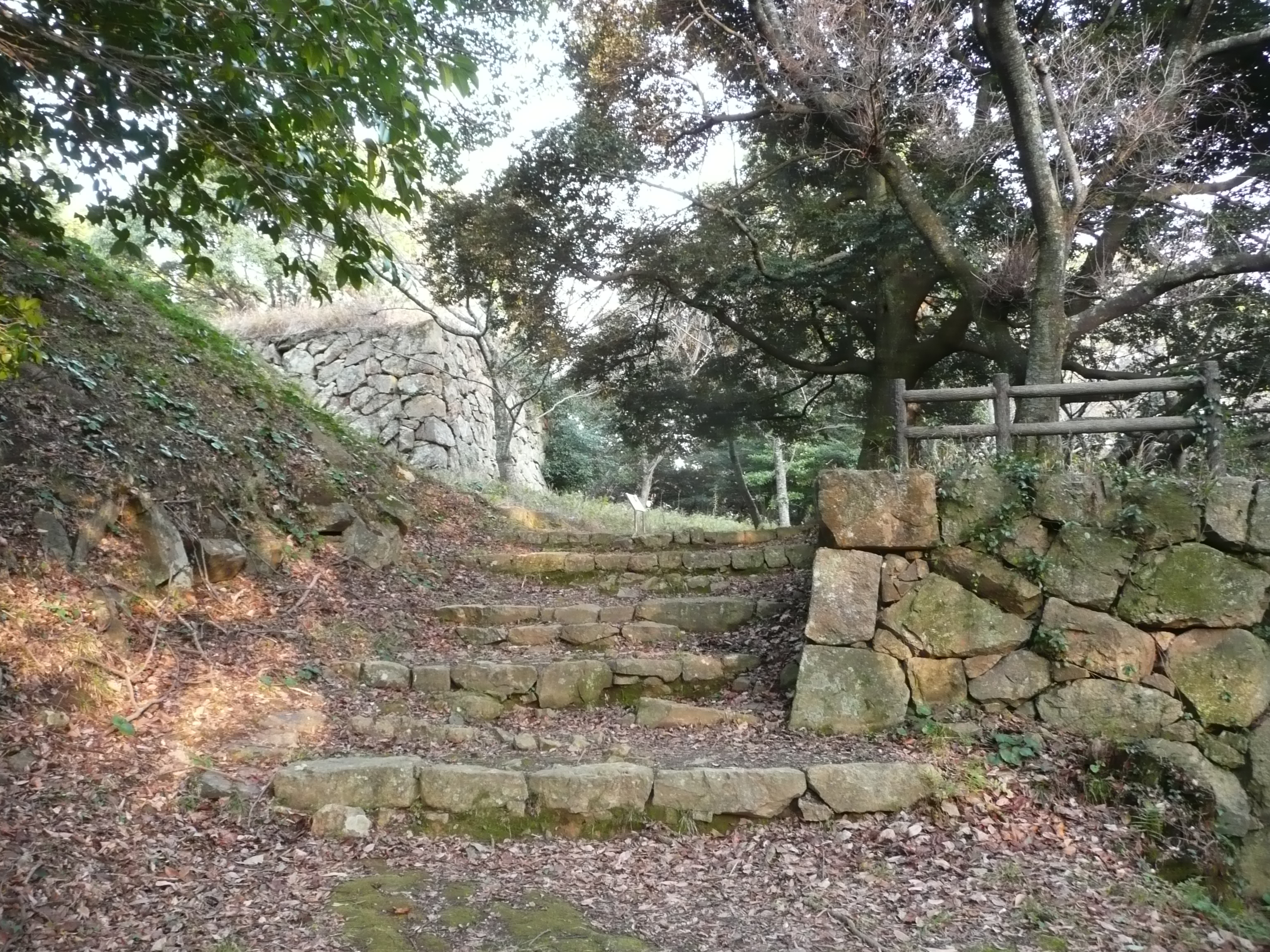
- Stone wall of Sannomaru base

Site information
- Type: Mountaintop-style castle
- Owner: Honda clan
- Condition: ruins

Location
- Location within Shimane Prefecture Location within Japan
- Coordinates: 34°54′10″N 132°04′24″E

Site history
- Built: 1620
- Built by: Furuta Shigeharu
- Materials: Stone walls
- Demolished: 1866

Garrison information
- Past commanders: Furuta Shigeharu

Hamada Castle (浜田城, Hamada-jō) is a castle structure in Hamada, Shimane Prefecture, Japan.

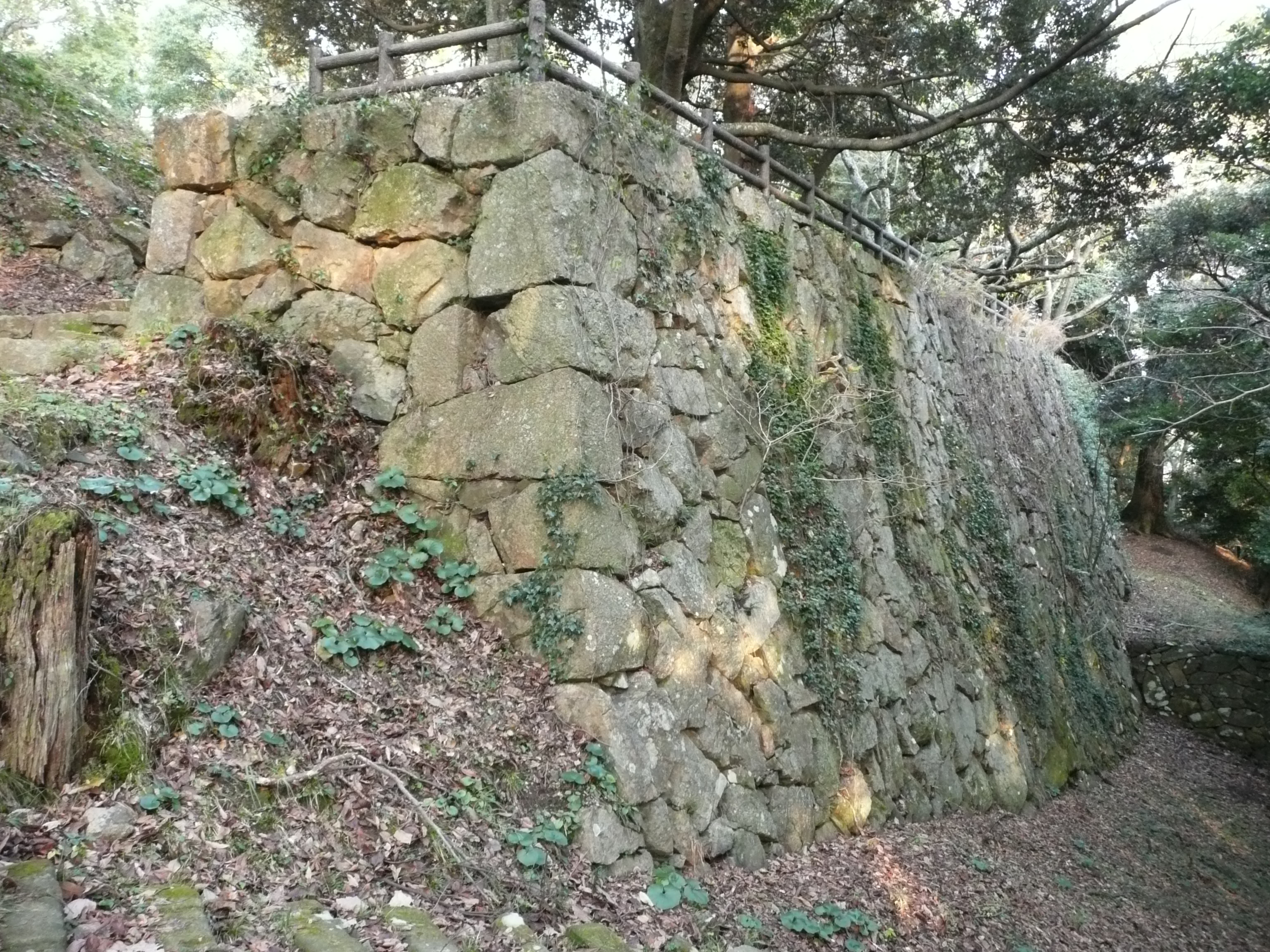
Stone wall of Sannomaru base

== Current ==
The castle is now only ruins, with some stone walls and earthworks. In 2017, the castle was listed as one of the Continued Top 100 Japanese Castles.

== Gokoku Shrine ==
Hamada Gokoku Shrine
- 濱田護國神社
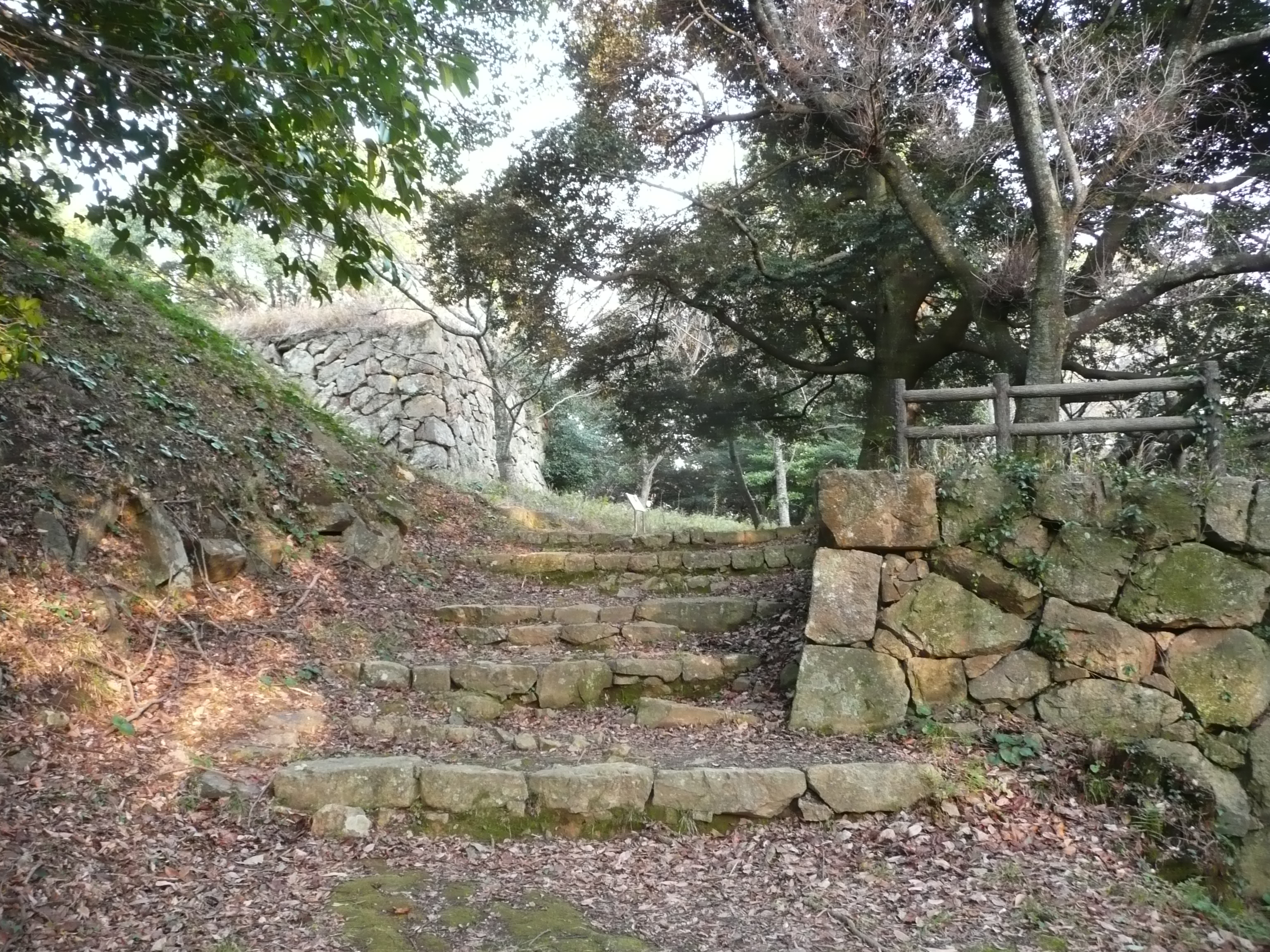

- Location within Japan

Religion
- Affiliation: Shinto
- Type: Gokoku shrine (Formerly Shokonsha)

Location
- Interactive map of Hamada Gokoku Shrine

Hamada Gokoku Shrine is a Shinto shrine located in Japan. It is a Beppyo shrine, or a shrine that is particularly notable in a certain way with a significant history to it. It is a Gokoku Shrine, or a shrine dedicated to war dead. Such shrines were made to serve to enshrine the war dead, and they were all considered "branches" of Yasukuni Shrine. They were renamed from Shokonsha in 1939. It is located in the ruins of Hamada Castle.

== See also ==
- Controversies surrounding Yasukuni Shrine
- Hero shrine
- Martial temple and Wen Wu temple
- National Revolutionary Martyrs' Shrine
- Eternal Spring Shrine
- Chinese Cultural Renaissance
- Ancestral shrine
- Gallant Garden
- Gokoku Shrines
- Tomb of the Unknown Soldier
- Arlington National Cemetery
- Valhalla (home to the souls of fallen warriors in Scandinavian mythology)
- Walhalla Shrine (a hall of fame in Germany honoring "commendable and honorable Germans")
- Eternal Spring Shrine
- The common end of myriad good deeds
- Greek hero cult

== Literature ==
- De Lange, William (2021). An Encyclopedia of Japanese Castles. Groningen: Toyo Press. pp. 600 pages. ISBN 978-9492722300.
