= Gokoku shrines =

Japanese shrines for war dead

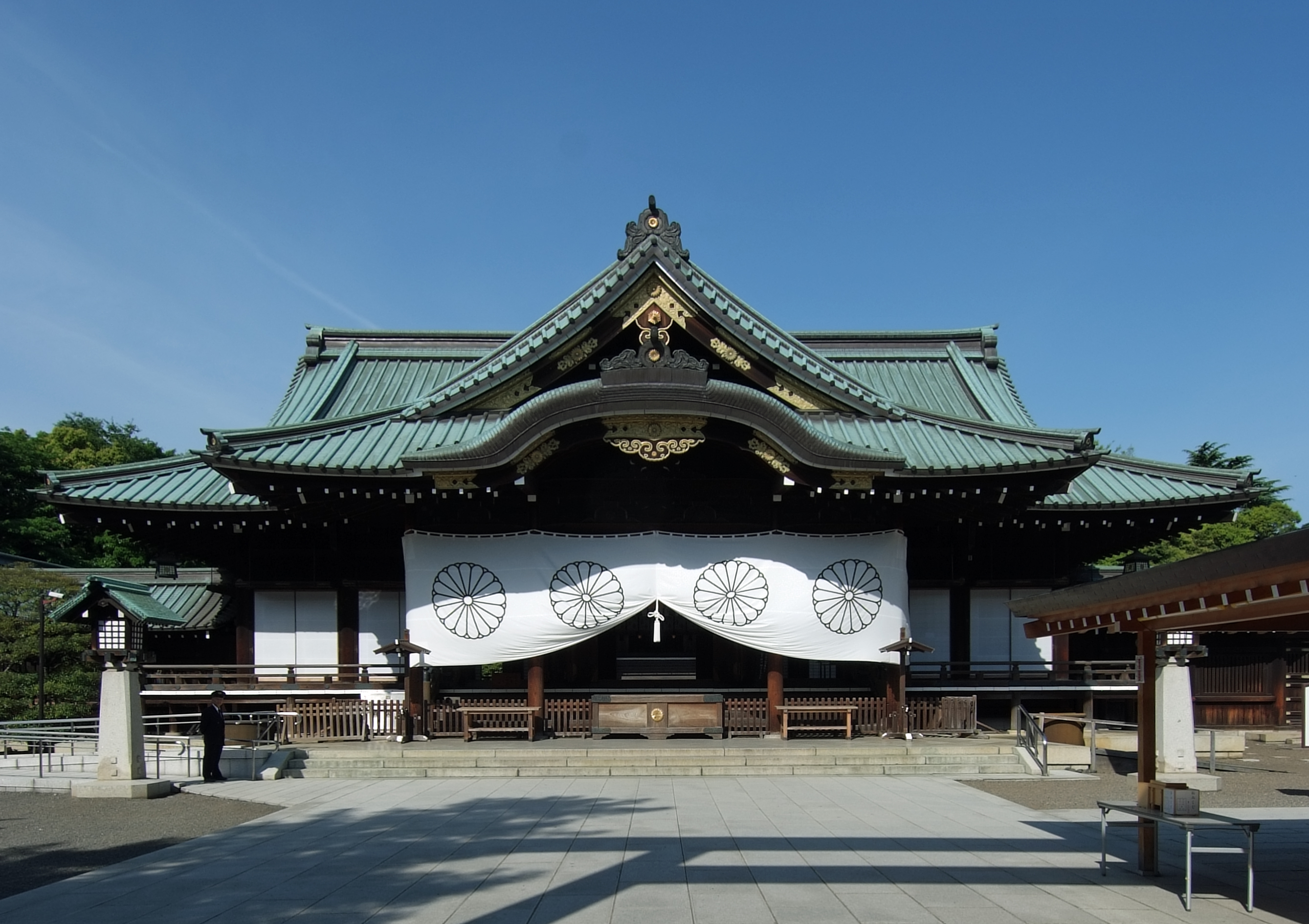
Yasukuni shrine the historical head shrine of the Gokoku shrines

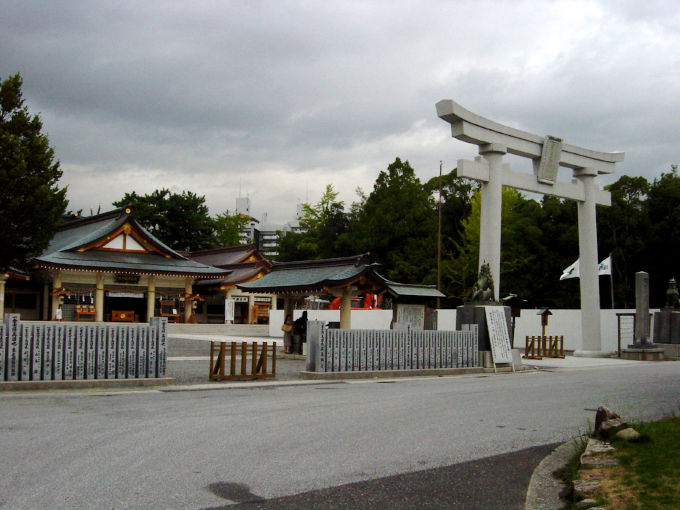
Hiroshima Gokoku Shrine, one of the most popular shrines in Hiroshima

A Gokoku shrine (Japanese: 護国神社, romanized: Gokokujinja, lit. 'national defense shrines') is a shrine dedicated to the spirit of those who died for the nation. They were renamed from Shōkonsha (招魂社) in 1939 (Showa 14). Before World War II, they were under the jurisdiction of the Ministry of the Interior, but after World War II they are administered by an independent religious corporation. (Note: 日本大百科全書. "護国神社". コトバンク. 株式会社DIGITALIO. 2021年11月22日閲覧。) Designated Gokoku Shrines were built in prefectures except Tokyo and Kanagawa Prefecture. (Note: Miyazaki Gokoku Shrine and Kumamoto Gokoku Shrine were completed after World War II, when the war ended and the Ministry of Home Affairs was abolished, so they were not designated by the Minister of Home Affairs and are actually correctly designated as "equivalent to designated Gokoku-jinja Shrine.) The main deities are war dead from the prefecture or those who are related to them, as well as self-defense officers, police officers, firefighters, and others killed in the line of duty.

Such shrines were made to serve to enshrine the war dead, and they were all considered "branches" of Yasukuni Shrine. They were originally called Shokonsha but renamed to Gokoku shrines in 1939.

They are considered the Japanese equivalent of the Martyrs' shrines of other Asian cultures.

== History ==
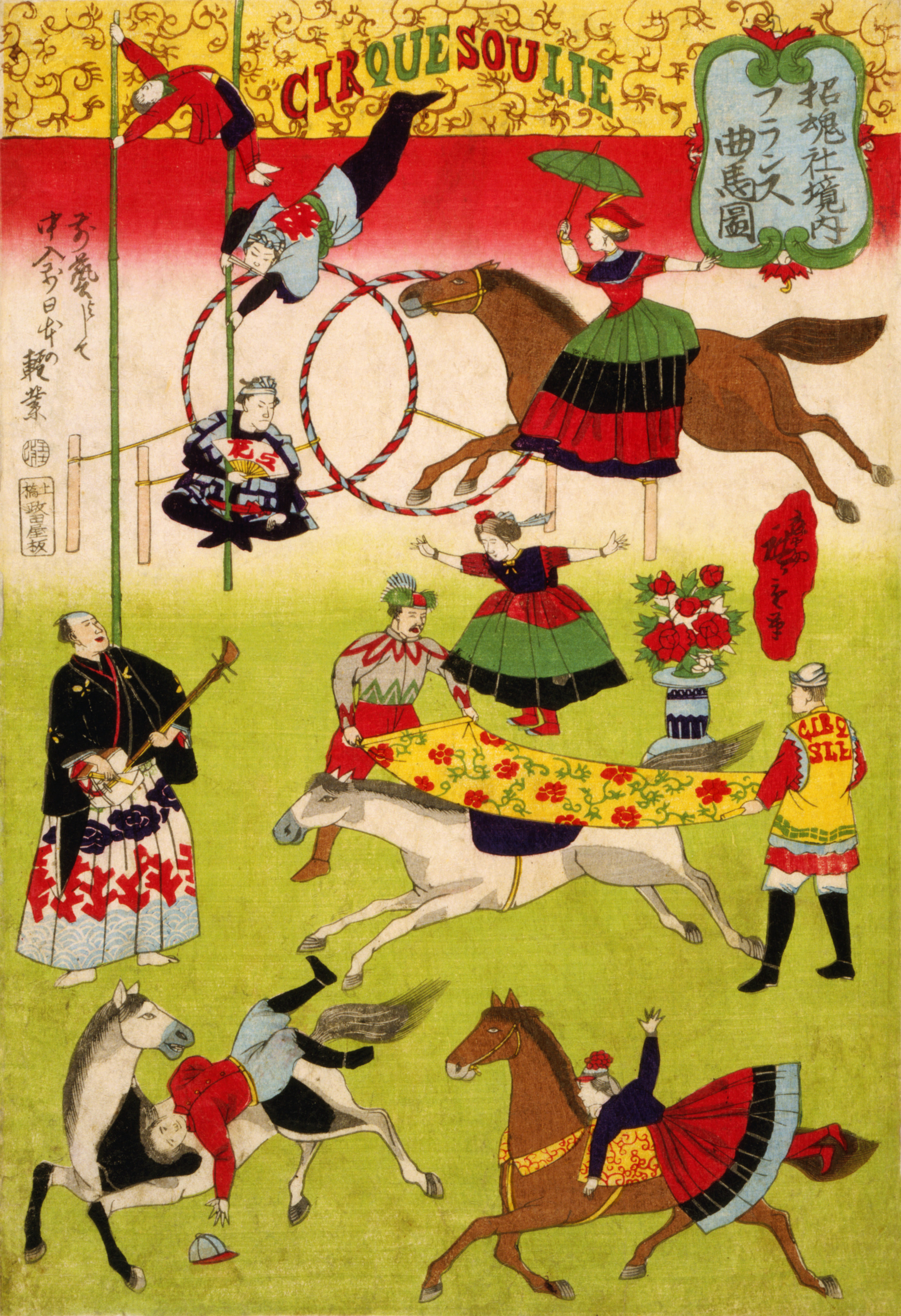
Horse racing at Tokyo Shokonsha in 1871

The Chōshū Domain and Satsuma Domain in the Bakumatsu era established a place for the spirits of the martyrs and war dead of national affairs, and held a ceremony to honor them. The Royal court also held a Satsuma Domain ceremony to honor the spirits of the martyrs and war dead in 1868 June 29 (10 May, Keio 4), in accordance with the Dajokanbunsho, Article 385 refers to 1853 (Kaei 6). The Hokora (Reizan Kansai Shokonsha, later Kyoto Ryozen Gokoku Shrine). On 21 July of the same year (2 June, Keiō 4/the first year of Meiji), Chikahito Arisugawa, the Grand Governor of the Eastern Expedition, held a ceremony in the hall of Edo Castle to honor the war dead of the government forces. Similarly, domains and other local feudal lords held ceremonies for the war dead of their clansmen or at places where they were related to them. The following year, 1869 (the 2nd year of Meiji), "Tokyo Shokonsha" (later Yasukuni Shrine) was built on Kudanzaka in Tokyo to enshrine the war dead since the Boshin Senso.

With the abolition of the han system of 1871 (Meiji 4), private temples built by former feudal lords or the people were placed under the jurisdiction of the new Meiji government, and in 1874 (Meiji 7), it was decided to exempt temples from land tax and to pay for ritual fees and repairs at government expense. In 1875 (Meiji 8), it was decided to enshrine the spirits of the dead since 1853 (Kaei 6) at the Tokyo Shokonsha. The shrine names were unified to Shokonsha while the various places of worship remained in place as before. On 4 June 1879, Tokyo Shokonsha was renamed Yasukuni Jinja. The name Yasukuni, quoted from the phrase「吾以靖國也 in the classical-era Chinese text Zuo Zhuan (Scroll 6, 23rd Year of Duke Xi), literally means "Pacifying the Nation" and was chosen by the Meiji Emperor. It was listed as a Bekkaku Kanpeisha in the modern system of ranked Shinto shrines.

=== Shokonsha ===
Gokoku shrines (shokonsha) originated in the Meiji Restoration when it was observed that the concept of honoring war dead was present in the Western world but not in Japan. This was particularly noteworthy with the 1874 Japanese invasion of Taiwan in which only 12 people were enshrined in Yasukuni Shrine.

Yasukuni Shrine was formerly called Tokyo Shokonsha and was a part of a general system across Imperial Japan.

The fundamental principle behind the Shokonsha system is that it is designed to enshrine people as heroes regardless of their status before their deaths.

The Shokonsha system became much more seriously implemented with the Satsuma Rebellion in 1877 from which 6,959 people were enshrined.

=== First Sino-Japanese War to Second Sino-Japanese War ===
The enshrinement of war dead at Yasukuni was transferred to military control in 1887. As the Empire of Japan expanded, Okinawans, Ainu, and Koreans were enshrined at Yasukuni alongside ethnic Japanese. Emperor Meiji refused to allow the enshrinement of Taiwanese due to the organized resistance that followed the Treaty of Shimonoseki, but Taiwanese were later admitted due to the need to conscript them during World War II.

In 1901 (34th year of the Meiji era), it was stipulated that the "kansai" (government festival) be attached to the shōkonsha that were eligible for government funding, and shōkonsha that were not eligible for funding were distinguished by the term "privately funded shōkonsha". After the First Sino-Japanese War and Russo-Japanese War, the number of applications for the creation of privately funded shōkonsha (private rite shōkonsha) increased, and the Shrine Bureau of the Ministry of the Interior issued a new regulation in 1907 (Meiji 40), which read The "Shokonsha Establishment" (23 February 1907, Secret Letter No. 16, by order of the Director-General of the Home Ministry's Bureau of Shinto Shrines) established the criteria for establishing a shokonsha and restricted its establishment to those who were enshrined at Yasukuni Shrine, thereby discouraging its establishment. However, in 1931 (Showa 6), the Mukden Incident occurred, and in 1937 (Showa 12), the Sino-Japanese War, there was a growing demand in many areas to enshrine the spirits of the war dead in their hometowns.

In the 1930s the Gokoku Shrine system was developed with rising militarism to impose more control over the memorialization of war dead.

In 1939 (Showa 14), the "Notice Concerning the Establishment of Shokonsha" (3 February, Showa 14, 1939, No. 30, letter from the Director-General of the Bureau of Shrines) authorized the establishment of only one shrine in each prefecture, with a few exceptions.

=== Renaming ===
Gokoku Shrines were established by the Promulgation of 15 March 1939 and the Coming into force of 1 April in Showa 14. The name "Shokonsha" was changed to Gokoku Shrine because there was a contradiction in the name, since "Shokonsha" refers to a temporary or temporary ritual and "Sha" refers to a permanent facility. The name "Gokoku" was coined from the phrase "I wish to establish a foundation for the protection of the nation" (Note: Go (護) means protect and koku (国) means nation) in the draft order rescript of 28 December 1872 (28 November 1872) and in the 4 January 1882 Imperial Rescript to Soldiers and Sailors, "If you devote yourself to the protection of the nation," etc., was adopted because it was the most appropriate way to praise the deeds of the deities and because it was familiar to people who had already used terms such as "heroic spirit of national defense" and the like. The total number of Gokoku Shrines is estimated to be 131 as of April 1939 (Showa 14).

The status of the shrine was determined in accordance with Article 1, Paragraph 1 of the "Shinto Shrines under Prefectural Shrines" (No. 22 of the Edict of 1894), which was revised at the same time as the introduction of the Gokoku Shrine System. They are divided into designated Gokoku Shrines, which correspond to prefectural shrines designated by the Minister of Home Affairs, and undesignated Gokoku Shrines, which correspond to other village shrines.

=== After World War II ===
Following World War II the system was privatized, but the Gokoku shrines and Yasukuni Shrine still exist today and can be seen as continuations of the Shokonsha system.

With the acceptance of the Potsdam Declaration in August 1945, Japan became the first country to receive the occupation, Gokoku Shrine was considered a militarist institution and had to be renamed, for example, by removing the word "Gokoku" from its name, to ensure its continued existence. (Note: Among the designated Gokoku Shrines, Aomori Gokoku Shrine, Wakayama Gokoku Shrine, and Tokushima Gokoku Shrine, which was destroyed by fire during the war, did not change their names and kept the name "Gokoku Shrine.) When the Treaty of San Francisco went into effect in 1952 and Japan regained its sovereignty, the majority of the renamed shrines returned to their former names. After World War II, some of the designated shrines of the Jinja Honcho became Beppyo shrines.

Although some of the deities of each shrine overlap with those of Yasukuni Shrine, (Note: Yasukuni Shrine also enshrines the war dead as Heroic Spirits and was renamed from Tokyo Shokonsha, but includes Empire of the Empire of Japan, subjects, Koreans, Taiwanese, etc. The difference is that people from anywhere are eligible to be enshrined.) the deities of each shrine are not separated from Yasukuni Shrine, and they perform their own rituals by inviting the souls of their own deities. (Note: There are some exceptions, such as Hida Gokoku Shrine in Gifu Prefecture and Iki Gokoku Shrine in Nagasaki Prefecture.) Therefore, officially, Gokoku Shrine is "not in a headquarter branch relationship with Yasukuni Shrine. However, Yasukuni Shrine and Gokoku Shrine, which both enshrine the spirits of the dead, are deeply involved and have various exchanges. Zenkoku Gokoku Jinja-kai (formerly Urayasu-kai), organized by 52 major Gokoku Shrines, works in cooperation with Yasukuni Shrine and conducts various activities to honor the spirits of the dead. The Okinawa Gokoku-jinja Shrine also enshrines the dead of the Battle of Okinawa, including ordinary residents, schoolchildren in distress, and civilian war dead. In addition, about 10,000 mobilized students and female volunteer corps members who were victims of the Atomic bomb are also enshrined as deities at Hiroshima Gokoku Shrine.

After the issuance of the Shinto Directive by GHQ after World War II, the state no longer had the authority to direct and supervise shrines, and the decree stipulating that the deities of Gokoku Shrine were the deities of Yasukuni Shrine expired.

Perhaps due to the lapse of the law and the suggestion of Hideo Kishimoto Tokyo Imperial University, then assistant professor of the Faculty of Letters, some Gokoku Shrines began to dedicate other deities than Yasukuni Shrine to be enshrined in the Gokoku Shrines. In total, there are 23 Gokoku Shrines enshrining local greats and Self Defense Force officers who died in the line of duty in Sapporo, Akita, Niigata, Fukushima, Tochigi, Yamanashi, Nagano, Toyama, Ishikawa, Fukui, Matsue, Ehime, Kagawa, Tokushima, Kochi, Yamaguchi, Saga, Oita, Nagasaki, Kumamoto, Miyazaki, Kagoshima and Okinawa.

According to "A Consideration of the Enshrinement of Martyred Self-Defense Forces at Gokoku Shrine" by Daishi Shimaya, "In most Gokoku Shrines, when deities other than Yasukuni Shrine are enshrined, they are enshrined in a separate deity body from the main shrine, and are clearly distinguished. This is a clear distinction.

In 1960, Emperor Showa and Empress Kōjun bestowed the sacred objects to 52 shrines of the Gokoku Shrines throughout Japan, and since then the gifts have continued every 10 years since 1945.

Gokoku Shrines have traditionally been supported by the Bereaved Families Association and the War Alumni Association of war dead individuals, who provided operational and financial support. However, as the number of bereaved families and war veterans with direct knowledge of the deceased has declined, there has been a decrease in support for Gokoku Shrines, which is expected to lead to financial difficulties. To address this issue, some Gokoku Shrines have established a new association to promote reverence and veneration.

One example of a Gokoku Shrine that faced challenges is the Meguro Gokoku Shrine in Tokyo's Meguro Ward. The shrine was previously managed by the Meguro Gokoku Shrine Venerable Society, which was established in 1959. However, the staff responsible for the shrine died and the land was sold. An audit found the building had been destroyed, and it was subsequently demolished in May 2008.

== Controversy ==
After the establishment of the Japan Self-Defense Forces, the JSDF also began to enshrine at Gokoku Shrine those JSDF officers who had died in the line of duty. The first time, the number of people who were killed in the war was increased to 1,000. However, as before World War II, both enshrinement and application for enshrinement were made without seeking the consent of the bereaved families, so the wives of fallen SDF officers who are Christians could file claims for cancellation of enshrinement and Damages on the grounds that their religious Personality rights had been violated.

== List of Gokoku Shrines ==
name	location	Beppyo	notes
Yasukuni Shrine	Tokyo	no	Traditional head shrine
Miyagi Gokoku Shrine	Sendai Aoba-ku, Sendai	yes	
Akita Prefecture Gokoku Shrine	Akita (city)	yes	
Yamagata Prefecture Gokoku Shrine	Yamagata	yes	
Fukushima Gokoku Shrine	Fukushima	yes	
Ibaraki Prefectural Gokoku Shrine	Mito, Ibaraki	yes	
Gunma Gokoku Shrine	Takasaki	yes	
Chiba Gokoku Shrine	Chiba (city) Chūō-ku, Chiba	yes	
Niigata Gokoku Shrine	Niigata (city) Chūō-ku, Niigata	yes	
Toyama Gokoku Shrine	Toyama city	yes	
Ishikawa Gokoku Shrine	Kanazawa	yes	
Fukui Gokoku Shrine	Fukui (city)	yes	
Yamanashi Gokoku Shrine	Kōfu	yes	
Nagano Gokoku Shrine	Matsumoto, Nagano	yes	
Gifu Gokoku Shrine	Gifu	yes	
Shizuokaken Gokoku Shrine	Aoi Ward, Shizuoka City	yes	
Aichi Gokoku Shrine	Naka-ku, Nagoya	yes	
Mie Prefecture Gokoku Shrine	Tsu, Mie	yes	
Shiga Prefecture Gokoku Shrine	Hikone, Shiga	yes	
Kyoto Ryozen Gokoku Shrine	Higashiyama Ward, Kyoto City, Kyoto Prefecture	yes	
Osaka Gokoku Shrine	Suminoe-ku, Osaka	yes	
Hyogo Himeji Gokoku Shrine	Himeji	yes	
Hyogo Prefecture Kobe Gokoku Shrine	Nada-ku, Kobe	yes	
Nara Gokoku Shrine	Nara (city)	yes	
Matsue Gokoku Shrine	Matsue	yes	
Hamada Gokoku Shrine	Hamada, Shimane	yes	
Okayama Gokoku Shrine	Naka-ku, Okayama	yes	
Bingo Gokoku Shrine	Fukuyama, Hiroshima	yes	
Hiroshima Gokoku Shrine	Naka-ku, Hiroshima	yes	
Yamaguchi Prefecture Gokoku Shrine	Yamaguchi (city)	yes	
Tokushima Gokoku Shrine	Tokushima (city)	yes	
Ehime Prefecture Gokoku Shrine	Matsuyama	yes	
Kochi Gokoku Shrine	Kōchi (city)	yes	
Fukuoka Prefecture Gokoku Shrine	Chūō-ku, Fukuoka	yes	
Saga Gokoku Shrine	Saga (city)	yes	
Nagasaki Gokoku Shrine	Nagasaki	yes	
Oita Gokoku Shrine	Ōita (city)	yes	
Kagoshima Prefecture Gokoku Shrine	Kagoshima	yes	
Miyazaki Gokoku Shrine	Miyazaki	yes	Not a proper Gokoku Shrine but listed as equivalent due to having been finished after the war
Kumamoto Gokoku Shrine	Kumamoto	yes	Not a proper Gokoku Shrine but listed as equivalent due to having been finished after the war
Okinawa Gokoku Shrine	Okinawa	no	
Hida Gokoku Shrine	Takayama, Gifu	no	
Aomori Gokoku Shrine	Aomori	no	
Wakayama Gokoku Shrine	Wakayama (city)	no	
Meguro Gokoku Shrine	Meguro	no	
Iki Gokoku Shrine	Iki, Nagasaki	no	
Kagawa Gokoku Shrine	Zentsūji, Kagawa	no	
Kawanami Gokoku Shrine	Kawaminami, Miyazaki	no	
Saitama Gokoku Shrine	Saitama (city)	no	
Sapporo Gokoku Shrine	Sapporo	no	
Tanao Gokoku Shrine	Hekinan	no	
Tochigi Gokoku Shrine	Tochigi (city)	no	
Nōhi Gokoku Shrine	Ōgaki, Gifu	no	
Hakodate Gokoku Shrine	Hakodate	no	
Matsumae Gokoku Shrine	Matsumae, Hokkaido	no	
Taiwan Gokoku Shrine	Taiwan	no	

== See also ==
- State Shinto
- War memorial
- Takashi Sunami
- Martyrs' shrines (China)
- Martial temple and Wen Wu temple
- National Revolutionary Martyrs' Shrine
- Eternal Spring Shrine
- Chinese Cultural Renaissance
- Ancestral shrine
- Gallant Garden
- Tomb of the Unknown Soldier
- Arlington National Cemetery
- Valhalla (home to the souls of fallen warriors in Scandinavian mythology)
- Walhalla Shrine (a hall of fame in Germany honoring "commendable and honorable Germans")
- Eternal Spring Shrine
- The common end of myriad good deeds
- Greek hero cult

== Bibliography ==
- 内務省神社局編『神社法令輯覧』、帝國地方行政學會、1925年
- 内務省神社局「護国神社制度の確立」『週報』第131號、内閣情報部、1939年4月19日號、2–8頁（週報 第131号 – 国立公文書館デジタルアーカイブ）
- 森幸雄 (March 2003). "護国神社を事例とする、都市のシンボル的施設に対するイメージの変遷". Sociologica. 27 (第1, 2合併号). 創価大学: 25–45.
- 全國護國神社會監修 山中浩市著 (1 November 2013). 全国護国神社巡拝ガイドブック. かざひの文庫（販売：太陽出版）. ISBN 978-4-88469-791-4.
