= Nagasaki Gokoku Shrine =

Shrine in Nagasaki

- Location within Japan

Religion
- Affiliation: Shinto
- Type: Gokoku shrine (formerly Shokonsha)
- Year consecrated: 1869

Location
- Location: 41-67 Joeimachi, Nagasaki, Nagasaki Prefecture
- Interactive map of Nagasaki Gokoku Shrine
- Coordinates: 32°46′41.61″N 129°51′19.59″E

Website
- Official website

Nagasaki Gokoku Shrine (Japanese: 長崎護国神社) is a Gokoku Shrine located in Nagasaki, Nagasaki Prefecture, Japan. It is dedicated to the spirits of the approximately 60,000 people from Nagasaki Prefecture who died between the Meiji Restoration and Pacific War (World War II).

It is dedicated to war dead. Such shrines were made to serve to enshrine the casualties of wars, and they were all considered "branches" of Yasukuni Shrine. They were renamed from Shokonsha in 1939.

== History ==
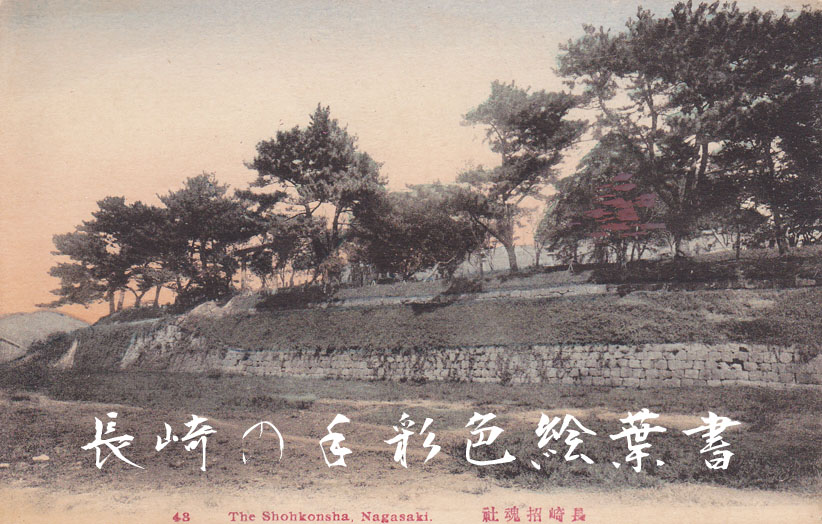
Nagasaki Shokonsha. This photo depicts the old shrine, and it was completely destroyed in the atomic bombing

The shrine was founded in 1869 in the Umegasaki district of Nagasaki as the Nagasaki Shokonsha, dedicated to the 43 samurais who died in the Boshin War. In 1874, the Saku Shokon Shrine was established in the Nishi-shima district of Nagasaki to honor the 536 people who died in the Taiwan Expedition. Both shrines merged and became the Nagasaki Gokoku Shrine in 1942, with the shrine buildings being completed in 1944. Then in August 1945, all of the shrine's buildings were destroyed in the atomic bombing of Nagasaki. The Sako Shokon Shrine (Umegasaki Tenno-miya Shrine) was temporarily located at the site of the former Sako Shokonsha. It was rebuilt in October 1963. It is designated as a National Important Cultural Property. The shrine's annual festivals are held on April 22 and October 26.

== See also ==
- Hiroshima Gokoku Shrine
- Controversies surrounding Yasukuni Shrine
- Ancestral shrine
- Tomb of the Unknown Soldier
- Eternal Spring Shrine
