= Taichung Martyrs' Shrine =

Martyrs' shrine in North, Taichung, Taiwan

- 臺中市忠烈祠

- Location within Taichung

Location
- Location: North, Taichung, Taiwan
- Coordinates: 24°09′15.8″N 120°41′28.5″E

Architecture
- Type: martyrs' shrine

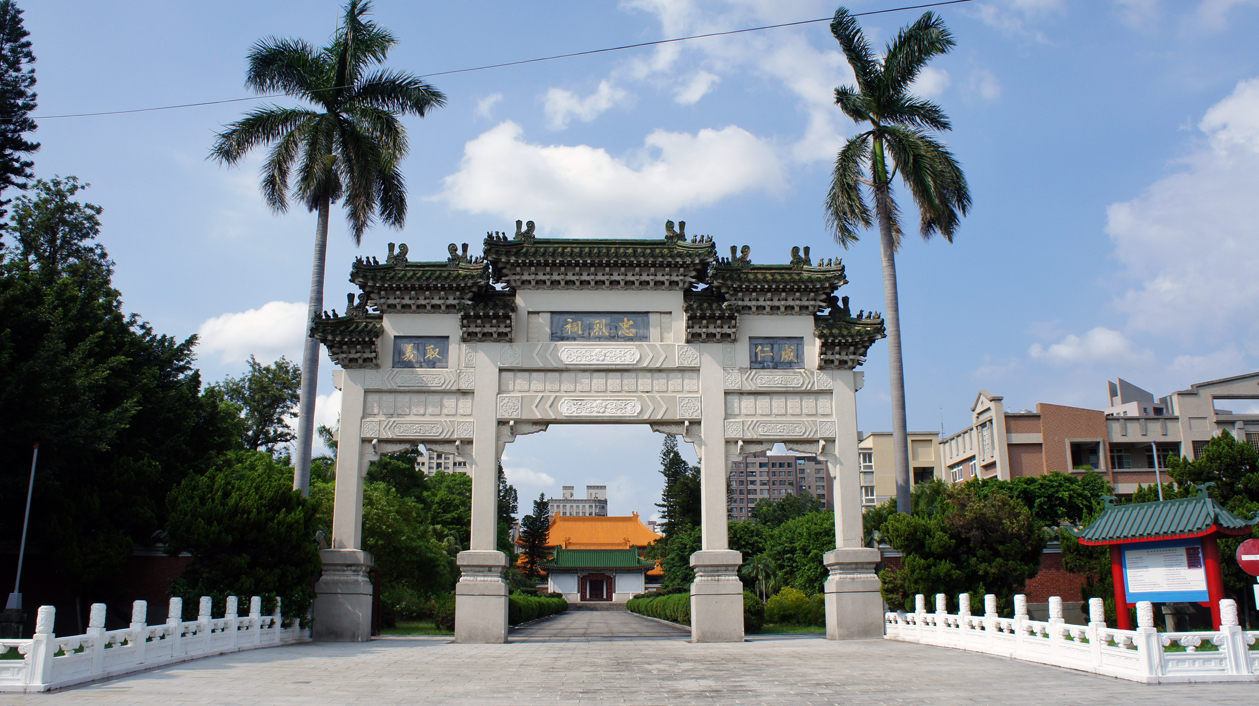
Taichung Martyrs' Shrine gate

The Taichung Martyr's Shrine (traditional Chinese: 臺中市忠烈祠; simplified Chinese: 台中市忠烈祠; pinyin: Táizhōng Shì Zhōngliècí) is a martyrs' shrine in North District, Taichung, Taiwan dedicated to heroes of the Republic of China.

== History ==
Taichu Jinja
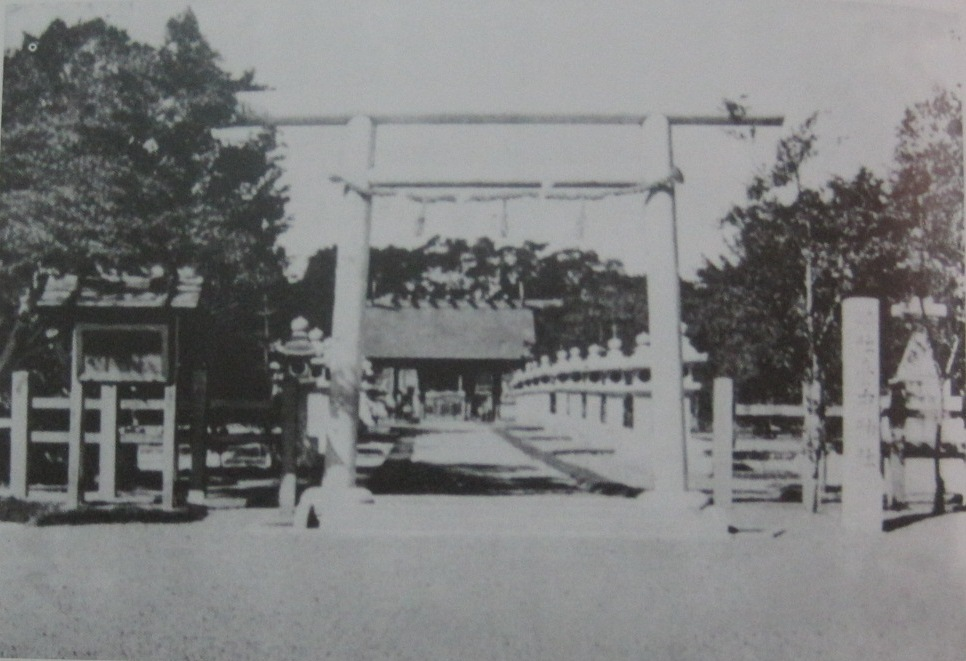

Religion
- Affiliation: Shinto
- Deity: Ōkuninushi Prince Kitashirakawa Yoshihisa Sukunabikona
- Year consecrated: 1911

Location
- Interactive map of Taichu Jinja

The shrine was originally a Shinto shrine to honor Japanese heroes. After the handover of Taiwan from Japan to the Republic of China in 1945, the Shinto shrine was reestablished and converted to a shrine that honor the National Revolutionary Army in 1970.

== Architecture ==
The shrine was constructed with traditional Chinese architecture style. It has a rectangular shape surrounded by courtyards and garden.

== Transportation ==
The shrine is accessible by bus north of Taichung Station of Taiwan Railway.

== See also ==
- National Revolutionary Martyrs' Shrine
