= Toyama Gokoku Shrine =

Shrine in Toyama, Japan

Coordinates: 36°41′23″N 137°12′04″E

- 富山縣護國神社
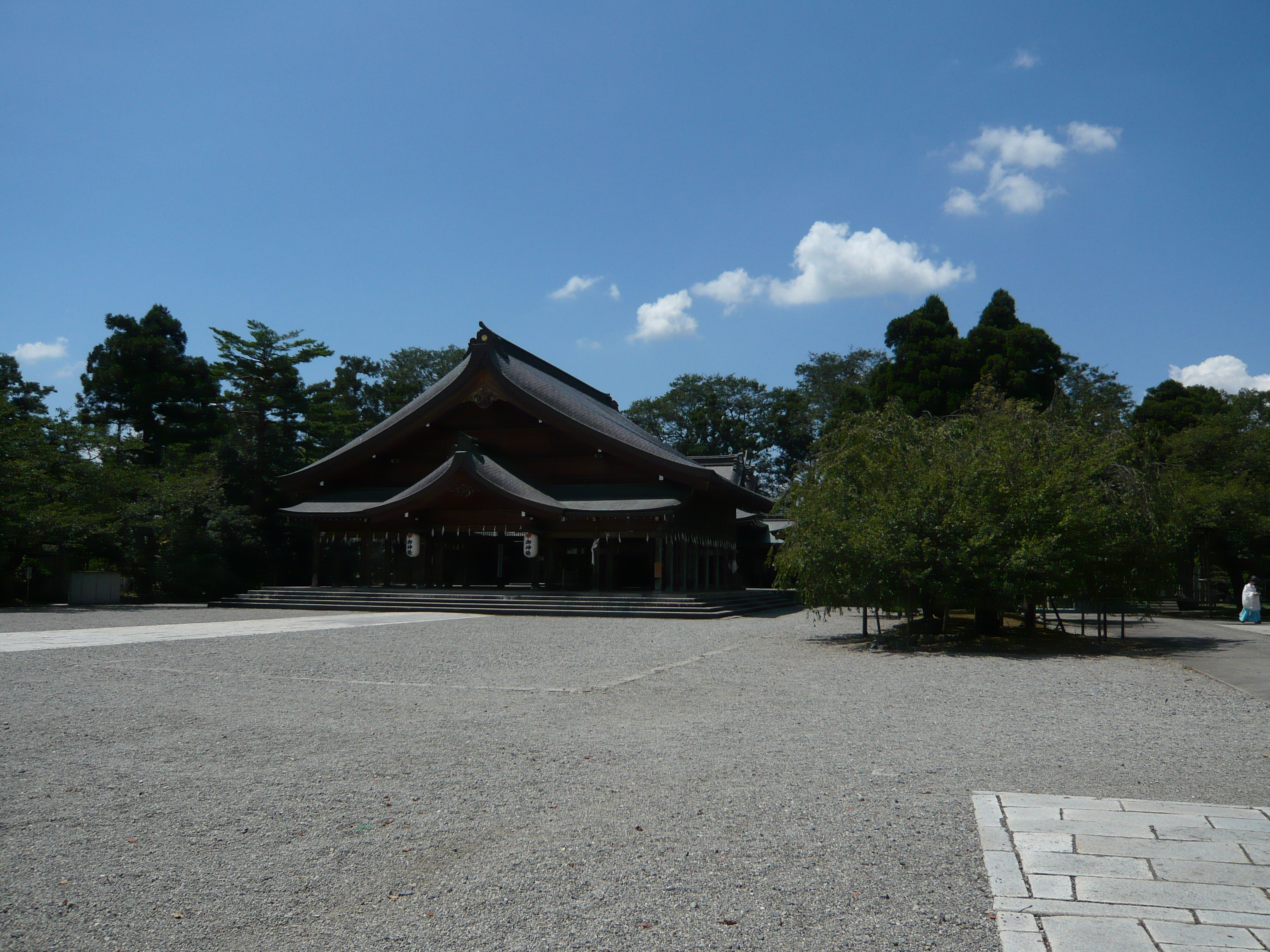

Religion
- Affiliation: Shinto
- Deity: Martyrs of the State
- Festival: April 25, October 5
- Type: Gokoku, Beppyo

Location
- Location: 1 Chome-1 Isobemachi, Toyama, 930-0077
- Country: Japan
- Interactive map of Toyama Gokoku Shrine

Architecture
- Style: Nagare-zukuri
- Established: 1913; 113 years ago

Toyama Gokoku Shrine (富山縣護國神社, Toyamaken gokoku jinja) is a Shinto shrine located in Toyama, Toyama Prefecture, Japan. It enshrines the kami of "martyrs of the state" (国事殉難者) or soldiers whom have perished and its annual festivals take place on April 25 and October 5. It was established in 1913. In total, there are 28,679 people enshrined.

== History ==
=== Founding ===
In 1912, the Toyama Gokoku Shrine was established and dedicated to those who have dies in war. The Governor at the time was the chairmen of the construction committee, and construction began in January 1912. The designated land for the shrine was approximately 3500 tsubo (Roughly 115500m^2). Construction on the shrine was finished in August 1913 and the subsequent ceremony was completed on September 18, 1913. On October 4, at 1700, the purification and topping out ceremonies - where the final beam was placed - were held and completed on September 18, 1913. On October 5, a large ceremony commemorating the completion was held.

=== Renaming (1939) ===
On April 1, 1939, accordance with the national renaming of all Shokonsha to Gokoku Shrine, Toyama Shokonsha was renamed to Toyama Gokoku Shrine.

=== Late War effects (1945) ===
In 1945, due to the Toyama Air Raids, most of the buildings of the shrine were burnt down. This included the main building and Chozuya. To preserve the records of those enshrined, the registry was moved to an air raid shelter build in Mt. Fuji and then later transferred to the Ueda Shrine.

=== Post War (1945–1950s) ===
On September 26, 1945, a temporary shrine to replace the previously burnt out shrine was being built. On October 26, 1946, multiple committee deliberations were held and, ultimately, on April 4, 1947, the shrine was renamed to "Toyama Spirit Pacification Shrine"(富山県鎮霊神社). On October 21, 1947, the temporary shrine was finished construction.

On October 24, 1951, the shrine was renamed back to Toyma Gokoku Shrine. On January 10, 1953, the main hall started construction and later on November 20, 1954, construction was completed.

=== Modern (1960s–present) ===
On July 1, 1966, the Toyama Gokoku Shrine was added to the Associations of Official shrines as an independent shrine. In 1968, the Meiji Centennial memorial garden was completed on the shrine grounds and the subsequent ceremony was held on November 24. On September 22, 1977, the Association of Toyama Prefecture Shrine Appreciation (富山縣護國神社崇敬会) was founded. On October 12, 1981, the new shrine facilities were finished construction. The current main shrine was completed in October 1991.

== The Site ==
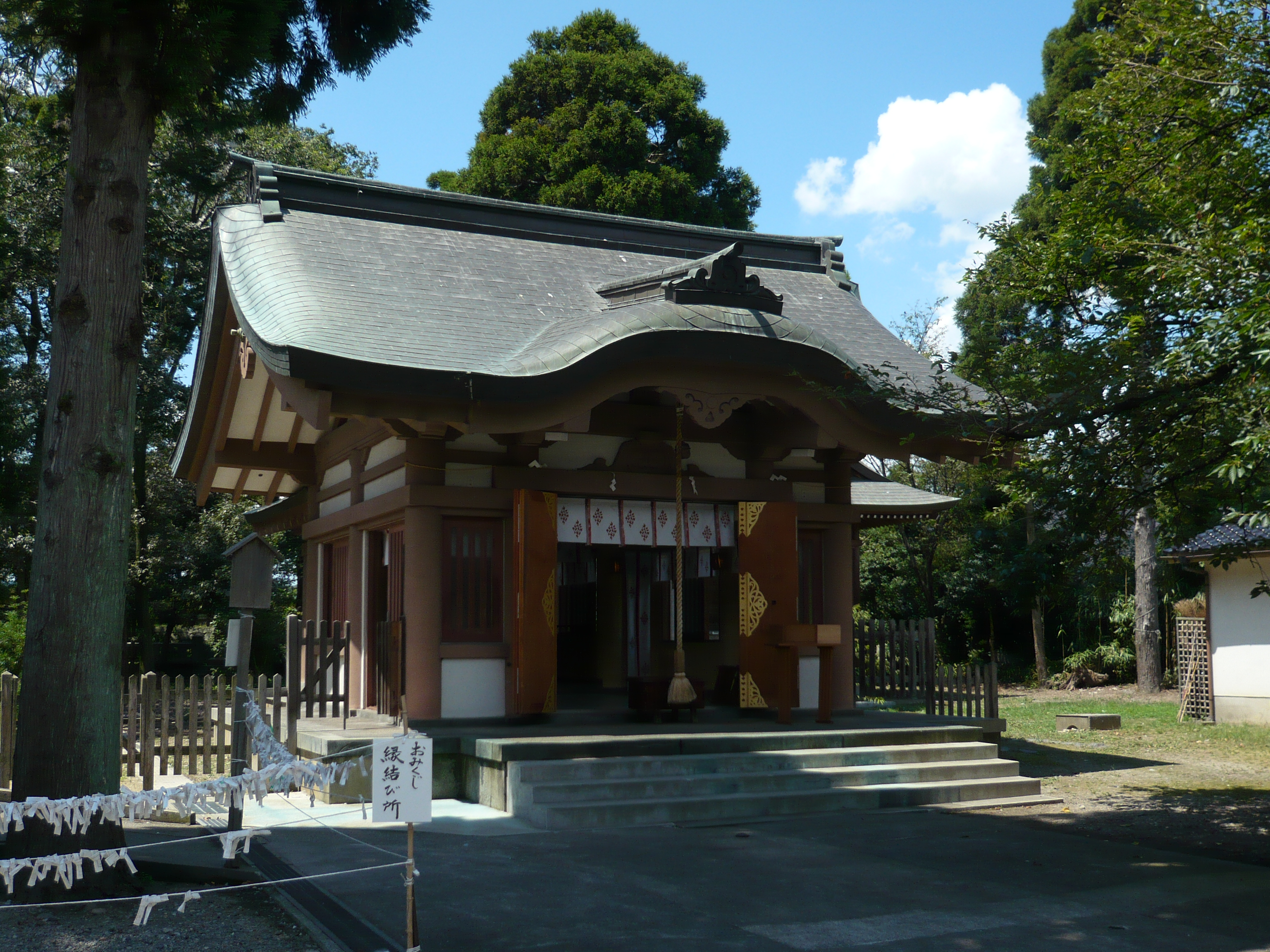
Picture of the shrine building

=== Display building ===
In the display building, the names of those who are enshrined are presented.

== Annual festivities ==
- First Sunday of February: Setsubun Festival
- February 11: National Foundation Festival
- April 25: Spring Festival
- July 31: Toyama's Temuku Festival
- August 1: 10.000 Light's Festival
- August 1: Annual Toyama Shrine Festival
- October 5: Autumn Festival
- December 23: Tencho Festival

== See also ==
- List of Shinto shrines in Japan
- Toyama Chukyoin
