= Martyrs' shrines (China) =

Chinese religious building

忠烈祠

Chinese name
- Traditional Chinese: 忠烈祠
Transcriptions

Korean name
- Hangul: 충렬사
- Hanja: 忠烈祠
Transcriptions
- Revised Romanization: Chungnyeolsa
- McCune–Reischauer: Ch'ungnyŏlsa

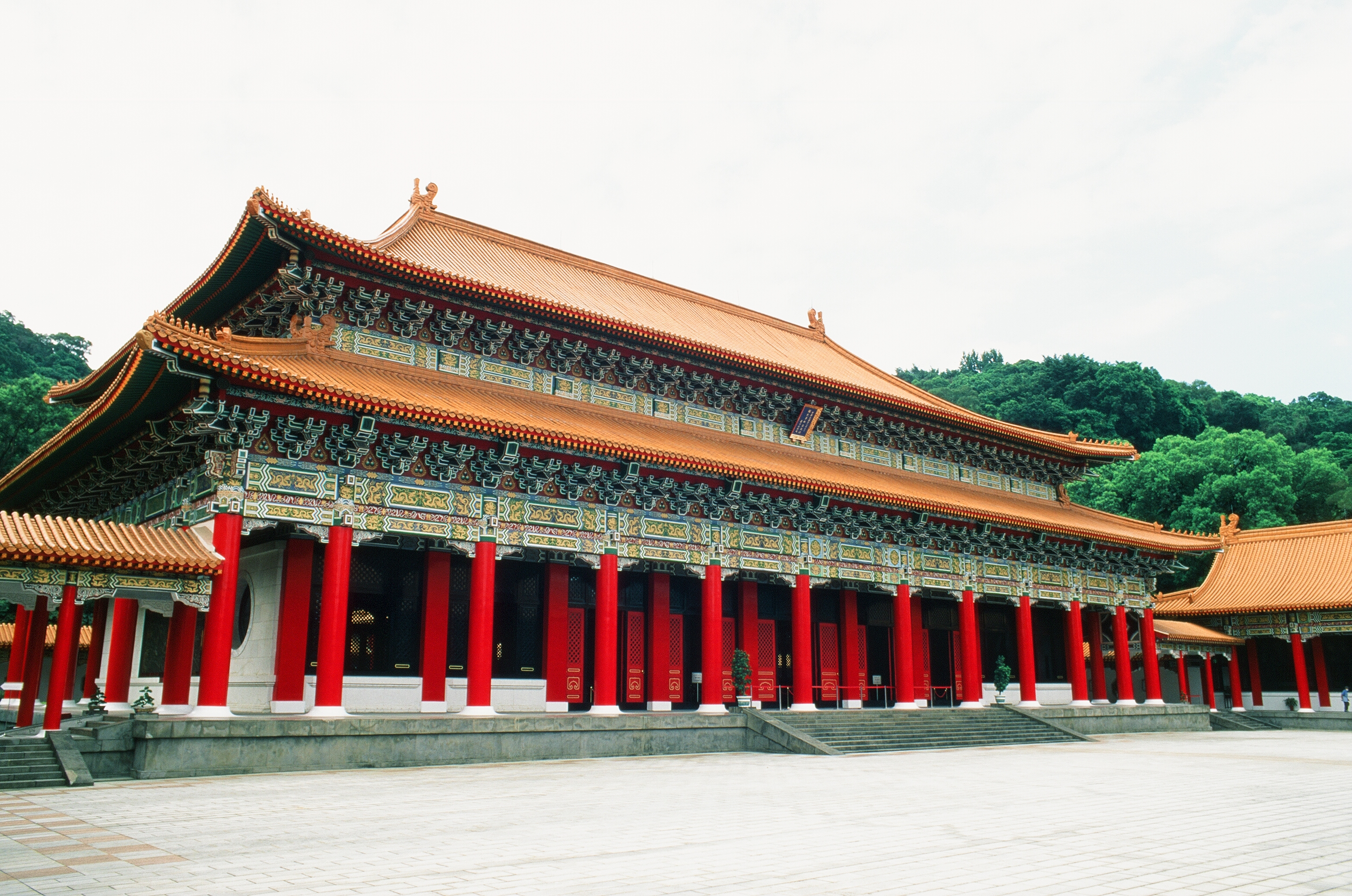
Taipei Yuanshan Loyalty Shrine

Martyrs' shrines or hero shrines (Chinese: 忠烈祠) are buildings used in East Asian hero cults. They are a kind of Ci Shrine, which is a separate building built to praise the spirit of loyalty and righteousness, and to memorialize the martyrs who died for the country. In addition to shrines dedicated to martyrs and loyal subjects, some of them are converted from other buildings, such as Shinto shrines. Since Confucianism advocates the virtues of loyalty and righteousness, the construction of the Temple not only commemorates and enshrines the martyrs who were martyred in the country, but also serves the purpose of moral education.

== History ==
In China, there were ancestral shrines dedicated to loyal subjects and martyrs, and the names of the shrines were given by the emperor. The Fayuan Temple in Beijing was built by Emperor Taizong of the Tang to commemorate the martyrs who died in his Eastern Expedition to Goguryeo.

This practice of building shrines to honor loyal and martyred soldiers, and then having them named by the monarch, also spread to other regions in the East Asian cultural sphere. After the decline of autocratic power, the hero shrines were maintained or installed by the government.

== Martyrs' shrines across the world ==
=== China ===
According to the statistics of the Ministry of the Interior of the Republic of China in 1942, more than 600 counties and cities in mainland China had already set up loyalty shrines, mostly consisting of the old Confucius Temple, Guandi Temple, City God Temple, Jizo Temple, Dongyue Temple, and even Shuangzhong Temple, Wuhou Temple, and other temples with small temples attached to them for worship. The Capital Loyalty Shrine could not be built because of the Second Sino-Japanese War, even before the Nationalist government moved to Taiwan.

In the People's Republic of China, the title of martyr is bestowed alongside enshrinement to a martyrs' shrine.

Although there were many martyrs' shrines built in China, some collapsed due to disrepair and others were destroyed during the Cultural Revolution.

Within mainland China, there exist many martyrs' shrines in which soldiers and other war heroes of China have been enshrined, from conflicts such as the Second Sino-Japanese War. These include:

- Nanyue Loyalty Shrine: Located in Hunan Hengyang, completed on July 7, 1943, it is one of the earliest and largest anti-Japanese war memorial sites in China.
- It was built in 1939 to commemorate those who died during the Battle of Changsha, and the tomb of the fallen soldiers of the Seventy-third Army, built in 1946, is located in the mountain behind the Ancestral Hall.
- Tengchong Loyalty Ancestral Hall: located in Yunnan in Tengchong County in the National Cemetery of Shame, completed on July 7, 1945, dedicated to the fallen soldiers of the 20th Group of the Chinese Expeditionary Army in the battle of Tengchong during the Second Sino-Japanese War.
- Shangcheng Loyalty Ancestral Hall: Located in the southeastern suburb of Shangcheng County, Henan Province, it was completed on July 7, 1943, and is dedicated to the fallen soldiers of the 84th Army during the Second Sino-Japanese War.

The ancient martyrs are: Xinzhou Loyalty Ancestral Hall in Shanxi Province, Xinzhou, Lujiazhuang Village, founded at an unknown date, dedicated to Gongsun Pestle and Mortar of the Jin Kingdom in the Spring and Autumn period. The Zhou Wang Temple in Wuxi Yixing, Jiangsu Province, is dedicated to Zhou Di, a Jin Dynasty general who died in the Jinxi expedition.

=== Korean Peninsula ===
The Korean Peninsula also has a number of shrines dedicated to martyrs who died during the Imjin War, such as Song Sanghyŏn, the Busan Chungyeolsa dedicated to General Chŏng Pal, the Busan Chungyeolsa dedicated to General Yi Sun-sin, the Lord of Chungmu, the Korea under Japanese rule, the Korea under Japanese rule, and the Korea. Korea's head of state, patriots, and martyrs, such as the Seoul National Cemetery in Tongjak-dong, Tongjak-gu, Seoul.

=== Vietnam ===
Influenced by Confucianism, which originated in China, Vietnam also has a number of loyalty shrines. The Martial temple in Hanoi city. Dong Dao county, a temple in the Vietnamese area of the Temple of Literature, is a Martial temple of the post-Li dynasty, built in 1685, and is dedicated to famous generals of the Vietnamese dynasty. During the Nguyen dynasty, Nguyễn Tri Phương of the French Armed Forces, the officer who sacrificed himself against the invasion of the city, was also enshrined in the temple, along with Nguyen Linh, Truong Quoc Duy, Hoang Duy, Duan Thieu, and Nguyen Gao. The Martyr's Shrine is dedicated to the fallen soldiers during the Vietnam War.

=== Japan ===
Japan set up Shōkonsha during the Imperial era to enshrine the spirits of those who donated their lives to the country, and during the war, they were all renamed Gokoku Shrines, except for Tokyo Shrine, which was renamed Yasukuni Shrine. The shrine is often considered to be a symbol of Japanese militarism. The shrine lists the names, origins, birthdates, and places of death of 2,466,532 men, women, children, and various pet animals. Among those are 1,068 convicted war criminals, 14 of whom are A-Class (convicted of having been involved in the planning, preparation, initiation, or waging of the war). This has led to many controversies surrounding the shrine.

=== Taiwan ===
Most of the existing shrines were originally converted from Shinto shrines from the Japanese era after the war by the Nationalist government, and are dedicated to officers, soldiers, police, and people who died in the line of duty for the Republic of China and have their significant loyalty deeds.

In accordance with the "Rules for the Sacrifice of Martyrs' Shrines" promulgated by the Ministry of the Interior of the R.O.C., Martyrs' Shrines are located at the seats of municipal governments in a city and county. The National Revolutionary Martyrs' Shrine is set up at the seat of the central government, and the President officiates at the shrine.

Following a 1998 legal amendment, people who were not affiliated with the military could be inducted into the shrine. Lin Ching-chuan, a teacher who died trying to save children in the 1992 Taoyuan County tour bus fire, was the first civilian to be inducted into the shrine. Several police officers and firefighters who have died in the line of duty have also been commemorated at the shrine, including Yang Chi-chang, who died in the Taiwan McDonald's bombings. Healthcare workers on duty during the Hoping Hospital lockdown of the 2003 SARS outbreak have also been inducted. Wen Yung-nan, who died in 1973 while delivering mail in the aftermath of Typhoon Nora, was the first postal worker to be inducted.

==== List of martyrs' shrines ====
- Hualien Martyrs' Shrine in Hualien
- Kaohsiung Martyrs' Shrine in Kaohsiung
- National Revolutionary Martyrs' Shrine in Taipei
- Taichung Martyrs' Shrine in Taichung
- Taoyuan Martyrs' Shrine in Taoyuan
- Taiwushan Martyrs' Shrine at Mount Taiwu
- New Taipei City Martyrs' Shrine in Tamsui, New Taipei City

=== Outside of the East Asian cultural sphere ===
Some overseas Chinese in the East Asian cultural sphere have also built martyrdom shrines in their hometowns, such as the Tangwo Martyrdom Shrine in Tangwo Village, Chiang Mai Province, Thailand, which was built by local Chinese to worship the fallen soldiers of the Lone Army of Northern Thailand Third Army. The shrine is dedicated to the fallen soldiers and sages of the Third Army of the Kuomintang in Burma.

== See also ==
- Martyr (China) & Martyrdom in Chinese culture
- Martial temple and Wen Wu temple
- Eternal Spring Shrine
- Chinese Cultural Renaissance
- Ancestral shrine
- Gallant Garden
- Tomb of the Unknown Soldier
- Arlington National Cemetery
- Valhalla (home to the souls of fallen warriors in Scandinavian mythology)
- Walhalla Shrine (a hall of fame in Germany honoring "commendable and honorable Germans")
- The common end of myriad good deeds
- Greek hero cult
- Hero of the Soviet Union
