= Miyagiken Gokoku Shrine =

Shinto shrine in Sendai, Miyagi prefecture, Japan

- 宮城縣護國神社
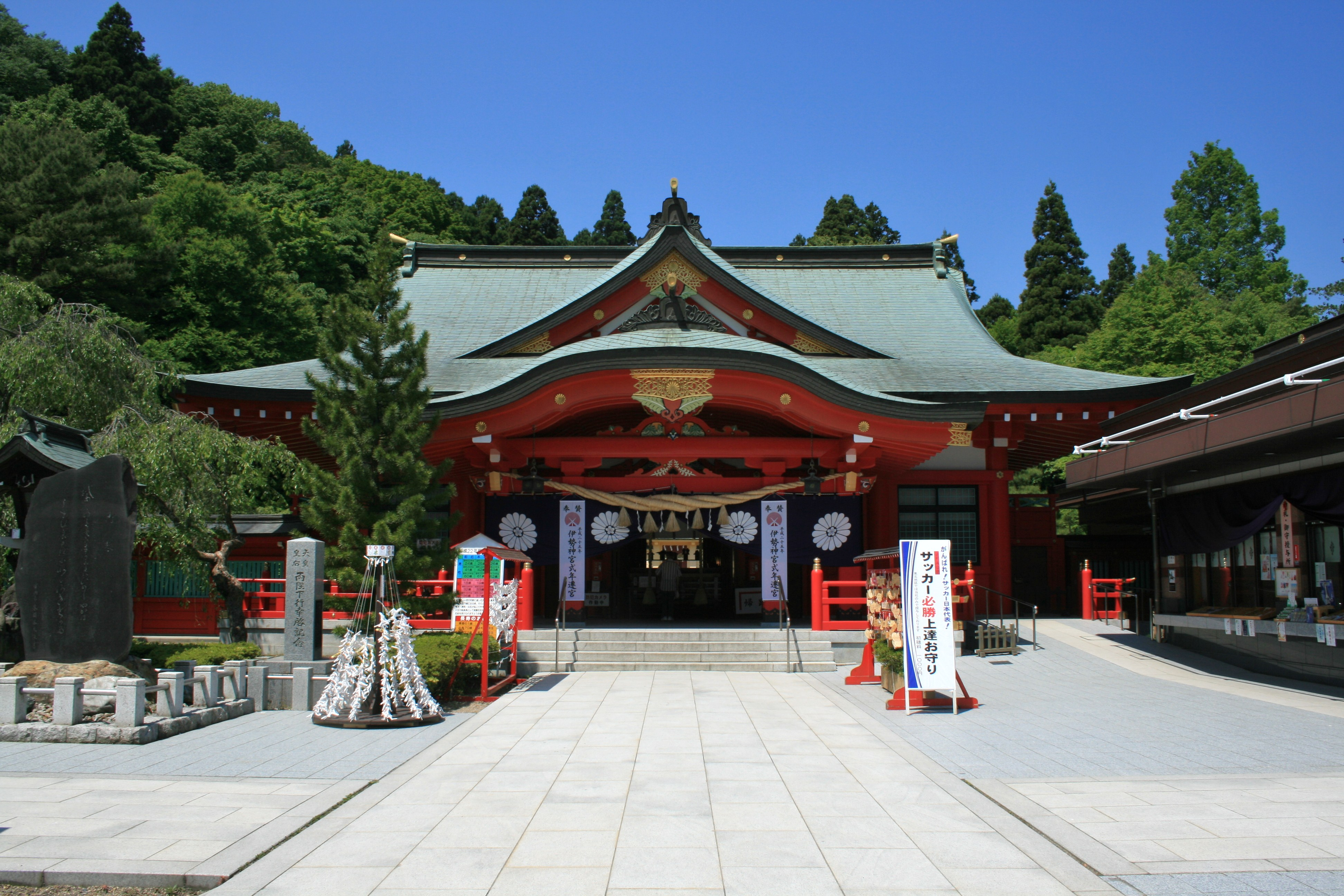

Religion
- Affiliation: Shinto
- Deity: Martyrs of the State
- Festival: April 30, May 1, October 23
- Type: Gokoku, beppyo

Location
- Location: 1 Kawauchi, Aoba Ward, Sendai, Miyagi 980-0862
- Country: Japan
- Interactive map of Miyagiken Gokoku Shrine
- Coordinates: 38°15′8.86″N 140°51′19.55″E

Architecture
- Established: 1904; 122 years ago

Miyagiken Gokoku Shrine (宮城縣護國神社, Miyagiken gokoku jinja) is a Shinto shrine located in Sendai, Miyagi Prefecture, Japan. It enshrines the kami of "martyrs of the state" (国事殉難者) and its annual festivals take place on April 30, May 1, and October 23. It was established in 1904 and originally referred to as Shōkonsha (招魂社). Its current name dates to 1939.

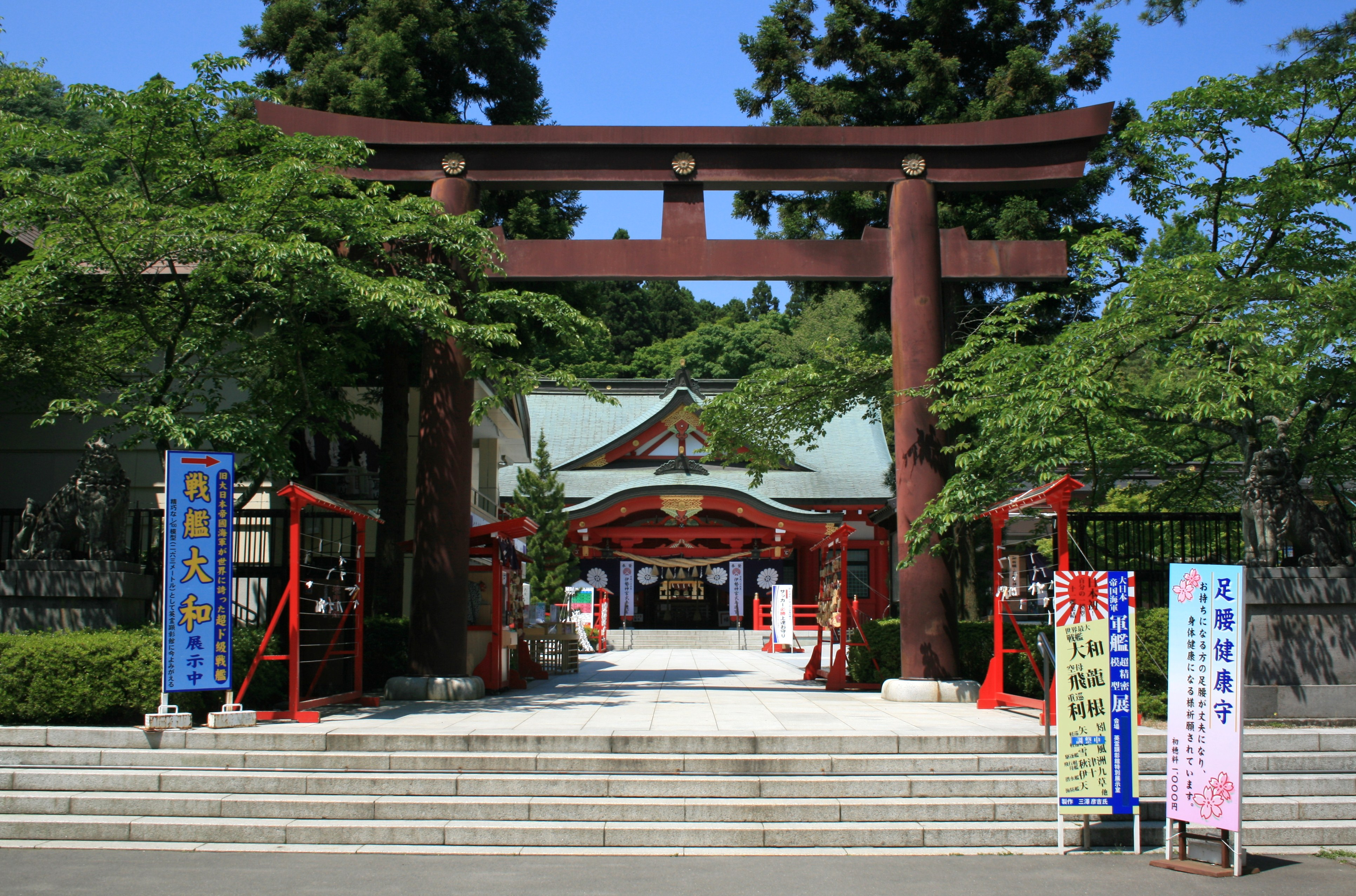
Torii with a main hall

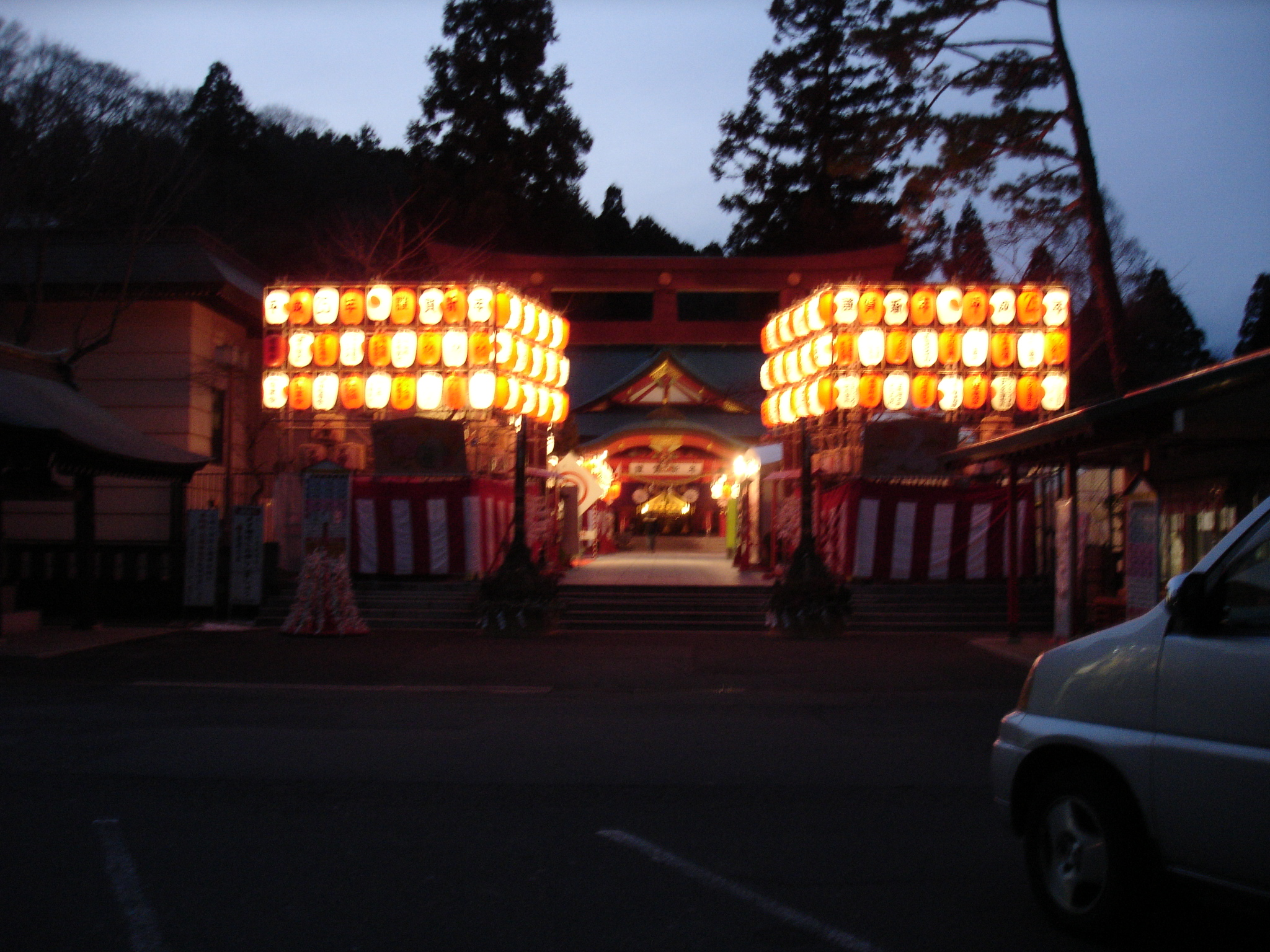
During the New Year season

== See also ==
- List of Shinto shrines in Japan
