= Hiroshima Gokoku Shrine =

Shinto shrine in Hiroshima, Japan

Hiroshima Gokoku Jinja (広島護国神社)
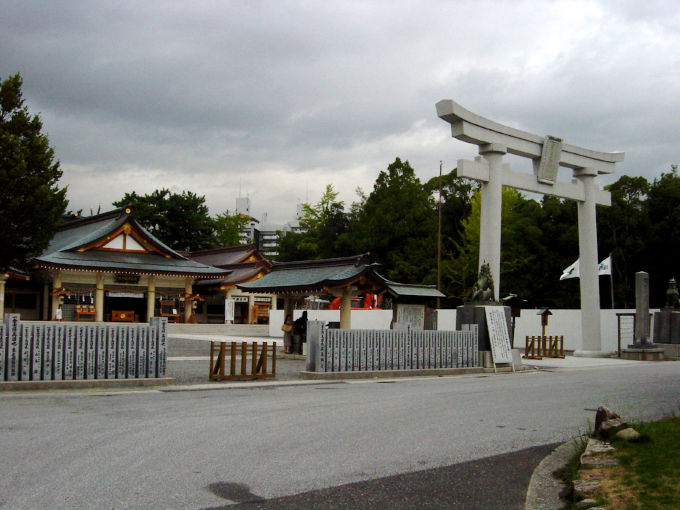
- Hiroshima Gokoku Shrine

- Location within Japan

Religion
- Affiliation: Shinto

Location
- Interactive map of Hiroshima Gokoku Jinja (広島護国神社)
- Coordinates: 34°24′4.2″N 132°27′31.5″E

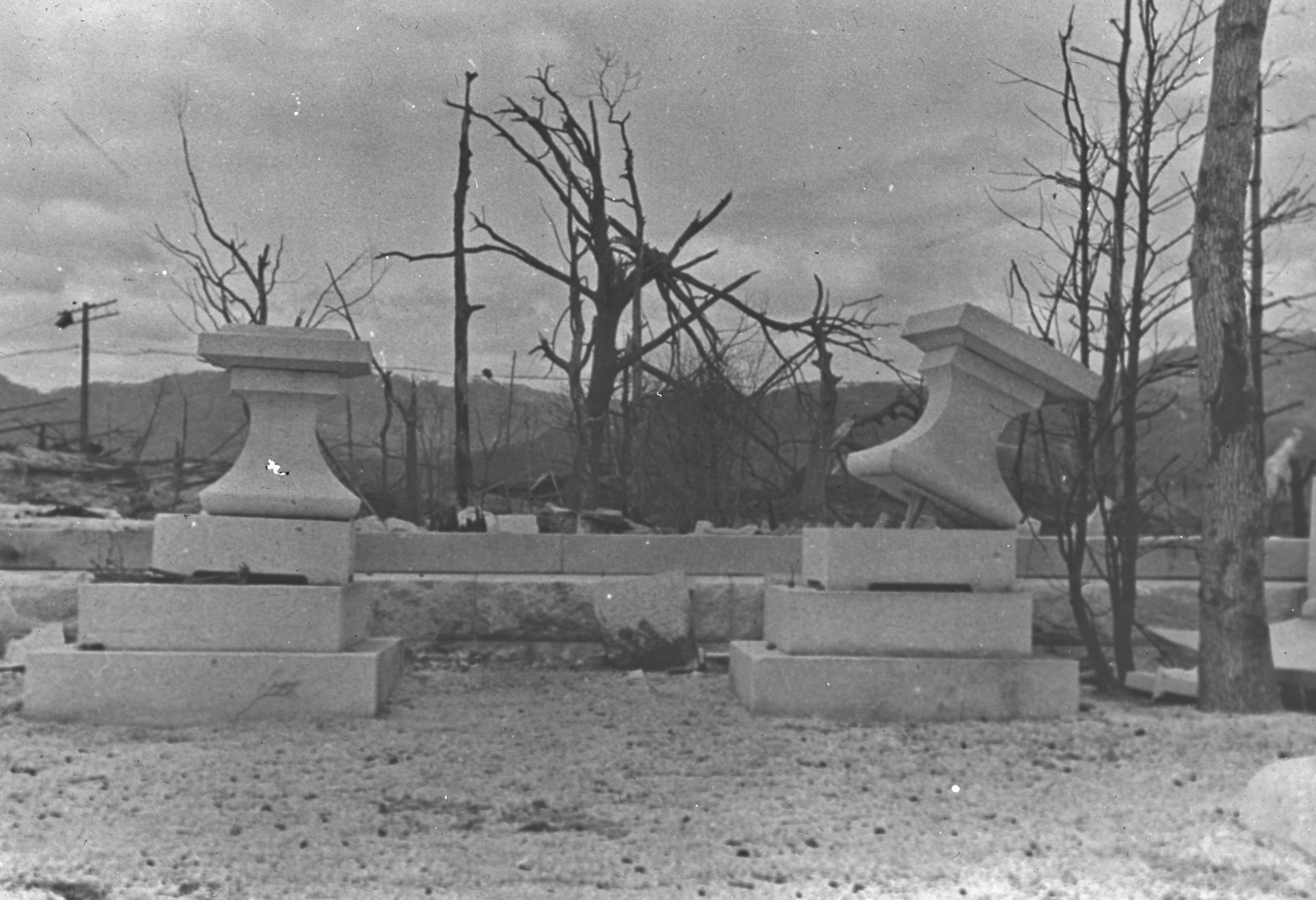
Hiroshima Gokoku Shrine after the bomb

Hiroshima Gokoku Jinja (広島護国神社) is a Japanese Shinto Shrine in Hiroshima, Japan.

== Overview ==
The original shrine was founded in 1869, the first year of the Meiji period, in Futabanosato (二葉の里) Hiroshima. The shrine was established to mourn the Hiroshima-Han victims of the Boshin War.

In 1934, it was dismantled and moved to where Hiroshima Municipal Stadium now stands, and in 1939 its name was changed to the Hiroshima Gokoku Shrine.

In 1945, it was destroyed by the atomic bombing, and was rebuilt within the confines of Hiroshima Castle in 1965 with the aid of donations from the citizens of Hiroshima.

The Hiroshima Gokoku Shrine is one of the most popular places for celebrating Hatsumōde and Shichi-Go-San in Hiroshima.

== See also ==
- Boshin War
- Atomic bombings of Hiroshima and Nagasaki
- Hiroshima Castle
- Hiroshima Tōshō-gū
- Japanese Shinto Shrine
- Hatsumōde
- Shichi-Go-San
- Hiroshima Toyo Carp
- Nagasaki Gokoku Shrine
