= The common end of myriad good deeds =

Buddhist concept

The common end of myriad good deeds (萬善同歸) is a Buddhist phrase and title of a work by Yongming Yanshou, a Zen master. He compiled 114 problems, cleverly integrating the doctrines of Buddhist Zen, Tiantai, Xianshou, and other sects into one whole, ultimately leading together to Pure land, so that the doctrines of all sects are cited. This is why we refer to the doctrines of all the religions, so that they are called "all goodness in one". This term has gradually become a terminology for praying for the blessings of the deceased souls, so there are Place of the common end of myriad good deeds , Wanshan Church, etc.
