= Eternal Spring Shrine =

Shrine in Xiulin, Hualien County, Taiwan

- 長春祠
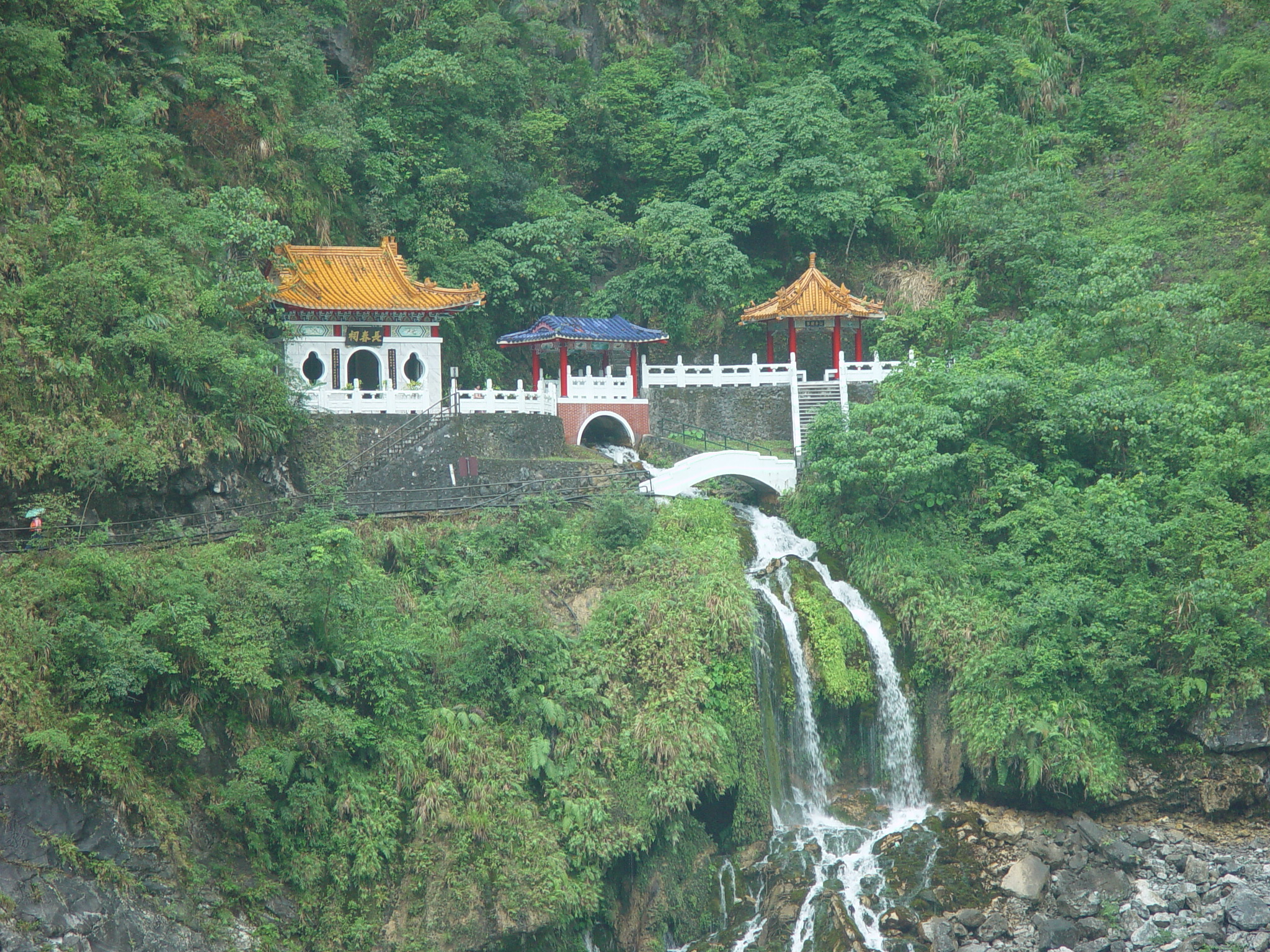

Location
- Location: Xiulin, Hualien County, Taiwan
- Interactive map of Eternal Spring Shrine
- Coordinates: 24°9′40.07″N 121°36′8.03″E

Architecture
- Established: 1958

Eternal Spring Shrine, also called Changchun Shrine (Chinese: 長春祠; pinyin: Chángchūn cí; Pe̍h-ōe-jī: Tiông-chhun-sû; lit. 'Ancestral shrine of Eternal', 'or Long', 'Spring'), is a landmark and a memorial shrine complex in Taroko National Park in Xiulin Township, Hualien County, Taiwan. It is one of the major picturesque points of the park, with the view of the mountains and the waterfall, and one of the main memorials for veterans.

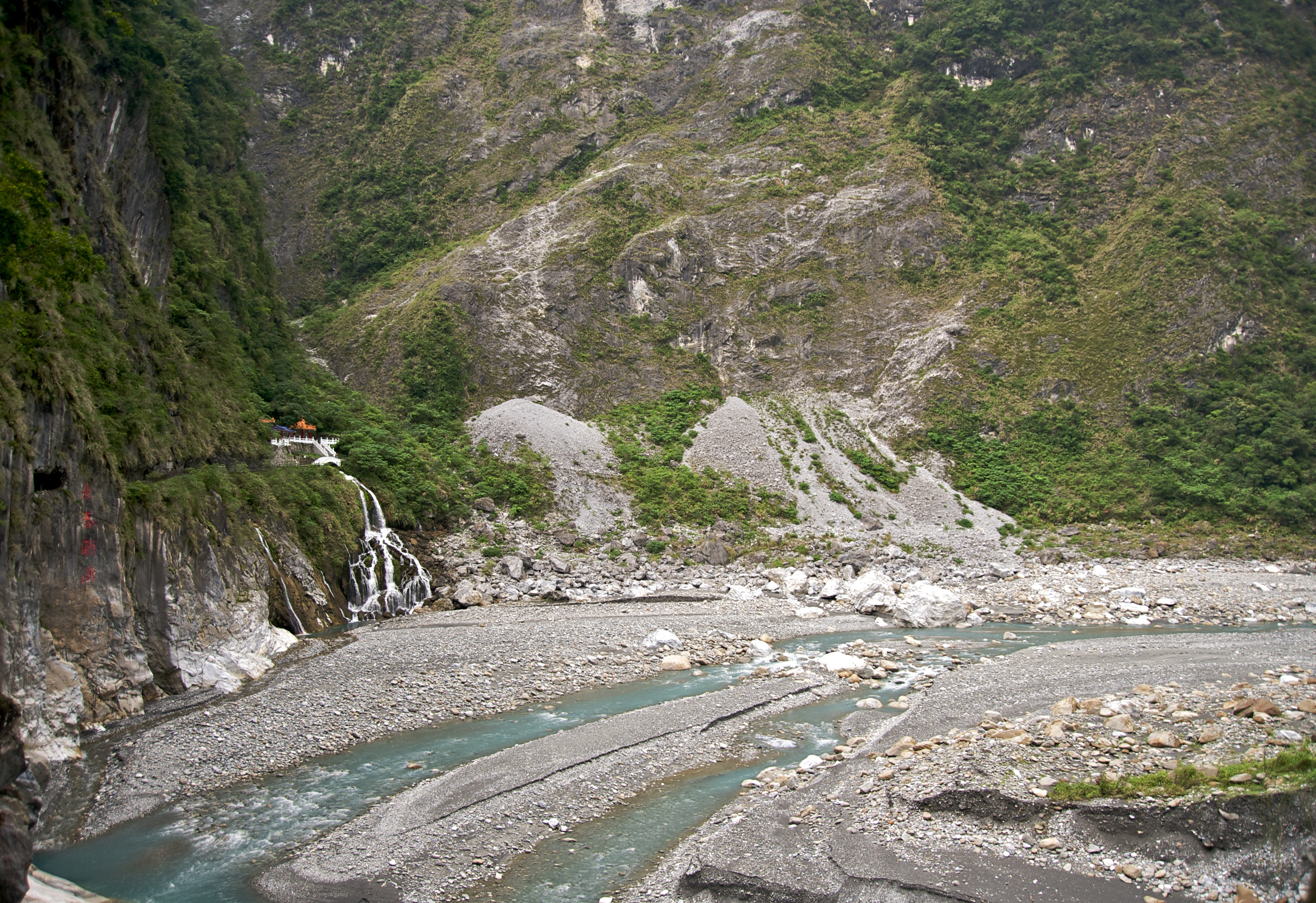
View of Eternal Spring Shrine from the Central Cross-Island Highway

It was planned for construction in 1958 while the Central Cross-Island Highway was built nearby. It commemorates the memory of 212 veterans who died while constructing the highway (1956—1960).

The name of the temple comes from the Changchun Falls that never stop running. The Shrine is located right above the waterfall streams.

It has been rebuilt at least twice, after being destroyed by landslides. The most recent shrine was built in 1989.

== See also ==
- List of tourist attractions in Taiwan
