= List of Shinto shrines in Taiwan =

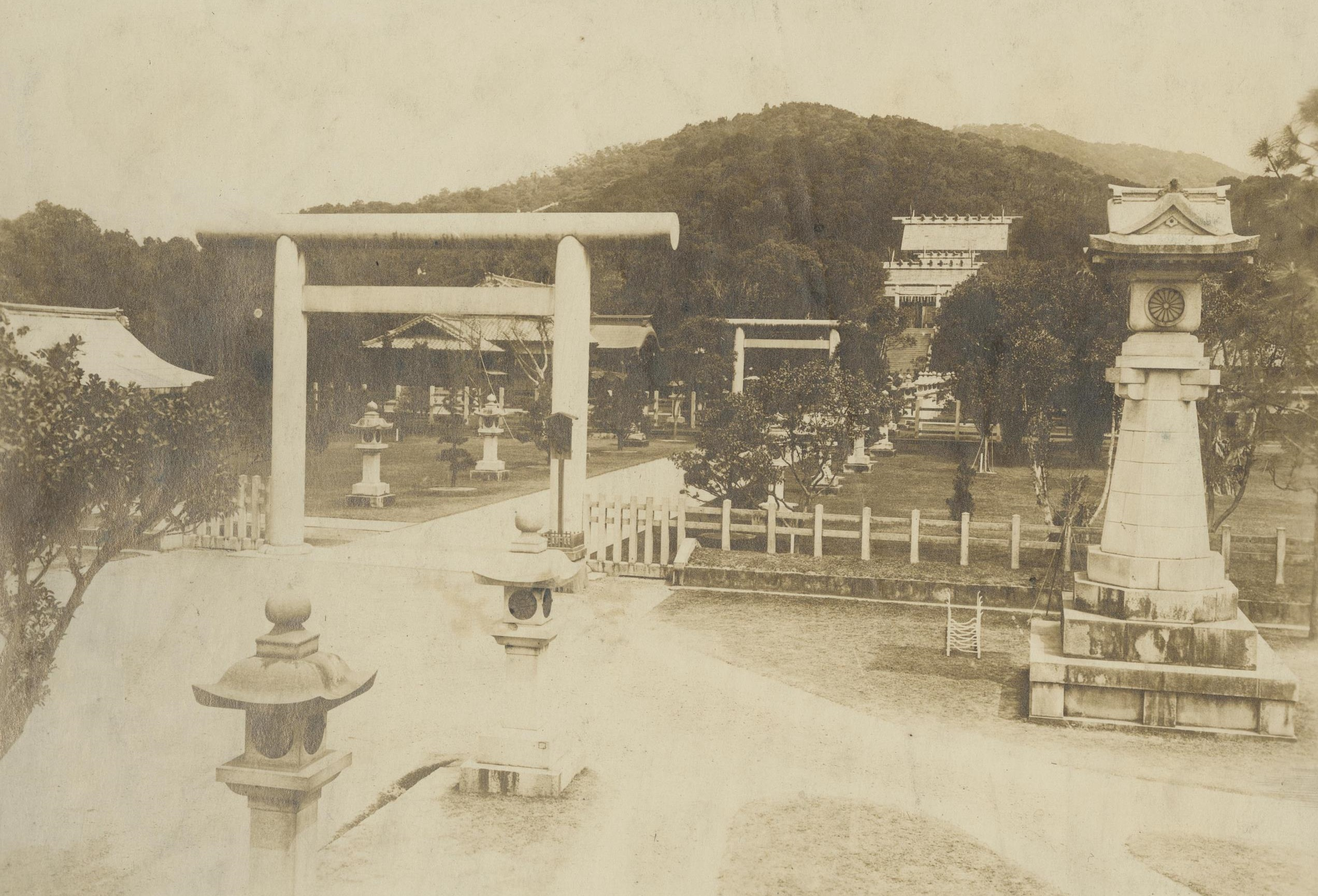
Taiwan Grand Shrine was the most notable Shinto shrine in Taiwan. It was destroyed by conflagration in 1944 when a cargo plane crashed in its vicinity. Today the Grand Hotel stands in its place.

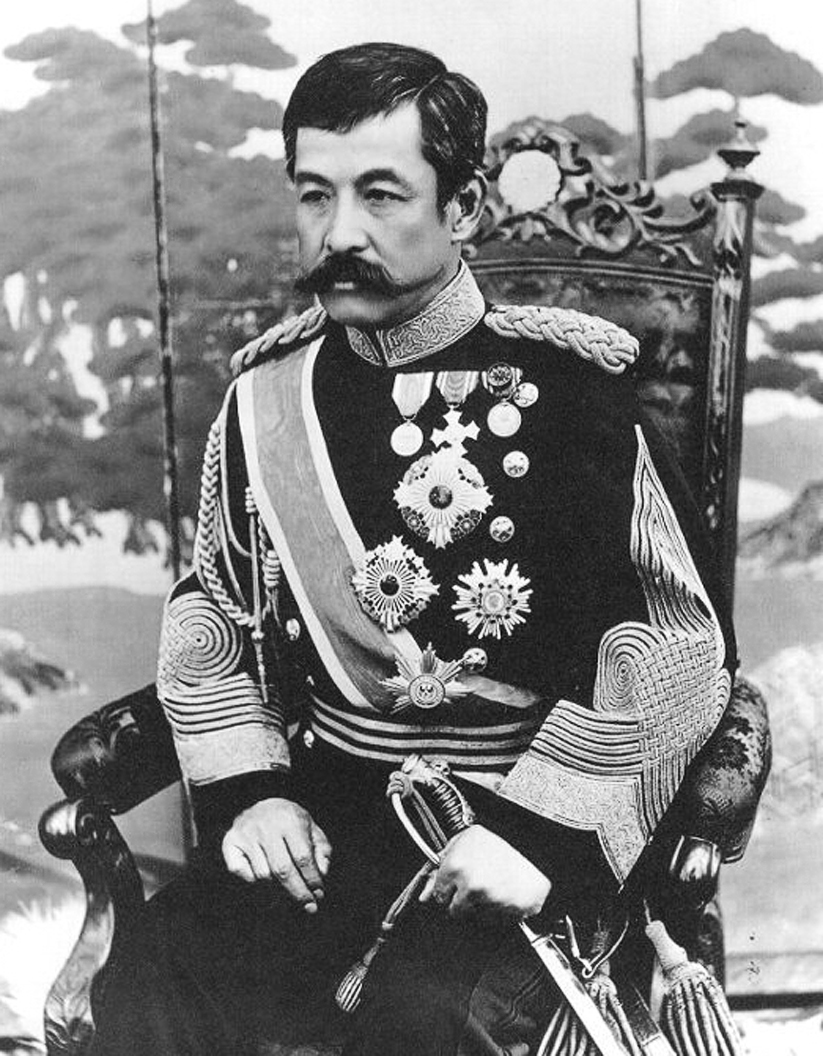
Prince Kitashirakawa Yoshihisa.

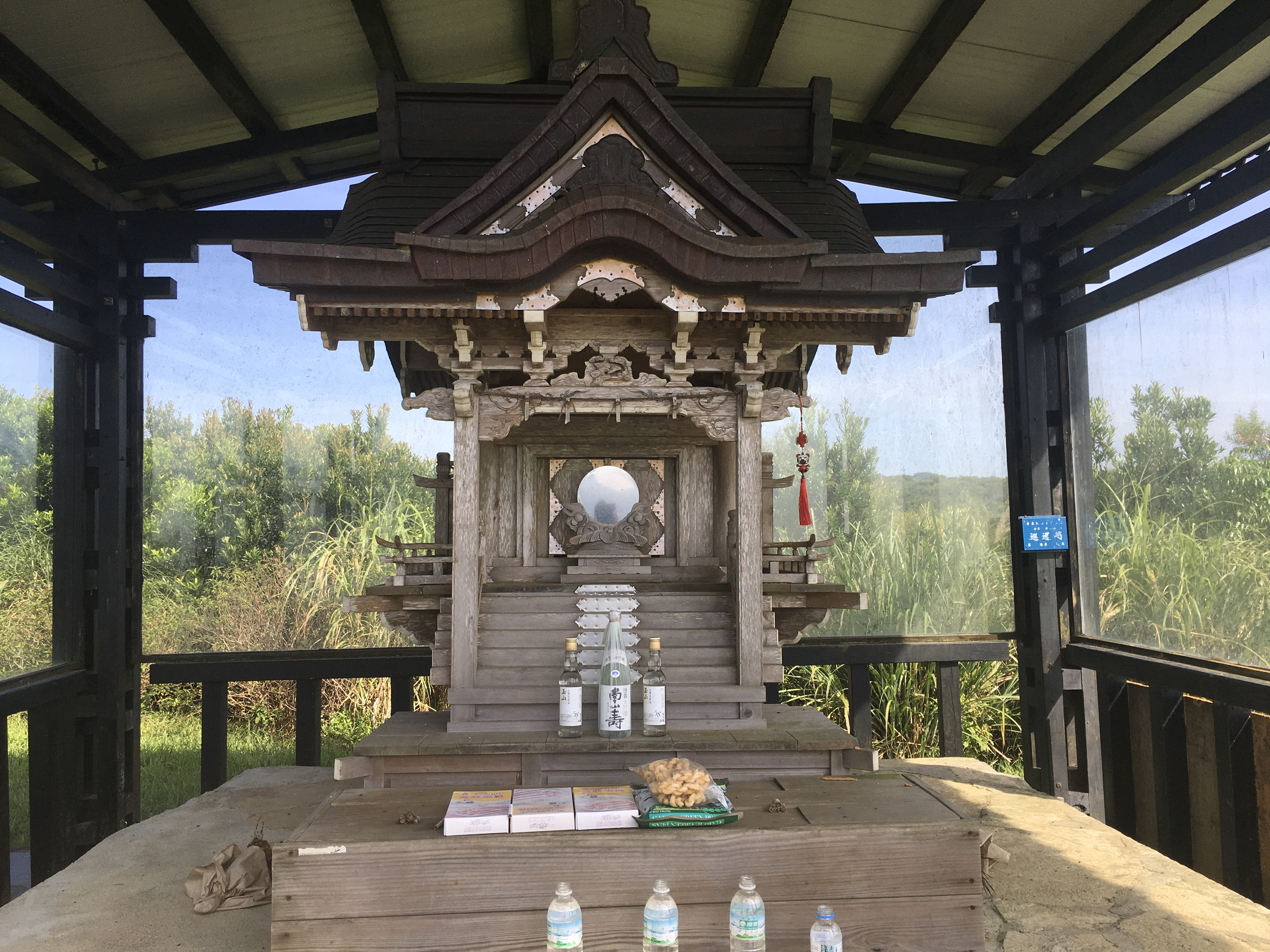
Gaoshi Shrine

On June 17, 1895 (Meiji 28), Taiwan came under the rule of the Empire of Japan. In the following year on December 3, 1896, the first Shinto shrine was created in Taiwan. This was actually an already existing Koxinga Shrine located in Tainan but renamed Kaizan Shrine (開山神社).

Since then, Shinto shrines were built in the major cities between the Meiji and Taishō period, while the majority of Shinto shrines in Taiwan were built from the late 1930s until Japan's defeat in World War II. In total, 204 shrines were built in Taiwan–66 of which were officially sanctioned by the Japanese Empire.

Although many shrines in the exterior territories (外地, gaichi) such as Hokkaidō had enshrined deities (祭神, Saijin) such as the Three Pioneer Kami (開拓三神, Kaitaku Sanjin) which consisted of Ōkunitama no Mikoto (大国魂命), Ōnamuchi no Mikoto (大己貴命) and Sukunahikona no Mikoto (少彦名命); the Sun Goddess Amaterasu; Meiji Emperor etc., in Taiwan, most shrines had Prince Yoshihisa as a Saijin. Prince Yoshihisa was sent to Taiwan to subjugate the anti-Japanese rebellion but fell ill and died from malaria in Tainan in 1895. This fate was so similar to that of the legendary Prince Yamato Takeru that Prince Yoshihisa was made a tutelary deity (鎮護の神, chingo no kami) of Taiwan. In 1901 (Meiji 34), the Taiwan Shrine (later Taiwan Grand Shrine) was built and Prince Yoshihisa along with the Three Pioneer Kami were enshrined. Amaterasu was later included in the shrine. The shrines in Taiwan followed in its lead and Prince Yoshihisa became a Saijin in most shrines throughout Taiwan. Furthermore, in Tainan, the place of Prince Yoshihisa's demise, the Tainan Shrine was built.

After Japan's defeat in World War II, the shrines were either abandoned, destroyed or converted into Chinese Martyr Shrines. In 2015, Gaoshi Shrine was reconstructed and became the first Shinto shrine built in Taiwan after World War II.

== List of shrines ==
Below is a list of Shinto shrines which were built during Japanese colonial rule. The shrines were ranked according to their importance such as Grand Shrine (官幣大社 kokuhei taisha), Small Shrine (国幣小社 Kokuhei Shōsha) and Martyr Shrine (護国神社 gokoku jinja), the last of which was designated by the Governor-General of Taiwan.

=== Taihoku Prefecture ===
| Shrine name | Location | Rank | Enshrined deity |
|---|---|---|---|
| Taiwan Grand Shrine | Taihoku | 官大 | Prince Yoshihisa, Three Pioneer Kami, Amaterasu |
| Kenkō Shrine (建功神社) | Taihoku | 県社 | 台湾での戦死者・殉職者等 |
| Taiwan Martyr Shrine (台湾護国神社) | Taihoku | 護国 | 台湾出身の護国の英霊 |
| Giran Shrine (宜蘭神社) | Giran district | 県社 | Prince Yoshihisa, Three Pioneer Kami, Amaterasu |
| Kiryū Shrine (基隆神社) | Kiryū | 県社 | Prince Yoshihisa, Three Pioneer Kami, Amaterasu, Ōmononushi no Mikoto, Emperor Sutoku |
| Taihoku Inari Shrine (台北稲荷神社) | Taihoku | 郷社 | Ukanomitama no Kami |
| Zuihō Shrine (瑞芳神社) | Kiron district | | Prince Yoshihisa, Three Pioneer Kami, Amaterasu |
| Ratō Shrine (羅東神社) | Ratō district | | Three Pioneer Kami, Emperor Meiji |
| Shiodome Shrine (汐止神社) | Shichisei district | | Prince Yoshihisa, Ōnamuchi no Mikoto, Amaterasu, Emperor Meiji, Ukanomitama no Mikoto |
| Shinshō Shrine (新荘神社) | Shinshō district | | Prince Yoshihisa, Emperor Meiji, Ukanomitama no Kami |
| Kaizan Shrine (海山神社) | Kaizan district | | Prince Yoshihisa, Ōnamuchi no Mikoto, Emperor Meiji |
| Tansui Shrine (淡水神社) | Tansui district | | Prince Yoshihisa, Emperor Meiji, Ōmononushi no Mikoto, Emperor Sutoku |
| Bunzan Shrine (文山神社) | Bunzan district | | Prince Yoshihisa, Three Pioneer Kami, Emperor Meiji |
| Suō Shrine (蘇澳神社) | Suō district | | Prince Yoshihisa, Emperor Meiji |
| Ōgon Shrine (黄金神社) | Kiryū district | | Ōkuninushi no Mikoto, Kanayamahiko no Mikoto, Sarutahiko no Mikoto |
| Maruyama Shrine (円山水神社) | Taihoku | | Prince Yoshihisa |

=== Shinchiku Prefecture ===
| Shrine name | Location | Rank | Enshrined deity |
|---|---|---|---|
| Shinchiku Shrine (新竹神社) | Shinchiku | 国小 | Prince Yoshihisa, Three Pioneer Kami |
| Tsūshō Shrine (通霄神社) | Byōritsu district | | Prince Yoshihisa, Amaterasu |
| Tōen Shrine (桃園神社) | Tōen district | 県社 | Prince Yoshihisa, Three Pioneer Kami, Toyōke no Ōmikami, Emperor Meiji |
| Byōritsu Shrine (苗栗神社) | Byōritsu district | | Prince Yoshihisa, Three Pioneer Kami, Emperor Meiji |
| Chūreki Shrine (中壢神社) | Chūreki district | | Prince Yoshihisa, Toyōke no Ōmikami |
| Tōfun Shrine (頭份神社) | Chikunan district | | Prince Yoshihisa, Toyōke no Ōmikami, Emperor Meiji |
| Chikunan Shrine (竹南神社) | Chikunan district | | Prince Yoshihisa, Ōkunimitama no Mikoto, Toyōke no Ōmikami |
| Taigo Shrine (大湖神社) | (大湖郡) | | Prince Yoshihisa, Ōkunimitama no Mikoto, Emperor Meiji |
| Chikutō Shrine (竹東神社) | Chikutō district | | Prince Yoshihisa, Three Pioneer Kami, Emperor Meiji |

=== Taichū Prefecture ===
| Shrine name | Location | Rank | Enshrined deity |
|---|---|---|---|
| Taichū Shrine (台中神社) | Taichū | 国小 | Prince Yoshihisa, Three Pioneer Kami |
| Shōka Shrine (彰化神社) | Shōka | 郷社 | Prince Yoshihisa, Three Pioneer Kami |
| Inrin Shrine (員林神社) | Inrin district | 郷社 | Prince Yoshihisa, Three Pioneer Kami |
| Kiyomizu Shrine (清水神社) | Taikō District | 郷社 | Prince Yoshihisa, Three Pioneer Kami, Amaterasu |
| Toyohara Shrine (豊原神社) | Toyohara district | | Prince Yoshihisa, Three Pioneer Kami, Amaterasu |
| Tōsei Shrine (東勢神社) | Tōsei district | | Prince Yoshihisa, Ōnamuchi no Mikoto, Emperor Meiji, Ōyamazumi no Kami, Ōwatatsumi no Kami |
| Takeyama Shrine (竹山神社) | Chikuzan district | | Prince Yoshihisa, Three Pioneer Kami, Emperor Meiji |
| Hokuto Shrine (北斗神社) | Hokuto district | | Prince Yoshihisa, Three Pioneer Kami, Emperor Meiji |
| Tanaka Shrine (田中神社) | Inrin district | | Prince Yoshihisa, Emperor Meiji |
| Rokō Shrine (鹿港神社) | Shōka district | | Prince Yoshihisa, Emperor Meiji, Kotoshironushi no Mikoto, Ōwatatsumi no Kami |
| Hidemizu Shrine (秀水神社) | Shōka district | | Prince Yoshihisa, Three Pioneer Kami, Emperor Meiji |
| Nōkō Shrine (能高神社) | Nōkō District | | Prince Yoshihisa, Three Pioneer Kami |
| Nantō Shrine (南投神社) | Nantō district | | Prince Yoshihisa, Three Pioneer Kami, Amaterasu |
| Gyochi Shrine (魚池神社) | Niitaka district | | Prince Yoshihisa, Three Pioneer Kami |

=== Tainan Prefecture ===
| Shrine name | Location | Rank | Enshrined deity |
|---|---|---|---|
| Tainan Shrine (台南神社) | Tainan | 官中 | Prince Yoshihisa |
| Kagi Shrine (嘉義神社) | Kagi | 国小 | Prince Yoshihisa, Three Pioneer Kami, Amaterasu |
| Kaizan Shrine (開山神社) | Tainan | 県社 | Tei Seikō (Koxinga) |
| Hokukō Shrine (北港神社) | Hokukō district (北港郡) | 郷社 | Prince Yoshihisa, Three Pioneer Kami, Amaterasu |
| Shinei Shrine (新営神社) | (新営郡) | 郷社 | Prince Yoshihisa, Three Pioneer Kami, Ukanomitama no Mikoto |
| Gokanseki Shrine (五間厝神社) | Kobi district | | Three Pioneer Kami, Amaterasu |
| Nansei Shrine (南靖神社) | Kagi district | | Ōnamuchi no Mikoto, Amaterasu |
| Arisan Shrine (阿里山神社) | Kagi district | | Prince Yoshihisa, Three Pioneer Kami, Ōyamazumi no Mikoto, Kagutsuchi no Mikoto, Mizuhanome no Kami, Shinatsuhiko no Mikoto |
| Hokumon Shrine (北門神社) | Hokumon district | | Prince Yoshihisa, Three Pioneer Kami, Amaterasu |
| Tōseki Shrine (東石神社) | Tōseki district | | Prince Yoshihisa, Three Pioneer Kami, Amaterasu |
| Sobun Shine (曽文神社) | Sobun District | | Prince Yoshihisa, Three Pioneer Kami |
| Shinka Shrine (新化神社) | Shinka district | | Prince Yoshihisa, Amaterasu, Toyōke no Ōmikami, Emperor Meiji |
| Toroku Shrine (斗六神社) | Toroku district | | Prince Yoshihisa, Three Pioneer Kami |
| Rinnai Shrine (林内神社) | Toroku district | | Prince Yoshihisa, Three Pioneer Kami, Toyōke no Ōmikami |

=== Takao Prefecture ===
| Shrine name | Location | Rank | Enshrined deity |
|---|---|---|---|
| Takao Shrine (高雄神社) | Takao | 県社 | Prince Yoshihisa, Ōmononushi no Mikoto, Emperor Sutoku |
| Akō Shrine (阿緱神社) | Heitō | 県社 | Prince Yoshihisa |
| Okayama Shrine (岡山神社) | Kōzan district | 郷社 | Prince Yoshihisa, Three Pioneer Kami, Amaterasu, Emperor Meiji |
| Chōshū Shrine (潮州神社) | Chōshū district | 郷社 | Prince Yoshihisa, Amaterasu, Toyōke no Ōmikami, Ōkuninushi no Kami |
| Tōkō Shrine (東港神社) | Tōkō district | 郷社 | Prince Yoshihisa, Three Pioneer Kami, Amaterasu |
| Hōzan Shrine (鳳山神社) | Hōzan district | 郷社 | Prince Yoshihisa, Three Pioneer Kami |
| Rikō Shrine (里港神社) | Heitō district | | Prince Yoshihisa, Amaterasu, Mizuhanome no Kami |
| Katō Shrine (佳冬神社) | Tōkō district | | Prince Yoshihisa, Three Pioneer Kami, Amaterasu |
| Kizan Shrine (旗山神社) | Kizan district | | Prince Yoshihisa, Three Pioneer Kami, Emperor Antoku |
| Kōshun Shrine (恒春神社) | Kōshun district | | Prince Yoshihisa, Three Pioneer Kami |

=== Hōko Prefecture ===
| Shrine name | Location | Rank | Enshrined deity |
|---|---|---|---|
| Hōko Shrine (澎湖神社) | Makō subprefecture (馬公支庁) | 県社 | Prince Yoshihisa, Three Pioneer Kami |

=== Taitō Prefecture ===
| Shrine name | Location | Type | Enshrined deity |
|---|---|---|---|
| Taitō Shrine (台東神社) | Taitō district | 県社 | Prince Yoshihisa, Three Pioneer Kami |
| Rirō Shrine (里壟社) | | | |
| Hinan Shrine (卑南祠) | | | |
| Shikano Shrine (鹿野神社) | Shikano district | 無格社 | Prince Yoshihisa, Three Pioneer Kami |
| Kasowan Shrine (加走湾祠) | | | |

=== Karenkō Prefecture ===
| Shrine name | Location | Rank | Enshrined deity |
|---|---|---|---|
| Karenkō Shrine | Karen district | 県社 | Prince Yoshihisa, Three Pioneer Kami |
| Yoshino Shrine (吉野神社) | Karen district | | Prince Yoshihisa, Three Pioneer Kami |
| Toyota Shrine (豊田神社) | Karen district | | Prince Yoshihisa, Three Pioneer Kami |
| Hayashida Shrine (林田神社) | Karen district | | Prince Yoshihisa, Three Pioneer Kami |
| Sakuma Shrine (佐久間神社) | Karen district | | Ōnamuchi no Mikoto, Samata Sakuma |
| Kotobuki Shrine (寿社) | | | |

== Enshrined deities ==
| Japanese | Rōmaji | English |
|---|---|---|
| 鄭成功 | Tei Seikō | Koxinga |
| 能久親王 | Yoshihisa Shinnō | Prince Kitashirakawa Yoshihisa |
| 開拓三神 | Kaitaku Sanjin | Three Pioneer Kami |
| 天照大神 | Amaterasu Ōmikami | Amaterasu |
| 豊受大神 | Toyouke no Ōmikami | Toyouke-hime |
| 佐久間 左馬太 | SAKUMA, Samata | Sakuma Samata |
| 明治天皇 | Meiji Tennō | Emperor Meiji |
| 崇徳天皇 | Sutoku Tennō | Emperor Sutoku |
| 安徳天皇 | Antoku Tennō | Emperor Antoku |

- 大国主神/大国主命/大己貴命 Ōkuninushi no Kami/Mikoto, Ōnamuchi no Mikoto
- 大物主命 Ōmononushi no Mikoto
- 倉稲魂神/倉稲魂命 Ukanomitama no Kami/Mikoto
- 弥都波能売神 Mizuhanome no Kami
- 金山彦命 Kanayamahiko no Mikoto
- 猿田彦命 Sarutahiko no Mikoto
- 大国魂命 Ōkunimitama no Mikoto
- 大綿津見神 Ōwatatsumi no Kami
- 事代主命 Kotoshironushi no Mikoto
- 大山祇神/大山祇命 Ōyamazumi no Kami/Mikoto
- 火具津智命 Kagutsuchi no Mikoto
- 科津彦命 Shinatsuhiko no Mikoto

== See also ==
- Shinto
- Shinto shrine
- Shinto in Taiwan
- Sugiura Shigemine
- Taiwan under Japanese rule
- Political divisions of Taiwan (1895-1945)
- Governor-General of Taiwan
- Formosan Army
