= Shinto in Taiwan =

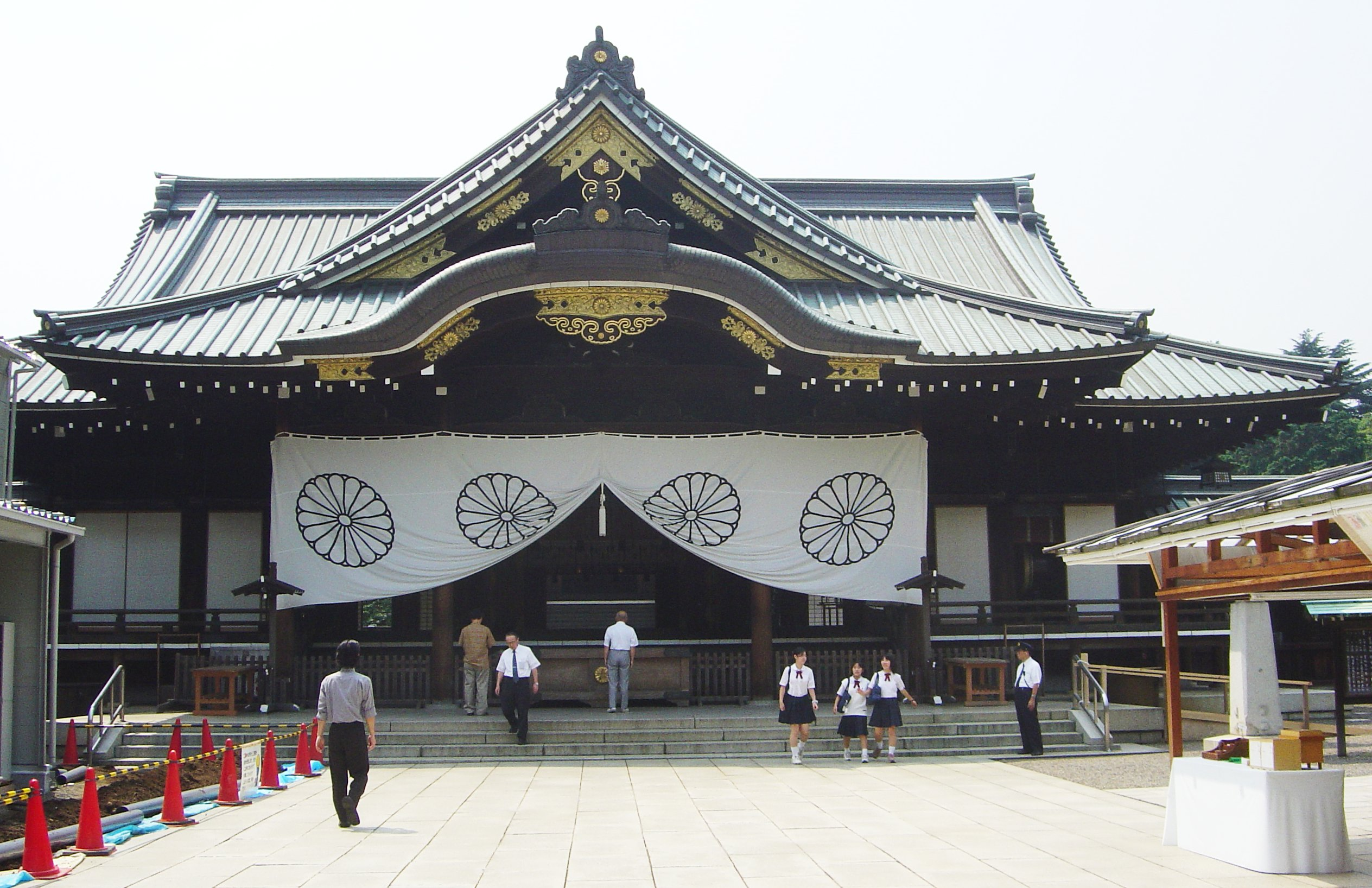
The Book of Souls in the Yasukuni Shrine lists the names of 27,863 Taiwanese who fought for the Emperor of Japan between 1937 and 1945

Shinto in Taiwan has its origins in the beginning of the 50-year Japanese colonial rule of Taiwan in 1895 when the Empire of Japan brought their state religion, Shinto, to the island. The Taiwanese were encouraged to adopt the religion in 1937 as the Empire of Japan began to intensify its imperialist policy in China and used Taiwan as its base into southeast Asia. Of the Taiwanese who lost their lives fighting for the Japanese Emperor until the Empire's defeat in 1945, a total of 27,863 are recorded in the Book of Souls and enshrined as eirei (英霊; spirits of fallen soldiers) in Yasukuni Shrine in Tokyo, Japan.

== Japanese colonial rule ==
Between 1919 and 1936, the colonial government in Taiwan began compulsory education of Taiwanese and emphasized cultural assimilation. In 1937, the Japanese Empire in Taiwan began the Kōminka Movement (皇民化運動, kōminka undō), a policy of converting and fully integrating the Taiwanese as Japanese citizens. This was to be achieved by denying the Taiwanese of their Chinese heritage through the adoption of Japanese names and through use of the Japanese language as their national language (國語, kokugo); adopting Japanese aspects of life such as Japanese clothing, Japanese cuisine, and Shinto. The use of Chinese dialects and practice of Chinese customs were discouraged and Chinese-language schools were closed. The Japanese sought to convert the aborigines by promoting the story of Sayon as a patriotic Taiwanese.

=== Shinto shrines ===
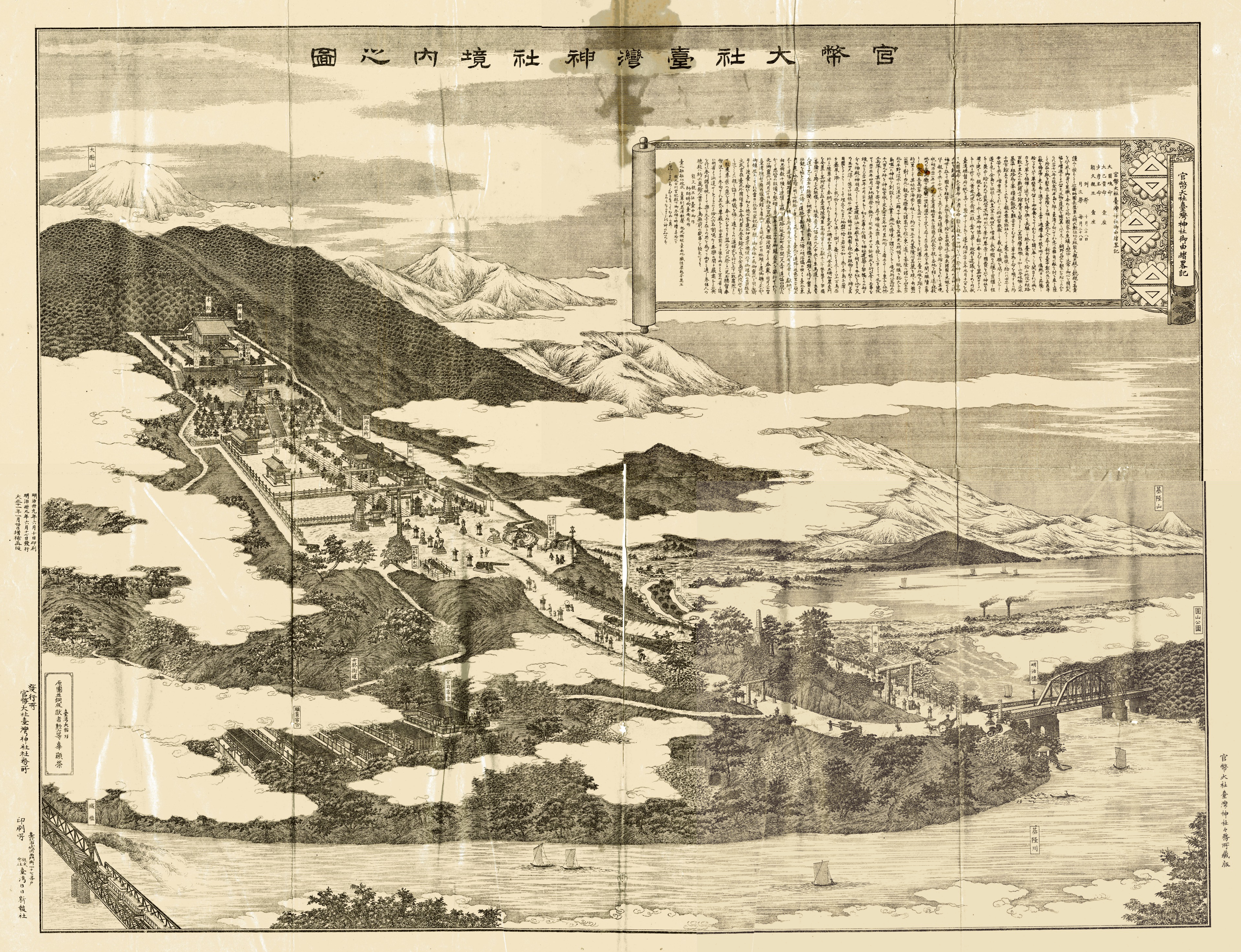
Taiwan Grand Shrine, the most notable of all Shinto shrines in Taiwan and the first to enshrine Prince Kitashirakawa Yoshihisa

The first Shinto shrine to be established in Taiwan was the Kaizan Shrine in Tainan Prefecture in 1897 but the most notable was the Taiwan Shrine in Taihoku Prefecture (now Taipei) which was built in 1901 to honor Prince Kitashirakawa Yoshihisa who died from illness whilst on a mission in Tainan to subjugate the Taiwanese rebellion. In 1923, Crown Prince Hirohito (later Shōwa Emperor) visited Taiwan on a tour to celebrate his inauguration as regent. In total, 204 Shinto shrines were built throughout Taiwan, but only 66 were officially sanctioned by the state. After World War II, many of the Shinto shrines were torn down by the Kuomintang from mainland China, while others were replaced by martyr's shrines.

== Current ==
In modern times, two Shinto shrines were rebuilt: Gaoshi Shrine and Luye Shrine. Only Gaoshi Shrine is still active, while Luye Shrine is not used to venerate any kami. Today, some Shinto-based Japanese new religions have a presence in Taiwan.

== See also ==
- List of Shinto shrines in Taiwan
- Taiwan under Japanese rule
- Political divisions of Taiwan (1895-1945)
- Governor-General of Taiwan
- Formosan Army
- Tenrikyo
