= Saqacengalj =

Archaeological site and former indigenous settlement of Paiwan people

Saqacengalj (Chinese: Saqacengalj舊社遺址; pinyin: Saqacengalj jiùshèyí zhǐ) is an abandoned or so-called former indigenous settlement of a Paiwan tribe in Gaoshi Village, Mudan Township, Pingtung County, Taiwan. The term "Saqacengalj" meanings of "a tool for chiseling slate", and the site is believed to be the first settlement of the Paiwan people when they moved to Hengchun. Saqacengal, dating back to 500–600 years ago, is about 200–300 meters above sea level, and covers an area of 3.5 hectares. There were 6-7 waves of migration before the site was abandoned, and the Paiwan people finally settled down at the location of Gaoshi Village for the last migration around 50 years ago. The location of Saqacengalj is about 7 kilometers away from the current settlement of Gaoshi Village. There are still about 83 slate house structures at Saqacengalj, which are arranged in parallel rows along the mountain steps

== Surrounding environment ==
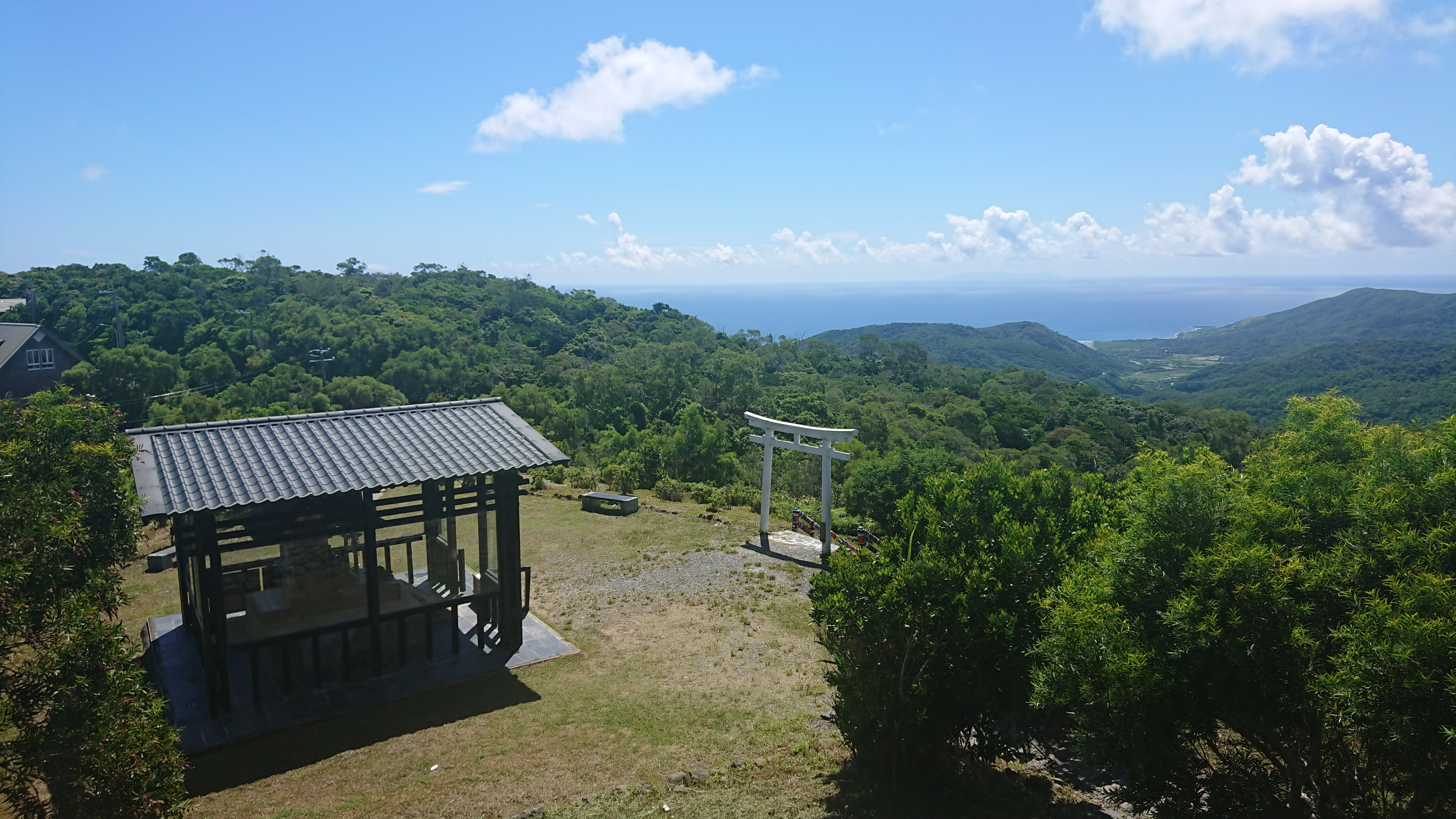
Gaoshi Shrine

Saqacengalj is located on the gentle slope of the forest compartment, surrounded by mountains and is in an environment of a low-altitude broad-leaved forest. The west side of the site is backed by the hillside and the east side faces the Pacific Ocean. The campus of the National Chung Shan Institute of Science and Technology (NCSIST) is located below the site, with Gangzai Creek flowing through it. It is adjacent to Gaoshi Village, Mudan Township, Pingtung County. There is a guide and instruction board for the Saqacengalj site at the entrance.

The Gaoshi Village nearby is a Paiwan settlement, which facilitates the development of cultural tourism and eco-tourism. The tourist attractions in the community are characterized by Gaoshi Shrine and historical trails. Every October is the best bird-watching time for the Gray-faced Buzzard (Butastur indicus) along the Gaoshi historical trail (Pinayuanan: si i padai padai djalan)

== Research and finding ==
Saqacengalj has been systematically researched by Chen Maaling, a professor of the Department of Anthropology at National Taiwan University, since 2002. The initial work was the restoration of the site, focusing on mapping the entire layout of the settlement and its internal structures and spaces. After cleaning up the site, relevant artifacts were also found,. such as sandstone slates and glazed ceramics. In addition to archaeological excavations, investigations of oral history, digital scanning modeling, and GIS analysis were also conducted to make the research more complete. According to the research and excavation results, unearthed artifacts include stone tools such as adzes and chisels, axes and hoes, grind stones, and stone core tools; large stone artifacts such as stone mortars, human-shaped stone statues and stone pillars; metal artifacts such as bronze spoons, needles, bells and rings, iron spearheads, arrowheads, knives, and metal slag; ceramic such as pottery beads; and porcelain and stonewares as well. Among them, the glazed pottery was identified to be produced in Fujian, and imported to Taiwan, indicating that the residents of Saqacengalj may have interacted with the Han people.

== Spatial organization ==
Through the results of GIS analysis and spatial analysis, the settlement presents systematic planning and organization, and shows hierarchical divisions. Two houses were arranged side by side with a wall in between, backed by a piled stone wall against the hillside. Most of the house has a stone platform in front of it. Among them, a house, with a larger stone platform accompanied by a 3 meters stone pillar, is generally believed to be the house of the chieftain. Most of the ethnographic references and research focus mainly on the northern-style houses of the northern Paiwan. There are relatively few studies on the slate houses of southern Paiwan, and most of them have been recorded since the Japanese colonial period. The research of Saqacengalj shows the characteristic of slate houses of the southern Paiwan.
