= Tainan Canal =

Canal in Tainan, Taiwan

Coordinates: 22°58′44″N 120°10′32″E

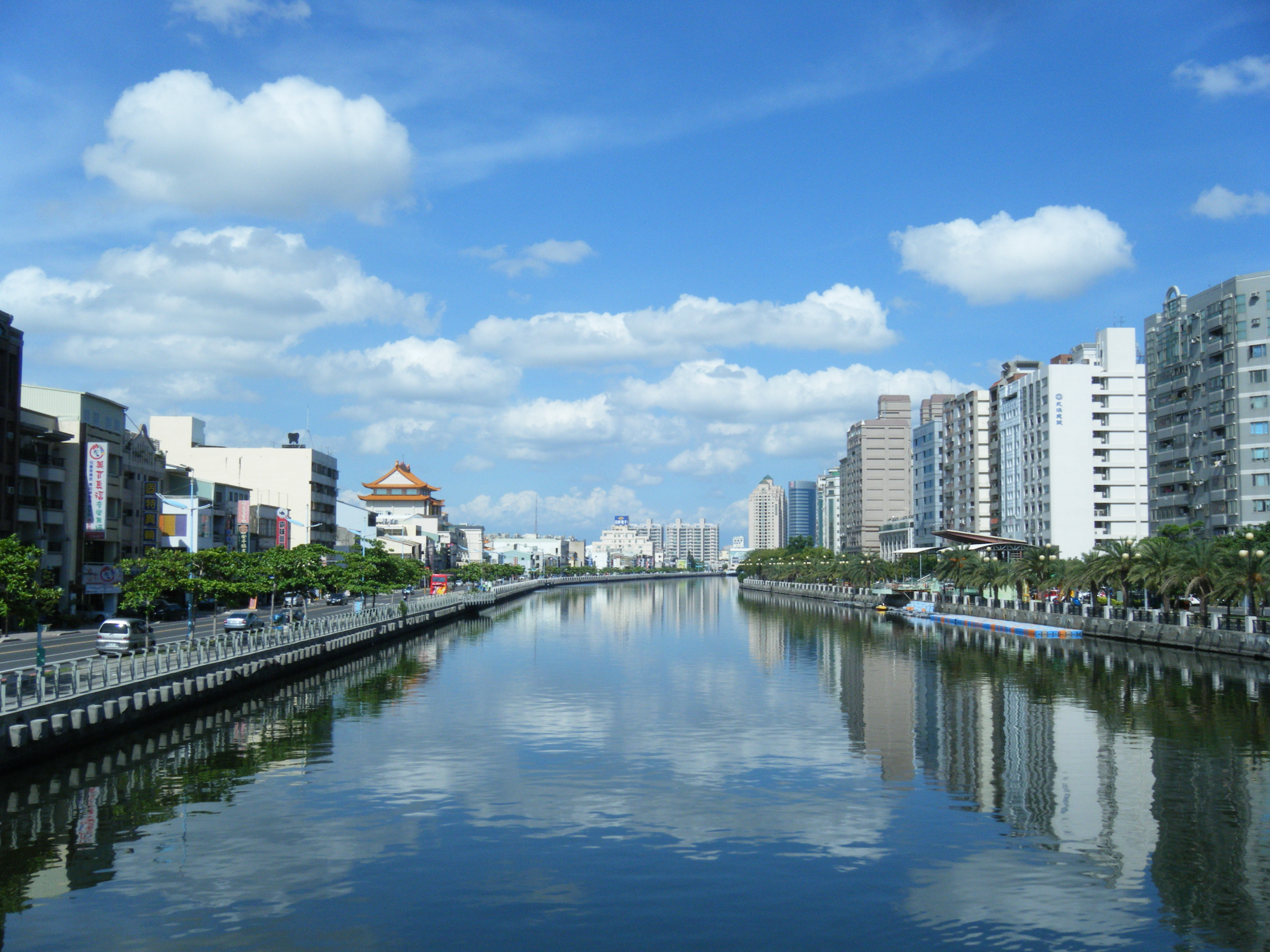
Tainan Canal

The Tainan Canal Chinese: 臺南運河; pinyin: Táinán yùnhé is a man-made waterway in Tainan, Taiwan, connecting the city's urban area with Port of Anping and the Taiwan Strait. The current canal was constructed during the Japanese colonial period (1895–1945) to replace an earlier canal that had become silted. Once vital for trade and transportation, the canal has since transitioned into a tourism and recreational area, hosting dragon boat races and sightseeing boat tours.

== History ==
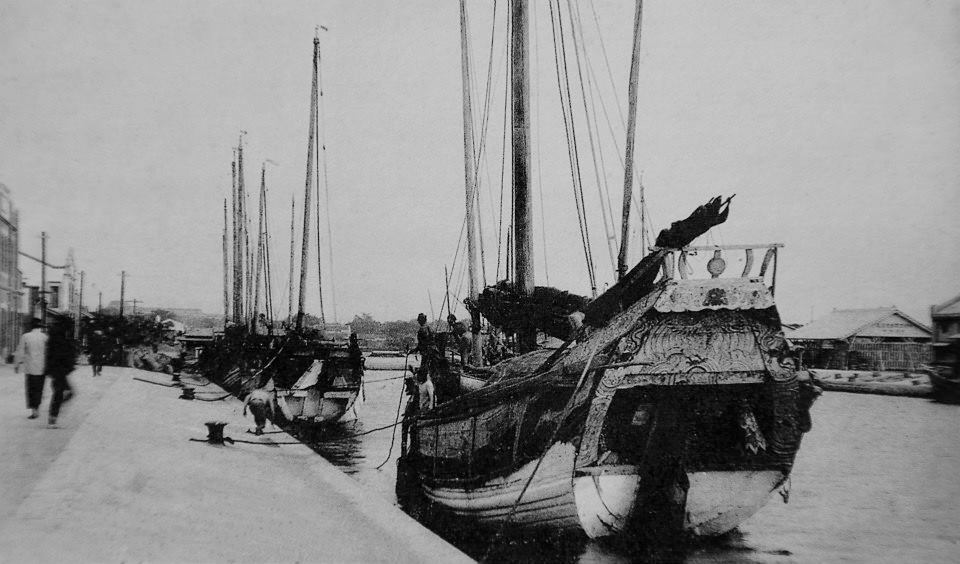
Tainan Canal during the Japanese colonial period

=== The Old Canal (1823–1903) ===
The earliest version of the Tainan Canal was built during the Qing Dynasty in 1823. The canal was constructed to serve as a major trade route, allowing goods to be transported between Anping Harbor and Tainan’s city center. However, frequent flooding, silt buildup, and the natural redirection of the Zengwen River gradually rendered the canal unusable. By the early 20th century, the canal was no longer navigable, prompting plans for a new waterway. Today, remnants of the old canal have been transformed into a green corridor, providing a recreational space for residents.

=== The Modern Canal (1922–1926) ===
To restore the city's waterway access, the Japanese colonial government initiated the construction of a new canal. Work began on April 16, 1922, and was completed on March 1926 under the supervision of Matatarō Matsumoto, a Japanese engineer. The canal was 3.78 km (2.35 mi) long, 37 m (121 ft) wide, and 1.8 m (5 ft 11 in) deep at low tide. The project allowed vessels to navigate directly to the city, boosting commerce and urban development. The canal was formally opened on 15 April 1926, with a procession featuring statues of the Seven Lucky Gods and Koxinga, the latter lent by the Kaishan Shrine. That afternoon, the Grand Matsu Temple's Zhennan Matsu traversed the waterway, leading to a local saying, "Matsu opens the canal."

Over time, the role of the canal declined due to the silting of Anping Harbor, increased competition from Kaohsiung Port, and the construction of bridges that obstructed ship passage. By the 1970s, commercial use of the canal had largely ceased.

== Urban Development: Tainan Canal Star Diamond Project ==
In recent years, the Tainan City Government has initiated the Tainan Canal Star Diamond Project Chinese: 運河星鑽, an urban renewal plan targeting the former shipbuilding yard and school sites in the area. The project involves relocating Tainan Municipal Jincheng Junior High School and Xinnan Elementary School to facilitate redevelopment. As part of the plan, two additional bridges, New Lin’an Bridge and Jinhua Bridge, were constructed. The project is expected to generate NT$4 billion (US$130 million) in economic benefits.

== Tourism and Recreation ==
=== Canal Boat Tours ===
A private company operates sightseeing boat tours along the canal, offering three routes:

- Golden Waterway Route – A journey through six bridges, showcasing the city’s canal scenery.
- Anping Harbor Route – A weekend-only tour covering sites such as Anping Lighthouse, Eternal Golden Castle, the decommissioned warship TDD-925 (USS Sarsfield), and Yuguang Island.
- Full Canal & Harbor Route – A combination of the first two routes.

=== Dragon Boat Festival ===
The canal hosts annual dragon boat races between Anyi Bridge and Chengtian Bridge, drawing large crowds every Dragon Boat Festival.
