= Taiwan Grand Shrine =

Former Shinto shrine in Taipei, Taiwan

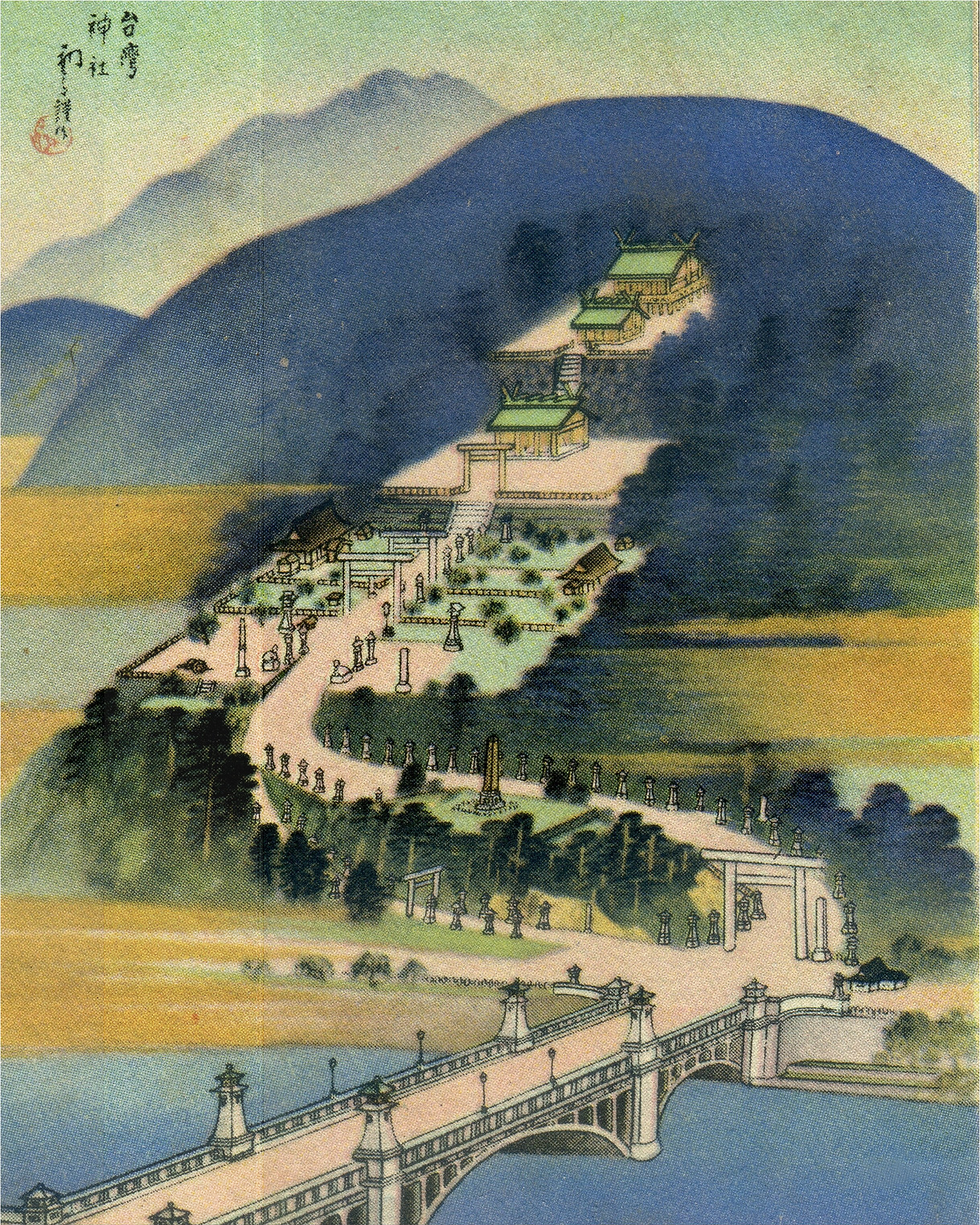
A painting of Taiwan Grand Shrine during Japanese colonial rule. At the bottom of the painting is the Keelung River and in the lower-right corner the Meiji Bridge is partially visible.

The Taiwan Grand Shrine (Chinese: 臺灣神宮; pinyin: Táiwān Shéngōng; Japanese pronunciation: Taiwan Jingū) was the highest ranking Shinto shrine in Taiwan under Japanese rule. It was located in Taihoku, Taiwan (now Zhongshan District, Taipei). Among the officially sanctioned Shinto shrines in Taiwan, Taiwan Grand Shrine held the highest rank of them all. The Grand Hotel stands at the shrine's former site.

== History ==
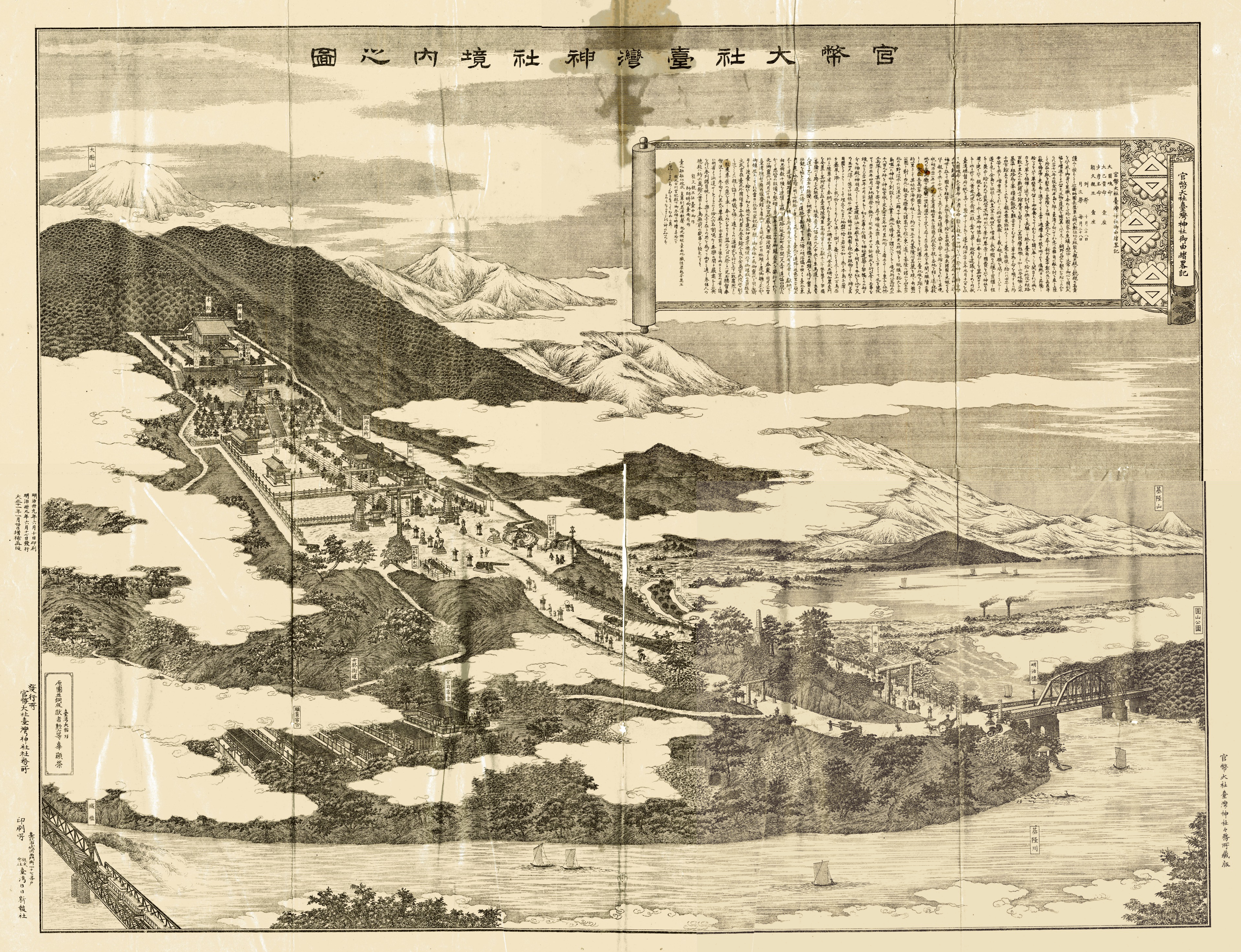
Taiwan Grand Shrine Map (1920s) records the location of each object and detailed information.

Following the death of Prince Yoshihisa in 1895, the Governor-General of Taiwan Nogi Maresuke began planning for a shrine in Yoshihisa's honor. Originally, the plan was to construct the shrine at Yuanshan Park (圓山公園, now part of Taipei Expo Park); however, Nogi's successor Kodama Gentarō and chief planner Gotō Shinpei decided to move it across the Keelung River to Jiantan Mountain (劍潭山) for the site's higher elevation. The vantage point would allow the shrine to overlook the entire city, making it symbolic for the Japanese Empire's colonial power. The construction lasted between 1900 and 1901, and the completed shrine was dedicated to Yoshihisa and the Kaitaku Sanjin (開拓三神, Three Kami Deities of Pioneering). In 1915, a railway station named Miyanoshita Station (宮ノ下乘降場; now Jiantan metro station) was placed at the foot of Jiantan Mountain to serve the shrine. On April 12, 1923, Crown Prince Hirohito, who would become Emperor Shōwa three years later, embarked on a two-week tour of Taiwan. In preparation for his visit to the shrine, Chokushi Road (勅使街道, Chokushi kaidō; present-day Chungshan North Road) was created leading up to the shrine from the city, with the Meiji Bridge (明治橋) crossing the Keelung River.

The shrine was elevated in rank to Grand Shrine (jingū) in 1944 (Shōwa 19) when Amaterasu was enshrined, making it the highest-ranking shrine in Taiwan. The opening ceremony of the new shrine was planned to be on October 28. However, on October 23, 1944, a cargo plane lost control and crashed atop the mountain where the Taiwan Grand Shrine was located, heavily damaging roughly half of the shrine. The shrine was never fully repaired due to Japan's surrender after World War II, and much of the shrine's materials were taken for construction projects elsewhere. In its place, the Grand Hotel was constructed in 1952, where it remains as a prominent landmark of the city.

== Gallery ==
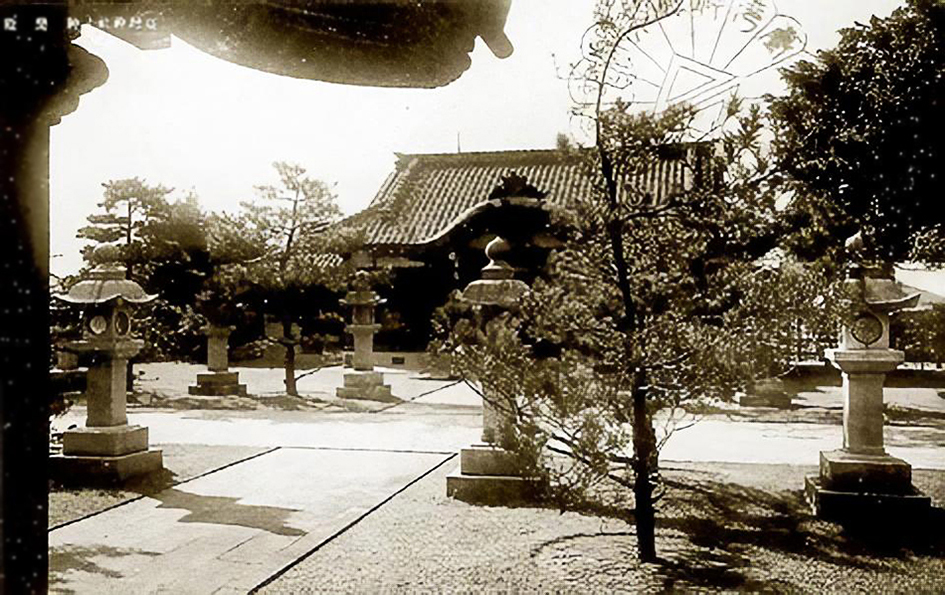
A postcard issued by the Governor-General of Taiwan of Taiwan Grand Shrine. The Imperial Seal is visible in the upper-right section.

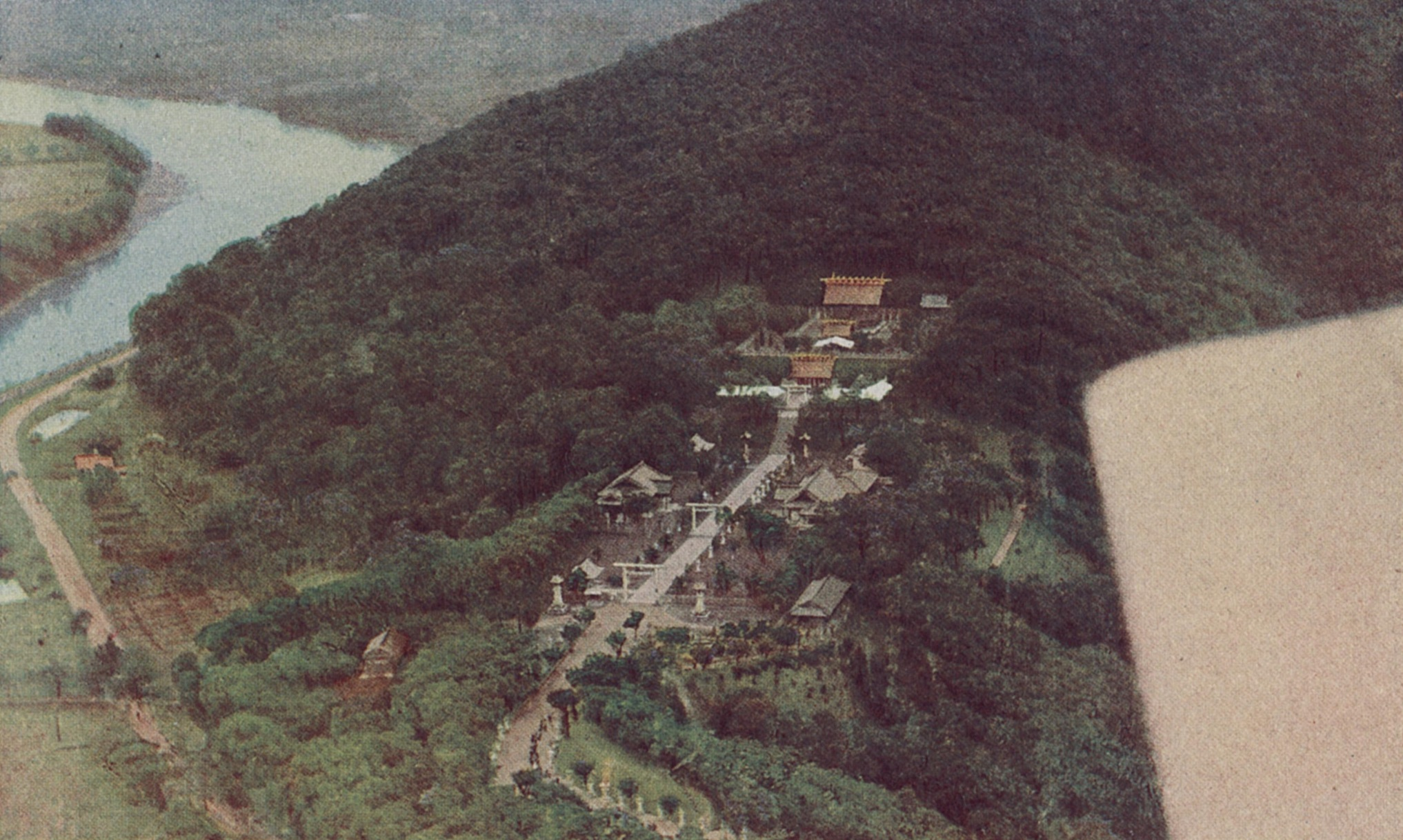
Aerial view of Taiwan Grand Shrine (Early Shōwa Period)

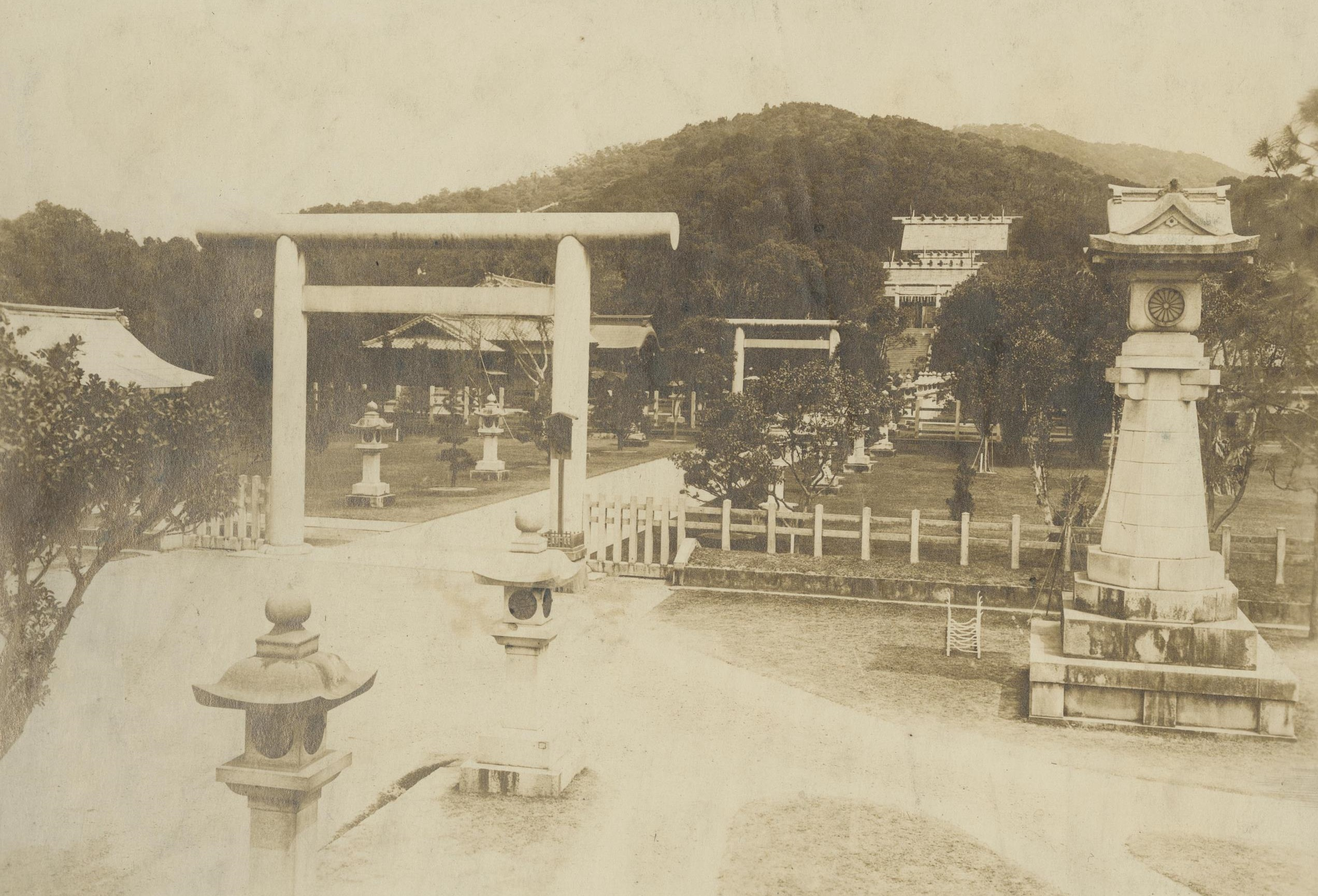
Panoramic view of the grounds of Taiwan Grand Shrine

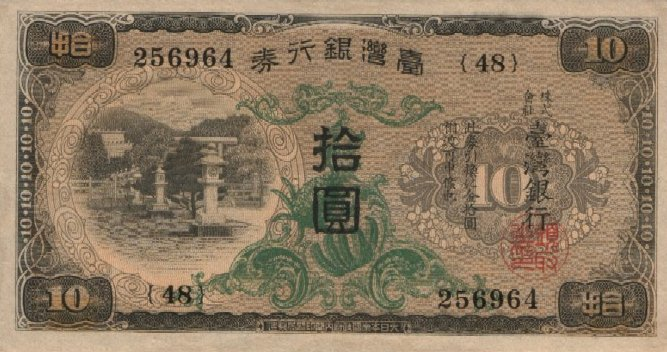
Taiwan banknotes (10 yen banknotes) during the Japanese colonial era with the Taiwan Grand Shrine printed

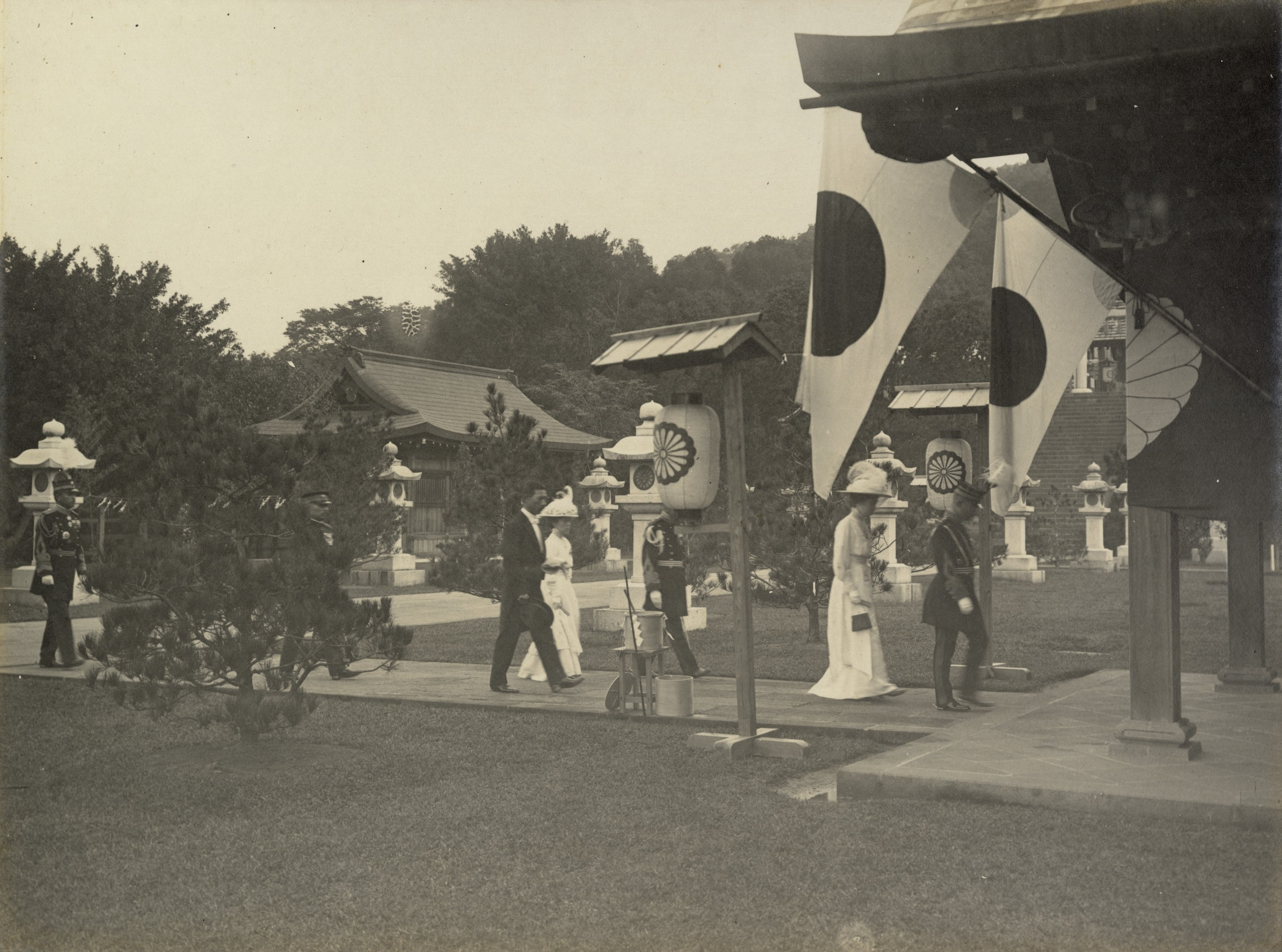
Prince Kitashirakawa Naruhisa visits the Taiwan Grand Shrine (October 28, 1917)

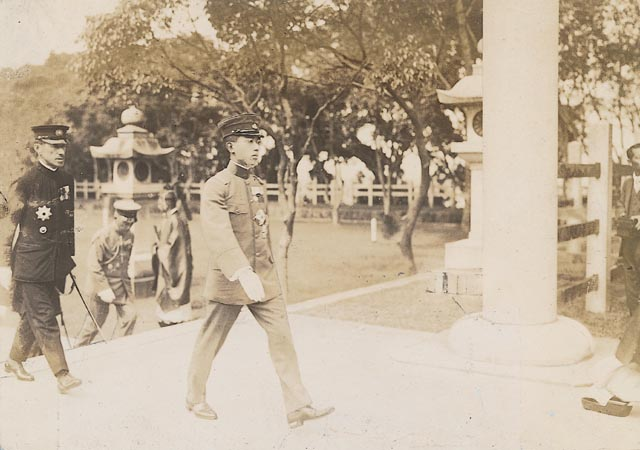
Crown Prince Hirohito visits the Taiwan Grand Shrine (April 17, 1923)

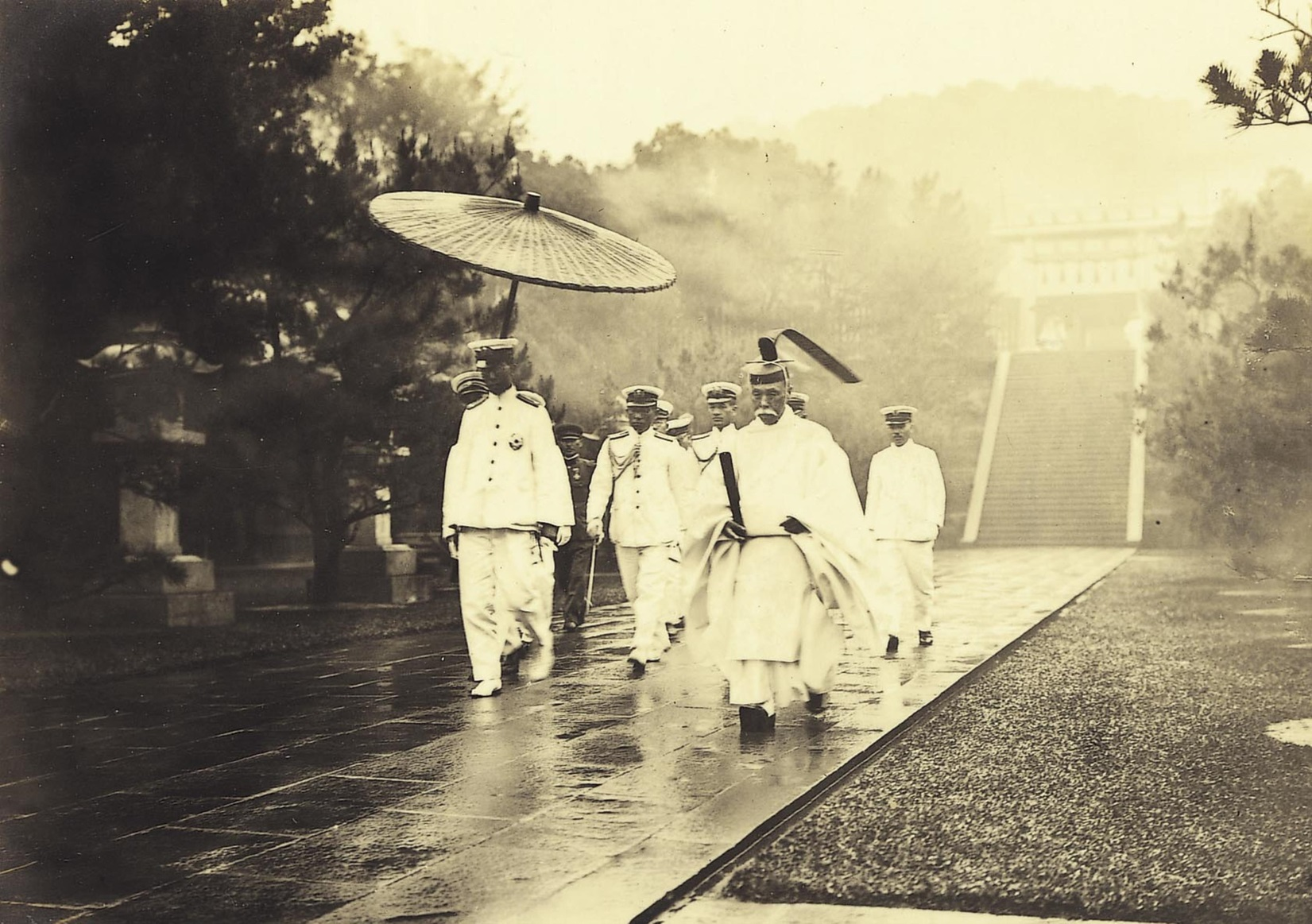
Prince Fushimi Hiroyoshi leaving the Taiwan Grand Shrine (May 13, 1929)

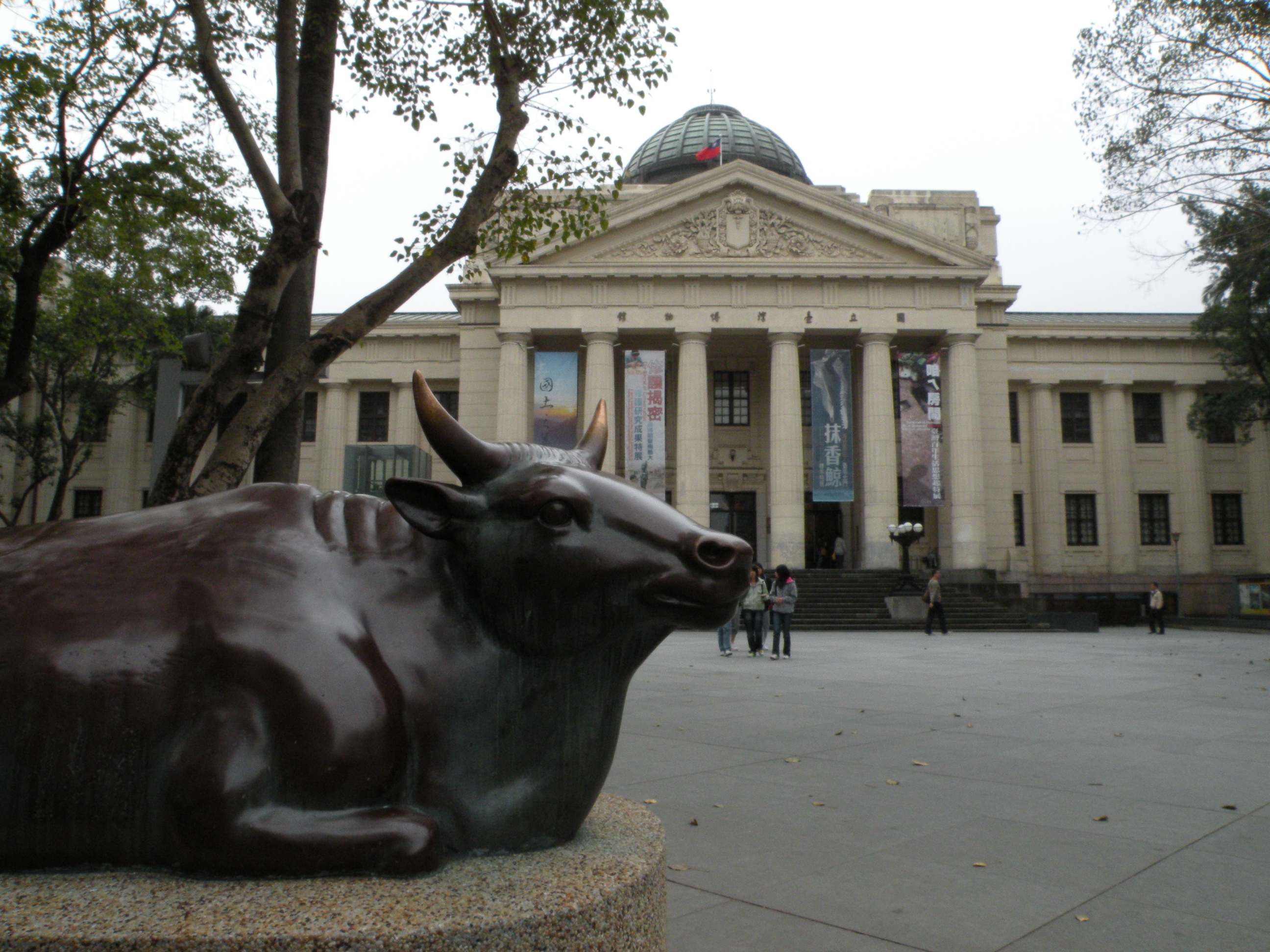
This copper bull was originally located at Taiwan Grand Shrine but was moved to in front of National Taiwan Museum after the end of World War II.

== See also ==
- Shinto in Taiwan
- List of Shinto shrines in Taiwan
