= Kaohsiung Martyrs' Shrine =

Martyrs' shrine in Gushan, Kaohsiung, Taiwan

- 高雄市忠烈祠
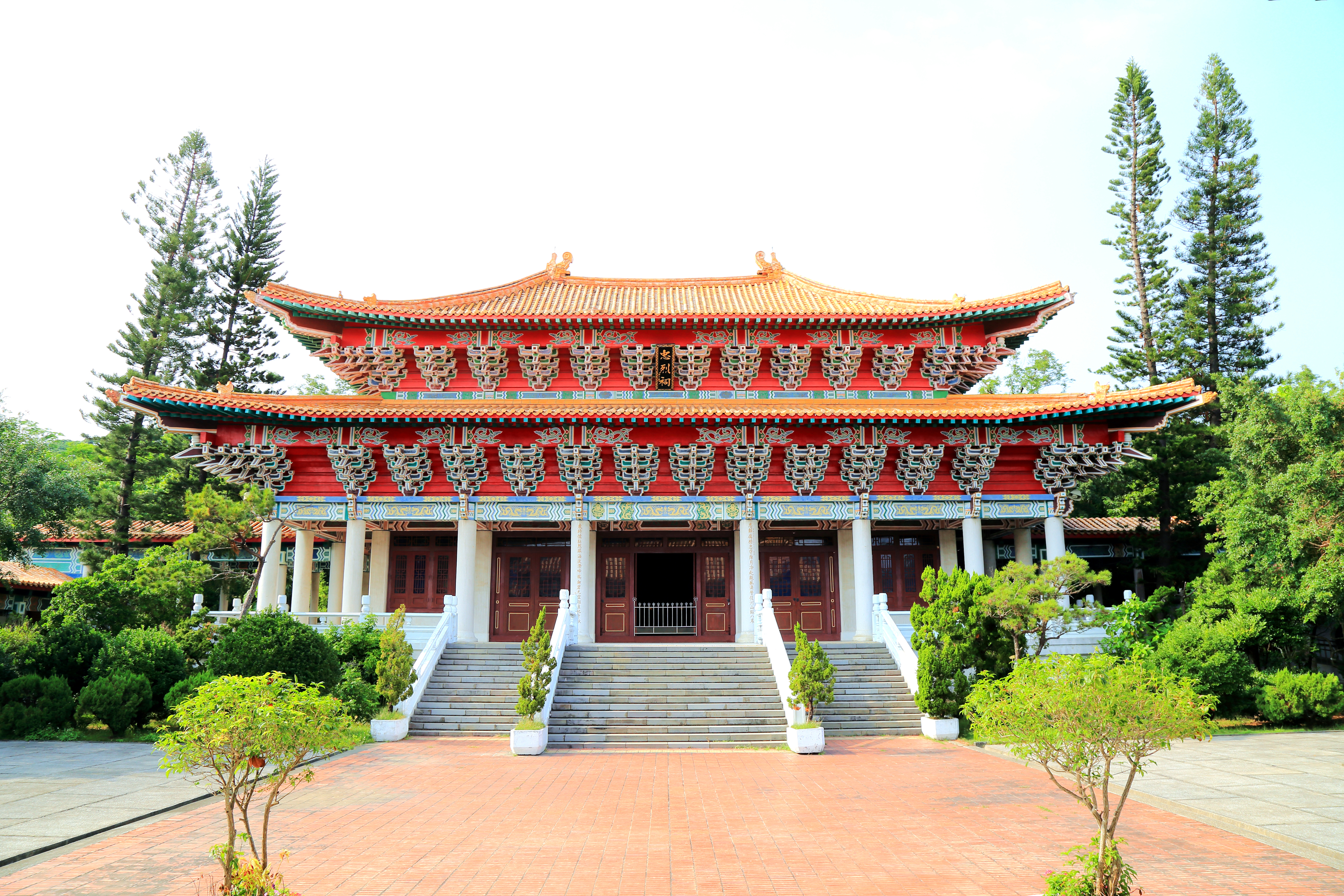

- Location within Kaohsiung Location within Taiwan

Location
- Location: Gushan, Kaohsiung, Taiwan
- Interactive map of Kaohsiung Martyrs' Shrine
- Coordinates: 22°37′34.5″N 120°16′25.9″E

Architecture
- Type: martyrs' Shrine
- Completed: 1929 (original building); 1978 (current building)

The Kaohsiung Martyrs' Shrine (Chinese: 高雄市忠烈祠; pinyin: Gāoxióng Shì Zhōngliècí) is a martyrs' shrine in Gushan District, Kaohsiung, Taiwan.

== History ==
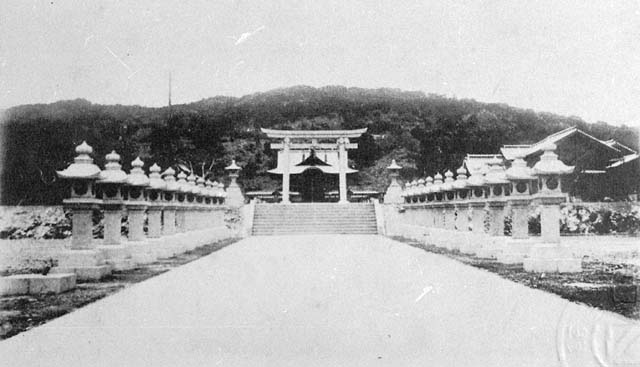
Takao Shrine

=== Empire of Japan ===
The site was originally established as Takao Kotohira Shrine during the Japanese rule of Taiwan in 1910 dedicated to Omononushi-no-Mikoto and Emperor Sutoku. In 1920, government of Takao Prefecture applied to the Taiwan Governor-General’s Office central government in Taihoku Prefecture for additional worshipping of Prince Yoshihisa and renamed the shrine as Takao Shrine.In 1926, upon acquisition of land on the hillside of Shoushan, fundraising was underway for the Shrine relocation, which was completed in 1929 and received the Kensha rank in 1932, officially listed in the Japanese state Shinto system.

=== Republic of China ===
In 1946 after the handover of Taiwan from Japan to the Republic of China, the shrine was slightly renovated to make it as a martyrs' shrine. In 1972, Japan switch diplomatic relation from Republic of China to People's Republic of China, triggering an outcry and the demolition of the shrine.

In 1973, Kaohsiung Mayor Wang Yu-yuin initiated the rebuilding of the shrine and it was completed in 1978 with the name Kaohsiung Martyrs' Shrine. The finished designed was modeled in comparison with National Revolutionary Martyrs' Shrine in Taipei, added the archive of revolution martyrs' historical artifacts and documents, VIP reception lounge and an office. To date, the Takao Shrine has been almost completely changed with only few remains of stone lanterns. In 2004, it received funds from Council for Cultural Affairs.

== Architecture ==
The main hall of the shrine assembles a traditional Chinese palace with double-hipped roof which is covered with golden glazed tiles. Sculpture of Gods and auspicious animals are placed on the roof ridge. Its structures are well decorated with colored paintings of Song dynasty characters. Around the shrine are cloisters made of cement and white artificial stones. In front of the shrine are the stairs made of andesite. It features a viewing platform with LOVE sign in place.

== Transportation ==
The site is accessible within walking distance north of Sizihwan Station of Kaohsiung MRT.

== See also ==
- National Revolutionary Martyrs' Shrine
- Takao Shrine
