= Takao Shrine =

Former Shinto shrine in Taiwan

Takao Shrine 高雄神社
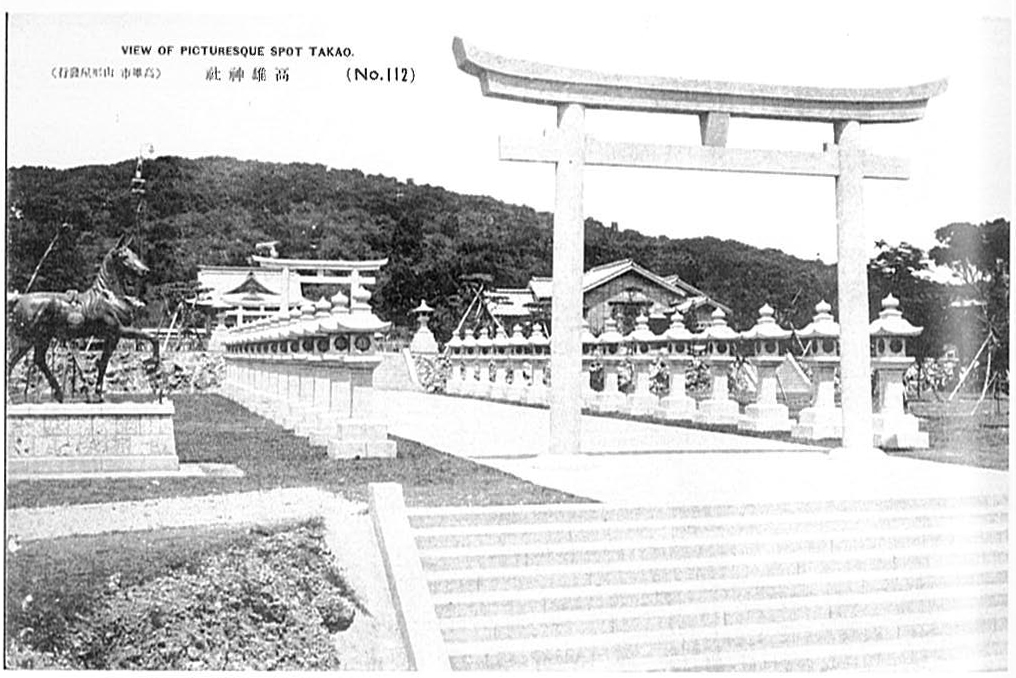
- Takao Shrine

Religion
- Affiliation: Shinto
- Deity: Prince Yoshihisa; Ōmononushi no Mikoto; Emperor Sutoku

Location
- Interactive map of Takao Shrine 高雄神社
- Coordinates: 22°37′35.2″N 120°16′25.7″E

Architecture
- Established: 1910
- Destroyed: 1974

Takao Shrine (高雄神社, Takao-jinja) was a Shinto shrine located in the former Takao City (now Kaohsiung), Takao Prefecture, Taiwan during the Japanese rule period. The shrine enshrined Prince Yoshihisa, Ōmononushi no Mikoto (大物主命), and Emperor Sutoku.

== History ==
The shrine was originally built at the foot of Kotobuki Hill as Takao Kotohira Shrine (打狗金刀比羅神社) in 1910. It was renamed Takao Shrine in 1920 and moved to the hillside in 1928. In 1932, the shrine received the kensha (県社) rank.

After 1945, the government of Republic of China transformed the Shinto shrine into the Kaohsiung Martyrs' Shrine (高雄市忠烈祠 Gāoxióng shì zhōngliècí). Most of the Japanese structures were demolished in the 1970s and rebuilt as a Chinese temple.

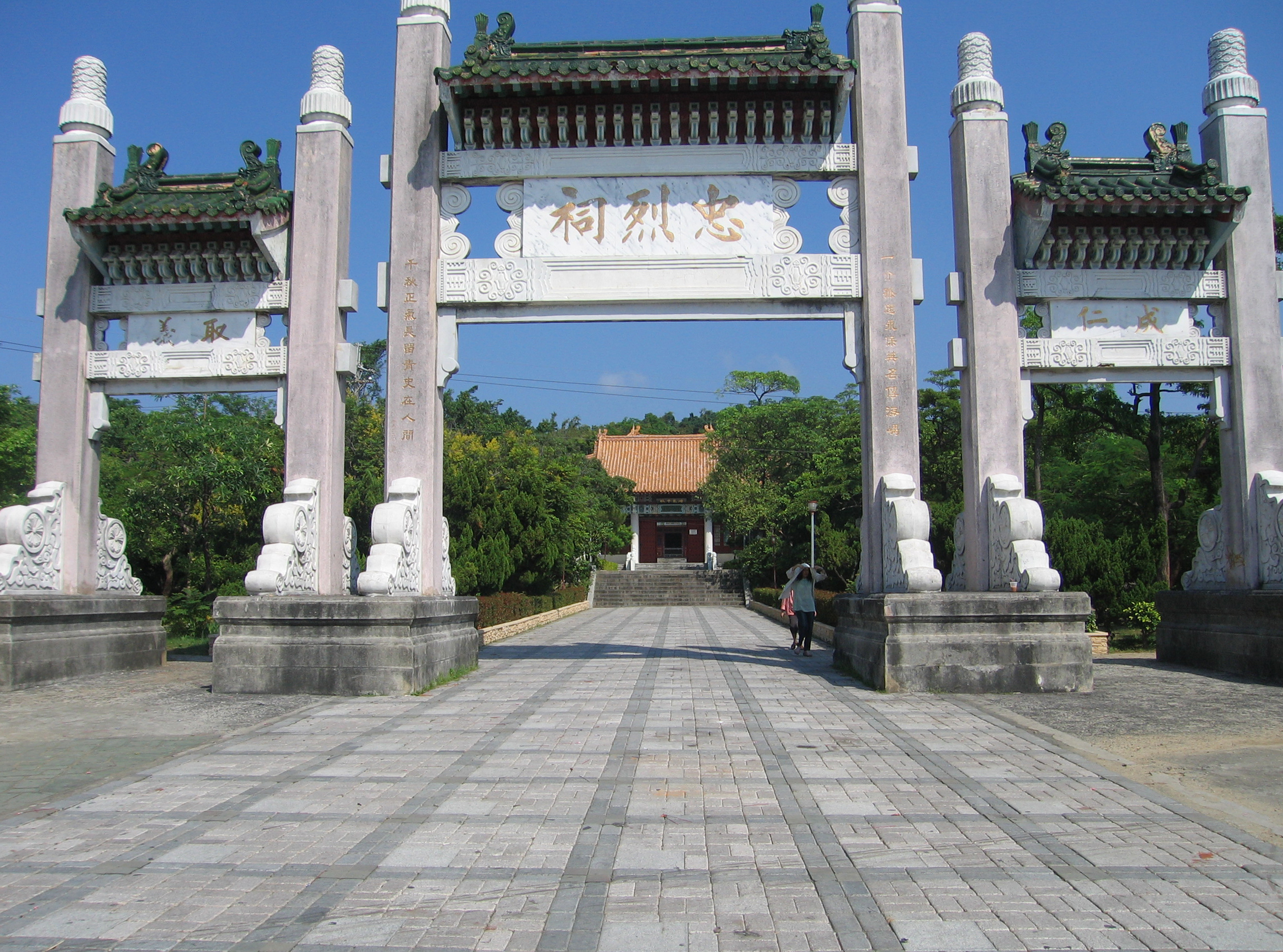
Kaohsiung Martyrs' Shrine

== See also ==
- History of Kaohsiung
- Kaohsiung Martyrs' Shrine
