= Kunci Temple =

Temple in Luye, Taitung County, Taiwan

- 崑慈堂
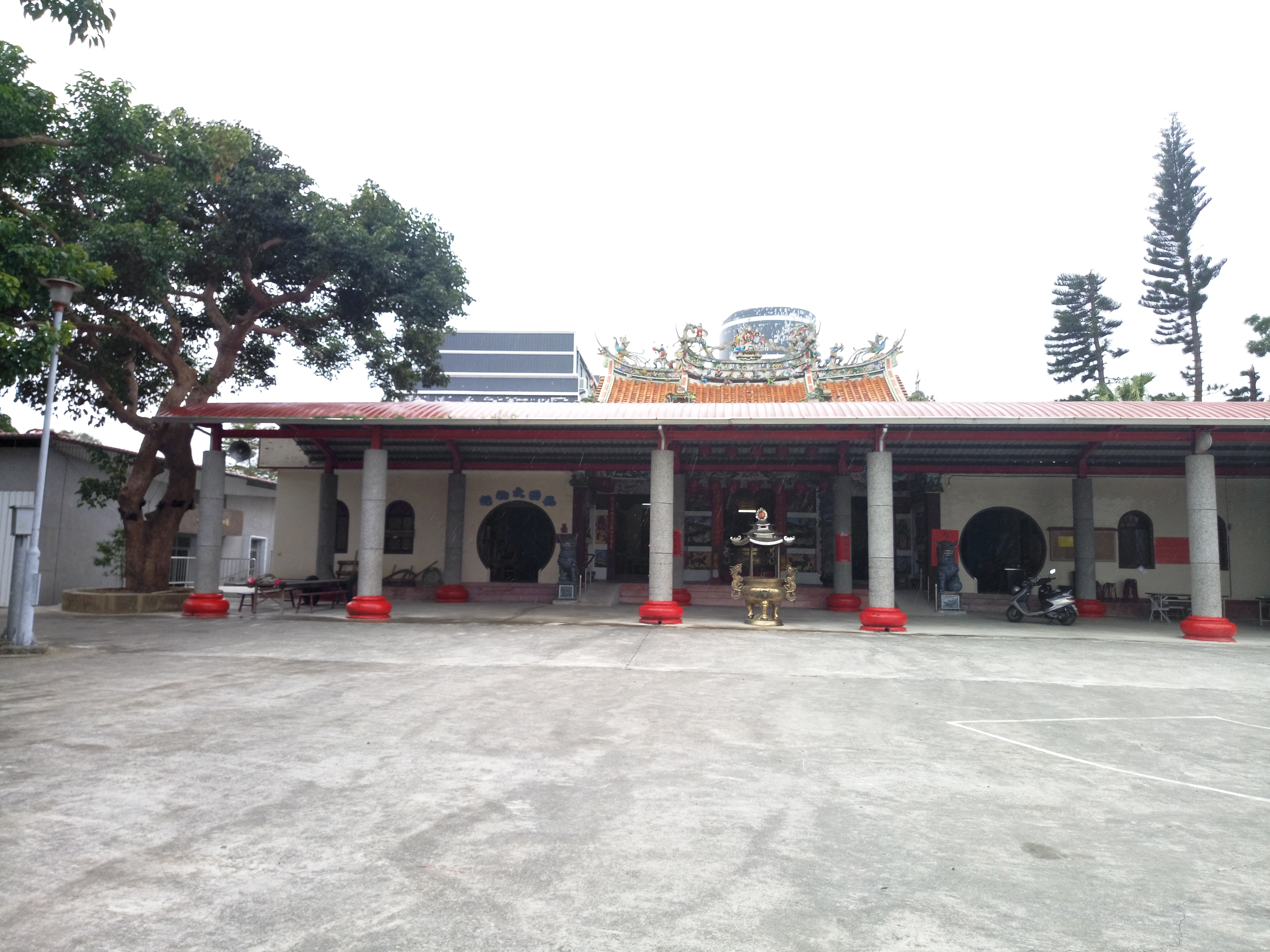
- Temple facade

Religion
- Affiliation: Taoism
- Deity: Queen Mother of the West

Location
- Location: Luye, Taitung
- Country: Taiwan
- Interactive map of Kunci Temple
- Coordinates: 22.9045°N 121.1205°E

Architecture
- Completed: 1958
- Direction of façade: East

Kunci Temple (Chinese: 崑慈堂; pinyin: Kūncí Táng) is a Taoist temple located in Longtian Village, Luye Township, Taitung County, Taiwan. The temple grounds contain a reconstructed Shinto shrine known as Luye Shrine (Chinese: 鹿野神社; pinyin: Lùyě Shénshè).

== History ==
Longtian sits on a large flat plain along the Beinan River. At the beginning of Japan's rule over Taiwan, the region was largely unpopulated. In 1912, the newly-founded Taitung Sugar Company acquired a tract of land as part of the government's "immigration village" program. The company wanted to use the land to plant sugarcane and persuaded a couple families from Niigata Prefecture to move to Longtian. Inside the new village, a small Shinto shrine was built on October 17, 1923 and moved to the current site of Kunci Temple on November 13, 1931. The shrine was dedicated to Prince Yoshihisa and the Kaitaku Sanjin, which is common for shrines in Taiwan.

When the Japanese left in 1945, the Han people that had been living nearby migrated into Longtian. They brought their former village's Tudigong and placed him in the old Shinto shrine to worship. In 1953, Lin Wending (林文定) moved to Longtian from Taipei and brought statues of Mazu and the Buddha to his home. At the time, Longtian residents had to travel very far to Cihui Temple (慈惠堂) to worship non-tutelary deities, so Longtian residents often visited Lin's house to worship instead. Therefore, in 1958, Lin and other villagers visited Cihui Temple and brought a copy of their Queen Mother of the West to Longtian. A small bamboo temple with a statue was completed on 1958.

The current reinforced concrete building was completed in 1982.

== Luye Shrine reconstruction ==
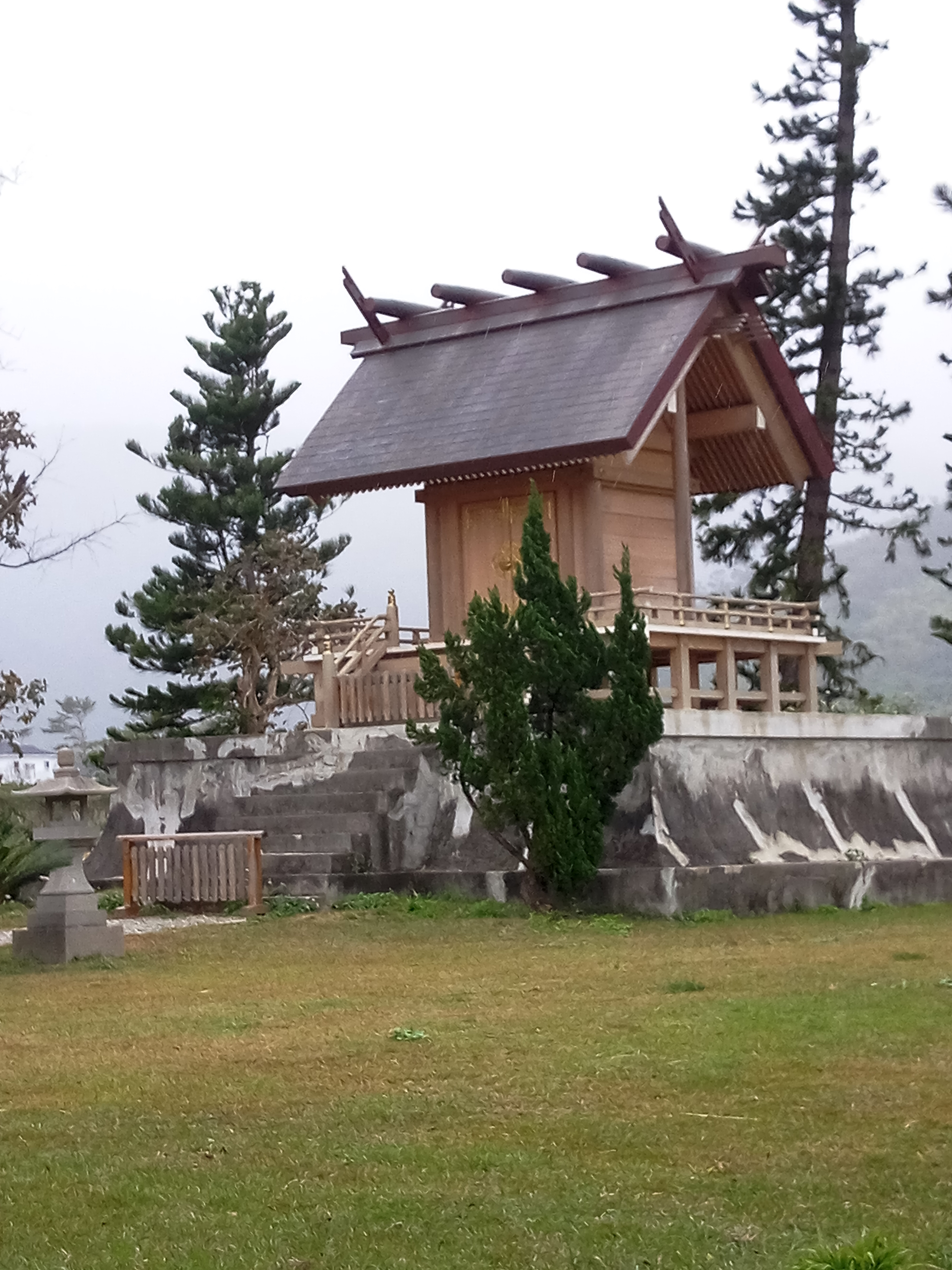
Luye Shrine

Completed on October 28, 2015, the new Luye shrine is the second Shinto shrine to be reconstructed in Taiwan post World War II, after Gaoshi Shrine. The Luye Township Government hired a team of Japanese craftsmen who referred to old pictures of the shrine to rebuild it. Unlike the original, which used the rare Taiwan red cypress, the new shrine is made of Japanese Hinoki cypress. The shrine does not house any deity and is not used for any religious purposes.

== Chinaberry tree ==
Outside of Kunci Temple, there is an eighty-year old chinaberry tree that is 20 m (66 ft) tall, which is more than two times bigger than the expected of the species. In 1960, Tzu Chi founder, Cheng Yen, who at the time just became a nun, stayed at Kunci Temple for two months and would often have Dharma talk with other monastics under the tree. Therefore, the tree is popular among Tzu Chi adherents.
