= Sugiura Shigemine =

Japanese fighter pilot (1923–1944)

- 杉浦 茂峰
- Born: November 9, 1923; Mito, Ibaraki, Japan
- Died: October 12, 1944 (aged 20); Tainan, Taiwan
- Education: Kasumigaura Air Base pilot training program
- Military career
- Allegiance: Empire of Japan
- Branch: Imperial Japanese Navy
- Rank: Second Lieutenant
- Unit: 201 Flying Squadron
- Conflicts: World War II; Formosa Air Battle †

Sugiura Shigemine (杉浦 茂峰, Sugiura Shigemine; November 9, 1923 – October 12, 1944) was a Japanese fighter pilot in World War II who is now recognised in Taiwan as the deity Feihu Jiangjun (Chinese: 飛虎將軍), or "General Flying Tiger."

== Biography ==
Sugiura was born in Mito, Ibaraki Prefecture, on 9 November 1923. As a youth he joined a pilot training program at the Imperial Navy's Kasumigaura Air Base, where he learned the basics of flying. After graduating he was sent to Taiwan for advanced training.

On 12 October 1944, a number of Allied planes appeared in the sky over the Haiwei area of southern Taiwan. Among the first to engage them was Second Lieutenant Sugiura, a pilot with the 201 Flying Squadron of the Imperial Japanese Navy. When Sugiura's Mitsubishi Zero was hit and caught fire, he steered his plane away from residential areas and was killed. His action spared the wooden houses and fish farming ponds upon which the local economy depended.

== Flying Tiger Temple ==
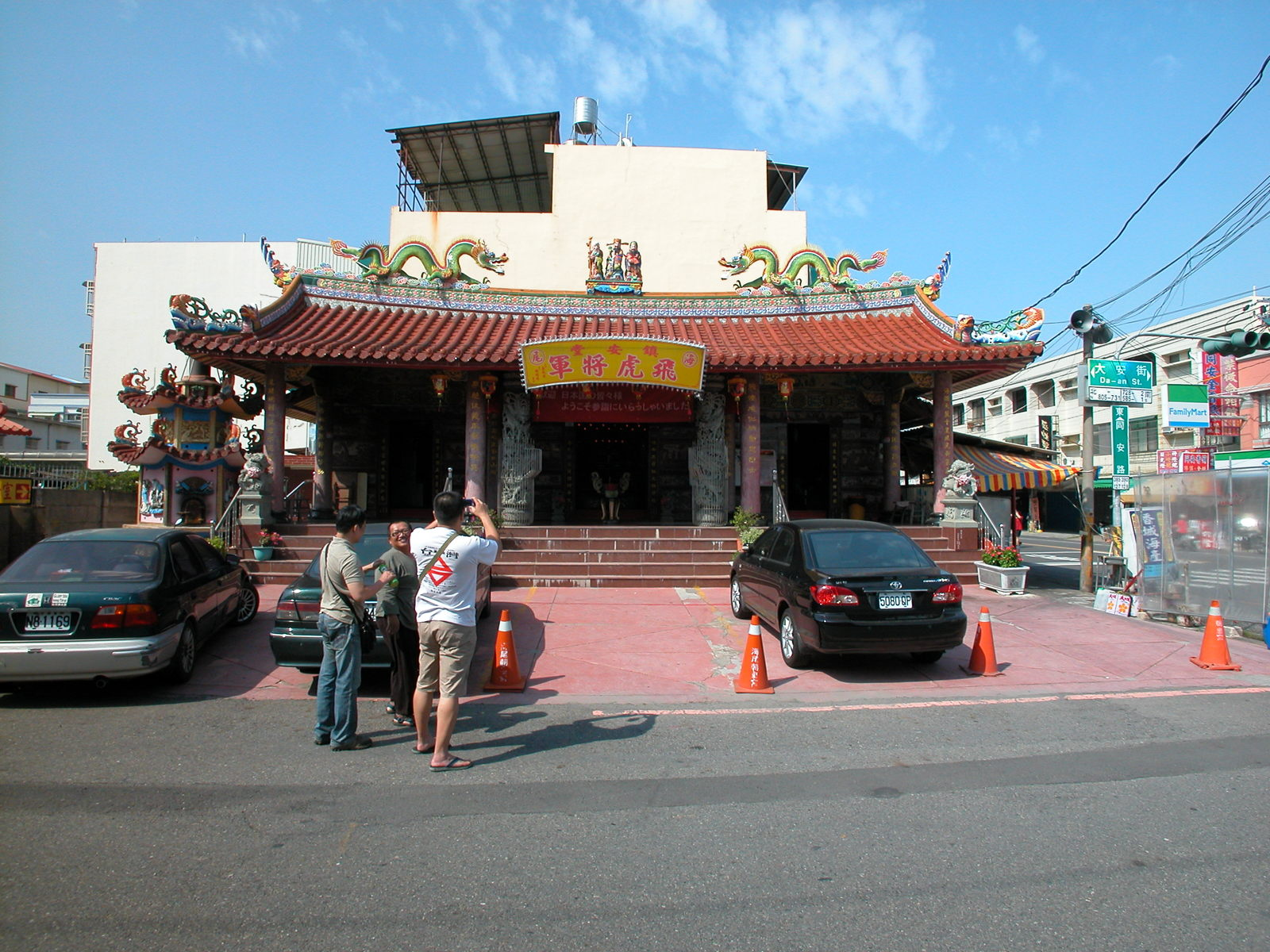
Flying Tiger Temple in Tainan, Taiwan

In later years, a number of villagers claimed to have had supernatural experiences relating to the heroic pilot. In 1971, at the location of the crash site, a temple was built in Tainan in Sugiura's honour, called the Flying Tiger or Chen-an Temple. In 1993 a larger temple building was constructed, to cater for the many visitors from Japan. Temple manager Hsieh Chu-ji says all requests are granted, "except for wealth." Daily ceremonies occur, in which worshipers play the Japanese national anthem Kimigayo and light cigarettes to honor Sugiura. In the evening the gunka Umi Yukaba is played.
