= Kunitama =

Japanese category of deities

A kunitama (Japanese: 国魂; lit. "land soul") is a kami said to represent the spirit of the land itself who also care for the land alongside humans. The concept of kunitama was used in the Japanese Empire's overseas territories to deify local spirits and ancestors as an initial step for settling these territories.
