= Koxinga Shrine =

Temple in Taiwan, formerly a Shinto Shrine

Coordinates: 22.9878°N 120.2077°E

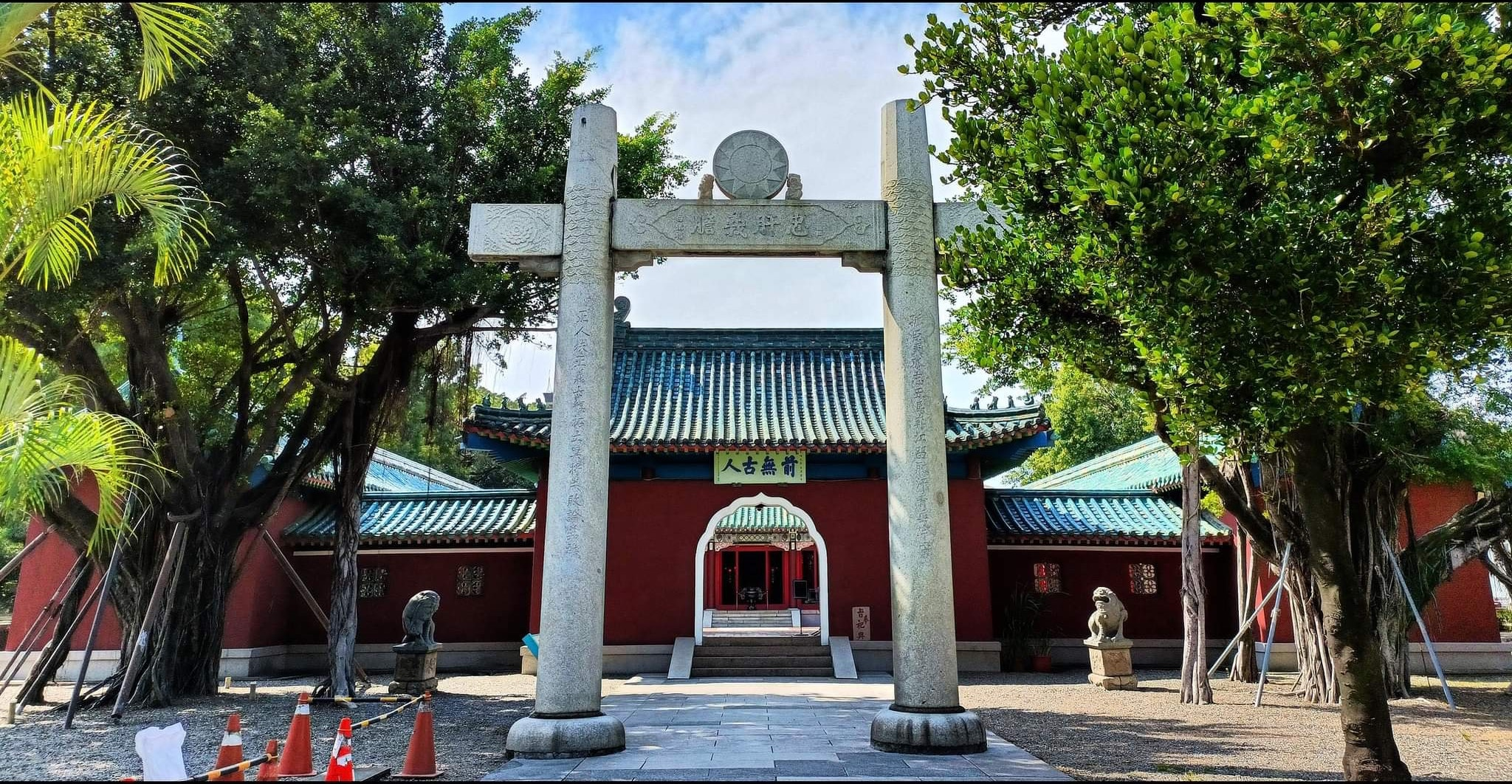

Religion
- Affiliation: Chinese folk religion Shinto (1897 - 1947)
- Prefecture: Tainan City
- Deity: Koxinga

Location
- Interactive map of Koxinga Shrine
- Prefecture: Tainan City

Koxinga Shrine (Chinese: 延平郡王祠) is a Taiwanese historical temple originally known as Kaishan Temple (Chinese: 開山王廟). Located in Tainan, Taiwan, it was built in honor of Koxinga.

== See also ==
- Koxinga Ancestral Shrine
- Tainan Shrine
