= Tainan Shrine =

Shinto shrine in Taiwan

- 台南神社
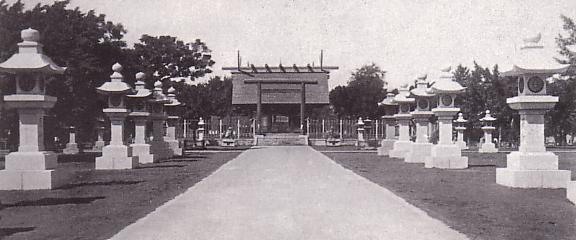

Religion
- Affiliation: Shinto
- Deity: Prince Kitashirakawa Yoshihisa
- Year consecrated: 1920

Location
- Municipality: Tainan
- Country: Taiwan under Japanese rule
- Interactive map of Tainan Shrine
- Coordinates: 22°59′22.7″N 120°12′9.7″E

Tainan Shrine (Japanese: 台南神社, romanized: tainan jinja) was a Shinto shrine built in Tainan, Taiwan by the Empire of Japan. It houses the deity of Prince Kitashirakawa Yoshihisa.
