= Gaoshi Shrine =

Shinto shrine in Mudan, Pingtung County, Taiwan

- 高士神社
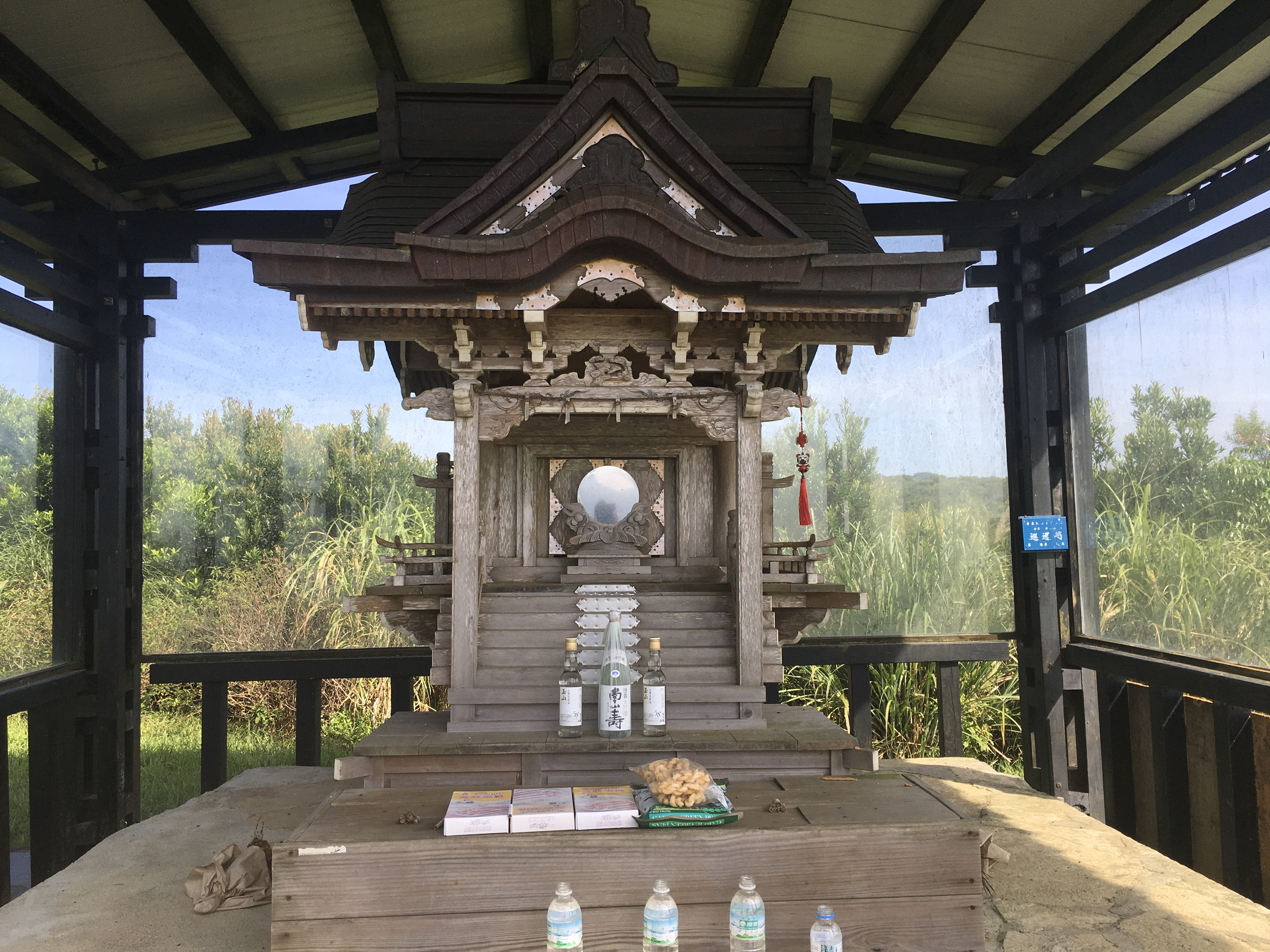

Religion
- Affiliation: Original: Shinto; Current: None
- Deity: Original: Amaterasu; Current: None

Location
- Location: Mudan, Pingtung
- Country: Taiwan
- Interactive map of Gaoshi Shrine
- Coordinates: 22°07′21″N 120°50′20″E

Architecture
- Established: First: 1939; Reconstructed: 2015
- Materials: Hinoki wood and concrete

Gaoshi Shrine (Chinese: 高士神社; pinyin: Gāoshì Shénshè), formerly known as Kuskus Shrine (クスクス祠, Kusukusu Jinjya), is a Shinto shrine located in Gaoshi, a Paiwan village in Mudan, Pingtung, Taiwan. With the original shrine destroyed by typhoon in 1946, a new shrine was rebuilt in 2015, making it the first Shinto shrine constructed in Taiwan in the post–World War II era, following the end of the island's Japanese rule. The current shrine is not affiliated with the Shinto religion (or any other deity) but serves as a memorial for the Taiwanese population lost in wars such as World War II.

== History ==
The shrine was originally built in 1939 during the Japanese rule of Taiwan, but was destroyed in 1946 due to typhoon damage. The village's residents wished to rebuild the shrine but could not, as reconstruction was prohibited under martial law at the time. The only surviving portion of the shrine was its concrete base.

In 2015, a kannushi named Ken'ichi Satō (佐藤健一) learned of the shrine's existence through the Friends of Lee Teng-Hui Association (台灣李登輝之友會總會) in Japan, a cultural exchange organization based in Tokyo. Satō decided to rebuild the shrine as a token of appreciation for Taiwan's foreign aid in the 2011 Tōhoku earthquake. The shrine cost JP¥10,000,000 to build.

An opening ceremony was held on 11–12 August 2015 to celebrate the shrine's completion. It involved a Shinto ceremony conducted by Satō, traditional Paiwan dances, and a prayer led by the local pastor, since the majority of Gaoshi's population is Christian.

== Structure ==
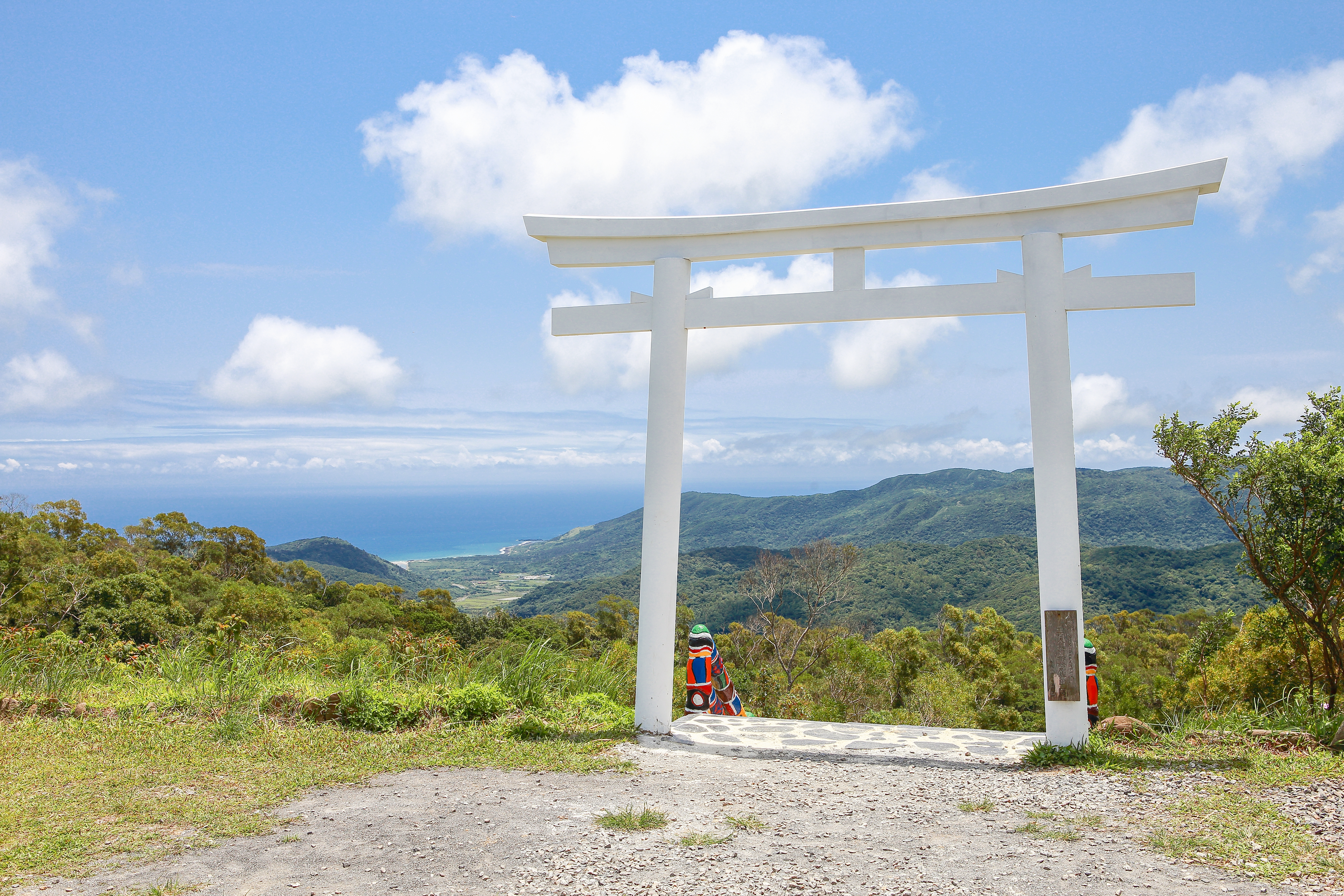
The shrine's white torii

No records of the original structure exist. The rebuilt shrine is made of hinoki wood, while the roof is covered in copper. In 2016, a white torii, also made of hinoki, was added in front of the shrine.

== See also ==
- List of Shinto shrines in Taiwan
- Japanese invasion of Taiwan (1874)
- Luye Shrine
