= Prince Kitashirakawa Yoshihisa =

Japanese politician

His Imperial Highness Yoshihisa Prince Kitashirakawa
- 北白川宮能久親王
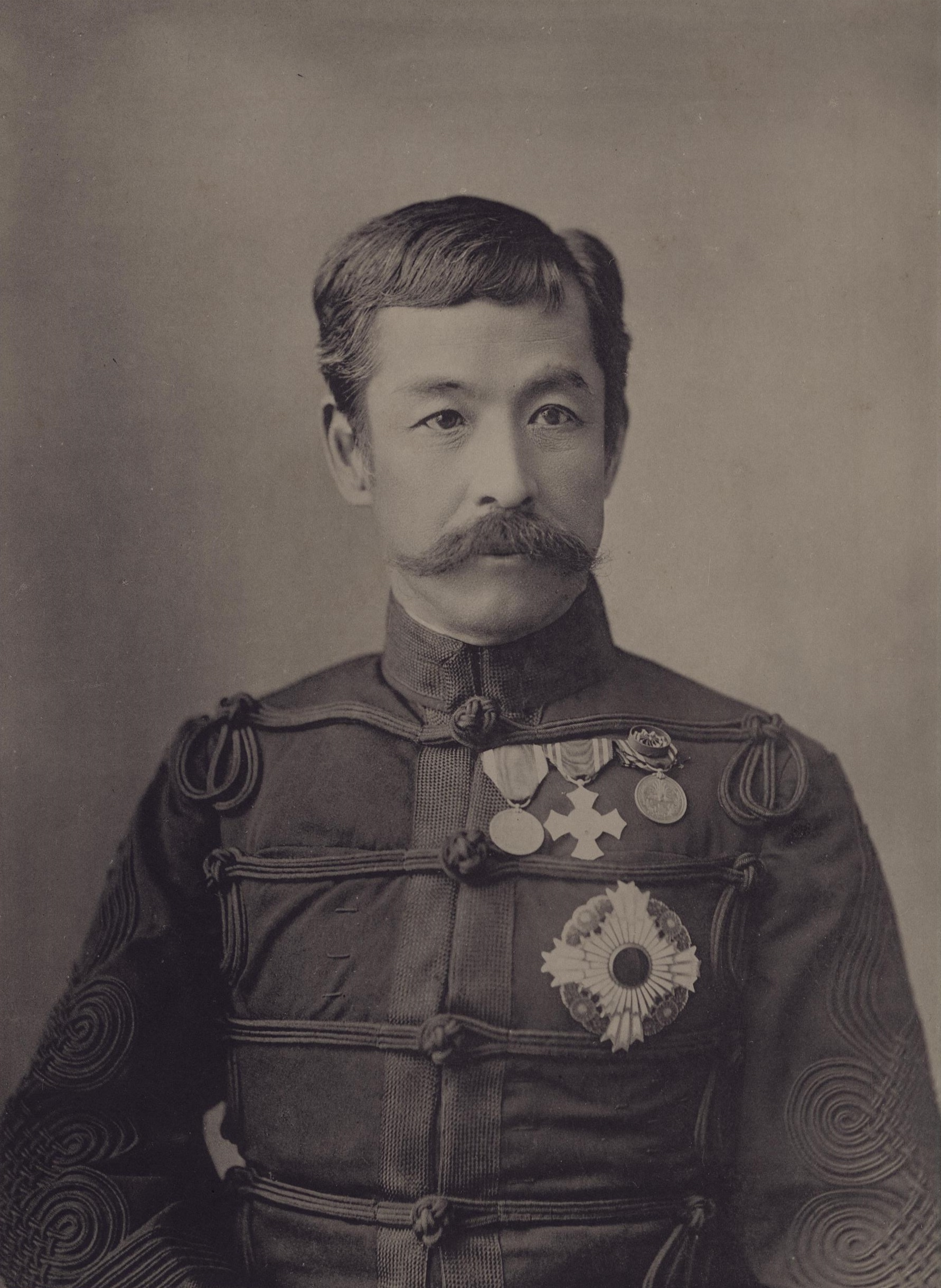
- Born: 1 April 1847; Kyoto, Yamashiro, Japan
- Died: 27 October 1895 (aged 48); Tainan, Japanese Taiwan
- Military career
- Allegiance: Empire of Japan
- Branch: Imperial Japanese Army
- Service years: 1887–1895
- Rank: Lieutenant General
- Commands: 4th Division; 1st Division
- Conflicts: Taiwan Expedition of 1874; First Sino-Japanese War; Japanese invasion of Taiwan (1895)

Member of the House of Peers
- In office February 1890 – 27 October 1895 Hereditary peerage

Yoshihisa, Prince Kitashirakawa (北白川宮能久親王, Kitashirakawa-no-miya Yoshihisa-shinnō; 1 April 1847 – 27 October 1895) of Japan, was the second head of a collateral branch of the Japanese imperial family. He was formerly enshrined in Tainan-Jinja, Taiwan, under the name Kitashirakawa no Miya Yoshihisa-shinnō no Mikoto as the main and only deity.

== Biography ==
=== Early life ===
Prince Kitashirakawa Yoshihisa was the ninth son of Prince Fushimi Kuniie (1802–1875) with Horiuchi Nobuko. He entered the Buddhist priesthood under the title Rinnoji-no-miya. He served as abbot of Kan'ei-ji in Edo.

=== Bakumatsu period ===
During the unrest of the Boshin War to overthrow the Tokugawa shogunate, Prince Yoshihisa fled north with Tokugawa partisans of the following the Satsuma-Chōshū takeover of the city of Edo, and was made the nominal head of the "Northern Alliance" (Ōuetsu Reppan Dōmei). This short-lived alliance consisted of almost all of the domains of northern Japan under the leadership of Date Yoshikuni of Sendai. Documents exist which name Prince Yoshihisa as "Emperor Tōbu" (Tōbu-tennō (東武天皇) or Tōbu-kōtei (東武皇帝)), and delineate the holders of the chief positions of a new, northern court; however, historians are divided as to whether or not Prince Yoshihisa was actually named emperor. Depending on the source, Prince Yoshihisa's planned era name (nengō) is believed to have been either Taisei (大政) or Enju (延寿).

Following the Meiji Restoration, in 1873 Emperor Meiji recalled all imperial princes currently serving as Buddhist priests back to secular status. That same year he succeeded his younger brother, Prince Kitashirakawa Kasunari, as the second head of the new princely house of Kitashirakawa-no-miya.

=== Marriage and family ===
On 10 July 1886, Prince Kitashirakawa Yoshihisa married Shimazu Tomiko (1 October 1862 – 20 March 1936), the adopted daughter of Prince Shimazu Hisamitsu of Satsuma Domain. The marriage produced one child:

- Prince Kitashirakawa Naruhisa (18 April 1887 – 2 April 1923)

Also, Prince Yoshihisa had five sons and five daughters by various concubines, as was common practice for the time:

- Prince Tsunehisa Takeda (22 September 1882 – 23 April 1919)
- Prince Nobuhisa (28 August 1885 – 28 June 1886)
- Countess Kanroji Mitsuko (19 October 1885 – 16 July 1975)
- Count Futara Yoshiaki (26 October 1886 – 18 April 1909)
- Countess Arima Sadako (6 August 1887 – 16 August 1964)
- Marquis Komatsu Teruhisa (2 August 1888 – 5 November 1970)
- Viscountess Hoshina Takeko (28 March 1890 – 18 March 1977)
- Count Ueno Masao (16 July 1890 – 16 February 1965)
- Princess Kotoko (20 December 1891 – 22 January 1892)
- Countess Futara Hiroko (28 May 1895 – 7 March 1990)

=== Military career ===
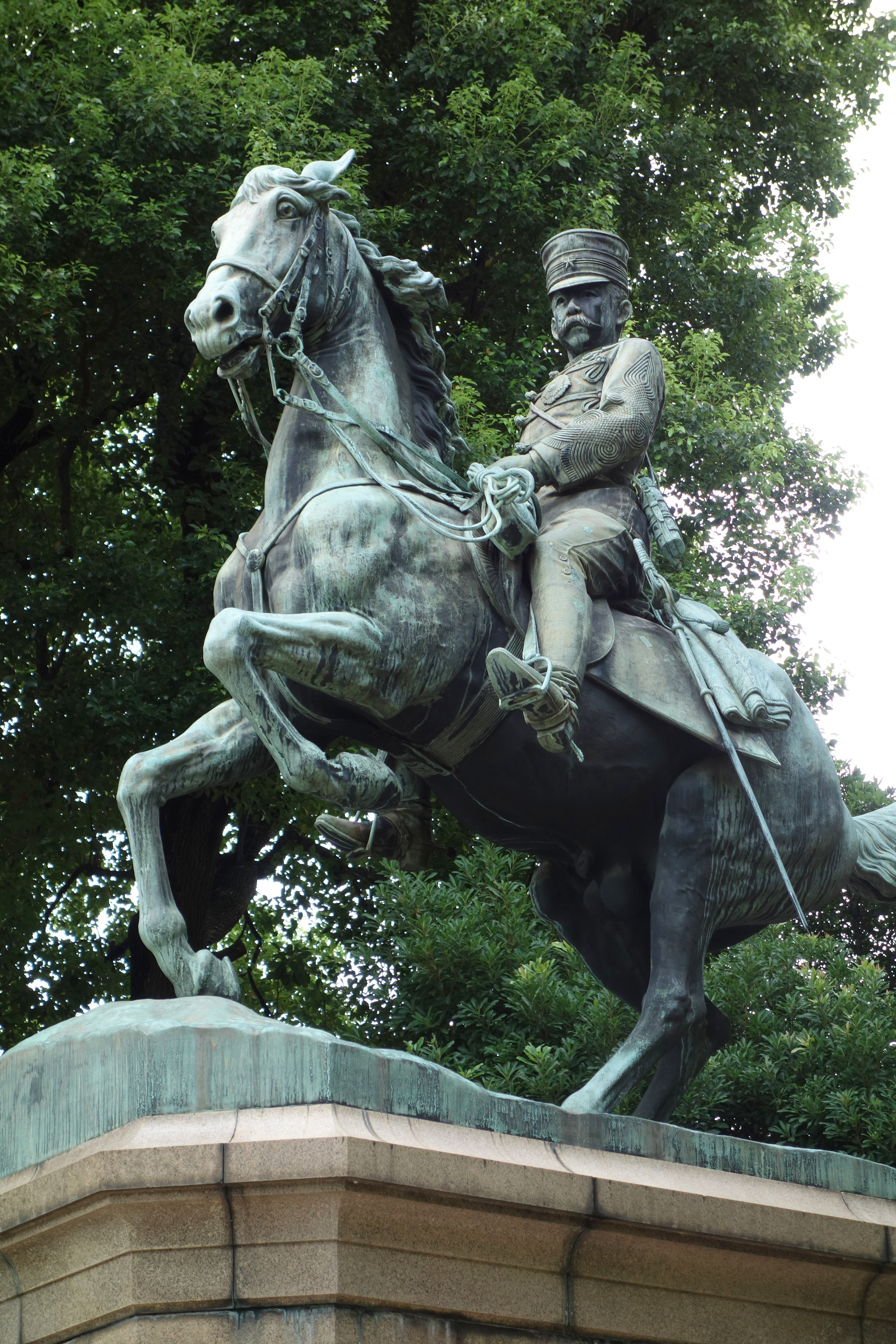
Equestrian monument to Prince Kitashirakawa in Kitanomaru Park, located north of the Tokyo Imperial Palace

Prince Kitashirakawa Yoshihisa became a professional soldier, and was sent to Germany for military training. On his return to Japan in 1887, he was commissioned as a major general in the Imperial Japanese Army. In 1893, as lieutenant general, he was given command of the 4th Division. After the outbreak of the First Sino-Japanese War of 1894–1895, he was transferred to the elite 1st Division and participated in the Japanese invasion of Taiwan. During the invasion, he contracted malaria and died outside of Tainan (although there were rumors that he was killed in action by Taiwanese guerrillas). Prince Kitashirakawa Yoshihisa is thus the first member of the Japanese imperial family known to have died outside Japan, and the first (in modern times) to have died in war. Under State Shinto, he was elevated to a kami, and was enshrined in most of the Shinto shrines erected in Taiwan under Japanese rule, as well as in Yasukuni Jinja.

== Honours ==
=== National ===
- Grand Cordon of the Order of the Rising Sun, 31 December 1875
- Grand Cordon of the Supreme Order of the Chrysanthemum, 29 December 1886
- Collar of the Order of the Chrysanthemum, 1 November 1895; posthumous
- Order of the Golden Kite, 3rd class, 1 November 1895; posthumous

=== Foreign ===
- German Empire:
  - Kingdom of Prussia:
    - Knight of the Prussian Crown, 1st Class, 9 June 1881
    - Grand Cross of the Red Eagle, 2 December 1889
  - Mecklenburg:
    - Grand Cross of the Griffon, 10 February 1885
    - Grand Cross of the Wendish Crown with Crown in Ore, 24 April 1895
- Kingdom of Hawaii: Knight Grand Cross of the Kamehameha I, 27 March 1883
- Russian Empire: Order of St. Alexander Nevsky, 11 April 1892
- Austria-Hungary: Knight Grand Cross of the Leopold, 21 August 1893

== Gallery ==
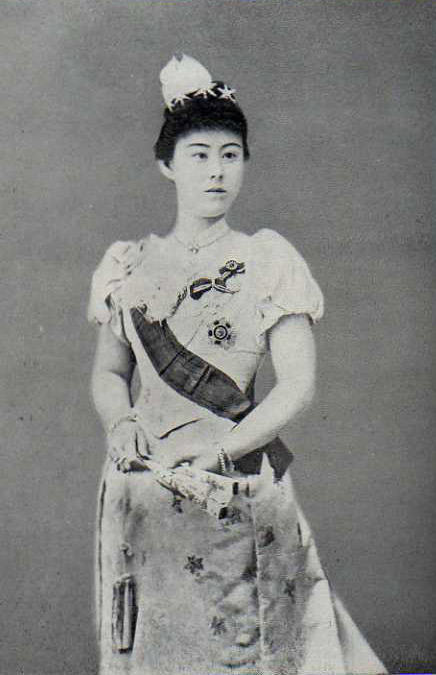
Princess Kitashirakawa Tomiko, consort

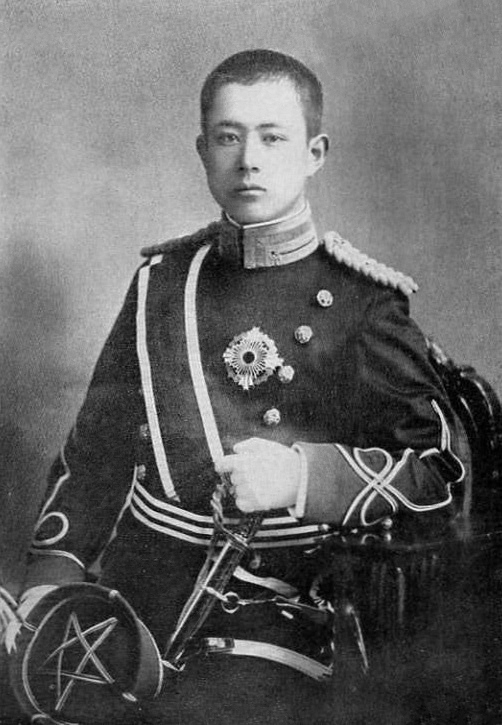
Prince Kitashirakawa Naruhisa, heir
