= Nara period =

Historical period of Japan from CE 710 to 794

- 710–794
Asuka period	Heian period
- Gokishichidō system showing ancient regions and provinces during the Nara period after the introduction of the Yōrō Code (720)
- Location: Japan
- Leaders: Genmei (710–721); Emperor Kanmu (781–794)
- Key events: Japanese smallpox epidemic (735–737); Fujiwara no Hirotsugu rebellion (740); Yōrō Code promulgated (757)

The Nara period (奈良時代, Nara jidai; Japanese pronunciation: [na.ɾa (d)ʑiꜜ.dai]) of the history of Japan covers the years from 710 to 794. It succeeded the Asuka period and is followed by the Heian period. Empress Genmei established the capital of Heijō-kyō (present-day Nara). Except for a five-year period (740–745), when the capital was briefly moved again, it remained the capital of Japanese civilization until Emperor Kanmu established a new capital, Nagaoka-kyō, in 784, before moving to Heian-kyō, modern Kyoto, a decade later in 794.

Japanese society during this period was predominantly agricultural and centered on village life. Most of the villagers followed Shintō, a religion based on the worship of natural and ancestral spirits named kami.

The capital at Nara was modeled after Chang'an, the capital city of the Tang dynasty. In many other ways, the Japanese upper classes patterned themselves after the Chinese, including adopting the Chinese writing system, Chinese fashion, and Chinese schools of Buddhism.

== Literature ==
Concerted efforts by the imperial court to record its history produced the first works of Japanese literature during the Nara period. Works such as the Kojiki and the Nihon Shoki were political, used to record and therefore justify and establish the supremacy of the rule of the emperors within Japan.

With the spread of written language, the writing of Japanese poetry, known in Japanese as waka, began. The largest and longest-surviving collection of Japanese poetry, the Man'yōshū, was compiled from poems mostly composed between 600 and 759 CE. This, and other Nara texts, used Chinese characters to express the sounds of Japanese, known as man'yōgana.

== Economic, livelihood, and administrative developments ==
Gokishichidō system showing ancient regions and provinces during the Nara period after the introduction of the Yōrō Code (720): Kinai / Tōkaidō / Tōsandō / Hokurikudō; San’indō / San’yōdō / Nankaidō / Saikaidō

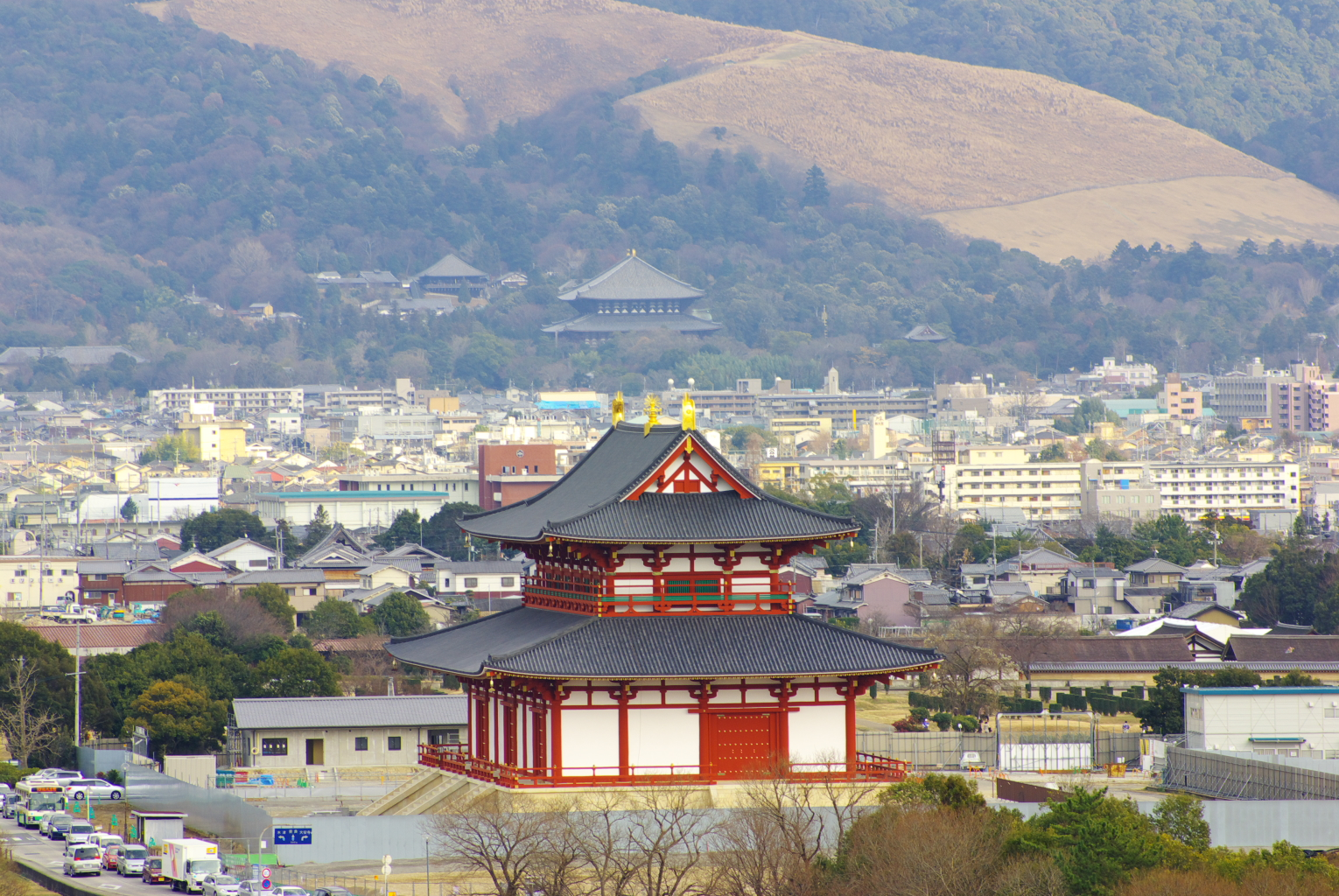
The primary building, i.e. the Daigoku-den at the Heijō Palace (In the center of the photograph: this is a modern version built for the 1300th anniversary of Nara becoming Japan's capital). Tōdai-ji's Daibutsuden and Wakakusayama can be seen in the rear (January 2010).

Before the Taihō Code was established, the capital was customarily moved after the death of an emperor because of the ancient belief that a place of death was polluted. Reforms and bureaucratization of government led to the establishment of a permanent imperial capital at Heijō-kyō, or Nara, in AD 710. The capital was moved shortly (for reasons described later in this section) to Kuni-kyō (present-day Kizugawa) in 740–744, to Naniwa-kyō (present-day Osaka) in 744–745, to Shigarakinomiya (紫香楽宮, present-day Shigaraki) in 745, and moved back to Nara in 745. Nara was Japan's first truly urban center. It soon had a population of 200,000 (representing nearly 7% of the country's population) and some 10,000 people worked in government jobs.

Economic and administrative activity increased during the Nara period. Roads linked Nara to provincial capitals, and taxes were collected more efficiently and routinely. Coins were minted, if not widely used. Outside the Nara area, there was little commercial activity, and in the provinces the old Shōtoku land reform systems declined. By the mid-eighth century, shōen (landed estates), one of the most important economic institutions in prehistoric Japan, began to rise as a result of the search for a more manageable form of landholding. Local administration gradually became more self-sufficient, while the breakdown of the old land distribution system and the rise of taxes led to the loss or abandonment of land by many people who became the "wave people" (furōsha). Some of these formerly "public people" were privately employed by large landholders, and "public lands" increasingly reverted to the shōen.

Factional fighting at the imperial court continued throughout the Nara period. Imperial family members, leading court families, such as the Fujiwara, and Buddhist priests all contended for influence. Earlier during this period, Prince Nagaya seized power at the court after the death of Fujiwara no Fuhito. Fuhito was succeeded by four sons, Muchimaro, Umakai, Fusasaki, and Maro. They put Emperor Shōmu, the prince by Fuhito's daughter, on the throne. In 729, they arrested Nagaya and regained control. As a major outbreak of smallpox spread from Kyūshū in 735, all four brothers died two years later, resulting in temporary reduction in the Fujiwara dominance. In 740, a member of the Fujiwara clan, Hirotsugu, launched a rebellion from his base in Fukuoka, Kyushu. Although the rebellion was defeated, there is no doubt that the emperor was shocked and frightened by these events, and he moved the palace three times in only five years from 740, until he eventually returned to Nara.

The Yōrō Code which had been compiled during the Yōrō era around 718, was finally promulgated in 757 during the rule of Fujiwara no Nakamaro under Empress Kōken's reign, even though it was a revision of the earlier Taiho Code which had been in use since Asuka period.

In the late Nara period, financial burdens on the state increased, and the court began dismissing nonessential officials. In 792 universal conscription was abandoned, and district heads were allowed to establish private militia forces for local police work. Decentralization of authority became the rule despite the reforms of the Nara period. Eventually, to return control to imperial hands, the capital was moved in 784 to Nagaoka-kyō and in 794 to Heian-kyō (literally Capital of Peace and Tranquility), about twenty-six kilometers north of Nara. By the late eleventh century, the city was popularly called Kyoto (capital city), the name it has had ever since.

== Cultural developments and the establishment of Buddhism ==
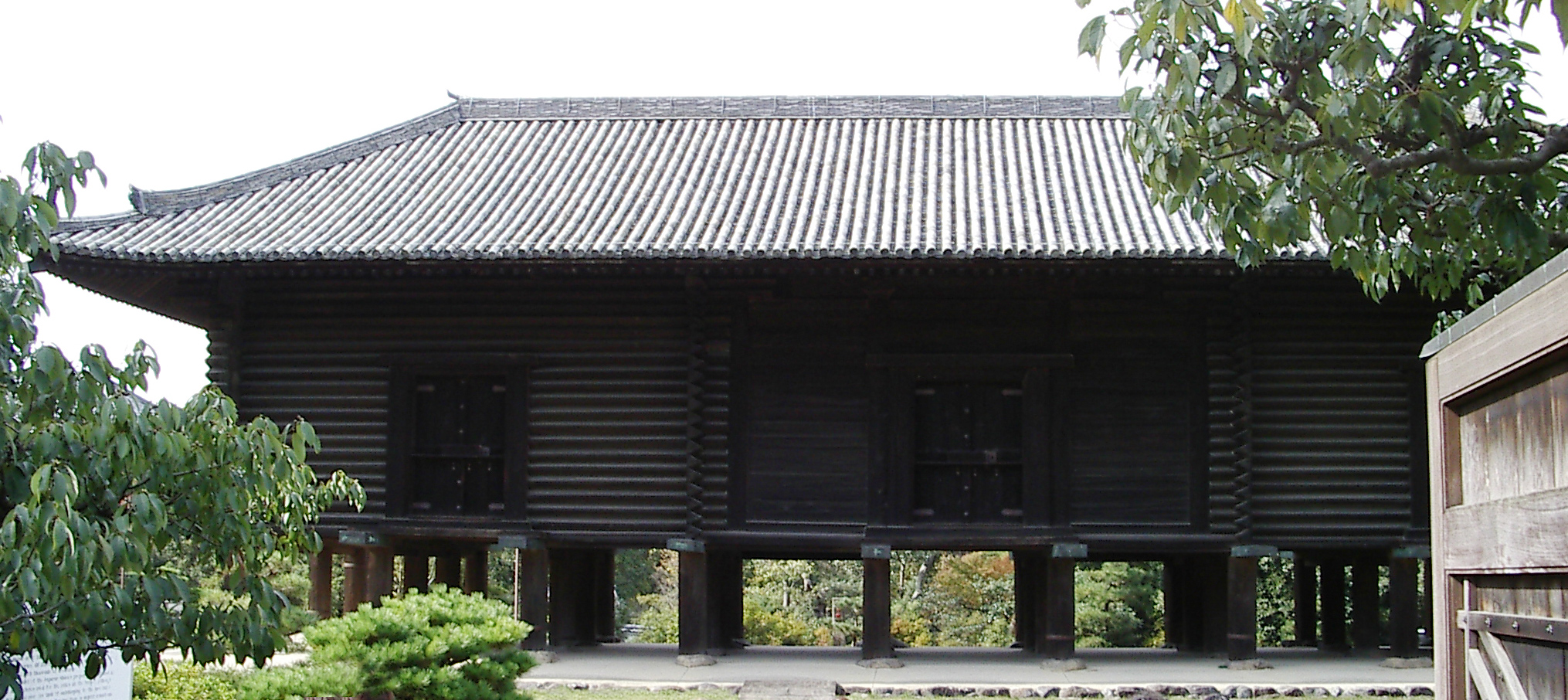
Shōsōin

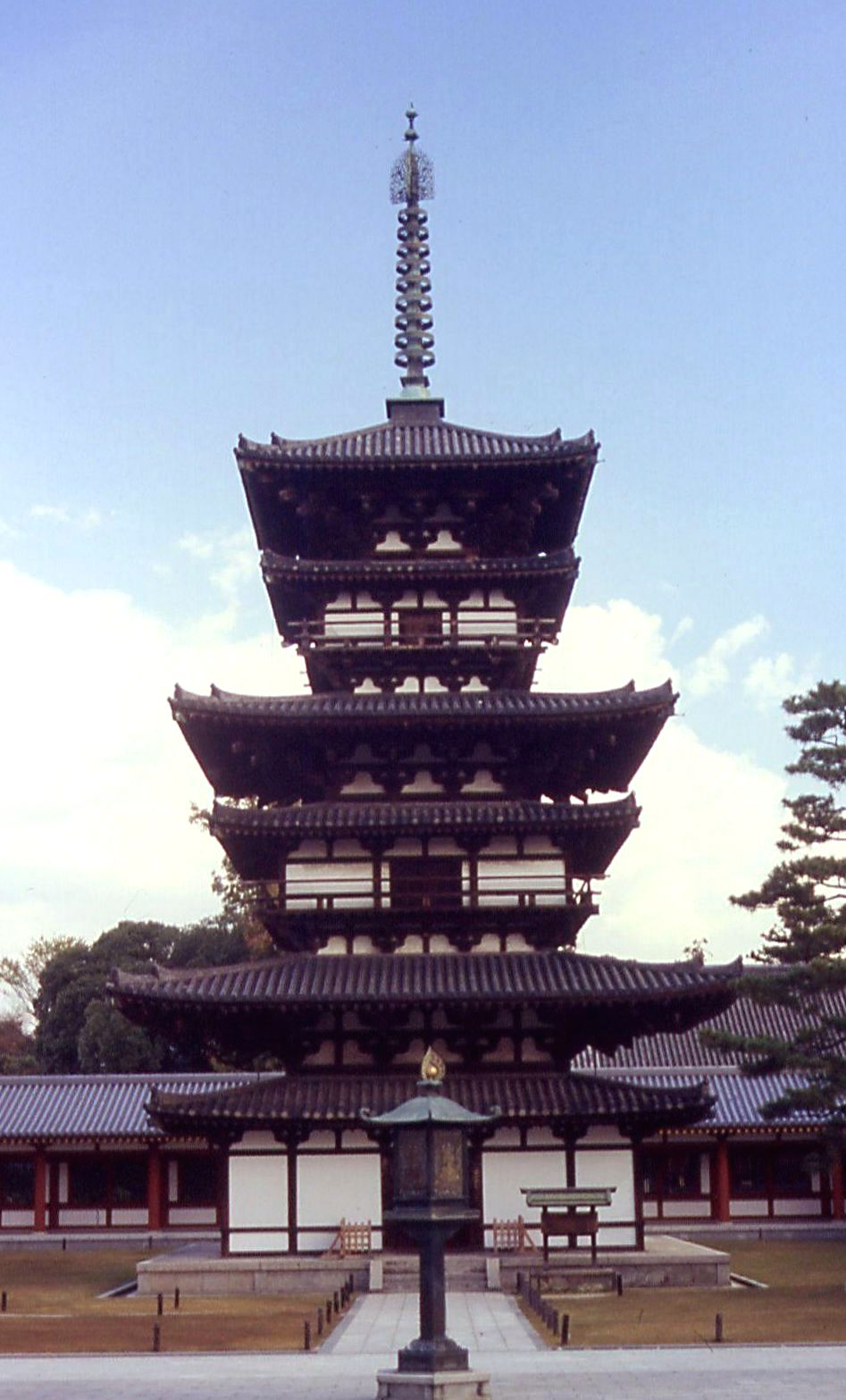
The East Pagoda of Yakushi-ji temple was built in 730, during the Nara period

Seated Bhaisajyaguru

Some of Japan's literary monuments were written during the Nara period, including the Kojiki and Nihon Shoki, the first national histories, compiled in 712 and 720 respectively; the Man'yōshū, an anthology of poems; and the Kaifūsō, an anthology written in kanji by Japanese emperors and princes.

Another major cultural development of the era was the permanent establishment of Buddhism. Buddhism was introduced by Baekje in the sixth century but had a mixed reception until the Nara period, when it was heartily embraced by Emperor Shōmu. Shōmu and his Fujiwara consort were fervent Buddhists and actively promoted the spread of Buddhism, making it the "guardian of the state" and a way of strengthening Japanese institutions.

During Shōmu's reign, the Tōdai-ji (literally Eastern Great Temple) was built. Within it was placed the Great Buddha Daibutsu: a 16-metre-high, gilt-bronze statue. This Buddha was identified with the Sun Goddess, and a gradual syncretism of Buddhism and Shinto ensued. Shōmu declared himself the "Servant of the Three Treasures" of Buddhism: the Buddha, the law or teachings of Buddhism, and the Buddhist community.

The central government established temples called kokubunji in the provinces. The Tōdai-ji was the kokubunji of Yamato Province (present-day Nara Prefecture).

Although these efforts stopped short of making Buddhism the state religion, Nara Buddhism heightened the status of the imperial family. Buddhist influence at court increased under the two reigns of Shōmu's daughter. As Empress Kōken (r. 749–758) she brought many Buddhist priests into court. Kōken abdicated in 758 on the advice of her cousin, Fujiwara no Nakamaro. When the retired empress came to favor a Buddhist faith healer named Dōkyō, Nakamaro rose up in arms in 764 but was quickly crushed. Kōken charged the ruling emperor with colluding with Nakamaro and had him deposed. Kōken reascended the throne as Empress Shōtoku (r. 764–770).

The empress commissioned the printing of 1 million prayer charms — the Hyakumantō Darani — many examples of which survive. The small scrolls, dating from 770, are among the earliest printed works in the world. Shōtoku had the charms printed to placate the Buddhist clergy. She may even have wanted to make Dōkyō emperor, but she died before she could act. Her actions shocked Nara society and led to the exclusion of women from imperial succession and the removal of Buddhist priests from positions of political authority.

Many of the Japanese artworks and imported treasures from other countries during the era of Emperors Shōmu and Shōtoku are archived in Shōsō-in of Tōdai-ji temple. They are called "Shōsōin treasures" and illustrate the cosmopolitan culture known as Tempyō culture. Imported treasures show the cultural influences of Silk Road areas, including China, Korea, India, and the Islamic empire. Shosoin stores more than 10,000 paper documents, the so-called Shōsōin documents (正倉院文書). These are records written in the reverse side of the sutra or in the wrapping of imported items that survived as a result of reusing wasted official documents. Shōsōin documents contribute greatly to the historical research of Japanese political and social systems of the Nara period, and they even can be used to trace the development of the Japanese writing systems (such as katakana).

The first authentically Japanese gardens were built in the city of Nara at the end of the eighth century. Shorelines and stone settings were naturalistic, different from the heavier, earlier continental mode of constructing pond edges. Two such gardens have been found at excavations; both were used for poetry-writing festivities.

== International relations ==
The Nara court aggressively imported knowledge about the Chinese civilization of its day (the Tang dynasty) by sending diplomatic envoys known as kentōshi to the Tang court every twenty years. Many Japanese students, both lay and Buddhist priests, studied in Chang'an and Luoyang. One student named Abe no Nakamaro passed the Chinese civil examination to be appointed to governmental posts in China. He served as governor-general in Annam (Chinese Vietnam) from 761 through 767. Many students who returned from China, such as Kibi no Makibi, were promoted to high government posts.

Tang China never sent official envoys to Japan, for Japanese kings, or "emperors" as they styled themselves, did not seek investiture from the Chinese emperor. A local Chinese government in the Lower Yangzi Valley sent a mission to Japan to return Japanese envoys who entered China through Balhae. The Chinese local mission could not return home due to the An Lushan Rebellion and remained in Japan.

The Hayato people (隼人) in southern Kyushu frequently resisted rule by the imperial dynasty during the Nara period. They are believed to be of Austronesian origin and had a unique culture that was different from the Japanese people. They were eventually subjugated by the Ritsuryō.

Relations with the Korean kingdom of Silla were initially peaceful, with regular diplomatic exchanges. The rise of Balhae north of Silla destabilized Japan-Silla relations. Balhae sent its first mission in 728 to Nara, which welcomed them as the successor state to Goguryeo, with which Japan had been allied until Silla unified the Three Kingdoms of Korea.

== Events ==
- 710: Japan's capital is moved from Fujiwara-kyō to Heijō-kyō, modeled after China's capital Chang'an.
- 712: The collection of tales called the Kojiki is published.
- 717: The Hōshi Ryokan is founded, and it survives to become Japan's (and the world's) second oldest known hotel in 2012. (The oldest was founded in 705.)
- 720: The collection of tales called the Nihon Shoki is published.
- 735–737: A devastating smallpox epidemic spread from Kyushu to eastern Honshu and Nara, killing an estimated one-third of the Japanese population in these areas. The epidemic is said to have led to the construction of several prominent Buddhist structures during this time period as a form of appeasement.
- 743: Emperor Shōmu issues a rescript to build the Daibutsu (Great Buddha), later to be completed and placed in Tōdai-ji, Nara.
- 752: The Great Buddha (Daibutsu) at Tōdai-ji is completed.
- 759: The poetic anthology Man'yōshū is published.
- 784: The emperor moves the capital to Nagaoka.
- 788: The Buddhist monk Saichō founds the monastery of Mt Hiei, near Kyoto, which becomes a vast ensemble of Buddhist temples.

== See also ==
- Fujiwara no Hirotsugu rebellion
- Takahashi Ujibumi

Preceded by Asuka period	History of Japan	Succeeded by Heian period
