= Demographic history of Japan before the Meiji Restoration =

Demographic features of the population of Japan before the Meiji Restoration include aspects of nationality, religion, and ethnicity.

== Population before Edo era ==
=== Total population ===
Before the establishment of the religious and population investigation registers system by the Tokugawa shogunate, several less reliable sources existed upon which an estimate of the population was made. The first record of the population was the Chinese text "Records of Three Kingdoms" where the summated number of houses in eight countries of Wō is given as 159,000.

The household registration system (Hukou (simplified Chinese: 户口; traditional Chinese: 戶口; pinyin: hùkǒu) or Huji (simplified Chinese: 户籍; traditional Chinese: 戶籍; pinyin: hùjí)), which is called koseki (戸籍, family registries) in Japanese, was introduced from ancient China to Japan during the 7th century. According to "Nihon Shoki (日本書記)", the first koseki system, called Kōgo no Nen Jaku (庚午年籍) or Kōin no Nen Jaku (庚寅年籍), was established between 670 or 690, and was to be readministered every six years. However, most of the original koseki texts were lost because they were to be preserved only 30 years. The oldest koseki fragments - which were reused as reinforcement papers (Shihai Monjo (紙背文書, scroop document)) in Shōsōin (正倉院) - records names, ages and estates of people including slaves (e.g. 1,119 persons were recorded for the village named Hanyū (半布里) (present day Tomika-chō (富加町)) in 702)). A discarded lacquer-coated paper document (Urushigami Monjo (漆紙文書, lacquer paper document)) found in Kanoko C Ruins (鹿ノ子C遺跡), Ishioka, Ibaraki records the total population of families of taxpayers in Hitachi no kuni (常陸国) in 795 was 191,660 (excluding families of officers, families of workers for Shintō shrines and slaves); this is the only reliable remaining census recorded for a whole province before the Edo period. The ancient koseki system later collapsed during the early Heian period, when aristocrats achieved power as landowners of Shōen.

The following estimates by different scholars are based upon the number of houses, villages, kokudaka, areas of rice fields and soldiers which were recorded in "Wamyō Ruijushō (和名類聚抄)" (10th century), "Record of Song or History of Song (Chinese: 宋史; pinyin: Sòng Shǐ)", "Shūgaishō (拾芥抄)" (14th century), "Tenshōki (天正記)" (late 16th century), "Tōdaiki (当代記)" (early 17th century), or fragments of papers of the Shōsōin (8th century) and others, as well as remnants of specific periods.

Estimated population of Japan before Edo period.
Year	Estimated Population by McEvedy & Jones (1978)	Estimated Population by Kitō (1996)	Estimated Population by Biraben (2005)	Estimated Population by Farris (2006)
6100 BC		20,100		
3200 BC		105,500		
2300 BC		261,300		
1300 BC		160,300		
900 BC		75,800		
400 BC			100,000	
200 BC	100,000		200,000	
1 AD	300,000		300,000	
200	700,000	594,900	500,000	
400	1,500,000		1,500,000	
500			2,000,000	
600	3,000,000		4,000,000	
700			5,000,000	
715		4,512,200		
730				5,800,000– 6,400,000
800	4,000,000	5,506,200	6,000,000	
900		6,441,400	7,000,000	
950				4,400,000– 5,600,000
1000	4,500,000		7,000,000	
1100	5,750,000		7,000,000	
1150		6,836,900		5,500,000– 6,300,000
1200	7,500,000		6,000,000	
1250			6,000,000	
1280				5,700,000– 6,200,000
1300	9,750,000		7,000,000	
1340			7,000,000	
1400	12,500,000		8,000,000	
1450				9,600,000– 10,500,000
1500	17,000,000		8,000,000	
1600	22,000,000	12,273,000	12,000,000	15,000,000– 17,000,000
1650	25,000,000	17,497,900		
1700	29,000,000	28,287,200	28,000,000	

=== Urban population ===
Since Kyōto (or Heian-kyō) became the capital of Japan in 794, it has been one of the most important cities in Japan. Hiraizumi and Kamakura flourished under Northern Fujiwara clans (during 12th century) and Kamakura shogunate (1192 to 1333), respectively. The urban area of Kyōto suffered from the Ōnin War (1467 to 1477) and split into two districts, but coalesced into a great city of more than 400,000 inhabitants after the end of Sengoku period. The Christian missionaries led by Francis Xavier reported that the number of houses in Kyōto, Yamaguchi or Hakata was more than 90,000, more than 10,000 or 10,000, respectively, in the late 16th century according to History of Japan written by Luís Fróis. After the unification of Japan by Toyotomi Hideyoshi, Ōsaka grew into a populous city with tens of thousands of people. Several castle towns also began to grow, where samurai classes were settled.

Estimated population of urbans before Edo era (Chandler, 1987).
Year	Asuka	Heijō-kyō (Nara)	Heian-kyō (Kyōto)	Hiraizumi	Hakata	Kamakura	Yamaguchi	Sakai	Ōsaka	Sumpu (Shizuoka)	Edo (Tōkyō)	Kanazawa
622	50,000– 60,000											
750		100,000										
800			200,000									
900			200,000									
925			200,000									
1000			175,000									
1100			175,000									
1150			150,000	50,000-100‚000	9,000							
1200			100,000			175,000						
1250			70,000			200,000						
1300			40,000			200,000						
1350		8,000	150,000									
1400			150,000				40,000					
1450		8,000	150,000		(1471); 50,000		35,000					
1500			40,000		30,000		35,000	30,000	25,000– 26,000			
1550		10,000	100,000		(1570); 17,000		60,000	60,000	(1562); 10,000	(1530); 10,000		
1575			300,000		(1579); 35,000		90,000	75,000	(1583); 100,000			
1600			300,000		50,000		80,000	(1582); 82,000	280,000	100,000	60,000	50,000

== Population during the Edo and early Meiji eras (1600 to 1873) ==
=== Total population ===
After the Shimabara Rebellion, several daimyōs adopted certification systems where all the individuals were to be registered to temples and shrines to avoid Christianity. The Danka system (or terauke seido (寺請制度, temple-certification system)) was officially set by Tokugawa shogunate in 1664, and demographic data of individuals registered to temples and shrines (Shūmon Ninbetsu Aratame Chō) were recorded. After decades, Tokugawa Yoshimune decided to survey the total population of Japan and ordered to collect demographic data of all the domains (han (藩)) and shogunate territories (tenryō (天領)). The first census was surveyed every six years since 1721 and finished in 1846, because the confusion after the Perry Expedition and death of Tokugawa Ieyoshi in 1853 postponed the calculation process of the demographic data collected in 1852, according to Suijin Roku (吹塵録) edited by Katsu Kaishū (勝海舟).

Some of population censuses during Edo era remain recorded in diaries or official texts as below. The population of samurai class and their servants as well as imperial families and noblemen was officially excluded from the census. In addition, the demographic data were summarized by individual domains according to their rules, where babies and children, Buddhist monks, nuns and Shintō priests, discriminated classes of eta and hinin were sometimes excluded from the total population. Unregistered people were also excluded.

In 1732, Tokugawa Yoshimune also ordered nine big Tozama daimyōs whose Domains were not changed since 1664 to report earlier population growths in their Domains. Here, population of Morioka Domain increased from 245,635 in 1669 to 322,109 in 1732; population of Tokushima Domain increased from 308,880 in 1665 to 470,512 in 1732; population of Tsu Domain increased from 252,061 in 1665 to 287,242 in 1732; population of Okayama Domain increased from 185,043 in 1686 to 396,469 in 1732; population of Kagoshima Domain increased from 260,961 in 1698 to 339,955 in 1732; population of Sendai Domain increased from 599,241 in 1690 to 647,427 in 1732; population of Tsuruoka Domain increased from 126,383 in 1694 to 131,164 in 1732; population of Kaga Domain increased from 551,754 in 1720 to 576,734 in 1732; while population of Nihonmatsu Domain only decreased from 73,351 in 1685 to 70,614 in 1732, according to the records written in "Chikkyō Yohitsu Besshū", which supports the rapid population growth in the early Edo era.

Historical demographics of Japan compiled by Tokugawa Shogunate and Meiji Government.
Year in Gregorian calendar	Year in Japanese calendar	No. of Bakufu Census	Total	Male	Female	Sources	Estimated Population (17% added) by Biraben (1993)	Estimated Population (20% added) by Kito (1996)
1721	Kyōhō 6	1st	26,065,422			Sanka Manroku (三暇謾録), Chikkyō Yohitsu Besshū (竹橋余筆別集) (written by Ōta Nanpo (大田南畝))	30,496,900	31,278,500
1726	Kyōhō 11	2nd	26,548,998			Chikkyō Yohitsu Besshū, Suijin Roku	31,104,400	
1732	Kyōhō 17	3rd	26,921,816	14,407,107	12,514,709	Kinotomi Zakki (乙巳雑記) (written by Mukaiyama Seisai (向山誠斎)), Chikkyō Yohitsu Besshū, Suijin Roku	31,498,500	
1744	Enkyō 3	5th	26,153,450			Kanchū Hisaku (官中秘策) (written by Nishiyama Genbun (西山元文))	30,599,500	
1750	Kan'en 3	6th	25,917,830	13,818,654	12,099,176	Kanchū Hisaku, Suijin Roku	30,323,900	31,010,800
1756	Hōreki 6	7th	26,061,830	13,833,311	12,228,519	Koku Shi (国史) (written by Shibui Taishitsu (渋井大室)); Kanchū Hisaku, Suijin Roku	30,502,700	31,282,500
1762	Hōreki 12	8th	25,921,458	13,785,400	12,136,058	Suijin Roku	30,328,100	
1768	Meiwa 5	9th	26,252,057			Suijin Roku	30,714,900	
1774	An'ei 3	10th	25,990,451			Suijin Roku	30,408,800	
1780	An'ei 9	11th	26,010,600			Suijin Roku	30,432,400	
1786	Tenmei 6	12th	25,086,466	13,230,656	11,855,810	Suijin Roku, Tenmei Kansei Ninzū Chō (天明寛政人数帳); Suijin Roku	29,351,200	30,103,800
1792	Kansei 4	13th	24,891,441	13,034,521	11,856,920	Zassai (雑載) Vol. 25, Kasshi Yawa (甲子夜話) Vol. 87 (written by Matsura Seizan (松浦静山)), Suijin Roku	29,123,000	29,869,700
1798	Kansei 10	14th	25,471,033	13,360,520	12,110,513	Zassai, Kasshi Yawa Vol. 87, Suijin Roku, Kansei Jū-nen Oyobi Bunsei Go-nen Kunibetsu Ninzū Chō (寛政十年及文政五年国別人数帳)	29,801,100	30,565,200
1804	Bunka 1	15th	25,621,957	13,427,249	12,194,708	Suijin Roku, Tenmei Kansei Ninzū Chō (天明寛政人数帳)	29,977,690	30,746,400
1822	Bunsei 5	18th	26,602,110	13,894,436	12,707,674	Tokugawa Rizai Kaiyō (徳川理財会要), Kansei Jū-nen Oyobi Bunsei Go-nen Kunibetsu Ninzū Chō	31,124,500	31,913,500
1828	Bunsei 11	19th	27,201,400	14,160,736	13,040,664	Bunkyōkō Jitsuroku (文恭公実録), Tokugawa Rizai Kaiyō, Taihei Nenpyō (泰平年表)	31,825,600	32,625,800
1834	Tenpo 5	20th	27,063,907	14,053,455	13,010,452	Tenpō Go Umanotoshi Shokoku Ninzū (天保五午年諸国人数)	31,664,800	32,476,700
1840	Tenpo 11	21st	25,918,412	13,359,384	12,559,028	Tenpō Jūichi Nenotoshi Kōgō Shokoku Ninzū-Chō (天保十一子年諸国人数帳)		31,102,100
1846	Kōka 3	22nd	26,907,625	13,854,043	13,053,582	Suijin Roku	31,481,900	32,297,200
Jul 28, 1870	7th month, 1st day Meiji 3		32,794,897	16,733,698	16,061,199	Kōgo-nen Gaisan (庚午年概算) (Total Koseki Population)	34,620,000	
Mar 8, 1872	1st month, 29th day Meiji 5		33,110,825	16,796,158	16,314,667	Nihon Zenkoku Koseki hyō (日本全国戸籍表) (Total Koseki Population)	34,883,000	34,806,000
Jan 1, 1873	Jan 1, Meiji 6		33,300,644	16,891,715	16,408,929	Nihon Zenkoku Koseki hyō (Total Koseki Population)	35,069,000	34,985,000

=== Total Fertility Rate from 1800 to 1873 ===
The total fertility rate is the number of children born per woman. It is based on approximated and fairly good data for the entire period. Sources: Our World In Data and Gapminder Foundation.

Years	1800	1801	1802	1803	1804	1805	1806	1807	1808	1809	1810
Total Fertility Rate in Japan	4.08	4.11	4.14	4.17	4.2	4.23	4.25	4.28	4.31	4.34	4.37

Years	1811	1812	1813	1814	1815	1816	1817	1818	1819	1820
Total Fertility Rate in Japan	4.4	4.43	4.43	4.44	4.44	4.45	4.45	4.45	4.46	4.46

Years	1821	1822	1823	1824	1825	1826	1827	1828	1829	1830
Total Fertility Rate in Japan	4.47	4.47	4.48	4.48	4.48	4.49	4.49	4.5	4.5	4.51

Years	1831	1832	1833	1834	1835	1836	1837	1838	1839	1840
Total Fertility Rate in Japan	4.51	4.51	4.52	4.52	4.53	4.53	4.54	4.54	4.55	4.56

Years	1841	1842	1843	1844	1845	1846	1847	1848	1849	1850
Total Fertility Rate in Japan	4.58	4.59	4.6	4.61	4.62	4.64	4.65	4.66	4.67	4.68

Years	1851	1852	1853	1854	1855	1856	1857	1858	1859	1860
Total Fertility Rate in Japan	4.7	4.71	4.72	4.73	4.74	4.76	4.77	4.78	4.79	4.8

Years	1861	1862	1863	1864	1865	1866	1867	1868	1869	1870	1871	1872	1873
Total Fertility Rate in Japan	4.82	4.83	4.84	4.7	4.55	4.41	4.27	4.13	3.98	3.7	3.7	3.56	3.41

=== Regional population ===
==== Former provinces ====
Some demographic data for former provinces or kuni (国) remain recorded. Similarly to the total population, recorded provincial population excludes ruling and exceptional classes, while that in 1873 (after Meiji Restoration) includes all the registered people.

Provincial demographics of Japan compiled by Tokugawa Shogunate and Meiji Government.
Province	Japanese	1721	1750	1756	1786	1792	1798	1804	1822	1828	1834	1840	1846	1873 (all classes)	Area (hōri)	Area (km^{2})	Number of Counties in 1834	Number of Villages in 1834	Cereal production (Koku) in 1834
Kinai	畿内	2,249,792	2,139,480	2,170,087	2,041,309	2,027,334	2,048,799	2,017,308	2,074,967	2,099,644	2,077,269	1,935,301	1,998,736	2,036,842	445.59	6,872.54	55	3,651	1,615,527.199925
Yamashiro no kuni	山城国	564,994	522,626	527,334	507,488	506,324	480,993	469,517	478,652	498,296	488,726	445,432	452,140	431,453	73.08	1,127.15	8	477	230,131.760865
Yamato no kuni	大和国	413,331	374,041	367,724	336,254	329,286	344,043	340,706	346,319	356,627	360,071	338,571	361,157	423,004	201.42	3,106.60	15	1,354	501,361.691560
Kawachi no kuni	河内国	243,820	231,266	206,568	205,585	209,296	218,102	214,945	244,816	223,747	224,822	211,559	224,055	239,191	43.99	678.48	16	545	293,786.634500
Izumi no kuni	和泉国	218,405	207,952	226,480	190,762	190,466	199,083	202,283	205,545	208,884	207,211	189,786	197,656	212,251	33.47	516.22	4	320	172,847.986000
Settsu no kuni	摂津国	809,242	803,595	841,981	801,220	791,962	806,578	789,857	799,635	812,090	796,439	749,953	763,728	730,943	93.63	1,444.10	12	955	417,399.127000
Tōkaidō	東海道	6,612,785	6,605,014	6,522,189	6,031,917	5,864,119	6,061,401	6,032,987	6,182,091	6,384,212	6,169,363	6,192,155	6,425,259	7,451,669	2,660.63	41,036.15	129	15,323	6,652,134.556760
Iga no kuni	伊賀国	95,978	91,392	88,526	82,352	79,648	80,647	80,196	85,636	87,949	89,243	88,616	91,774	97,190	47.34	730.15	14	182	110,096.536000
Ise no kuni	伊勢国	543,737	523,037	519,187	478,906	462,682	477,899	476,500	494,640	498,171	499,958	480,032	499,874	581,669	231.15	3,565.14	13	1,325	716,451.492700
Shima no kuni	志摩国	31,856	34,068	34,261	37,184	36,888	38,617	37,875	40,401	40,919	41,888	39,210	40,693	46,943	19.74	304.46	2	56	21,470.398000
Owari no kuni	尾張国	554,561	553,340	576,363	595,264	582,183	605,084	605,686	631,809	646,555	643,977	622,539	653,678	731,974	104.18	1,606.82	8	1,008	545,875.793000
Mikawa no kuni	三河国	416,204	419,283	425,745	419,349	360,795	423,893	420,697	437,019	439,635	440,264	421,432	431,800	485,470	208.62	3,217.64	8	1,292	466,080.746800
Tōtōmi no kuni	遠江国	342,663	333,744	341,724	332,100	334,246	352,033	342,398	386,581	361,236	360,818	350,967	363,959	416,543	196.44	3,029.79	12	1,094	369,552.575180
Suruga no kuni	駿河国	245,834	313,817	250,582	242,165	242,457	248,127	252,072	288,824	277,763	253,848	274,705	286,290	369,731	219.77	3,389.62	7	780	250,538.753090
Kai no kuni	甲斐国	291,168	314,193	317,349	305,934	284,474	309,604	297,903	291,675	391,499	318,474	300,152	310,273	362,973	289.85	4,470.49	4	769	312,159.329490
Izu no kuni	伊豆国	96,650	105,120	105,272	120,629	98,226	102,551	125,505	134,722	136,796	144,595	110,523	115,197	150,549	106.11	1,636.58	4	284	84,171.293620
Sagami no kuni	相模国	312,638	310,796	305,569	279,427	277,699	277,211	278,068	269,839	289,376	294,009	285,196	303,271	359,598	128.87	1,987.62	9	671	286,719.756890
Musashi no kuni	武蔵国	1,903,316	1,771,214	1,774,064	1,626,968	1,634,048	1,666,131	1,654,368	1,694,255	1,717,455	1,714,054	1,721,359	1,777,371	1,968,753	391.63	6,040.29	22	3,042	1,281,431.068820
Awa no kuni	安房国	115,579	158,440	137,565	125,052	130,836	133,513	132,993	139,662	140,830	144,581	139,442	143,500	155,331	34.86	537.66	4	280	95,736.239070
Kazusa no kuni	上総国	407,553	453,460	438,788	388,542	376,441	368,831	364,560	372,347	362,411	364,240	358,714	360,761	423,596	140.69	2,169.93	9	1,194	425,080.453410
Shimōsa no kuni	下総国	542,661	567,603	565,614	483,526	468,413	484,641	478,721	419,106	497,758	402,093	499,507	525,041	648,394	206.50	3,184.95	12	1,623	681,062.631660
Hitachi no kuni	常陸国	712,387	655,507	641,580	514,519	495,083	492,619	485,445	495,575	495,859	457,321	499,761	521,777	652,955	334.88	5,165.01	11	1,723	1,005,707.489030
Tōsandō	東山道	5,879,324	5,680,006	5,659,556	5,267,640	5,204,842	5,294,135	5,303,859	5,435,750	5,511,868	5,446,583	5,089,068	5,328,995	6,785,623	6,847.50	105,612.22	132	14,691	7,954,049.255308
Ōmi no kuni	近江国	602,367	575,216	573,797	583,940	573,617	538,442	532,968	557,491	547,724	511,948	527,412	541,732	578,099	257.15	3,966.15	12	1,516	853,095.305590
Mino no kuni	美濃国	545,919	533,091	543,510	556,165	536,904	563,863	566,355	598,580	609,459	607,269	570,807	583,137	668,148	402.87	6,213.65	21	1,602	699,764.321660
Hida no kuni	飛騨国	67,032	72,323	74,907	77,939	76,401	79,393	81,768	89,818	91,382	93,765	82,967	86,338	98,822	268.58	4,142.44	3	414	56,602.309000
Shinano no kuni	信濃国	693,947	686,651	706,974	723,295	714,199	742,791	748,142	778,025	797,099	808,073	775,313	794,698	924,867	853.76	13,167.94	10	1,615	767,788.077600
Kōzuke no kuni	上野国	569,550	576,075	579,987	522,869	513,915	514,172	497,034	456,950	464,226	451,830	426,073	428,092	509,941	407.25	6,281.21	14	1,217	637,331.633100
Shimotsuke no kuni	下野国	560,020	554,261	535,743	434,791	404,818	413,337	404,495	395,045	375,957	342,260	367,654	378,665	501,849	411.77	6,350.92	9	1,365	769,905.027038
Mutsu no kuni	陸奥国	1,962,839	1,836,134	1,806,192	1,563,719	1,568,218	1,589,178	1,602,948	1,650,629	1,680,102	1,690,509	1,506,193	1,603,881	2,305,961	2,956.76	45,603.50	51	4,519	2,874,239.059880
Iwaki no kuni	磐城国													349,594	429.83	6,629.47	14	963	613,924.675660
Iwashiro no kuni	岩代国													430,163	497.52	7,673.49	9	1,305	755,703.961220
Rikuzen no kuni	陸前国													539,614	525.92	8,111.51	14	702	697,838.180000
Rikuchū no kuni	陸中国													513,273	830.98	12,816.60	10	537	423,134.490000
Mutsu no kuni	陸奥国													473,317	672.51	10,372.44	4	1,012	383,637.753000
Dewa no kuni	出羽国	877,650	846,255	838,446	804,922	816,770	852,959	870,149	909,212	945,919	940,929	832,649	912,452	1,197,936	1,289.36	19,886.41	12	2,443	1,295,323.521440
Uzen no kuni	羽前国													567,361	546.64	8,431.09	4	1,204	804,569.693740
Ugo no kuni	羽後国													630,575	742.72	11,455.32	8	1,239	490,753.827700
Hokurikudō	北陸道	2,155,663	2,160,541	2,212,937	2,108,387	2,190,010	2,269,348	2,307,745	2,511,390	2,598,219	2,640,844	2,401,206	2,534,477	3,309,335	1,633.01	25,186.68	33	8,910	3,622,488.969650
Wakasa no kuni	若狭国	86,598	78,072	77,729	79,323	76,124	78,356	78,715	83,056	84,678	84,366	83,956	77,183	85,813	54.75	844.44	3	255	91,018.822200
Echizen no kuni	越前国	367,652	348,052	344,830	332,019	335,813	350,833	354,038	375,572	386,071	397,823	328,217	353,674	454,229	217.67	3,357.23	8	1,533	689,304.819870
Kaga no kuni	加賀国	206,933	202,429	160,778	196,732	189,682	192,738	196,725	220,004	220,267	230,461	223,338	238,291	405,268	147.83	2,280.05	4	768	483,665.848700
Noto no kuni	能登国	152,113	157,765	212,048	137,427	159,436	165,188	167,534	193,569	198,111	197,704	179,431	186,970	264,379	122.72	1,892.77	4	666	275,369.990210
Etchū no kuni	越中国	314,158	313,562	313,710	317,265	327,327	337,129	345,419	383,265	413,888	402,411	383,583	403,121	623,977	266.41	4,108.97	4	1,376	808,008.461820
Echigo no kuni	越後国	932,461	970,185	1,013,331	954,524	1,011,067	1,053,674	1,072,904	1,154,052	1,191,935	1,224,947	1,099,980	1,172,973	1,372,116	767.29	11,834.28	7	4,051	1,142,555.535850
Sado no kuni	佐渡国	95,748	90,476	90,511	91,097	90,561	91,430	92,410	101,872	103,269	103,132	102,701	102,265	103,553	56.34	868.96	3	261	132,565.491000
San'indō	山陰道	1,263,340	1,306,567	1,340,875	1,368,649	1,362,540	1,427,610	1,441,698	1,519,467	1,544,033	1,569,651	1,430,878	1,487,122	1,634,188	1,109.83	17,117.43	53	4,214	1,499,296.436760
Tanba no kuni	丹波国	284,893	276,336	282,018	281,356	275,038	281,234	282,493	290,243	291,869	292,808	276,117	280,947	295,681	206.67	3,187.57	6	880	324,136.268670
Tango no kuni	丹後国	125,276	134,476	135,392	141,191	141,364	146,762	147,403	154,763	157,401	159,211	149,063	154,308	162,084	77.10	1,189.15	5	388	147,614.804460
Tajima no kuni	但馬国	149,732	156,612	154,980	158,455	160,030	164,764	167,549	179,408	181,052	184,323	162,243	173,573	187,980	165.92	2,559.06	8	623	144,313.084030
Inaba no kuni	因幡国	122,030	125,085	125,091	123,622	123,532	126,695	128,643	132,670	135,969	136,204	120,879	127,797	162,920	98.59	1,520.60	8	553	177,844.624000
Hōki no kuni	伯耆国	132,981	140,719	144,552	155,289	155,532	166,449	169,570	180,730	186,813	191,175	168,310	177,420	194,525	125.57	1,936.73	6	754	217,990.822280
Izumo no kuni	出雲国	222,330	234,896	220,094	258,916	260,189	271,667	279,177	299,708	308,346	315,270	302,837	309,906	340,222	181.61	2,801.06	10	504	302,627.465000
Iwami no kuni	石見国	207,965	219,512	259,202	229,113	225,783	248,076	245,203	257,508	257,349	264,948	225,657	236,963	262,035	232.32	3,583.18	6	451	172,209.768320
Oki no kuni	隠岐国	18,133	18,931	19,546	20,707	21,072	21,963	21,660	24,437	25,234	25,712	25,772	26,208	28,741	22.05	340.09	4	61	12,559.600000
San'yōdō	山陽道	2,657,695	2,634,975	2,702,284	2,747,716	2,733,792	2,823,445	2,822,910	2,960,990	3,038,751	3,065,355	2,915,809	3,028,359	3,550,654	1,571.35	24,235.67	81	4,813	3,211,546.810710
Harima no kuni	播磨国	633,725	551,393	627,943	607,758	602,410	608,890	599,401	609,246	613,534	600,731	581,713	594,560	639,576	238.58	3,679.73	16	1,796	651,964.813500
Mimasaka no kuni	美作国	194,226	175,168	173,421	157,747	132,445	157,066	153,397	159,007	159,850	164,018	156,196	165,468	215,676	170.56	2,630.63	12	628	262,099.098000
Bizen no kuni	備前国	338,523	322,982	325,550	321,627	316,881	321,221	318,273	318,203	318,771	318,647	304,229	310,576	333,714	94.25	1,453.66	8	673	416,581.854000
Bitchū no kuni	備中国	333,731	365,410	325,531	316,904	316,735	327,100	328,408	337,155	343,792	347,415	335,494	346,927	399,218	156.50	2,413.77	11	484	363,915.614210
Bingo no kuni	備後国	321,008	306,818	310,989	303,731	307,029	315,363	318,577	342,184	351,597	360,656	344,919	360,832	459,109	234.03	3,609.55	14	494	312,054.932000
Aki no kuni	安芸国	361,431	396,878	414,209	454,112	466,261	491,278	499,081	547,296	564,271	578,516	527,849	553,708	673,301	286.72	4,422.22	8	436	310,648.489000
Suō no kuni	周防国	262,927	289,392	291,334	344,800	351,110	357,507	358,761	397,836	429,329	436,198	413,630	435,188	498,732	189.20	2,918.12	6	152	489,428.677000
Nagato no kuni	長門国	212,124	226,934	233,307	241,037	240,921	245,020	247,012	250,063	257,607	259,171	251,779	261,100	331,328	201.51	3,107.98	6	150	404,853.333000
Nankaidō	南海道	2,156,379	2,204,070	2,227,504	2,268,283	2,240,675	2,280,438	2,350,336	2,490,692	2,537,174	2,577,251	2,491,662	2,565,745	3,244,966	1,599.32	24,667.07	51	4,451	1,889,261.906450
Kii no kuni	紀伊国	519,022	508,674	512,898	500,621	478,499	473,609	477,361	508,112	516,478	520,902	489,036	499,826	620,241	381.17	5,878.96	7	1,337	440,858.377710
Awaji no kuni	淡路国	105,226	107,113	107,120	106,161	104,352	104,269	112,449	119,327	123,748	123,500	119,147	122,773	165,485	36.73	566.50	2	251	97,164.784000
Awa no kuni	阿波国	342,386	362,905	363,254	369,280	368,536	375,358	425,304	446,291	454,120	459,244	431,050	448,287	590,048	271.13	4,181.77	10	455	268,894.329000
Sanuki no kuni	讃岐国	334,153	357,326	362,874	384,851	386,062	396,122	395,980	409,815	422,508	432,648	419,969	433,880	564,351	113.74	1,754.27	11	377	291,320.256400
Iyo no kuni	伊予国	504,045	499,860	508,592	514,773	516,186	531,378	529,829	563,669	574,847	585,651	580,589	599,948	778,556	341.56	5,268.04	14	955	460,997.639340
Tosa no kuni	土佐国	351,547	368,192	372,766	392,597	387,040	399,702	409,413	443,478	445,473	455,306	451,871	461,031	526,285	454.99	7,017.53	7	1,076	330,026.520000
Saikaidō	西海道	3,074,829	3,165,370	3,203,636	3,226,255	3,240,720	3,237,146	3,299,697	3,366,302	3,422,274	3,449,732	3,397,987	3,468,045	5,163,730	2,831	43,661	96	7,509	4,114,612.705576
Chikuzen no kuni	筑前国	302,160	307,439	306,173	307,778	304,199	307,982	313,420	321,857	329,886	335,803	339,434	346,942	445,278	158.63	2,446.63	15	901	651,782.278440
Chikugo no kuni	筑後国	266,426	260,875	263,176	270,448	273,293	272,239	277,579	284,169	292,913	307,206	295,678	299,041	393,656	80.87	1,247.30	10	710	375,588.897800
Buzen no kuni	豊前国	248,187	242,653	254,195	237,537	236,331	234,342	235,950	239,269	243,949	247,176	240,798	249,274	307,535	136.63	2,107.31	8	677	368,913.640500
Bungo no kuni	豊後国	524,394	511,880	511,706	469,687	468,200	464,722	466,106	474,016	474,540	475,985	457,229	470,875	565,460	344.11	5,307.37	8	1,473	417,514.227150
Hizen no kuni	肥前国	609,926	632,923	647,831	662,342	678,029	674,272	712,654	683,536	701,527	699,154	692,334	713,593	1,082,488	319.80	4,932.43	11	1,400	706,470.723196
Higo no kuni	肥後国	614,007	620,244	621,294	646,892	656,035	663,414	671,316	720,216	738,078	743,544	741,677	755,781	950,389	489.29	7,546.55	14	1,116	611,920.291100
Hyūga no kuni	日向国	211,614	225,421	225,713	230,133	228,691	229,624	230,783	241,310	243,412	245,476	249,955	247,621	382,564	511.40	7,887.56	5	483	340,128.861790
Ōsumi no kuni	大隅国	112,616	131,623	132,787	126,022	121,031	116,167	114,166	107,603	104,218	103,096	97,228	99,212	220,578	247.36	3,815.15	8	230	170,833.451000
Satsuma no kuni	薩摩国	149,039	194,312	205,385	237,889	236,127	235,630	238,493	250,831	251,649	248,364	239,891	241,797	586,324	332.68	5,131.08	13	258	315,005.600120
Iki-shima	壱岐嶋	19,993	23,200	23,404	23,391	24,771	24,968	25,368	26,532	27,624	27,215	27,210	27,005	32,929	8.81	135.88	2	50	32,742.921000
Tsushima-jima	対馬嶋	16,467	14,800	11,972	14,136	14,013	13,786	13,862	16,963	14,478	16,713	16,553	16,904	29,740	44.33	683.72	2	140	0.000000
Ryūkyū-han	琉球藩													166,789	156.91	2,420.10	0	71	123,711.813480
Hokkaidō	北海道	15,615	21,807	22,632	26,310	27,409	28,711	45,417	61,948	65,023	67,862	64,346	70,887	123,668	6,093.93	93,989.55	0	128	0.000000
Ezo chi–Matsumae han	蝦夷地松前藩	15,615	21,807	22,632	26,310	27,409	28,711	45,417	61,948	65,023	67,862	64,346	70,887	123,668	6,093.93	93,989.55	0	128	0.000000
Ishikari no kuni	石狩国													6,003					
Shiribeshi no kuni	後志国													19,098					
Iburi no kuni	胆振国													6,251					
Oshima no kuni	渡島国													75,830					
Hidaka no kuni	日高国													6,574					
Tokachi no kuni	十勝国													1,464					
Kushiro no kuni	釧路国													1,734					
Nemuro no kuni	根室国													832					
Chishima no kuni	千島国													437					
Kitami no kuni	北見国													1,511					
Teshio no kuni	天塩国													1,576					
Karafuto Kaitaku-shi	樺太開拓使													2,358					
Total		26,065,422	25,917,830	26,061,700	25,086,466	24,891,441	25,471,033	25,621,957	26,603,597	27,201,198	27,063,907	25,918,412	26,907,625	33,300,675	24,791.98	382,378.39	630	63,690	30,558,917.841139
General total		26,065,422	25,917,830	26,061,830	25,086,466	24,891,441	25,471,033	25,621,957	26,602,110	27,201,400	27,063,907	25,918,412	26,907,625	33,300,675	24,796.63	382,450.11	630	63,690	30,558,917.841139

After the beginning of the Tokugawa census, population growth fell almost to zero until the end of the Sakoku policy. On the other hand, regional demographic data suggest that population growth differed depending on area; the population of Tōhoku region (Mutsu and Dewa), especially in Mutsu decreased drastically, probably because of famines. The population of Kansai region (Kinai and its surrounding areas), which was the most densely populated and the most cultivated area of that time, as well as that of Kantō region, also slightly decreased, probably because the surplus population in the rural areas moved to the big cities such as Kyoto, Osaka, and Edo, where the life expectancy at birth were much lower than that in rural areas. On the other hand, populations in most of western Japan including Chūgoku region (San'indō and San'yodō), Shikoku (Nankaidō except for Kii) and Kyūshū (Saikaidō) steadily increased, where growth was sustained by the introduction of New World crops such as sweet potato, pumpkin, or sweetcorn.

==== Ryūkyū, Amami, Ezo and Karafuto ====
The populations of Ryūkyū and Amami Islands were surveyed by the Satsuma Domain, which had formal possession of Satsuma, Ōsumi and part of Hyūga (Morokata-gun (諸県郡)) in southern Kyūshū, and recorded in Satsuma domestic texts, although they were not reported to the Tokugawa shogunate and were thus excluded from the total population of Japan. The populations of Ryūkyū and Amami Islands were included in the total populations of Japan after the Meiji Restoration.

Historical demographics of Ryūkyū and Amami Islands and Satsuma Domain.
Year	Ryūkyū	Amami	mainland			
Year	Ryūkyū	Amami	Satsuma	Ōsumi	Morokata, Hyūga	total
1632	108,958					
1636	111,669				63,723	
1659	112,764					
1665	110,241					
ca. 1670	110,211	31,377	178,101	115,459	60,767	354,327
1672	116,483					
1677	122,213					379,142
1684	129,995		183,376	117,583	54,428	355,387
1690	128,567					
1699	141,187					
1706	155,108	49,472				461,961
1707	155,261					
1713	157,760					
1721	167,672					
1729	173,969					
1761	188,530					
1772	174,211	74,910				638,101
1795						623,627
1800	155,650	74,593	373,046	177,312	76,971	627,329
1826	140,565	77,667	404,774	169,830	76,598	651,202
1852	132,678	85,125	393,527	157,111	74,727	625,365
1871			457,213	191,334	79,087	727,634

The populations recorded in Satsuma domestic texts include all the classes, from several samurai classes to people who were discriminated against.

On the other hand, the populations of Ainu in eastern Ezo (including Chishima (Kuril Islands)) and western Ezo (including Karafuto (Sakhalin)) have been recorded since 1798 and 1810, respectively, and were thus included in the total population of Japan.

Historical demographics of Wajin (和人) (Japanese) and Ainu in Ezo-chi and Matsumae Domain (present Hokkaidō, Sakhalin and Kuril Islands).
Year	Total	Wajin	Ainu				
Year	Total	Wajin	Matsumae-han	Eastern Ezo-chi (incl. Chishima)	Western Ezo-chi (excl. Karfuto)	Northern Ezo-chi (Karafuto)	total
1804	56,461	32,664	526	12,227	8,944	2,100	23,797
ca. 1810	58,540	31,740	450				26,800
1822	61,948	37,138	472	12,119	9,648	2,571	24,810
1839	65,263	41,886	422	12,900	7,449	2,606	23,377
1848			395	10,912	9,320		
1854	82,639	63,834	377	10,506	5,253	2,669	18,805
1873	123,688	105,058	259	12,532	3,481	2,358	18,630

==== Domains (han) and estates of the realm ====
Meiji government tried to unify the registered system of Shūmon Ninbetsu Aratame Chō in consonant with that of each other among domains and prefectures into a single registered system of koseki. However population were still surveyed by domains until the Abolition of the han system in 1871. The total population of Japan on July 28, 1870 (32,773,698) was collected by different systems of domains, but included all the registered people of all classes.

The uniformed system of Jinshin koseki (壬申戸籍) was finally established in 1872, where the discriminated classes of eta and hinin were assimilated into the citizens class (heimin (平民, normal people)), though they kept unofficially called shin-heimin (新平民, new normal people)) and discriminated. The honseki population in 1872 (33,110,825) includes 29 imperial members (kōzoku (皇族, imperial family)), 2,666 noblemen (kazoku (華族, noble family)), 1,282,167 former samurai class members (shizoku (士族, samurai family)), 658,074 and 3,316 lower former samurai class members (sotsuzoku (卒族, soldier family) and chishi (地士, squire), respectively), 211,846 and 9,621 Buddhist monks and nuns (sōryo (僧侶, monk) and ama (尼, nun), respectively), 102,477 former Shintō priests (kyū-shinkan (旧神官, former Shintō priest)), 30,837,271 citizens (heimin, which includes ca. 550,000 shin-heimin and 2,358 unclassified people in Sakhalin.)

=== Urban population ===
After the Battle of Sekigahara, Yamaguchi declined, while Edo (Tōkyō) and Sumpu (Shizuoka) became important under the Tokugawa shogunate. According to Rodrigo de Vivero y Velasco, the populations of Kyōto, Ōsaka, Edo, Sumpu and Sakai were 300,000–400,000 (or 800,000), 200,000, 150,000, 120,000 and 80,000, respectively, while the two towns between Sumpu and Kyōto had 30,000 and 40,000 inhabitants (probably Hamamatsu and Nagoya (or Kiyosu), respectively) in 1609. After the death of Tokugawa Ieyasu, Sumpu became less important, while Edo, Ōsaka and Kyōto became the three most important cities and were called the santo (三都, three capitals) with tens of thousands of inhabitants.

Below is a list of the estimated population of major Japanese urbans during Edo period. Although Hiroshima, Wakayama, Tokushima, Hagi, Takamatsu and Sumpu (Shizuoka) were important castle towns of major domains, estimated populations are not given because of the lack of sufficient demographic records. Population of Shuri, the capital of the Kingdom of Ryūkyū, is also not estimated, while Yokohama was only a small village of less than 100 houses until the opening of the port in 1859.

Estimated population of urbans during Edo period (Saitō, 1984) and recorded population of urbans as of Jan 1, 1873.
Urban	1650	1750	1850	1873	Type
Edo (Tōkyō)	430,000	1,220,000	1,150,000	595,905	de facto capital
Ōsaka	220,000	410,000	330,000	271,992	market town
Kyōto	430,000	370,000	290,000	238,663	de jure capital
Nagoya	87,000	106,000	116,000	125,193	castle town
Kanazawa	114,000	128,000	118,000	109,685	castle town
Kagoshima	50,000	58,000	42,000	89,374	castle town
Hiroshima	n.a.	n.a.	n.a.	74,305	castle town
Yokohama	n.a.	n.a.	n.a.	64,602	fishery village before 1859
Wakayama	n.a.	n.a.	n.a.	61,124	castle town
Sendai	57,000	60,000	48,000	51,998	castle town
Tokushima	n.a.	n.a.	n.a.	48,861	castle town
Hagi	n.a.	n.a.	n.a.	45,318	castle town
Shuri	n.a.	n.a.	n.a.	44,984	capital of Ryūkyū
Toyama	8,000	17,000	33,000	44,682	castle town
Kumamoto	17,000	29,000	41,000	44,620	castle town
Hakata and Fukuoka	53,000	43,000	32,000	41,635	port and castle towns
Hyōgo and Kōbe	20,000	25,000	22,000	40,900	port town and fishery village
Fukui	48,000	43,000	39,000	39,784	castle town
Kōchi	20,000	24,000	28,000	39,757	castle town
Sakai	69,000	47,000	41,000	38,838	port town
Kubota (Akita)	18,000	22,000	27,000	38,118	castle town
Matsue	18,000	28,000	36,000	37,808	castle town
Niigata	4,000	14,000	27,000	33,152	port town
Hirosaki	11,000	31,000	37,000	32,886	castle town
Takamatsu	n.a.	n.a.	n.a.	32,736	castle town
Okayama	29,000	26,000	20,000	32,372	castle town
Sumpu (Shizuoka)	n.a.	n.a.	n.a.	31,555	castle town
Nagasaki	37,000	45,000	31,000	29,656	overseas port town
Hakodate	0	3,000	10,000	28,825	port town
Takada (Jōetsu)	21,000	16,000	18,000	27,460	castle town
Matsuyama	23,000	16,000	16,000	26,141	castle town
Tsuruoka	15,000	18,000	16,000	24,964	castle town
Yonezawa	35,000	32,000	29,000	24,945	castle town
Himeji	21,000	22,000	24,000	24,521	castle town
Hikone	38,000	33,000	29,000	24,368	castle town
Nagaoka	n.a.	n.a.	n.a.	24,067	castle town
Takaoka	12,000	11,000	14,000	23,724	market town
Yamada (Ise)	30,000	23,000	16,000	22,473	Shintō holy town
Fushimi	16,000	33,000	46,000	22,334	riverside port town
Annōtsu (Tsu)	12,000	18,000	16,000	22,080	castle town
Saga	n.a.	n.a.	n.a.	21,660	castle town
Morioka	17,000	27,000	30,000	21,306	castle town
Nara	35,000	35,000	27,000	21,158	Buddhism holy town
Tottori	32,000	35,000	35,000	20,782	castle town
Wakamatsu (Aizu-Wakamatsu)	27,000	26,000	25,000	20,588	castle town
Kurume	n.a.	n.a.	n.a.	20,381	castle town
Obama	n.a.	n.a.	n.a.	19,271	castle town
Mito	n.a.	n.a.	n.a.	19,010	castle town
Shinminato	n.a.	n.a.	n.a.	18,904	port town
Sakata	n.a.	n.a.	n.a.	18,619	port town
Akamazeki	n.a.	n.a.	n.a.	18,500	port town
Kuwana	22,000	19,000	16,000	18,064	castle town
Ōtsu	22,000	19,000	17,000	17,924	lakefront port town
Yamagata	25,000	23,000	21,000	17,631	castle town
Kōfu	26,000	24,000	22,000	15,529	castle town
Tsuruga	21,000	15,000	13,000	11,476	castle town
Ōgaki	22,000	20,000	18,000	10,158	castle town

Estimated populations of castle towns contain considerable errors compared to those of the business towns (Ōsaka, Sakai, Hyōgo, Niigata, Nagasaki, Hakodate and Fushimi) with fewer samurai-class inhabitants, because demographics of samurai classes and their servants (or dwellers of samurai districts) were recorded separately or kept secret, which easily lead to the loss of original data after the abolition of the Han system. On the other hand, the demography of chōnin classes (civilian), or dwellers of chōnin districts plus chōnin classes who dwelt in temple/shrine districts (i.e. excluding demographics of Buddhist monks, nuns and Shintō priests which were usually summed separately), rather remain recorded for most of the cases.

Even the peak estimated population of Edo varies from 788,000 to 1,500,000. For example, Yoshida (1910) estimated the peak population of Edo (shortly before Perry's expeditions) at 1,400,000 based on the average amount of rice carried into Edo (1,400,000 koku per year). Chandler (1987) estimated the peak population of Edo at 788,000 by adding samurai population as 3/8 of the recorded chōnin population. Sekiyama (1958) estimated the peak population of Edo at 1,100,000 by adding samurai and servants population as 500,000 (215,000 Hatamoto, Gokenin, their servants and families, 100,000 shōgun's Ashigaru, other lower servants and their families, 180,000 Daimyo, their servants and their families). Diaries recorded that the population of Edo was 1,287,800 in 1837, the population of monks and priests was ca. 40,000 or the samurai population of Edo was 700,973. According to the map of Edo illustrated in 1725, area for samurai occupied 66.4% of the total area of Edo (estimated population density: 13,988 /km^{2} for 650,000 individuals), while areas for chōnin and temples-shrines occupied 12.5% (estimated chōnin population density: 68,807 /km^{2} for 600,000 individuals) and 15.4% (estimated population density: 4,655 /km^{2} for 50,000 individuals), respectively.

Divisional area sizes of urbans in early Edo period (Naitō, 1983).
Urban	Year	Total areas	Imperial and nobiliary districts	Samurai districts (including castles)	Chōnin districts	Temples and shrines districts	Other districts
Edo	ca. 1647	43.95 km^{2}		34.06 km^{2} (77.4%)	4.29 km^{2} (9.8%)	4.50 km^{2} (10.3%)	1.10 km^{2} (2.5%)
Edo	1670–1673	63.42 km^{2}		43.66 km^{2} (68.9%)	6.75 km^{2} (10.6%)	7.90 km^{2} (12.4%)	5.11 km^{2} (8.1%)
Edo	1725	69.93 km^{2}		46.47 km^{2} (66.4%)	8.72 km^{2} (12.5%)	10.74 km^{2} (15.4%)	4.00 km^{2} (5.7%)
Edo	1865	79.8 km^{2}		50.7 km^{2} (63.5%)	14.2 km^{2} (17.8%)	10.1 km^{2} (12.7%)	4.8 km^{2} (6.0%)
Edo	1869	56.36 km^{2}		38.65 km^{2} (68.6%)	8.92 km^{2} (15.8%)	8.80 km^{2} (15.6%)	
Kyōto (Rakuchū, or within walls)	ca. 1647	20.87 km^{2}	0.68 km^{2} (3.3%)	1.05 km^{2} (5.0%)	8.37 km^{2} (40.1%)	2.92 km^{2} (14.0%)	7.85 km^{2} (37.6%)
Ōsaka	ca. 1655	15.05 km^{2}		3.36 km^{2} (22.3%)	8.68 km^{2} (57.7%)	1.18 km^{2} (7.8%)	1.83 km^{2} (12.2%)
Sendai	ca. 1647	10.37 km^{2}		7.56 km^{2} (72.9%)	1.15 km^{2} (11.1%)	1.66 km^{2} (16.0%)	
Nagoya	ca. 1660	9.20 km^{2}		5.69 km^{2} (61.8%)	2.18 km^{2} (23.7%)	1.14 km^{2} (12.4%)	0.19 km^{2} (2.1%)
Kanazawa	ca. 1647	7.46 km^{2}		4.91 km^{2} (65.8%)	1.58 km^{2} (21.2%)	0.79 km^{2} (10.6%)	0.18 km^{2} (2.4%)

Selected recorded populations of urbans listed above are as follows. Sources for koseki censuses are given in Japanese Wikipedia page.

- Edo: 353,588 (chōnin, in 6th month of 1693); 501,394 (chōnin, in 11th month of 1721); 533,763 (chōnin, in 4th month of 1734); 509,708 (chōnin, 7,442 eta–hinin excluded, in 12th month of 1750); 457,083 (chōnin, in 1786); 492,449 (chōnin, in 5th month of 1798); 545,623 (chōnin, in 5th month of 1832); 587,458 (553,257 registered plus 34,201 temporal chōnin, in 7 month of 1843); 569,549 (559,115 registered plus 10,434 temporal chōnin, 10,008 eta–hin excluded, in 4th month of 1850); 584,166 (575,091 registered plus 9,075 temporal chōnin, in 9th month of 1853); 543,079 (538,463 registered plus 4,616 temporal chōnin, in 9th month of 1867); 674,447 (all classes, as of 1st day of 1st month in 1869). Recorded populations of Yoshiwara girls (8,679), Buddhist monks in temples (36,695), Buddhist monks outside temples (4,277), Shintō priests in shrines (5,843), Buddhist nuns (6,722), Shintō priests outside shrines (5,831), the blind (1,284) in 1743.
- Ōsaka: 279,610 (chōnin, in 1625); 252,446 (chōnin, in 1661); 364,154 (chōnin, in 1699); 383,480 (382,471 chōnin plus 1,009 monks in 1721); 404,146 (chōnin and monks, in 1749); 419,863 (chōnin and monks, 3,590 eta excluded, in 1765); 379,121 (chōnin and monks, 4,423 eta excluded, in 1800); 369,173 (chōnin and monks, 5,122 eta excluded, in 1832); 330,637 (chōnin and monks, 4,450 eta excluded, in 1850); 301,093 (chōnin and monks, in 1862); 281,306 (all classes, in 1868). Present town of Ōsaka began from a temple town of Ishiyama Hongan-ji, where 2,000 houses were reported in 1562. On the other hand, number of houses for Tennnōji, a temple town of Shitennō-ji, was described as 7,000 in 1499. Ōsaka and Tenōji were connected by a suburb town of Hirano: 10,851 (chōnin, in 1688); 10,991 (chōnin, in 1690); 9,272 (chōnin, in 1702); 9,439 (chōnin, 100 eta excluded, in 1756); 8,142 (chōnin, 124 eta excluded, in 1799); 7,958 (chōnin, 246 eta excluded, in 1850), 7,948 (chōnin, 253 eta excluded, in 1863). Both Tennōji and Namba were suburb towns of Ōsaka with estimated populations of ca. 10,000 during Edo era. The history of Namba or Naniwa is much older; estimated population of Naniwa was 35,000 during Nara period.
- Kyōto: 410,089 (chōnin in chōnin districts, Rakuchū (inside walls), in 1634); 362,322 (chōnin in chōnin districts, Rakuchū, in 1661); 408,723 (chōnin (372,810 in chōnin districts, Rakuchū plus 35,918 in chōnin districts, Rakugai (outside walls)), in 1674); 388,142 (chōnin (321,449 in chōnin districts, Rakuchū; 32,258 in chōnin districts, Rakugai; 6,611 in temples and shrines, Rakuchū; 27,824 in temples and shrines, Rakugai), in 1683); 372,972 (chōnin (317,936 in chōnin districts, Rakuchū; 33,756 in chōnin districts, Rakugai; 2,780 in temples and shrines, Rakuchū; 18,500 in temples and shrines, Rakugai), in 1700); 374,449 (chōnin (345,882 in chōnin districts, Rakuchū plus 28,567 in chōnin districts, Rakugai), in 1729); 318,016 (chōnin (255,947 in chōnin districts, Rakuchū plus 62,069 in chōnin districts, Rakugai), in 1766); 237,674 (all classes, in 1871). The urban areas of Kyōto and Fushimi were connected by built-up area by 19th century.
- Nagoya: 54,932 (chōnin, in 1654); 63,734 (chōnin, in 1692); 55,665 (chōnin, in 1694); 42,135 (chōnin, in 1721); 73,583 (chōnin, in 1750); 75,779 (chōnin, in 1840); 73,963 (chōnin, 757 doctors and 103 rōnin included, in 1865); 71,698 (69,618 chōnin plus 860 doctors, monks and priests, in 1871).
- Kanazawa: 55,106 (chōnin, in 1664); 68,636 (chōnin, in 1697); 64,987 (chōnin, in 1710); 56,355 (chōnin, in 1810); 58,506 (chōnin, in 1857); 60,789 (chōnin, in 1869); 123,363 (all classes including 26,038 upper samurai, 26,888 lower samurai, 68,810 commons, 139 priests, 1,032 monks and 456 convicts, in 1871).
- Kagoshima: 49,096 (all classes in gō of Kagoshima, in 1684); 59,816 (all classes in gō of Kagoshima, 15,176 upper samurai, 27,725 lower samurai, 318 monks, 5,737 chōnin in main three towns, 104 chōnin in Yokoi town, 123 fisherfolks, 10,382 farmers and 89 discriminated, in 1772); 61,507 (all classes in gō of Kagoshima, 15,728 upper samurai, 28,113 lower samurai, 289 monks, 5,185 chōnin in main three towns, 115 chōnin in Yokoi town, 98 fisherfolks, 11,954 farmers and 25 discriminated, in 1800); 76,998 (all classes in gō of Kagoshima, 18,171 upper samurai, 39,922 lower samurai, 303 monks, 4,040 chōnin in main three towns, 129 chōnin in Yokoi town, 66 fisherfolks, 14,281 farmers and 86 discriminated, in 1852); 85,435 (all classes in gō of Kagoshima, 26,992 upper samurai, 2,671 lower samurai and 55,872 commons, in 1871). Population as of Jan 1, 1873 (27,240): only those living in chōnin districts.
- Hiroshima: 37,212 (36,142 chōnin plus 1,070 monks, in 1663); 48,351 (37,155 chōnin, 10,855 in suburb and 341 discriminated, in 1715); 33,191 (chōnin, in 1746); 29,247 (chōnin, in 1800); 50,092 (24,776 chōnin, 23,884 in suburb and 1,432 discriminated, in 1822).
- Yokohama: 88 houses (ca. 450 persons) in 1840.
- Wakayama: 42,314 (chōnin over 7 years old, in 1699); 57,005 (chōnin of all ages, in 1700 or 1728).
- Sendai: 25,590 (22,706 chōnin, 631 monks and 2,253 in temples district, in 1695); 26,623 (20,374 chōnin, 863 monks and 5,386 in temples district, in 1742); 15,617 (11,610 chōnin, 594 monks and 3,413 in temples district in 1772); 17,798 (13,302 chōnin, 652 monks and 3,840 in temples district, in 1802); 18,444 (13,749 chōnin, 710 monks and 3,985 in temples district, in 1825).
- Tokushima: 18,826 (chōnin in 1670); 20,590 (chōnin in 1685).
- Hagi: 5,300 (chōnin, in 1667); 12,260 (chōnin, in 1707); 14,633 (chōnin, in 1716); 10,791 (chōnin, in 1789); 16,424 (chōnin, in 1817/1818).
- Shuri: 8,455 (2,322 samurai plus 6,133 commons, in 1654); 16,210 (4,492 samurai plus 11,718 commons, in 1691); 20,861 (9,612 samurai plus 11,249 commons, in 1729).
- Toyama: 16,000 (chōnin, in 1661); 23,903 (7,603 samurai plus 16,210 chōnin, in 1676); 17,600 (chōnin, in ca 1700); 20,000 (chōnin, in 1761); 34,228 (6,840 samurai plus 27,388 chōnin, in 1810); 26,936 (chōnin, in 1841).
- Kumamoto: 12,841 (samurai included, in 1611); 24,735 (chōnin, in ca. 1680); 19,939 (chōnin, in 1734); 20,881 (chōnin, in 1754); 18,470 (chōnin, in 1798); 21,300 (chōnin, in 1830).
- Hyōgo: 19,766 (chōnin, in ca. 1725); 21,030 (chōnin, in 1759); 22,774 (chōnin, in 1769); 20,853 (chōnin, in 1800); 20,942 (chōnin, in 1832); 21,861 (chōnin, in 1850); 27,476 (all classes, as of Jan 1, 1873). Kōbe: 1,391 (chōnin, in 1690); 1,985 (chōnin, in 1760); 2,637 (chōnin, in 1830); 2,547 (chōnin, in 1850); 8,554 (all classes, as of Jan 1, 1873). Sudden increase in population began in 1869, when the Port of Kōbe was opened to foreigners, while the port of Hyōgo was already one of the important ports of Japan for domestic transport.
- Hakata: 17,948 (chōnin, in 1669); 19,468 (chōnin, in 1690); 17,842 (chōnin, in 1718); 15,448 (chōnin, in 1750); 14,619 (chōnin, in 1812); 20,985 (all classes, as of Jan 1, 1873). Fukuoka: 15,009 (chōnin, in 1690); 13,675 (chōnin, in 1718); 7,470 (chōnin, in 1806); 20,650 (all classes, as of Jan 1, 1873). Hakata was already an important port since 12th century. On the other hand, Fukuoka area was built as a new castle town of the Fukuoka domain in 1600, named after a place in Setouchi, Okayama where the Kuroda clans grew.
- Fukui: 25,331 (chōnin, in ca. 1610); 21,393 (chōnin, in 1712); 20,533 (chōnin, in 1750); 18,364 (chōnin, in 1792); 32,613 (12,832 samurai plus 19,781 chōnin, in 1847).
- Kōchi: 17,054 (chōnin, in 1665); 21,351 (5,693 samurai plus 14,658 chōnin, in 1762); 13,985 (chōnin, in 1819); 15,895 (chōnin, in 1852).
- Sakai: 69,368 (chōnin, in 1663); 56,997 (chōnin, in 1703); 47,928 (chōnin, in 1746); 44,496 (chōnin, in 1813); 40,977 (chōnin, in 1848); 37,153 (chōnin, in 1859). Sakai was an important port during Muromachi period. A total of 10,000 houses in 1399.
- Kubota: 20,828 (chōnin, 15,257 in Kubora and 5,571 in Minato (present Tsuchizaki area in Akita), in 1730); 21,313 (chōnin both in Kubota and Minato, in 1747); 16,387 (chōnin, 11,450 in Kubota and 4,937 in Minato, in 1844); 16,990 (chōnin both in Kubota and Mianto, in 1850); 18,082 (chōnin both in Kubota and Mianto, in 1859); 46,677 (all classes, 38,118 in Akita and 8,559 in Tuchizaki-minato, as of Jan 1, 1873).
- Matsue: 28,564 (15,019 samurai plus 13,545 chōnin, in 1761); 29,263 (15,268 samurai plus 13,995 chōnin, in 1787); 31,161 (15,635 samurai plus 15,526 chōnin, in 1787); 36,073 (15,567 samurai plus 20,506 chōnin, in 1838).
- Niigata: 2,500 houses (chōnin, in 1697); 20,800–20,900 (chōnin, in 1818), 25,467 (chōnin, in 1850).
- Hirosaki: 17,362 (chōnin, in 1694); 31,200 (14,600 samurai plus 16,600 chōnin; in 1765); 26,730 (samurai and chōnin, in 1800); 36,036 (21,004 samurai, 14,540 chōnin, 492 monks and priests, in 1837); 14,850 (chōnin, in 1858); 38,848 (21,926 samurai plus 16,922 chōnin, in 1866).
- Takamatsu: 12,943 (chōnin, in 1642); 24,243 (chōnin, in 1667); 30,195 (5,273 samurai and 24,922 chōnin, in 1838).
- Okayama: 28,669 (chōnin, in 1667); 30,635 (chōnin, in 1707); 24,556 (chōnin, in 1753); 21,357 (chōnin, in 1798); 20,086 (chōnin, in 1854); 20,670 (chōnin, in 1869).
- Sumpu: 17,067 (chōnin, in 1692); 16,163 (chōnin, in 1762); 15,724 (chōnin, in 1850).
- Nagasaki: 24,693 (chōnin, in 1616); 40,700 (chōnin, in 1659); 53,522 (chōnin, in 1694); 50,148 (chōnin, in 1703); 41,553 (chōnin, in 1715); 29,897 (chōnin, in 1771), 31,893 (chōnin, in 1789); 29,962 (chōnin, in 1841); 27,343 (chōnin, in 1853); 27,381 (chōnin, in 1856).
- Hakodate: 2,595 (chōnin, in 1801); 9,480 (637 samurai, 8,682 chōnin, plus 161 monks and priests, in 1850); 18,609 (all classes including temporal residents, 14,660 permanent residents, in 1867).
- Takada: 21,567 (chōnin, in 1681); 17,429 (chōnin, in 1701); 15,832 (chōnin, in 1741); 18,383 (chōnin, in 1838); 17,906 (chōnin, in 1843); 19,060 (chōnin, in 1869).
- Matsuyama: 16,604 (chōnin, in 1691); 11,528 (chōnin, in 1789); 11,598 (chōnin, in 1820).
- Tsuruoka: 7,837 (chōnin, in 1667); 10,951 (chōnin, in 1700); 17,705 (9,206 samurai plus 8,499 chōnin, in 1770); 8,406 (chōnin, in 1840).
- Yonezawa: 6,207 (chōnin, in 1595); 12,129 (chōnin, in 1692); 11,481 (chōnin, in 1701); 16,099 (chōnin, in 1776); 6,667 (chōnin, in 1840); 6,920 (chōnin, in 1850); 6,943 (chōnin, in 1862).
- Himeji: 22,125 (chōnin, in 1648); 24,140 (chōnin, in 1667); 21,526 (chōnin, in ca. 1700); 18,769 (chōnin, in 1749); 14,725 (chōnin, in 1809); 13,872 (chōnin, in 1845).
- Hikone: 15,505 (chōnin, in 1695); 15,675 (chōnin, in ca. 1802); 13,162 (chōnin, in 1869).
- Nagaoka: 5,781 (chōnin, in 1694).
- Takaoka: 13,085 (chōnin, in 1699); 10,681 (chōnin, in 1761); 15,582 (chōnin, in 1771); 15,465 (chōnin, in 1785); 12,037 (chōnin, in 1816).
- Yamada: 23,622 (chōnin over 14 years old, in 1627); 30,929 (chōnin, in 1629); 39,621 (chōnin in 1717). Uji: 3,592 (chōnin, in 1629).
- Fushimi: 25,249 (chōnin, in 1690); 28,743 (chōnin, in 1700); 27,450 (chōnin, in ca. 1770); 33,385 (chōnin, in ca. 1786); 40,980 (chōnin, in ca. 1843). The urban areas of Kyōto and Fushimi were connected by built-up area by 19th century.
- Annōtsu: 12,205 (chōnin, in 1665); 12,261 (chōnin, in 1666); 11,648 (chōnin, in 1701); 11,262 (chōnin, in 1731); 7,170 (chōnin, males over 15 years old plus females over 13 years old, in 1759).
- Saga: 31,450 (13,451 samurai plus 17,999 chōnin, in 1687); 20,084 (6,373 samurai plus 13,711 chōnin, in 1854).
- Morioka: 12,324 (chōnin, in 1683); 14,209 (chōnin, in 1700); 15,726 (chōnin, in 1750); 17,941 (chōnin, in 1798); 18,824 (chōnin, in 1803); 17,966 (chōnin, in 1840)
- Nara: 34,985 (25,054 chōnin plus 9,931 in temples and shrines districts, in 1631); 28,243 (chōnin, in 1680); 35,369 (26,420 chōnin plus 8,949 in temples and shrines districts, in 1698); 23,500 (chōnin, in 1714); 22,538 (chōnin, in 1726); 22,146 (chōnin, in 1729); 20,081 (chōnin, in 1740); 19,210 (chōnin, in 1744); 20,661 (16,004 chōnin plus 5,657 in temples and shrines districts, in 1857).
- Tottori: population of chōnin: 13,125 (chōnin, in 1749); 10,228 (chōnin, in 1810); 11,440 (chōnin, in 1846).
- Wakamatsu: population of chōnin: 18,435 (in 1666); 20,700 (in 1697);16,700 (in 1718); 11,670 (in 1788).
- Kurume: population of chōnin: 8,764 (in 1699); 8,888 (in 1706); 7,631 (in 1780); 8,632 (in 1822); 11,208 (in 1858).
- Kuwana: population of chōnin: 12,520 (in 1679); 13,160 (in ca. 1700); 11,902 (in 1710); 10,857 (in 1750); 8,527 (in 1822), 8,848 (in 1843).
- Ōtsu: population of chōnin: 18,774 (in 1691); 17,810 (in 1699); 17,568 (in 1714); 17,481 (in 1719); 16,072 (in 1766); 14,950 (in 1783); 14,892 (in 1843).
- Yamagata: population of chōnin: 13,981 (chōnin, in 1622); 13,507 (in 1697); 17,508 (in 1738); 12,586 (in 1746); 15,214 (in 1753).
- Kōfu: population of chōnin: 12,772 (in 1670); 14,334 (1689); 13,539 (in 1697); 12,699 (in 1705); 13,306 (in 1710); 9,290 (in 1724); 9,566 (in 1806); 11,071 (chōnin, in 1864).
- Tsuruga: population of chōnin: 15,101 (in 1663); 11,345 (in 1679); 13,568 (in 1681); 10,600 (in 1726); 11,506 (in 1729); 8,900 (chōnin, in 1840); 12,296 (in 1854).
- Ōgaki: population of chōnin: 5,543 (in 1721); 5,343 (in 1785); 5,522 (in 1837); 5,097 (in 1843).

== See also ==
- Demographics of the Empire of Japan
- Demographics of Japan
- Japanese people

== Books ==
- Takahashi, Bonsen, "Nihon jinkō-shi no kyū (日本人口史之研究, Study in Demographic History of Japan)", Sanyūsha, Tokyo:Japan, 1941.
- Sekiyama, Naotarō, "Kinsei Nihon no jinkō no kōzō (近世日本の人口構造, Demographic Structure of Early Modern Japan)", Yoshikawa Kōbunkan, Tokyo:Japan, 1958.
- Hayami, Akira, ed., "Kokusei chōsa izen Nihon jinkō tōkei shūsei (国勢調査以前日本人口統計集成, Collected Japanese Population Statistics before Modern Census)", Hara Shobō, Tokyo:Japan, 1992.

Historical censuses of provinces during Edo era summarized by Hayami is also given in the following paper:
- Hayami, Akira, "Chronology of Population Statistics in Early Meiji Japan", Nihon Bunka, (9), pp. 135–164 (1993).
