= Provinces of Japan =

Previous first-level administrative divisions of Japan

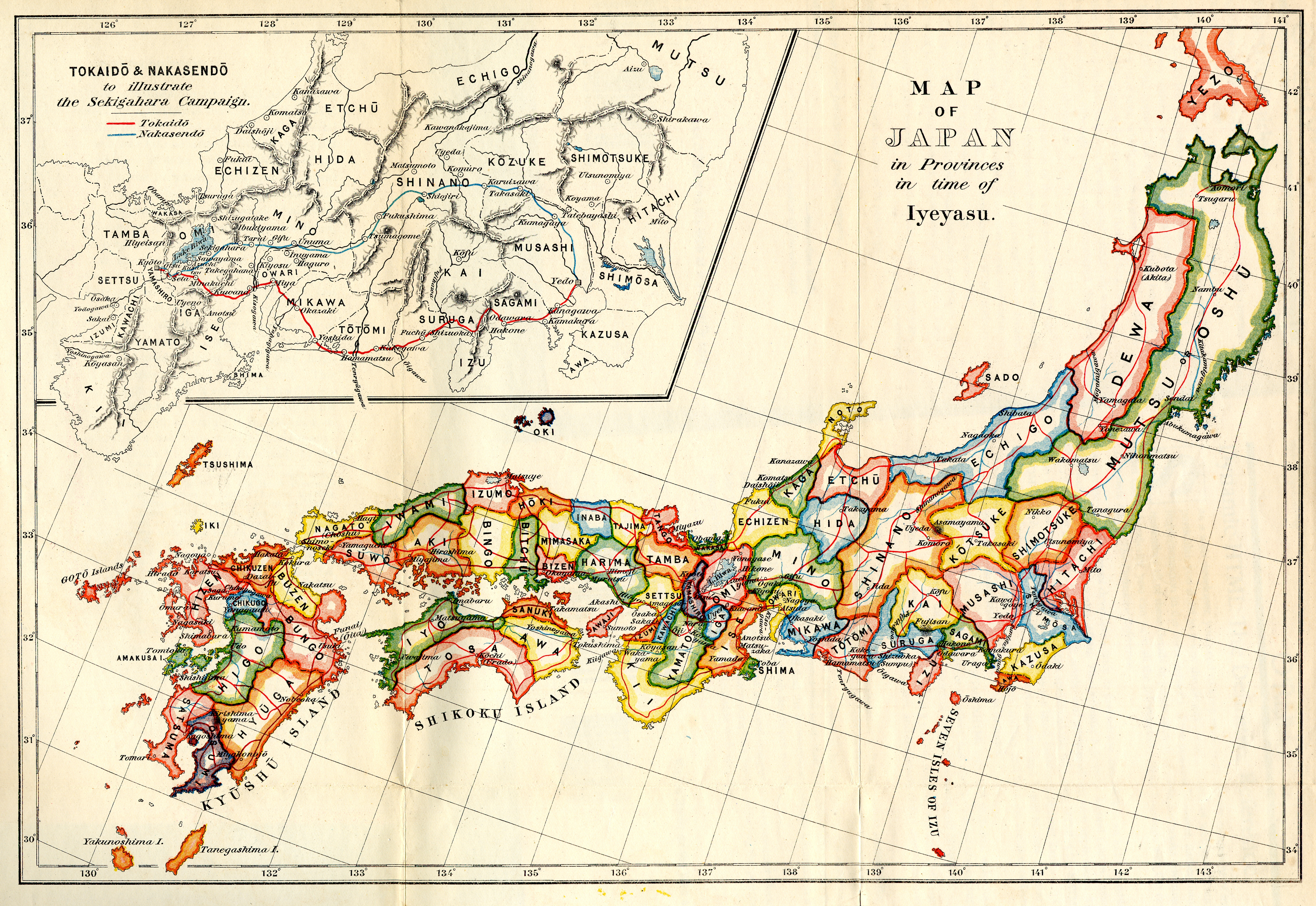
The Provinces of Japan c. 1600 Hiking, from Murdoch and Yamagata published in 1903

Provinces of Japan (令制国, Ryōseikoku) were first-level administrative divisions of Japan from the 600s to 1871.

Provinces were established in Japan in the late 7th century under the Ritsuryō law system that formed the first central government. Each province was divided into districts (郡, gun) and grouped into one of the geographic regions or circuits known as the Gokishichidō (Five Home Provinces and Seven Circuits). Provincial borders often changed until the end of the Nara period (710 to 794), but remained unchanged from the Heian period (794 to 1185) until the Edo period (1603 to 1868). The provinces coexisted with the han (domain) system, the personal estates of feudal lords and warriors, and became secondary to the domains in the late Muromachi period (1336 to 1573).

The Provinces of Japan were replaced with the current prefecture system in the Fuhanken sanchisei during the Meiji Restoration from 1868 to 1871, except for Hokkaido, which was divided into provinces from 1869 to 1882. No order has ever been issued explicitly abolishing the provinces, but they are considered obsolete as administrative units. The provinces are still used in general conversation, especially in navigation and transportation, and referenced in products and geographical features of the prefectures covering their former territories.

== History ==
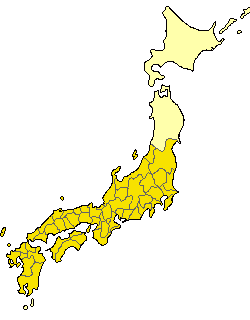
Provinces of Japan in 701–702 during the Asuka period. The northern half of the modern Tōhoku region of Honshu is unorganized.

The provinces were originally established by the Ritsuryō reforms as both administrative units and geographic regions. From the late Muromachi period, however, they were gradually supplanted by the domains of the sengoku daimyō. Under the rule of Toyotomi Hideyoshi during Azuchi–Momoyama period, the provinces were supplemented as primary local administrative units. The local daimyōs' fiefs were developed.

=== Edo period ===
In the Edo period, the fiefs became known as han. Imperial provinces and shogunal domains made up complementary systems. For example, when the shōgun ordered a daimyō to make a census or to make maps, the work was organized in terms of the boundaries of the provincial kuni.

=== Meiji period ===
At the Meiji Restoration, the han were legitimized as administrative units by the reform known as the Fuhanken Sanchisei, but they were gradually replaced by prefectures between 1868 and 1871 (urban prefectures were called fu and rural prefectures ken). Provinces as part of the system of addresses were not abolished but, on the contrary, augmented. As of 1871, the number of prefectures was 304, while the number of provinces was 68, not including Hokkaidō or the Ryūkyū Islands. The boundaries between the many prefectures were not only very complicated, but also did not match those of the provinces. Prefectures were gradually merged to reduce the number to 37 by 1881; a few were then divided to give a total of 45 by 1885. Adding Hokkaidō and Okinawa produced the current total of 47 prefectures.

Provinces are classified into Kinai (in or near the capital, then Kyoto) and seven or eight dō (routes, or circuits), collectively known as the Gokishichidō. However, dō in this context should not be confused with modern traffic lines such as the Tōkaidō from Tokyo to Kyoto or Kobe. Also, Hokkaidō in this context should not be confused with Hokkaidō Prefecture, although these two overlap geographically.

=== Today ===
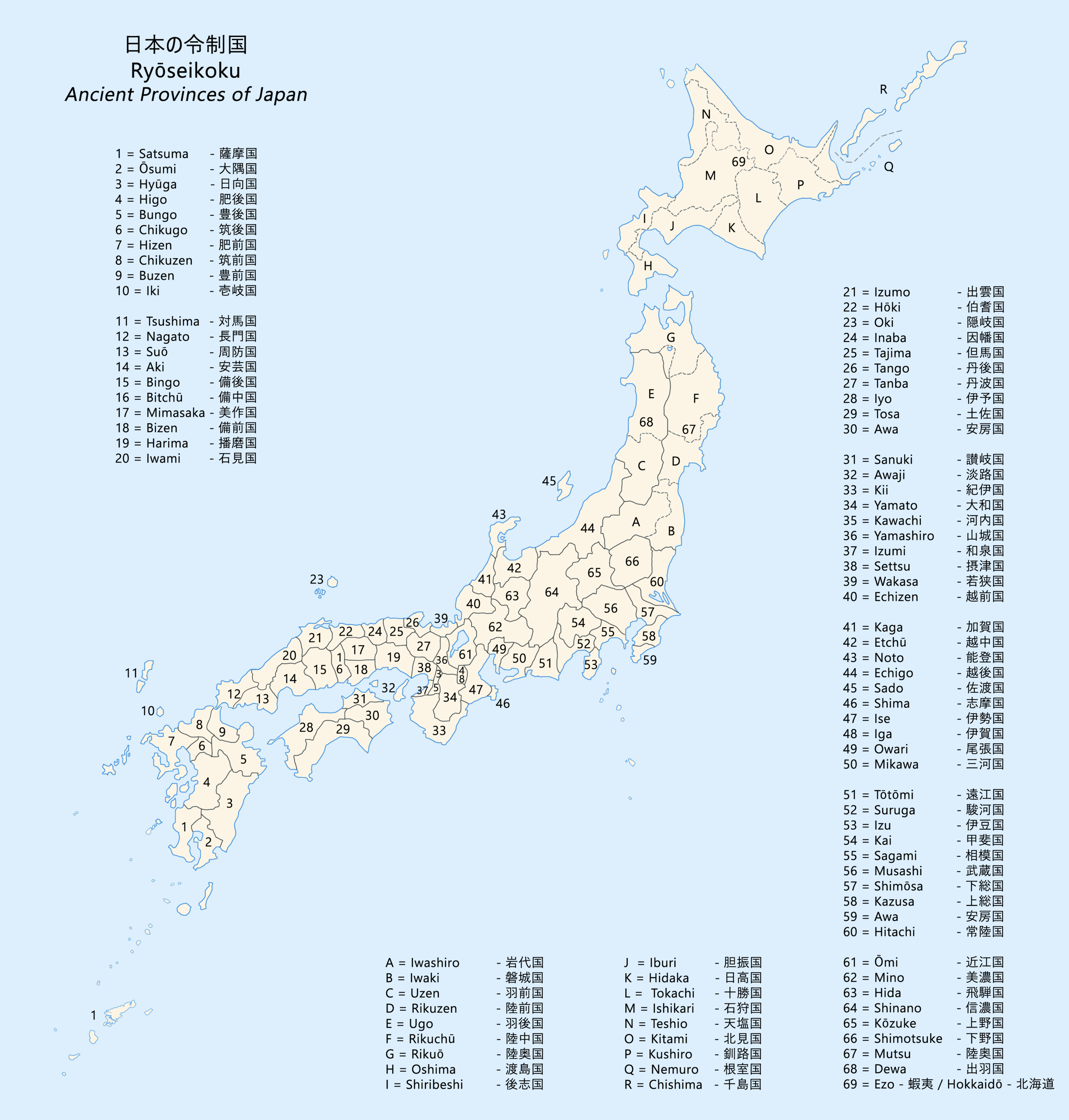
List of provinces of Japan including Hokkaido and the districts of Mutsu Province and Dewa Province

No order has ever been issued explicitly abolishing the provinces, but they are considered obsolete. Nevertheless, their names are still widely used in names of natural features, company names, and brands. These province names are considered to be mainly of historical interest. They are also used for the names of items, including family names, most of which were popularized in or after the Edo period. Examples include sanuki udon, iyokan, tosa ken, Chikuzenni, and awa odori. Japan Railways and other railway companies also use them in station names to distinguish between similarly named stations in other prefectures, such as Musashi-Kosugi Station. The same is true for some city names, for example to distinguish Yamato-Kōriyama, Nara from Kōriyama, Fukushima. Simplified names of provinces (-shū) are also used, such as Shinshū soba and Kishū dog.

Some of the province names are used to indicate distinct parts of the current prefectures along with their cultural and geographical characteristics. In many cases these names are also in use with directional characters, e.g. Hoku-Setsu (北摂) meaning Northern (北) Settsu (摂津) area.

The districts are still considered prefectural subdivisions, but following mergers or divisions of the provinces they may be shared among several prefectures (such as the original Adachi District of Musashi, which is now divided between Adachi Ward in Tokyo and Kita-Adachi District in Saitama). Many of these old provincial districts have been dissolved as their chief towns have been merged into larger cities or towns. See individual prefecture pages for mergers and abolitions of districts.

The following list is based on the Gokishichidō (五畿七道), which includes short-lived provinces. Provinces located within Hokkaidō are listed last.

== Goki (五畿, Five Provinces in Capital Region) ==
Map of the Gokishichidō divisions with their respective regions. Hokkaidō and its provinces are not included; in 1869, when Hokkaidō was included, it was called Gokihachidō. Kinai: Tōkaidō / Tōsandō / Hokurikudō; San'indō / San'yōdō / Nankaidō; Saikaidō

=== Kinai (畿内, Capital Region) ===
- Yamashiro (Jōshū, Sanshū, Yōshū) (山城国 (城州, 山州, 雍州))
- Yamato (Washū) (大和国 (和州))
  - c. 716 – c. 738
    - Yamato (大和国)
    - Yoshino (芳野監)
- Kawachi (Kashū) (河内国 (河州))
- Izumi (Senshū) (和泉国 (泉州)) - Created in 716 from Kawachi Province as Izumi Gen (和泉監). Although occupied by Kawachi Province in 740, in 757 the province divided again from Kawachi Province.
- Settsu (Sesshū) (摂津国 (摂州))

== Shichidō (七道, Seven Circuits) ==
=== Tōkaidō (東海道, East Sea Circuit) ===
- Iga (Ishū) (伊賀国 (伊州)) – separated from Ise Province in 680
- Ise (Seishū) (伊勢国 (勢州))
- Shima (Shishū) (志摩国 (志州)) – separated from Ise Province at the beginning of the 8th century
- Owari (Bishū) (尾張国 (尾州))
- Mikawa (Sanshū) (三河国 (三州))
- Tōtōmi (Enshū) (遠江国 (遠州))
- Suruga (Sunshū) (駿河国 (駿州))
- Izu (Zushū) (伊豆国 (豆州)) – separated from Suruga Province in 680
- Kai (Kōshū) (甲斐国 (甲州))
- Sagami (Sōshū) (相模国 (相州))
- Musashi (Bushū) (武蔵国 (武州)) – Transferred from Tōsandō to Tōkaidō in 771
- Awa (Bōshū, Anshū) (安房国 (房州, 安州)) – Divided from Kazusa Province in 718. Although re-joined to Kazusa Province in 741, separated from Kazusa Province again in 781
- Kazusa (Sōshū) (上総国 (総州)) – divided from Fusa Province (総国) in the 7th century
- Shimōsa (Sōshū) (下総国 (総州)) – divided from Fusa Province in the 7th century
- Hitachi (Jōshū) (常陸国 (常州))

=== Tōsandō (東山道, East Mountain Circuit) ===
- Ōmi (Gōshū) (近江国 (江州))
- Mino (Nōshū) (美濃国 (濃州))
- Hida (Hishū) (飛騨国 (飛州))
- Shinano (Shinshū) (信濃国 (信州))
  - from 721 to 731
    - Suwa (諏訪国)
    - Shinano (信濃国)
- Kōzuke (Jōshū) (上野国 (上州)) – divided from Keno Province (毛野国) during the 4th century
- Shimotsuke (Yashū) (下野国 (野州)) – divided from Keno Province during the 4th century
- Dewa (Ushū) (出羽国 (羽州)) – broke Dewa District in Echigo Province and create Dewa Province in 712. On October of the same year, Mogami and Okitama Districts in Mutsu Province merged into Dewa Province.
  - Since the 1868 breakup
    - Uzen (Ushū) (羽前国 (羽州))
    - Ugo (Ushū) (羽後国 (羽州))
- Mutsu (Ōshū, Rikushū) (陸奥国 (奥州, 陸州)) – split off from Hitachi Province in the 7th century
  - 718 for several years
    - Iwaki (石城国)
    - Iwase (石背国)
    - Mutsu (陸奥国)
  - Since the 1868 breakup
    - Iwashiro (Ganshū) (岩代国 (岩州))
    - Iwaki (Banshū) (磐城国 (磐州))
    - Rikuchū (Rikushū) (陸中国 (陸州))
    - Rikuzen (Rikushū) (陸前国 (陸州))
    - Mutsu (陸奥国)

=== Hokurikudō (北陸道, North Land Circuit) ===
- Wakasa (Jakushū) (若狭国 (若州))
- Echizen (Esshū) (越前国 (越州)) – broke off from Koshi Province (越国) during the end of the 7th century
- Kaga (Kashū) (加賀国 (加州)) – divided from Echizen Province in 823
- Noto (Nōshū) (能登国 (能州)) – divided from Echizen Province in 718. Although occupied by Etchu Province in 741, divided from Etchū Province in 757
- Etchū (Esshū) (越中国 (越州)) – broke off from Koshi Province during the end of the 7th century
- Echigo (Esshū) (越後国 (越州)) – broke off from Koshi Province during the end of the 7th century
- Sado (Sashū, Toshū) (佐渡国 (佐州, 渡州)) – although occupied by Echigo in 743, divided from Echigo in 752

=== San'indō (山陰道, Mountain's Shady Side Circuit) ===
- Tanba (Tanshū) (丹波国 (丹州))
- Tango (Tanshū) (丹後国 (丹州)) – divided from Tanba in 713
- Tajima (Tanshū) (但馬国 (但州))
- Inaba (Inshū) (因幡国 (因州))
- Hōki (Hakushū) (伯耆国 (伯州))
- Izumo (Unshū) (出雲国 (雲州))
- Iwami (Sekishū) (石見国 (石州))
- Oki (Onshū, Inshū) (隠岐国 (隠州))

=== San'yōdō (山陽道, Mountain's Sunny Side Circuit) ===
- Harima (Banshū) (播磨国 (播州))
- Mimasaka (Sakushū) (美作国 (作州)) – divided from Bizen Province in 713
- Bizen (Bishū) (備前国 (備州)) – broke off from Kibi (吉備国) during the 2nd half of the 7th century
- Bitchū (Bishū) (備中国 (備州)) – broke off from Kibi Province during the 2nd half of the 7th century
- Bingo (Bishū) (備後国 (備州)) – broke off from Kibi Province during the 2nd half of the 7th century
- Aki (Geishū) (安芸国 (芸州))
- Suō (Bōshū) (周防国 (防州))
- Nagato (Chōshū) (長門国 (長州))

=== Nankaidō (南海道, South Sea Circuit) ===
Equivalent to Shikoku and its surroundings, as well as a nearby area of Honshu

- Kii (Kishū) (紀伊国 (紀州))
- Awaji (Tanshū) (淡路国 (淡州))
- Awa (Ashū) (阿波国 (阿州))
- Sanuki (Sanshū) (讃岐国 (讃州))
- Iyo (Yoshū) (伊予国 (予州))
- Tosa (Doshū) (土佐国 (土州))

=== Saikaidō (西海道, West Sea Circuit) ===
Equivalent to Kyushu and its surroundings

- Buzen (Hōshū) (豊前国 (豊州)) – broke off from Toyo Province (豊国) at the end of the 7th century
- Bungo (Hōshū) (豊後国 (豊州)) – broke off from Toyo Province at the end of the 7th century
- Chikuzen (Chikushū) (筑前国 (筑州)) – broke off from Tsukushi Province (筑紫国) until the end of the 7th century
- Chikugo (Chikushū) (筑後国 (筑州)) – broke off from Tsukushi Province until the end of the 7th century
- Hizen (Hishū) (肥前国 (肥州)) – broke off from Hi Province (火国) until the end of the 7th century
- Higo (Hishū) (肥後国 (肥州)) – broke off from Hi Province until the end of the 7th century
- Hyūga (Nisshū, Kōshū) (日向国 (日州, 向州)) – earlier called Kumaso Province (熊曾国)
- Ōsumi (Gūshū) (大隅国 (隅州)) – divided from Hyūga Province in 713
  - From 702 to 824
    - Ōsumi (大隅国)
    - Tane (多褹国)
- Satsuma (Sasshū) (薩摩国 (薩州)) – divided from Hyūga Province in 702
- Iki (Isshū) (壱岐国 (壱州)) – officially Iki no Shima (壱岐嶋)
- Tsushima (Taishū) (対馬国 (対州)) – officially Tsushima no Shima (対馬嶋)

== Hachidō (八道, Eight Circuits) ==
Hokkaidō in red

=== Hokkaidō (北海道, North Sea Circuit) ===
Equivalent to Hokkaido and its surroundings. Originally known as the Ezo Region, before being renamed and organized as 11 provinces (1869–1882).

- Oshima (渡島国)
- Shiribeshi (後志国)
- Iburi (胆振国)
- Ishikari (石狩国)
- Teshio (天塩国)
- Kitami (北見国)
- Hidaka (日高国)
- Tokachi (十勝国)
- Kushiro (釧路国)
- Nemuro (根室国)
- Chishima (千島国) - After the Treaty of Saint Petersburg (1875), Japan added north of Urup Island and placed Uruppu (得撫郡), Shimushiru (新知郡), and Shumushu (占守郡) Districts.

== Gallery ==
Borders of the provinces from the Kamakura period until 1868

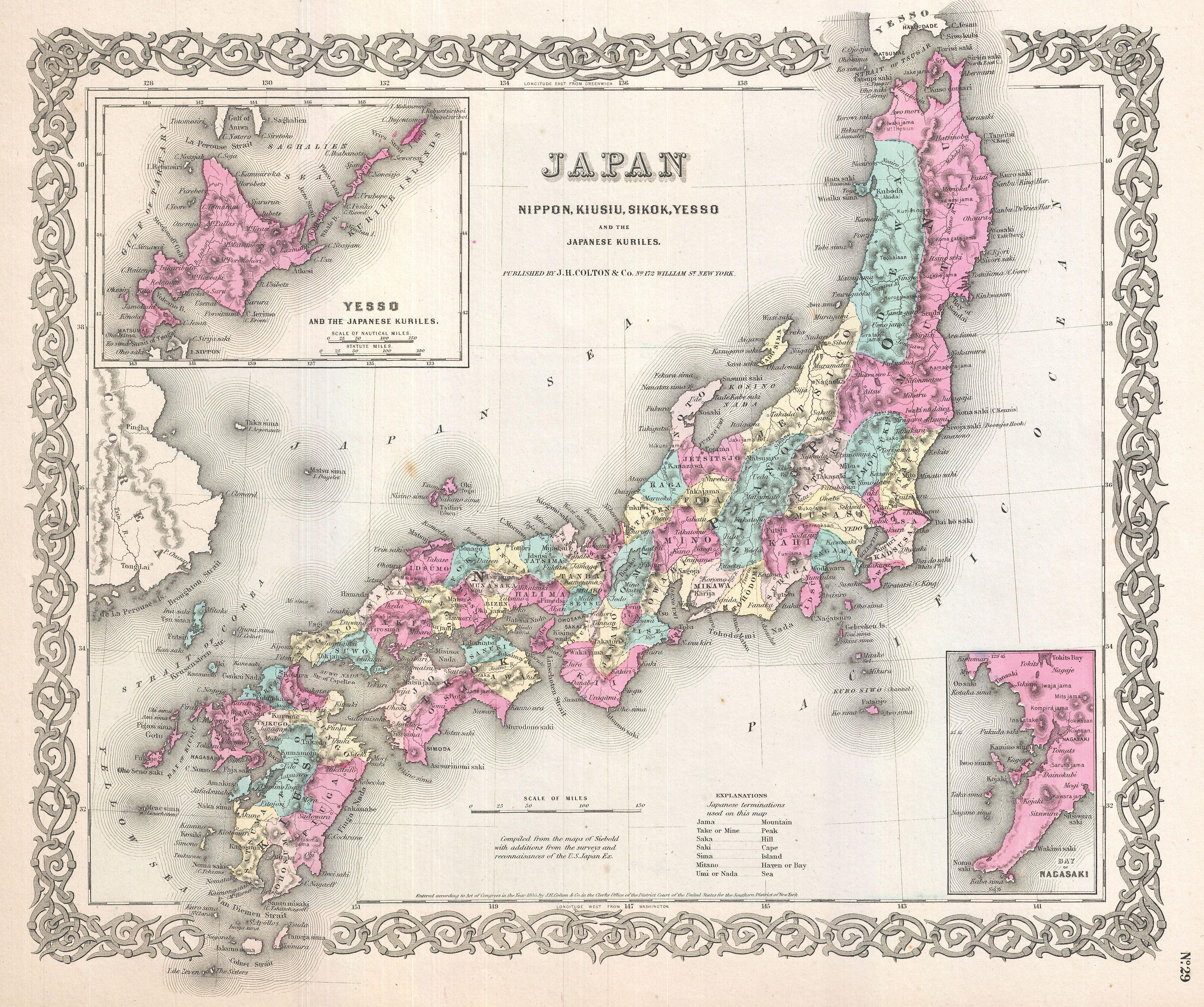
Map of Japan at the end of the Edo period published in the United States in 1855

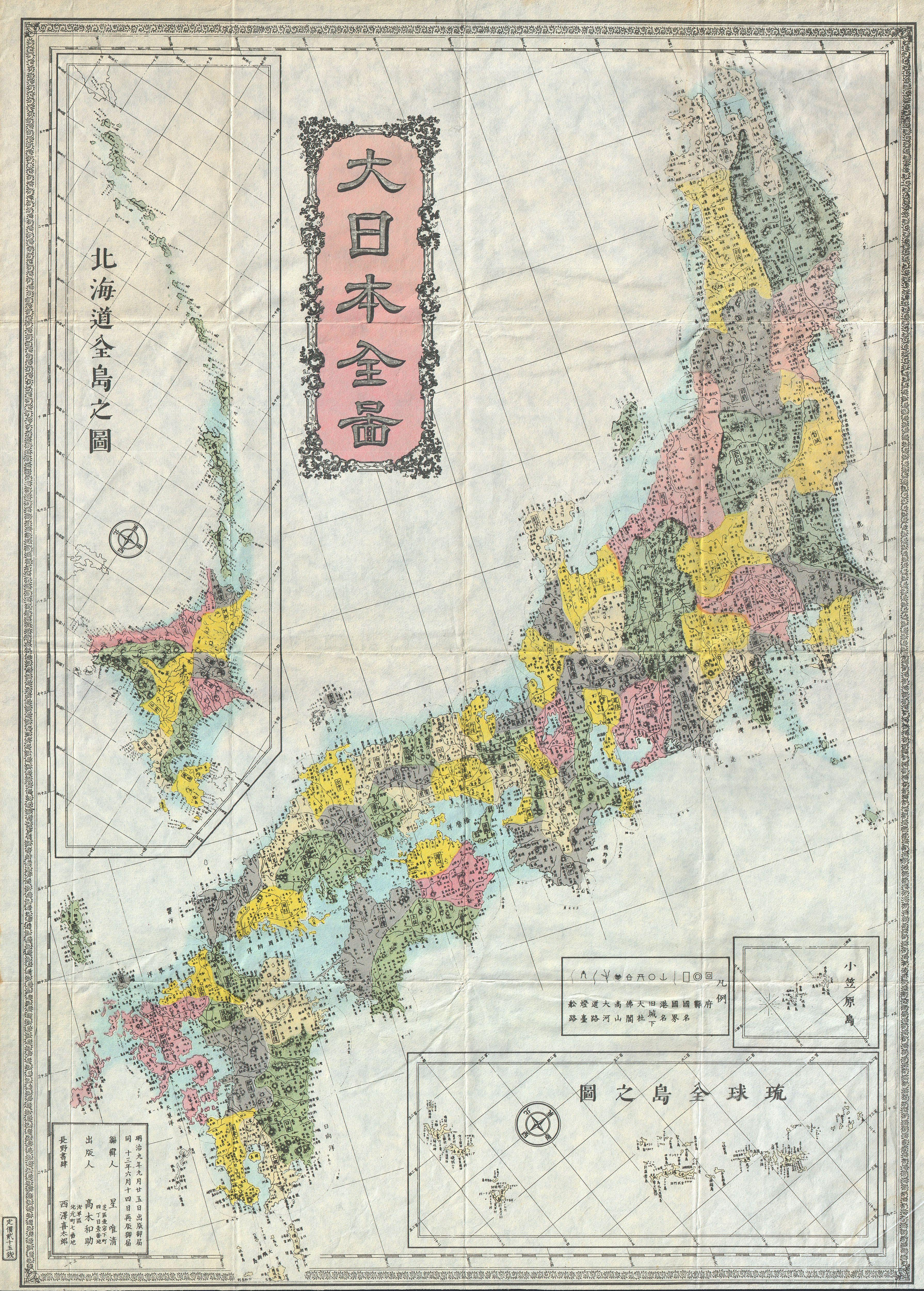
Meiji period map of Japan's provinces from c. 1880s, after their replacement with the prefectures

== See also ==
- Code of Taihō
- Magiri
- Kokushi (officials)
- Gokishichidō
- Demographics of Japan before Meiji Restoration
- Ritsuryō
- Han (administrative division)
- Samurai
