= Circuit (administrative division) =

Historical political division of China and Japan

- The inspection circuits of the Tang dynasty in 742

Dao (mainly Tang dynasty)
- Chinese: 道
- Literal meaning: way, path, circuit
Transcriptions
Standard Mandarin
- Hanyu Pinyin: dào
- Bopomofo: ㄉㄠˋ
- Wade–Giles: tao

Lu (Song and Jin dynasties)
- Chinese: 路
Transcriptions
Standard Mandarin
- Hanyu Pinyin: lù

Korean name
- Hangul: 도
- Hanja: 道
Transcriptions
- Revised Romanization: do
- McCune–Reischauer: to

Japanese name
- Kanji: 道
- Kana: どう
Transcriptions
- Romanization: dō

A circuit (Chinese: 道; pinyin: dào or Chinese: 路; pinyin: lù) was a historical political division of China and is a historical and modern administrative unit in Japan. The primary level of administrative division of Korea under the Joseon and in modern North and South Korea employs the same Chinese character as the Chinese and Japanese divisions but, because of its relatively greater importance, is usually translated as province instead.

== China ==
"Circuit"
Period	Chinese	Pinyin	Level
Han	道	dào	3rd
Tang, Liao	道	dào	1st
Song, Jin	路	lù	1st
Yuan	道	dào	2nd
Qing, ROC (12–28)	道	dào	2nd
ROC (32–49)	行政督察區	xíngzhèng dūchá qū	2nd

Circuits originated in China during the Han dynasty and were used as a lower-tier administrative division, comparable to the county (simplified Chinese: 县; traditional Chinese: 縣; pinyin: xiàn, also translated as "districts"). They were used only in the fringes of the empire, which were either inhabited primarily by non-Han Chinese peoples or too geographically isolated from the rest of the Han centers of power. The system fell into disuse after the collapse of the Western Jin dynasty.

The administrative division was revived in 627 when Tang Emperor Taizong made it the highest level administrative division and subdivided China into ten circuits. These were originally meant to be purely geographic and not administrative. Emperor Xuanzong added a further five, and slowly the circuits strengthened their own power until they became powerful regional forces that tore the country apart during the Five Dynasties and Ten Kingdoms period. During the Song and Jin dynasties, circuits (“dao”) were renamed lu (路), both of which mean "road" or "path".

Dao were revived during the Yuan dynasty. Circuits were demoted to the second level after the Yuan dynasty established provinces at the very top and remained there for the next several centuries. The Yuan dynasty also had lu (sometimes translated as "route"), but it was simply the Chinese word used for the Mongolian administrative unit, the cölge. The Yuan lu had little to do with the circuits (lu) in the Song and Jin dynasties and were closer in size to prefectures.

Under the Qing, they were overseen by a circuit intendant or tao-tai (Chinese: 道臺; pinyin: dàotái). The circuit intendant of Shanghai was particularly influential.

During the Republic of China era, circuits still existed as high-level, though not top-level, administrative divisions such as Qiongya Circuit (now Hainan province). After the Nationalists had successfully reunited China in 1928, all circuits were replaced with committees or simply abandoned. In 1932, administrative circuits (Chinese: 行政督察區; pinyin: xíngzhèng dūchá qū) were reintroduced and lasted until 1949.

In 1949, after the founding of the People's Republic of China, all of the administrative circuits were converted into zhuanqu (Chinese: 专区; pinyin: zhuānqū) in 1949 and renamed diqu (Chinese: 地区; pinyin: dìqū; lit. 'prefecture') in the 1970s.

== Japan ==
Gokishichidō in the context of modern prefectures.: Kinai / Tōkaidō / Tōsandō; Hokurikudō / San'indō / San'yōdō; Nankaidō / Saikaidō

During the Asuka period (538–710), Japan was organized into five provinces and seven circuits, known as the Gokishichidō (5 ki 7 dō), as part of a legal and governmental system borrowed from the Chinese. Though these units did not survive as administrative structures beyond the Muromachi period (1336–1573), they did remain important geographical entities until the 19th century. The seven circuits spread over the islands of Honshū, Shikoku, and Kyūshū:

- Tōkaidō (東海道) "East Sea Circuit": 15 provinces (kuni)
- Nankaidō (南海道) "South Sea Circuit": 6 provinces
- Saikaidō (西海道) "West Sea Circuit": 8 provinces
- Hokurikudō (北陸道) "North Land Circuit": 7 provinces
- San'indō (山陰道) "Shaded-side Circuit": 8 provinces
- San'yōdō (山陽道) "Sunny-side Circuit": 8 provinces
- Tōsandō (東山道) "East Mountain Circuit": 13 provinces

In the mid-19th century, the northern island of Ezo was settled, and renamed Hokkaidō (北海道, "North Sea Circuit"). It is currently the only prefecture of Japan named with the dō (circuit) suffix.

== Korea ==
Since the late 10th century, the do ("province") has been the primary administrative division in Korea. See Eight Provinces, Provinces of Korea, Subdivisions of South Korea and Administrative divisions of North Korea for details.

== See also ==
- Prefectures of Japan
- Provinces of Japan
