= Comparison of past and present administrative divisions of Japan =

The geography and administrative subdivisions of Japan have evolved and changed during the course of its history. These were sometimes grouped according to geographic position.

== Kinai ==
- Yamashiro
  - southern Kyoto
- Yamato (northern Nara without Yoshino)
  - entire Nara
- Yoshino (created from Yamato in 716, later rejoined back in 738)
  - southern Nara (Yoshino District + Gojō city)
- Kawachi
  - eastern Osaka
- Izumi (created in 716 from Kawachi, then rejoined back in 740, later re-split in 757)
  - southern/southwestern Osaka
- Settsu
  - northeastern Hyōgo including Kōbe city
  - northern/northwestern Osaka including Osaka city

== Tōkaidō ==
Tōkaidō literally means 'Eastern Sea Way'. The term also identifies a series of roads connecting the 15 provincial capitals of the region.

- Iga (created in 680 from Ise)
  - western Mie (Iga and Nabari cities)
- Ise
  - central/northern/southern Mie
- Shima (created at the beginning of the 8th century from Ise)
  - eastern Mie (Toba and Shima cities)
- Owari
  - western Aichi (around Nagoya)
- Mikawa
  - eastern Aichi (around Toyohashi)
- Tōtōmi
  - western Shizuoka (around Iwata)
- Suruga
  - central Shizuoka (around Shizuoka city)
- Izu (created 680 from Suruga)
  - eastern Shizuoka (Izu Peninsula)
  - Tokyo (Izu Islands)
- Kai
  - entire Yamanashi
- Sagami
  - southwestern Kanagawa (most)
- Musashi (transferred in 771 from Tōsandō)
  - northeastern Kanagawa (Yokohama and Kawasaki cities)
  - entire Tokyo (most)
  - entire Saitama (most)
  - western Chiba
- Awa (created in 718 from Kazusa, then rejoined back in 741, later re-split in 781)
  - southern Chiba
- Kazusa (broke off from Fusa in the 7th century)
  - central Chiba
- Shimōsa (broke off from Fusa in the 7th century)
  - northern Chiba
  - southeastern Ibaraki (around Kashima)
  - part of Saitama (west portion of the Edogawa River)
- Hitachi
  - central/northeastern Ibaraki

== Tōsandō ==
The Tōsandō is a region which straddles the central mountains of northern Honshū. The descriptive name also refers to a series of roads connecting the provincial capitals. Tōsandō included Musashi Province after 711.

- Ōmi
  - entire Shiga
- Mino
  - southern Gifu
- Hida
  - northern Gifu (around Takayama)
- Shinano
  - entire Nagano (northern Nagano without Suwa)
- Suwa (created in 721 from Shinano, later rejoined back in 731)
  - southern Nagano (Ina (Kamiina and Shimoina) and Suwa Districts)
- Kōzuke (broke off from Kenu during the 4th century)
  - entire Gunma
- Shimotsuke (broke off from Kenu during the 4th century)
  - entire Tochigi
- Uzen (broke off from Dewa during the Meiji Restoration in 1868)
  - southeastern Yamagata (most)
- Ugo (broke off from Dewa during the Meiji Restoration in 1868)
  - southwestern Akita (most)
  - northwestern Yamagata (Akumi District)
- Mutsu (created in the 7th century from Hitachi)
  - entire Aomori
  - northwestern Iwate
- Iwashiro (created during the Meiji Restoration in 1868 from Mutsu)
  - western/central Fukushima
- Iwaki (created during the Meiji Restoration in 1868 from Mutsu)
  - eastern Fukushima
  - southwestern Miyagi (Igu, Katta and Watari Districts)
- Rikuchū (created during the Meiji Restoration in 1868 from Mutsu)
  - northeastern Akita (Kazuno city and Kosaka town)
  - central/northeastern/southwestern Iwate (most)
- Rikuzen (created during the Meiji Restoration in 1868 from Mutsu)
  - southeastern Iwate (Kesen District; and the cities of Rikuzentakata, Ōfunato and south portion of Kamaishi)
  - entire Miyagi

== Hokurikudō ==
- Wakasa
  - southern/western Fukui
- Echizen (broke off from Koshi during the end of the 7th century)
  - northern/eastern Fukui
- Kaga (created in 823 from Echizen)
  - southern/western Ishikawa
- Noto (created in 718 from Echizen, then occupied in 741 by Etchū, later re-split in 757 from Etchū)
  - northern/eastern Ishikawa
- Etchū (broke off from Koshi during the end of the 7th century)
  - entire Toyama
- Echigo (broke off from Koshi during the end of the 7th century)
  - entire Niigata (most)
- Sado (occupied in 743 by Echigo, later re-split in 752)
  - Sado city, Niigata

== San'indō ==
- Tanba
  - central/northeastern Hyōgo
  - central Kyoto
- Tango (created in 713 from Tamba)
  - northern Kyoto
- Tajima
  - northern/northwestern Hyōgo
- Inaba
  - eastern Tottori
- Hōki
  - western Tottori
- Izumo
  - eastern Shimane
- Iwami
  - western Shimane
- Oki
  - Oki District, Shimane

== San'yōdō ==
- Harima
  - southern/southwestern Hyōgo
- Mimasaka (created in 713 from Bizen)
  - northeastern Okayama
- Bizen (broke off from Kibi during the 2nd half of the 7th century)
  - southeastern Okayama
- Bitchū (broke off from Kibi during the 2nd half of the 7th century)
  - western Okayama
- Bingo (broke off from Kibi during the 2nd half of the 7th century)
  - eastern Hiroshima
- Aki
  - western Hiroshima
- Suō
  - eastern Yamaguchi
- Nagato
  - western Yamaguchi

== Nankaidō ==
- Kii
  - entire Wakayama
  - southern Mie
- Awaji
  - Awaji city, Hyōgo
- Awa
  - entire Tokushima
- Sanuki
  - entire Kagawa
- Iyo
  - entire Ehime
- Tosa
  - entire Kōchi

== Saikaidō ==
- Buzen (broke off from Toyo at the end of the 7th century)
  - northeastern Fukuoka Prefecture
  - northwestern Ōita Prefecture
- Bungo (broke off from Toyo at the end of the 7th century)
  - central/southeastern Ōita Prefecture (most)
- Chikuzen (broke off from Tsukushi no later than the end of the 7th century)
  - central/northwestern Fukuoka Prefecture (most)
- Chikugo (broke off from Tsukushi no later than the end of the 7th century)
  - southern Fukuoka Prefecture
- Hizen (broke off from Hi no later than the end of the 7th century)
  - entire Nagasaki (most)
  - entire Saga
- Higo (broke off from Hi no later than the end of the 7th century)
  - Kumamoto
- Hyūga
  - Miyazaki
- Ōsumi (created in 702 from Hyūga)
  - eastern Kagoshima
- Tane (created in 702 from Hyūga, later occupied in 824 by Ōsumi)
  - Kagoshima (Tanegashima and Yakushima Islands)
- Satsuma (created in 702 from Hyūga)
  - western Kagoshima
- Iki (officially Iki-shima)
  - Iki city, Nagasaki
- Tsushima (officially Tsushima-jima)
  - Tsushima city, Nagasaki

== Hokkaidō ==
- Oshima
  - southern Oshima Subprefecture
  - southern Hiyama Subprefecture
- Shiribeshi
  - most of Shiribeshi Subprefecture (excluding Abuta District)
  - northern Hiyama Subprefecture
- Iburi
  - entire Iburi Subprefecture
  - Yamakoshi District, in Oshima Subprefecture
  - Abuta District, in Shiribeshi Subprefecture
  - Chitose and Eniwa cities, in Ishikari Subprefecture
  - Shimukappu village, Kamikawa Subprefecture
- Ishikari
  - most of Ishikari Subprefecture (excluding Chitose and Eniwa cities)
  - entire Sorachi Subprefecture
  - southern Kamikawa Subprefecture (excluding Shimukappu village)
- Teshio
  - entire Rumoi Subprefecture
  - northern Kamikawa Subprefecture
- Kitami
  - entire Sōya Subprefecture
  - most of Abashiri Subprefecture (excluding part of Abashiri District)
- Hidaka
  - entire Hidaka Subprefecture
- Tokachi
  - entire Tokachi Subprefecture
- Kushiro
  - entire Kushiro Subprefecture
  - part of Abashiri District, in Abashiri Subprefecture
- Nemuro
  - entire Nemuro Subprefecture
- Chishima (the islands of Kunashiri and Etorofu, later included Shikotan and the Kuril Islands)
