= Gokishichidō =

Administrative units of ancient Japan

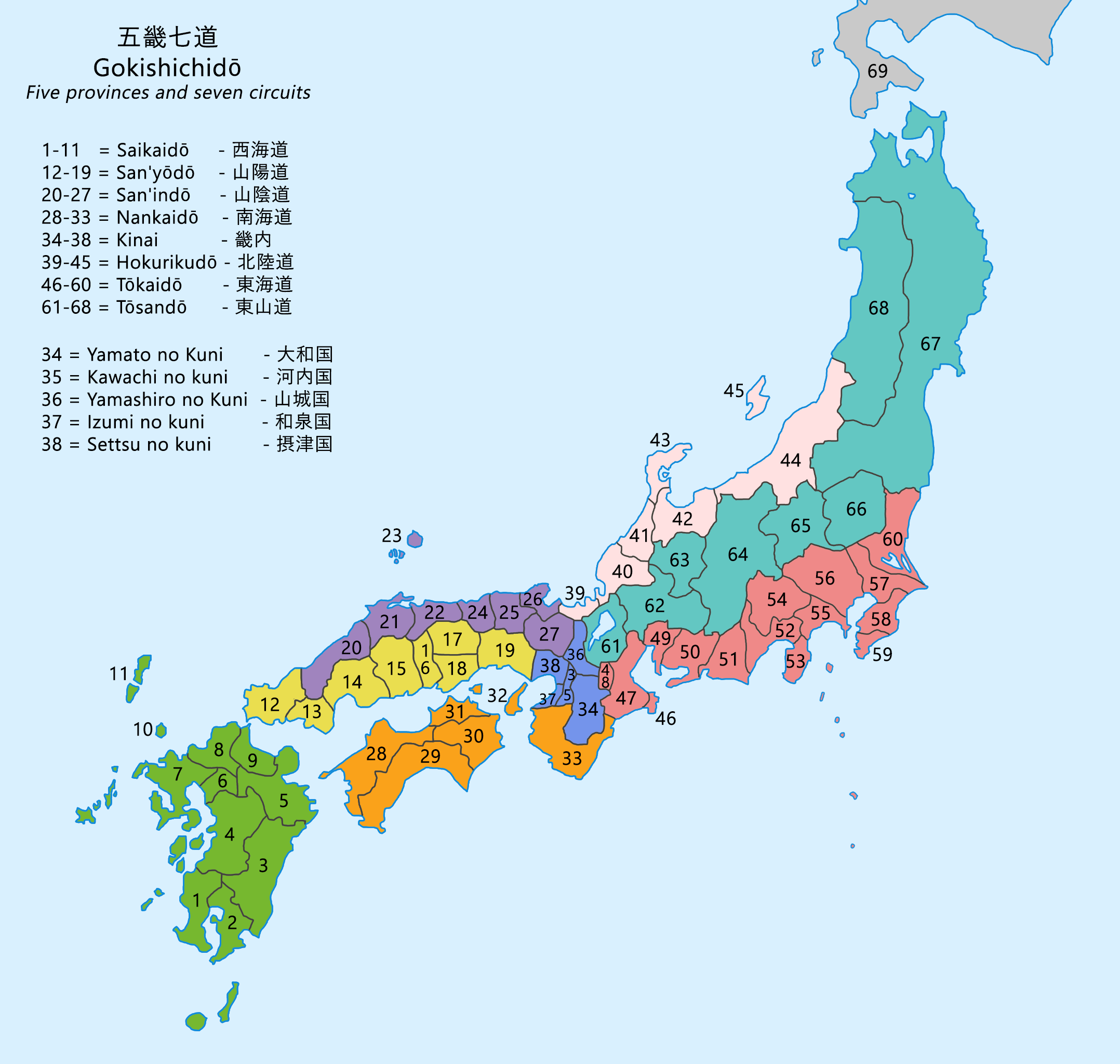
Regions in the 8th century (see below for modern Japanese prefectures)

Gokishichidō (五畿七道; "five provinces and seven circuits") was the name for ancient administrative units organized in Japan during the Asuka period (AD 538–710), as part of a legal and governmental system borrowed from the Chinese. Though these units did not survive as administrative structures beyond the Muromachi period (1336–1573), they did remain important geographical entities until the 19th century. The Gokishichidō consisted of five provinces in the Kinai (畿内) or capital region, plus seven dō (道) or circuits, each of which contained provinces of its own.

When Hokkaido was included as a circuit after the defeat of the Republic of Ezo in 1869, the system was briefly called Gokihachidō (五畿八道; "five provinces and eight circuits"). The abolition of the han system abolished the -han (early modern feudal domains) in 1871, -dō/circuits and provinces were per se not abolished by the abolition of domains; but the prefectures that sprang from the domains became the primary administrative division of the country and were soon merged and reorganized to territorially resemble provinces in many places. "Hokkai circuit" (Hokkai-dō) was the only -dō that would survive as administrative division, but it was later increasingly treated as "Hokkai prefecture" (Hokkai-dō); finally after WWII, the -dō was fully regarded as a prefecture: from 1946, the prefectures (until then only -fu/-ken) were legally referred to as -dō/-fu/-ken, from 1947 as -to/-dō/-fu/-ken.

== Five Provinces ==
The five Kinai provinces were local areas in and around the imperial capital (first Heijō-kyō at Nara, then Heian-kyō at Kyōto). They were:

- Izumi Province (now the southern part of Osaka Prefecture)
- Kawachi Province (now the southeastern part of Osaka Prefecture)
- Settsu Province (now the northern part of Osaka Prefecture, including the city of Osaka, and parts of Hyōgo Prefecture)
- Yamashiro Province (now the southern part of Kyōto Prefecture, including the city of Kyōto)
- Yamato Province (now Nara Prefecture)

== Seven Circuits ==
The seven dō or circuits were administrative areas stretching away from the Kinai region in different directions. Running through each of the seven areas was an actual road of the same name, connecting the imperial capital with all of the provincial capitals along its route. The seven dō were:

- Eastern sea circuit / Tōkaidō (running east along Japan's Pacific coast).
- Eastern mountains circuit / Tōsandō (northeast through the Japanese Alps).
- Northern land circuit / Hokurikudō (northeast along the Sea of Japan coast).
- Dark (Northern) mountains circuit / San'indō (west along the Sea of Japan coast).
- Light (Southern) mountains circuit / San'yōdō (west along the northern side of the Seto Inland Sea).
- Southern sea circuit / Nankaidō (south to the Kii Peninsula and the islands of Awaji and Shikoku).
- Western sea circuit / Saikaidō (the "western" island, Kyūshū).

== Gokaidō ==
The Gokishichidō roads should not be confused with the Edo Five Routes (五街道 Gokaidō), which were the five major roads leading to Edo during the Edo period (1603–1867). The Tōkaidō was one of the five routes, but the others were not.

== Regional perimeters ==
Many prefectures were merged and reorganized in the 1870s and 1880s to resemble provinces, so many modern prefectures can be assigned to an ancient circuit. For example, the Western provinces of the Tōkai circuit (Tōkai-dō) are now part of prefectures that are often grouped together as the Tōkai region (Tōkai-chihō). But there are still deviations, so that it is not comprehensively possible to describe circuits in terms of prefectures. For example, present-day Hyōgo in its borders since 1876 extends into five provinces (Harima, Tajima, Awaji, Settsu, Tamba) and thus into three circuits (San'yō, San'in, Nankai) as well as the ancient capital region.

A few Japanese regions, such as Hokuriku and San'yō, still retain their ancient Gokishichidō names. Other parts of Japan, namely Hokkaidō and the Ryukyu Islands, were not included in the Gokishichidō because they were not colonized by Japan until the 19th century, just as the Gokishichidō geographic divisions and the feudal han domains were being replaced with the modern system of prefectures. Initially the government tried to organize Hokkaidō as an eighth dō (hence the name), but it was soon consolidated into a single prefecture.

The seven ancient circuits and their modern (Meiji era) provinces. Hokkaidō and its provinces are not included.: Kinai / Tōkaidō / Tōsandō; Hokurikudō / San'indō / San'yōdō; Nankaidō / Saikaidō

== See also ==
- Comparison of past and present administrative divisions of Japan
- Provinces of Japan
- Station bell
