= Keno Province =

Former province of Japan

Keno Province (毛野国 or 毛国, Keno no kuni), also known as Kenu Province, is an old province of Japan prior to the Nara Period. Keno was located in the area of Tochigi Prefecture and Gumma Prefecture.

== History ==
Prior to the administrative reforms of the Taihō Code, Keno Province encompassed the area that subsequently would be divided into Kōzuke Province ("Upper Ke(no)," i.e. the part of Keno that was closer to the contemporary capital of Japan, equivalent to modern Gunma Prefecture) and Shimotsuke Province ("Lower Ke(no)," i.e. the part of Keno that was further from the capital, equivalent to modern Tochigi Prefecture). The name of this province is considered by some to be cognate with the name of the Kinu River, a major river of the North Kantō region that arises in the territory of ancient Keno Province.

== See also ==
- Ryōmō Line
- Tōbu Railway Ryōmō limited express
