= San'indō =

Pacific side of Chūgoku

San'indō.

San'indō (山陰道; Japanese pronunciation: [sä̀ɰ̃́.íǹ.dò̞ò̞, sä́ɰ̃́-]) is a Japanese geographical term. It means both an ancient division of the country and the main road running through it. San'in translates to "the shaded side of a mountain", while dō, depending on the context, can mean either a road, or a circuit, in the sense of delineating a region. This name derives from the idea that the northern side of the central mountain chain running through Honshū was the "shaded" side, while the southern side was the "sunny" (山陽 San'yō) side. The pre-modern region corresponds for the most part with the modern conception of the San'in region.

The region was established as one of the Gokishichidō (Five provinces and seven roads) during the Asuka period (538–710), and consisted of the following eight ancient provinces: Tanba, Tango, Tajima, Inaba, Hōki, Izumo, Iwami and Oki. However, this system gradually disappeared in the centuries leading up to the Muromachi period (1333–1467).

The San'indō, however, continued to be important, and highly trafficked through the Edo period (1603–1867). Running mostly east–west, its eastern terminus, along with those of most of the medieval highways (街道, kaidō), was at Kyoto. From there it followed the coast of the Sea of Japan to Hagi, near Shimonoseki, the western terminus of both the San'yōdō and the San'indō, and very near the westernmost end of the island of Honshū. Though the road originally terminated in the west at Hagi, the lords of Chōshū Domain at some point during the Edo period changed it to end at Yamaguchi.

The road served an important strategic and logistical role in a number of military situations over the course of the years. Ashikaga Takauji in the 14th century, Akechi Mitsuhide in the 16th century, and many others used it to flee from conflict, to return to the core of the country (kinai), or to move troops. Many daimyōs also used this road as part of their mandatory journeys (sankin-kōtai) to Edo under the Tokugawa shogunate. The road also served the more everyday purpose of providing transport for merchants, traveling entertainers, pilgrims and other commoners.

Today, Route 9, the San'in Expressway, and the San'in Main Line of the West Japan Railway Company follow the approximate route of the San'indō.

== Demographics ==
The San'indo subregion is a subregion of Chūgoku region that composes of the prefectures of Shimane, Tottori, and sometimes the northern portion of Yamaguchi Prefecture. The northern portion of Yamaguchi Prefecture composes of Abu, Hagi, and Nagato. The San'yo subregion is composed of the prefectures of Hiroshima, Okayama, and Yamaguchi in its entirety. The San'indo subregion is also known as San'in subregion.

Per Japanese census data, and, San'indo subregion has had continual negative population growth since 1992.

Historical population
Year	Pop.	±%
1920	1,170,000	—
1930	1,229,000	+5.0%
1940	1,225,000	−0.3%
1950	1,513,000	+23.5%
1960	1,488,000	−1.7%
1970	1,342,575	−9.8%
1980	1,388,795	+3.4%
1990	1,397,021	+0.6%
2000	1,374,792	−1.6%
2010	1,306,064	−5.0%
2020	1,240,143	−5.0%

== See also ==
- Comparison of past and present administrative divisions of Japan
- San'in Region
