= Toyo Province =

Former province of Japan

Toyo Province (豊国, Toyo-no kuni) was an ancient province of Japan, in the area of Buzen and Bungo Provinces. The ancient entity was located in modern Ōita Prefecture and northeastern Fukuoka Prefecture. It was divided into Buzen and Bungo in 683. It was sometimes called Hōshū (豊州).

Emperor Keikō is said to have made Unade rule Toyo province and gave him the surname Toyo-no-kuni-no-atai. This province is considered to have been under the control of the central government at an early stage.
