= Hi Province =

Former province of Japan

Hi Province (火国 or 肥国, Hi no kuni) was an ancient province of Japan, in the area of Hizen and Higo provinces. The ambit of this ancient entity is within Nagasaki, Saga and Kumamoto prefectures. It was sometimes called Hishū (肥州).
