= San'yōdō =

Seto Inland Sea side of Chūgoku

Coordinates: 34°30′N 133°25′E

San'yōdō

San'yōdō (山陽道; Japanese pronunciation: [sä̀ɰ̃́.jó̞ò̞.dò̞ò̞, sä́ɰ̃́-]) is a Japanese geographical term. It means both an ancient division of the country and the main road running through it. The San'yōdō corresponds for the most part with the modern conception of the San'yō region. This name derives from the idea that the southern side of the central mountain chain running through Honshū was the "sunny" side, while the northern side was the "shady" (山陰 San'in) side.

The region was established as one of the Gokishichidō (Five provinces and seven roads) during the Asuka period (538–710), and consisted of the following eight ancient provinces: Harima, Mimasaka, Bizen, Bitchū, Bingo, Aki, Suō and Nagato. However, this system gradually disappeared by the Muromachi period (1333–1467).

The San'yōdō, however, continued to be important, and highly trafficked through the Edo period (1603–1867). Running mostly east–west, its eastern terminus, along with those of most of the medieval highways (街道, kaidō), was at Kyoto. From there it ran west through Fushimi, Yodo, Yamazaki, and Hyōgo; from there it followed the coast of the Seto Inland Sea to Hagi, near Shimonoseki, the western terminus of both the San'yōdō and the San'indō, and very near the westernmost end of the island of Honshū. It ran a total of roughly 145 ri (approx. 350 miles).

As might be expected, the road served an important strategic and logistical role in a number of military situations over the course of the years. Emperor Go-Daigo in the 14th century, Toyotomi Hideyoshi in the 16th century, and many others used it to flee from conflict, to return to the core of the country (kinai), or to move troops. Many daimyō also used this road as part of their mandatory journeys (sankin kotai) to Edo under the Tokugawa shogunate. The road also served the more everyday purpose of providing transport for merchants, traveling entertainers, pilgrims and other commoners.

The modern national highway, Route 2, the San'yō Expressway, and the San'yō Main Line of the West Japan Railway Company, follow the approximate route of the San'yōdō.

== Demographics ==
The San'in subregion is a subregion of Chūgoku region that composes of the prefectures of Shimane, Tottori, and sometimes the northern portion of Yamaguchi Prefecture. The northern portion of Yamaguchi Prefecture composes of Abu, Hagi, and Nagato. The San'yodo subregion is a subregion of Chūgoku region and is composed of the prefectures of Hiroshima, Okayama, and Yamaguchi in its entirety. The San'yodo subregion is also known as San'yo subregion.

Per Japanese census data, and, San'yodo subregion has had positive population growth throughout the 20th century and negative population growth since the beginning of 21st century.

Historical population
Year	Pop.	±%
1920	3,801,000	—
1930	4,112,136	+8.2%
1940	4,492,504	+9.2%
1950	5,283,967	+17.6%
1960	5,456,043	+3.3%
1970	5,654,135	+3.6%
1980	6,197,161	+9.6%
1990	6,348,847	+2.4%
2000	6,357,707	+0.1%
2010	6,257,364	−1.6%
2020	6,079,644	−2.8%

== See also ==
- Comparison of past and present administrative divisions of Japan
- San'in
- San'indo
- San'yo
