= Saikaidō =

Historical region of Japan

Saikaidō

The Saikaidō (西海道; Japanese pronunciation: [sä̀í.kä́ì.dò̞ò̞], lit. 'Western Sea Circuit') is a Japanese geographical term. It means both an ancient division of the country and the main road running through it. Saikaido was one of the main circuits of the Gokishichidō system, which was originally established during the Asuka period.

This name identified the geographic region of Kyūshū and the islands of Tsushima and Iki. It consisted of nine ancient provinces and two islands. The provinces included Chikuzen, Chikugo, Buzen, Bungo, Hizen, Higo, Hyūga, Satsuma and Ōsumi.

== See also ==
- Comparison of past and present administrative divisions of Japan
