= Hokurikudō =

Administrative unit of ancient Japan

Hokurikudō.

Hokurikudō or Hokurokudō (北陸道; Japanese pronunciation: [hò̞.kɯ̈́.ɾʲí.kɯ̞̈́.dò̞ò̞, -ɾó̞-] lit. 'Northern Land Circuit') is a Japanese geographical term. It means both an ancient division of the country and the main road running through the old Japanese geographical region. Both were situated along the northwestern edge of Honshū. The name literally means 'North Land Way'. It also refers to a series of roads that connected the capitals (国府 kokufu) of each of the provinces that made up the region.

When the Gokishichidō system was initially established after the Taika reforms, it consisted of just two provinces: Wakasa and Koshi. During the reign of Emperor Temmu, Koshi was divided into three regions: Echizen, Etchū and Echigo and Sado Island was added as a fifth province. Later, Noto and Kaga were carved out of Echizen to form seven provinces in total.

The Hokuriku subregion of Chūbu region constitutes Hokurikudō region today.

== See also ==
- Comparison of past and present administrative divisions of Japan
- Hokuriku subregion
- Koshi Province
