= Tōkaidō (region) =

Administrative unit of ancient Japan

Tōkaidō

The Tōkaidō (東海道; Japanese pronunciation: [tò̞ó̞.kä́ì.dò̞ò̞, tó̞ó̞.kä́ì.dò̞ò̞, tó̞ò̞.kä̀ì.dò̞ò̞], lit. 'Eastern Sea Circuit') is a Japanese geographical term. It means both an ancient division of the country and the main road running through it. It is part of the Gokishichidō system.

The term also refers to a series of roads that connected the capitals (国府 kokufu) of each of the provinces that made up the region. The fifteen ancient provinces of the region include the following:

- Awa Province
- Hitachi Province
- Iga Province
- Ise Province
- Izu Province
- Kai Province
- Kazusa Province
- Mikawa Province
- Musashi Province
- Owari Province
- Sagami Province
- Shima Province
- Shimōsa Province
- Suruga Province
- Tōtōmi Province

In the Edo period, the Tōkaidō road (東海道, Eastern Ocean Road) was demonstrably the most important in Japan; and this marked prominence continued after the fall of the Tokugawa shogunate. In the early Meiji period, this region's eastern route was the one chosen for stringing the telegraph lines which connected the old capital city of Kyoto with the new "eastern capital" at Tokyo.

In the modern, post-Pacific War period, all measures show the Tōkaidō region increasing in its dominance as the primary center of population and employment.

== See also ==
- Comparison of past and present administrative divisions of Japan
