= Tōsandō =

Administrative unit of ancient Japan

Tosandō provinces in pink

Tōsandō (東山道; Japanese pronunciation: [tò̞ó̞.sä́ǹ.dò̞ò̞, tó̞ó̞-], lit. 'Eastern Mountain Circuit') is a Japanese geographical term. It means both an ancient division of the country and the main road running through it. It is part of the Gokishichidō system. It was situated along the central mountains of northern Honshu, specifically the Tōhoku region.

This term also refers to a series of roads that connected the capitals (国府, kokufu) of each of the provinces that made up the region.

The Tōsandō region encompasses eight ancient provinces.

- Dewa Province
- Hida Province
- Kōzuke Province
- Mino Province
- Mutsu Province
- Ōmi Province
- Shimotsuke Province
- Shinano Province

After 711 AD, Tōsandō was understood to include the Musashi Province.

== See also ==
- Comparison of past and present administrative divisions of Japan
- Nakasendō (post-Sekigahara Tōsandō)
- Sanriku, neighbouring region
