= Kinai =

Administrative unit of ancient Japan

Kinai is the pink area.

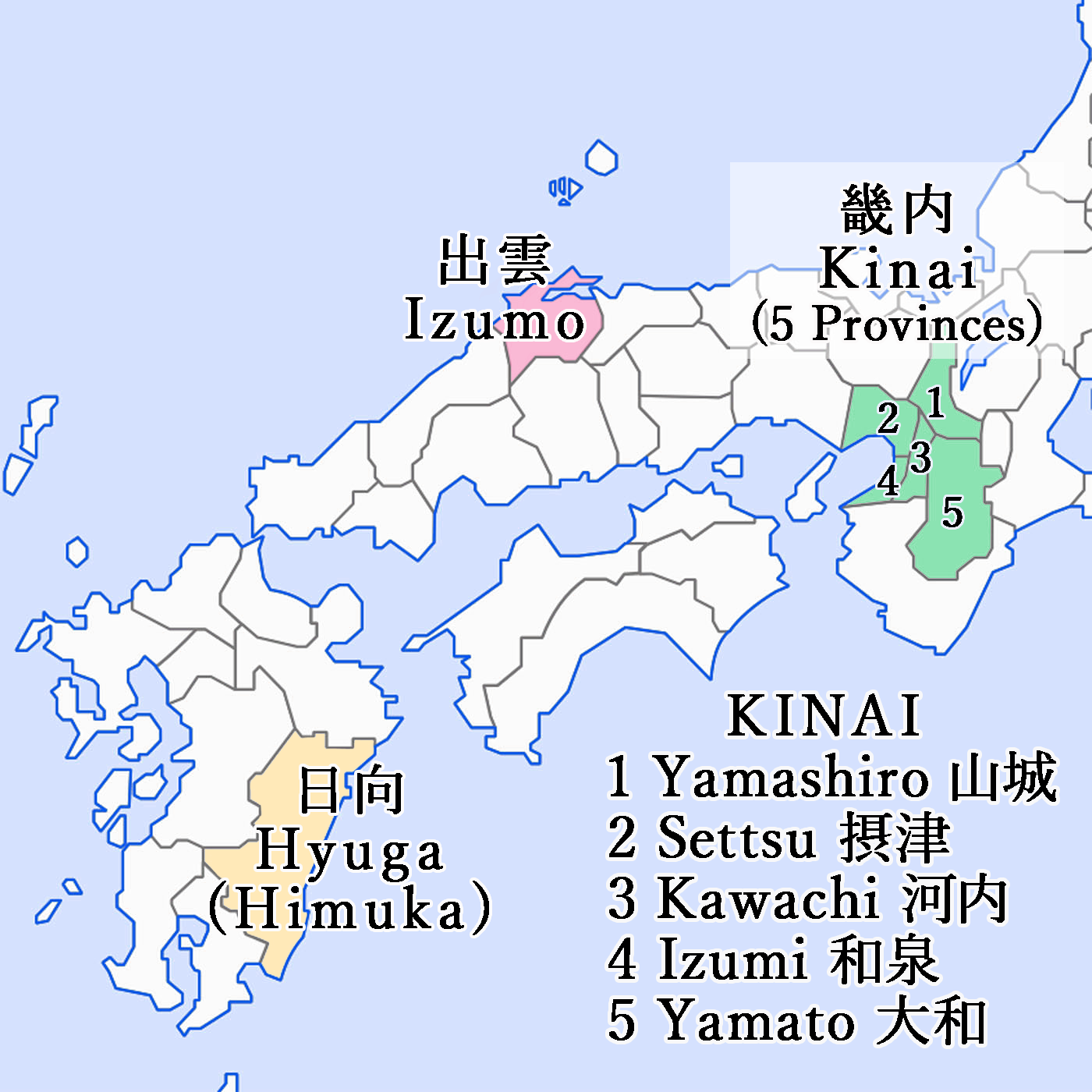
5 provinces in Kinai, Hyūga and Izumo

Kinai (畿内; Japanese pronunciation: [kʲiꜜ.nai]) is a Japanese term denoting an ancient division of the country. Kinai is a name for the provinces around the capital Nara and Heian-kyō.

The name is still used to describe part of the Kansai region, but the area of the Kinai corresponds only generally to the land of the old provinces.

The region was established as one of the Gokishichidō ("Five provinces and seven roads") during the Asuka period (538-710). It consisted of Yamashiro, Yamato, Settsu, Kawachi, and Izumi provinces.

== See also ==
- Comparison of past and present administrative divisions of Japan
- Kinki (近畿)
- Gyeonggi Province (京畿道)
