= Index of Japan-related articles (Y–Z) =

This page lists Japan-related articles with romanized titles beginning with the letters Y–Z. For names of people, please list by surname (i.e., "Tarō Yamada" should be listed under "Y", not "T"). Please also ignore particles (e.g. "a", "an", "the") when listing articles (i.e., "A City with No People" should be listed under "City").

== Ya ==
- Yabakei, Ōita
- Yabe, Fukuoka
- Yabe, Kumamoto
- Yachimata, Chiba
- Yachiyo, Chiba
- Yachiyo, Hyōgo
- Yaeyama District, Okinawa
- Yagi, Kyoto
- Yagi antenna
- Yagi Jūkichi
- Yagyū Jūbei Mitsuyoshi
- Yagyū Munenori
- Yaita, Tochigi
- Yaizu, Shizuoka
- Yakage, Okayama
- Yakiniku
- Yakisoba
- Yakitori
- Yaksha
- Yaku, Kagoshima
- Yakushi
- Yakushi-ji
- Yakushima
- Yakumo, Shimane
- Yakuno, Kyoto
- Yakushima White Pine
- Kōji Yakusho
- Yakult
- Yakuza
- Yakuza (video game)
- Yakuza film
- Yalta Conference
- Yama-uba
- Yamabe District, Nara
- Yamada, Fukuoka
- Yamada, Miyazaki
- Yoji Yamada
- Yamae, Kumamoto
- Yamaga, Kumamoto
- Yamaga, Ōita
- Yamagata, Gifu
- Yamagata, Iwate
- Yamagata, Nagano
- Yamagata, Yamagata
- Yamagata Aritomo
- Yamagata District, Hiroshima
- Hiro Yamagata
- Yamagata Prefecture
- Yamagawa, Kagoshima
- Yamaguchi Prefecture
- Yamaguchi, Yamaguchi
- Yamaguchi-gumi
- Kappei Yamaguchi
- Kristi Yamaguchi
- Makoto Yamaguchi
- Yamaha Corporation
- Yamaha DSP-1
- Yamaha DX7
- Yamaha Motor Company
- Yamaha YM2149
- Yamaha YM3812
- Yamaichi Securities
- Mika Yamaji
- Yamakawa, Fukuoka
- Yamakawa, Tokushima
- Yamakuni, Ōita
- Yamamoto Gonnohyōe
- Isoroku Yamamoto
- Yamamoto Tsunetomo
- Yamamoto, Kagawa
- Bochō Yamamura
- Sadao Yamanaka
- Yamanashi, Yamanashi
- Yamanashi Prefecture
- Michiru Yamane
- Yamanote Line
- Yamanokuchi, Miyazaki
- Yamaoka, Gifu
- Yamasaki, Hyōgo
- Minoru Yamasaki
- Yamashiro, Kyoto
- Yamashiro, Tokushima
- Yamashiro Province
- Tomoyuki Yamashita
- Yamashita's gold
- Yamata no Orochi
- Yamataka Eye
- Yamate
- Yamate, Okayama
- Yamato, Fukuoka
- Yamato, Fukushima
- Yamato, Gifu
- Yamato, Ibaraki
- Yamato, Kagoshima
- Yamato, Kanagawa
- Yamato, Niigata
- Yamato, Saga
- Yamato, Yamaguchi
- Yamato, Yamanashi
- Yamato 1
- Yamato-class battleship
- Yamato District, Fukuoka
- Yamato people
- Yamato period
- Yamato Takeru
- Yamato Province
- Yamato Transport
- Waki Yamato
- Yamatokoriyama, Nara
- Yamatoji Line
- Yamatotakada, Nara
- Yamauchi, Saga
- Yamauchi, Shunyo
- Hiroshi Yamauchi
- Yamazaki Maso
- Naoko Yamazaki
- Tsutomu Yamazaki
- Yamazoe, Nara
- Yame District, Fukuoka
- Yame, Fukuoka
- Yamcha
- Yami to Bōshi to Hon no Tabibito
- Yanadani, Ehime
- Yanagawa, Fukuoka
- Kunio Yanagita
- Yanahara, Okayama
- Yanai, Yamaguchi
- Masaru Yanagisawa
- Shinsaku Yanai
- Yanaizu, Gifu
- Akiko Yano
- Yao, Osaka
- Yao Airport
- Yaohan
- Yaoi
- Yaotsu, Gifu
- Yari
- Yasaka, Shimane
- Yashima-ji
- Yashimajinumi
- Yashima no Hage-tanuki
- Yashio, Saitama
- Yashiro, Hyōgo
- Miyagawa Yashukichi
- Yasu District, Shiga
- Yasu, Fukuoka
- Yasu, Kōchi
- Yasu, Shiga
- Yasuda, Kōchi
- Yasugi, Shimane
- Nakaji Yasui
- Yasukuni Shrine
- Yasutomi, Hyōgo
- Yasuura, Hiroshima
- Yatomi, Aichi
- Yatsuka District, Shimane
- Yatsuka, Okayama
- Yatsuka, Shimane
- Yatsushiro District, Kumamoto
- Yatsushiro, Kumamoto
- Yawara, Ibaraki
- Yawata, Kyoto
- Yawatahama, Ehime
- Yayoi, Ōita
- Yayoi, Tokyo
- Yayoi period
- Ai Yazawa
- Yazu District, Tottori

== Ye ==
- Yellow Magic Orchestra

== Yk ==
- YKK Group

== Yo ==
- Yobuko, Saga
- Yodo River
- Yodoe, Tottori
- Yodoya Saburōemon
- Yogo, Shiga
- Yojimbo (film)
- Yokaichi, Shiga
- Yōkaichiba, Chiba
- Yokawa, Hyōgo
- Yokkaichi, Mie
- Yokogawa, Kagoshima
- Yokohama F. Marinos
- Yokohama National University
- Yokohama Municipal Subway
- Yokohama, Kanagawa
- Gunpei Yokoi
- Shoichi Yokoi
- Yokoi Shonan
- Riichi Yokomitsu
- Yokoshima, Kumamoto
- Yokosuka D4Y
- Yokosuka MXY8
- Yokosuka MXY9
- Yokosuka, Kanagawa
- Yokota Air Base
- Yokota, Shimane
- Yokote, Akita
- Yomi
- Yomitan, Okinawa
- Yomiuri Giants
- Yomiuri Shimbun
- Yonabaru, Okinawa
- Yonago, Tottori
- Yonaguni, Okinawa
- Mitsumasa Yonai
- Yonashiro, Okinawa
- Yoneda lemma
- Yonezawa, Yamagata
- Yonōzu, Ōita
- Odai Yorisada
- Yorishima, Okayama
- Yoriyuki Arima
- Yoro District, Gifu
- Yōrō, Gifu
- Yoron, Kagoshima
- Yosa District, Kyoto
- Yosano Akiko
- Yoshi
- Yoshi (video game)
- Yoshi's Cookie
- Yoshi's Island
- Yoshi's Safari
- Yoshida, Ehime
- Yoshida, Kagoshima
- Yoshida, Shimane
- Yoshida, Shizuoka
- Yoshida Kanetomo
- Yoshida Kenkō
- Mitsuru Yoshida
- Shigeru Yoshida
- Yoshida Shintō
- Yoshida Shōin
- Soyoka Yoshida
- Jiro Yoshihara
- Yoshii, Fukuoka
- Yoshii, Gunma
- Yoshii, Nagasaki
- Yoshii, Okayama (Akaiwa)
- Yoshii, Okayama (Shitsuki)
- Yoshii Isamu
- Yoshijirō Umezu
- Yoshikawa, Kōchi
- Yoshikawa, Saitama
- Eiji Yoshikawa
- Takeo Yoshikawa
- Yoshiki District, Gifu
- Yoshiki District, Yamaguchi
- Yoshimatsu, Kagoshima
- Yoshimichi Hara
- Banana Yoshimoto
- Yoshinaga, Okayama
- Yoshino, Nara
- Yoshino, Tokushima
- Yoshino District, Nara
- Yoshino Province
- Sakuzō Yoshino
- Yoshinogen
- Yoshinoya
- Yoshitomi, Fukuoka
- Yoshitoshi
- Yoshiumi, Ehime
- Yoshiwara
- Eisuke Yoshiyuki
- Yoshokai
- Yotsuba&!
- Yotsukaidō, Chiba
- You're Under Arrest (manga)
- Yōkai
- Yoyogi Station

== Ys ==
- Ys (series)

== Yu ==
- Yu-Gi-Oh!
- Yuasa, Wakayama
- Yubara, Okayama
- Yūbari, Hokkaidō
- Yufuin, Ōita
- Yuge, Ehime
- Yui, Shizuoka
- Yukata
- Hideki Yukawa
- Yukawa potential
- Yūki, Ibaraki
- Yuki, Hiroshima (Jinseki)
- Yuki, Hiroshima (Saeki)
- Yuki, Tokushima
- Yuki-onna
- Keiko Yukimura
- Satsuki Yukino
- Isao Yukisada
- Yukuhashi, Fukuoka
- Yume de Aetara (manga)
- Yume de Aetara (song)
- Yumeno Kyūsaku
- Yumesaki, Hyōgo
- Yumi
- Yunokawa Onsen (Hokkaido)
- Yunomae, Kumamoto
- Yunotsu, Shimane
- Yura, Wakayama
- Yūrakuchō Station
- Yūrei
- Yuri (genre)
- Yurikamome
- Yusuhara, Kōchi
- Yutaka, Hiroshima
- Yuto, Shizuoka
- Yuu, Yamaguchi
- Yuya, Yamaguchi
- Yuyama
- YuYu Hakusho
- Yuzawa, Akita
- Yuzawa, Niigata
- Yuzu Nembutsu

== Z ==
- Zaibatsu
- Camp Zama
- Zama, Kanagawa
- Zamami, Okinawa
- Zanbatō
- Zangief
- Zapdos
- Zarigani
- Zaru
- Zazen
- Zeebra
- Zelda II: The Adventure of Link
- Zen
- Zen Teacher/Zen Master
- Zendo
- Zeni
- Zengakuren
- Zenjibu-ji
- Zenkō-ji
- Zenkō-ji (Gifu)
- Zenshō-an
- Zenshūyō
- Zensui-ji
- Zentsūji, Kagawa
- Zeon
- Zero Wing
- Zeta Gundam
- Zoids
- Zōjō-ji
- Zone (band)
- Zōri
- Zhu Bajie
- Zuntata
- Zushi, Kanagawa
