= Hyōgo 11th district =

Legislative district of Japan

Hyōgo 11th District
- Parliamentary constituency for the Japanese House of Representatives
- Numbered map of Hyōgo Prefecture single-member districts
- Prefecture: Hyōgo
- Proportional District: Kinki
- Electorate: 399,004

Current constituency
- Created: 1994
- Seats: One
- Party: Liberal Democratic
- Representative: Motoyasu Yamada
- Municipalities: Part of Himeji

Hyogo 11th district (兵庫県第11区 Hyōgo-ken dai-jūikku or simply 兵庫11区 Hyōgo 11-ku) is a constituency of the House of Representatives in the Diet of Japan. It is located in Southwestern Hyōgo and is based on the 1995 borders of the city of Himeji; the former towns of Ieshima, Yumesaki, Kōdera and Yasutomi that merged into Himeji in 2006 are part of the 12th district. As of September 2015, 387,509 eligible voters were registered in the district.

== Outline ==
Before the electoral reform of 1994, the area formed part of Hyōgo 4th district where four Representatives had been elected by single non-transferable vote.

The district has been previously represented by: Tōru Toida of the Liberal Democratic Party, the son of former representative and health minister Saburō Toida, and Takeaki Matsumoto, formerly of the Democratic Party of Japan, son of former representative and defense minister Jūrō Matsumoto and great-great-grandson of former prime minister Hirobumi Itō.

== List of representatives ==
Election	Representative	Party	Notes
1996	Tōru Toida	Liberal Democratic	
2000	Takeaki Matsumoto	Democratic	
2003	Takeaki Matsumoto	Democratic	
2005	Tōru Toida	Liberal Democratic	
2009	Takeaki Matsumoto	Democratic	
2012	Takeaki Matsumoto	Democratic	
2014	Takeaki Matsumoto	Democratic	
2017	Takeaki Matsumoto	Liberal Democratic	
2021	Takeaki Matsumoto	Liberal Democratic	
2024	Takeaki Matsumoto	Liberal Democratic	
2026	Motoyasu Yamada	Liberal Democratic	

== Election results ==
2026
Party	Candidate	Votes	%	±%
LDP	Motoyasu Yamada	86,090	43.5	▼5.0
Ishin	Hiroki Sumiyoshi (elected in Kinki PR block)	55,757	28.2	▼4.0
DPP	Tatsuki Nakahara	23,900	12.1	
Sanseitō	Satoshi Yamashita	18,437	9.3	▼0.5
JCP	Kazushige Nigauri	13,712	6.9	▼2.5
Registered electors		393,587		
Turnout			52.38	▲4.06
LDP hold				

2024
Party	Candidate	Votes	%	±%
LDP	Takeaki Matsumoto (Incumbent) (endorsed by Komeito	89,943	48.53	▼0.47
Ishin	Hiroki Sumiyoshi	59,738	32.23	▼9.07
Sanseitō	Satoshi Yamashita	18,261	9.85	New
JCP	Kazushige Nigauri	17,397	9.39	▼0.31
Turnout		185,339	48.32	▼0.07
LDP hold				

2021
Party	Candidate	Votes	%	±%
Liberal Democratic	Takeaki Matsumoto (Incumbent)	92,761	49.03	
Innovation	Hiroki Sumiyoshi (elected in Kinki PR block)	78,082	41.27	New
Communist	Hiroyuki Ohta	18,363	9.71	
Registered electors		399,029		
Turnout			48.39	▲4.88
LDP hold				

2017
Party	Candidate	Votes	%	±%
Liberal Democratic	Takeaki Matsumoto (Incumbent)	109,381	65.29	
Kibō no Tō	Takashi Nagayasu	37,783	22.55	New
Communist	Satoru Inamura	20,355	12.15	
Registered electors		398,434		
Turnout			43.51	
LDP hold				

=== 2014 general election ===
The 47th election for the House of Representatives held in December 2014 saw Takeaki Matsumoto retain the district for the Democratic Party by once again defeating the LDP candidate Nobuhide Zushi. It was Matsumoto's third consecutive win and he is currently serving his fifth term as the district's representative and his sixth consecutive term in the House of Representatives. Zushi was officially endorsed by Komeito, the LDP's junior coalition partner.

2014
Party	Candidate	Votes	%	±%
Democratic	Takeaki Matsumoto	90,182	49.6	10.0
LDP	Nobuhide Zushi	74,562	41.0	9.4
JCP	Kazushige Nigauri	17,020	9.4	3.4
Turnout				

=== 2012 general election ===
The 46th election for the House of Representatives saw Takeaki Matsumoto retain the district by defeating the LDP's candidate, newcomer Nobuhide Zushi. Matsumoto was one of a minority of DPJ members to retain his seat as the party was swept from power, losing 174 of its 231 seats in a landslide victory to the LDP led by former Prime Minister Shinzo Abe. Matsumoto was officially endorsed by the DPJ's coalition partner, the People's New Party, while Zushi was endorsed by Komeito. This election saw the rise of the Japan Restoration Party, which won 54 seats in the election. The party's candidate in Hyogo 11th, company director Sōichirō Katada, was endorsed by Your Party.

2012
Party	Candidate	Votes	%	±%
Democratic	Takeaki Matsumoto	80,760	39.6	−21.7
LDP	Nobuhide Zushi	64,509	31.6	−4.6
Restoration	Sōichirō Katada	46,462	22.8	22.8
JCP	Midori Shirakami	12,304	6.0	6.0
Turnout				

=== Earlier elections ===
2009
Party	Candidate	Votes	%	±%
Democratic	Takeaki Matsumoto	146,058	61.3	14.8
LDP	Tōru Toida	86,203	36.2	−11.3
Happiness Realization	Tomoko Bōda	6,013	2.5	2.5
Turnout		243,796	63.95	−0.5

2005
Party	Candidate	Votes	%	±%
LDP	Tōru Toida	113,401	47.5	5.9
Democratic	Takeaki Matsumoto Elected to Kinki PR block	110,966	46.5	−6.1
JCP	Noriaki Takeuchi	14,441	6.0	0.2
Turnout		242,650	64.45	5.94

2003
Party	Candidate	Votes	%	±%
Democratic	Takeaki Matsumoto	112,898	52.6	5.2
LDP	Tōru Toida	89,159	41.6	0.7
JCP	Noriaki Takeuchi	12,494	5.8	−2.6
Turnout		219,263	58.51	

2000
Party	Candidate	Votes	%	±%
Democratic	Takeaki Matsumoto	101,566	47.4	33.1
LDP	Tōru Toida	87,624	40.9	8.1
JCP	Kazuya Koike	18,056	8.4	0.3
Liberal League	Chiaki Hattori	7,119	3.3	3.3

1996
Party	Candidate	Votes	%	±%
LDP	Tōru Toida	64,896	32.8	
New Frontier	Takeshi Gotō	61,185	30.9	
Democratic	Shigeru Gotō	28,303	14.3	
Independent	Takeaki Matsumoto	27,371	13.8	
JCP	Katsumi Nankō	15,970	8.1	

== See also ==
- Hyogo at-large district - the multi-member district representing Hyogo Prefecture in the House of Councillors
