= Ichinomiya, Hyōgo (Shisō) =

Former town in Hyōgo Prefecture, Japan

Ichinomiya (一宮町, Ichinomiya-chō) was a town located in Shisō District, Hyōgo Prefecture, Japan. The name, Ichinomiya, means "the first shrine" of the province, referring to the Iwa Shrine of the Harima Province.

As of 2003, the town had an estimated population of 10,236 and a density of 47.85 persons per km^{2}. The total area was 213.93 km^{2}.

On April 1, 2005, Ichinomiya, along with the towns of Chikusa, Haga and Yamasaki (all from Shisō District), was merged to create the city of Shisō and no longer exists as an independent municipality.
