= Shisō =

Shisō 宍粟市
- City
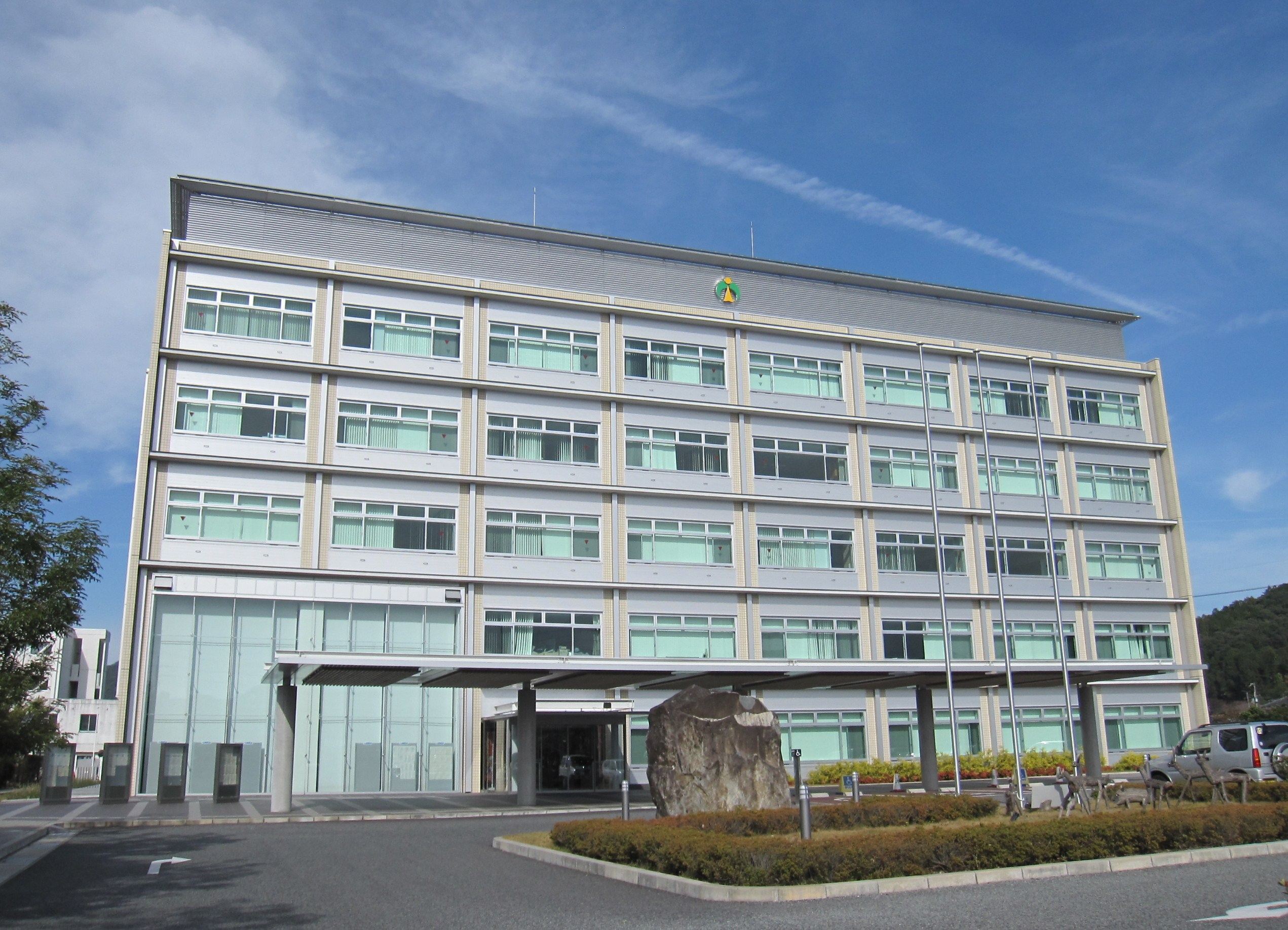
- Shiso City Hall

- Flag Emblem
- Coordinates: 35°0′N 134°33′E
- Country: Japan
- Region: Kansai
- Prefecture: Hyōgo

Government
  - Mayor: Shouzou Fukumoto

Area
  - Total: 658.54 km^{2} (254.26 sq mi)

Population (May 1, 2022)
  - Total: 35,639
  - Density: 54.118/km^{2} (140.17/sq mi)
- Time zone: UTC+09:00 (JST)
- City hall address: 133-6 Nakahirose, Yamasaki-cho, Shisō-shi, Hyōgo-ken 671-2593
- Climate: Cfa
- Website: Official website
- Symbols
- Flower: Lilium japonicum
- Tree: Fagus crenata

Shisō (宍粟市, Shisō-shi) is a city in Hyōgo Prefecture, Japan. As of 31 May 2022, the city had an estimated population of 35,639 in 14694 households and a population density of 110 persons per km². The total area of the city is 658.54 square kilometres (254.26 sq mi).

== Geography ==
Shisō is located in the midwestern part of Hyōgo Prefecture, about 100 kilometers from Kobe and about 30 km from Himeji, bordering Okayama Prefecture in the west and Tottori Prefecture in the north. The city area extends for 32 kilometer east-west and 42 kilometers north-south, and has the second largest area in the prefecture after Toyooka, but the population density is low because most of the city area is mountainous. The main rivers are the Ibo River and the Chikusa River. The Ibo River flows south to Himeji.

=== Neighbouring municipalities ===
Hyōgo Prefecture

- Asago
- Himeji
- Kamikawa
- Sayō
- Tatsuno
- Yabu

Okayama Prefecture

- Nishiawakura

Tottori Prefecture

- Wakasa

=== Climate ===
Shisō has a humid subtropical climate (Köppen climate classification Cfa) with hot summers and cool to cold winters. Precipitation is significantly higher in summer than in winter, though on the whole lower than most parts of Honshū, and there is no significant snowfall. The average annual temperature in Shisō is 13.8 °C (56.8 °F). The average annual rainfall is 1,805.4 mm (71.08 in) with July as the wettest month. The temperatures are highest on average in August, at around 25.8 °C (78.4 °F), and lowest in January, at around 2.4 °C (36.3 °F). The highest temperature ever recorded in Shisō was 38.5 °C (101.3 °F) on 4 August 2018; the coldest temperature ever recorded was −11.7 °C (10.9 °F) on 28 February 1981.

Climate data for Shisō (1991−2020 normals, extremes 1978−present)
Month	Jan	Feb	Mar	Apr	May	Jun	Jul	Aug	Sep	Oct	Nov	Dec	Year
Record high °C (°F)	18.1 (64.6)	20.7 (69.3)	25.4 (77.7)	29.5 (85.1)	32.6 (90.7)	35.2 (95.4)	38.0 (100.4)	38.5 (101.3)	35.8 (96.4)	31.5 (88.7)	25.4 (77.7)	20.9 (69.6)	38.5 (101.3)
Mean daily maximum °C (°F)	7.4 (45.3)	8.6 (47.5)	12.8 (55.0)	18.9 (66.0)	23.7 (74.7)	26.5 (79.7)	30.0 (86.0)	31.8 (89.2)	27.5 (81.5)	21.9 (71.4)	15.9 (60.6)	10.0 (50.0)	19.6 (67.2)
Daily mean °C (°F)	2.4 (36.3)	3.1 (37.6)	6.6 (43.9)	12.1 (53.8)	17.1 (62.8)	21.0 (69.8)	24.9 (76.8)	25.8 (78.4)	21.9 (71.4)	15.9 (60.6)	9.9 (49.8)	4.7 (40.5)	13.8 (56.8)
Mean daily minimum °C (°F)	−1.1 (30.0)	−0.9 (30.4)	1.5 (34.7)	6.1 (43.0)	11.4 (52.5)	16.6 (61.9)	21.3 (70.3)	22.0 (71.6)	18.0 (64.4)	11.5 (52.7)	5.5 (41.9)	0.9 (33.6)	9.4 (48.9)
Record low °C (°F)	−8.6 (16.5)	−11.7 (10.9)	−6.6 (20.1)	−2.9 (26.8)	0.5 (32.9)	6.7 (44.1)	13.6 (56.5)	14.0 (57.2)	6.4 (43.5)	0.7 (33.3)	−2.5 (27.5)	−7.6 (18.3)	−11.7 (10.9)
Average precipitation mm (inches)	72.9 (2.87)	80.2 (3.16)	132.9 (5.23)	136.6 (5.38)	181.3 (7.14)	215.4 (8.48)	283.0 (11.14)	190.4 (7.50)	230.1 (9.06)	133.5 (5.26)	76.8 (3.02)	77.8 (3.06)	1,805.4 (71.08)
Average precipitation days (≥ 1.0 mm)	10.2	10.6	11.7	10.4	10.7	12.6	13.0	10.5	10.6	8.2	7.8	9.7	126
Mean monthly sunshine hours	99.1	104.7	150.8	186.3	201.2	145.7	150.1	185.5	138.8	151.1	128.0	113.2	1,755.6
Source: Japan Meteorological Agency

=== Demographics ===
Per Japanese census data, the population of Shisō in 2020 is 34,819 people. Shisō has been conducting censuses since 1920.

Historical population

Year	Pop.	±%
1920	47,657	—
1925	47,760	+0.2%
1930	48,893	+2.4%
1935	48,357	−1.1%
1940	48,492	+0.3%
1945	59,217	+22.1%
1950	60,289	+1.8%
1955	58,655	−2.7%
1960	54,590	−6.9%
1965	50,889	−6.8%
1970	48,558	−4.6%

Year	Pop.	±%
1975	48,791	+0.5%
1980	49,084	+0.6%
1985	48,980	−0.2%
1990	48,454	−1.1%
1995	47,685	−1.6%
2000	45,460	−4.7%
2005	43,302	−4.7%
2010	40,945	−5.4%
2015	37,773	−7.7%
2020	34,819	−7.8%

Shisō population statistics

== History ==
The area of Shisō was part of ancient Harima Province and the Yamasaki neighborhood of the city developed as a node between the ancient San'yōdō and San'indō and the Inaba Kaidō highways. The area was also known for its production of tatara steel, often used in the production of Japanese swords. The presence of Iwa Shrine, the ichinomiya of Harima Province indicates that this was the ancient center of Harima. During the Edo Period, Yamasaki Domain under a cadet branch of the Honda clan ruled a portion of the territory. In 1871, following the Meiji restoration, the area became part of Shisō District, Hyōgo and the town of Yamasaki was established with the creation of the modern municipalities system. The city of Shisō was established on April 1, 2005, from the merger of the four towns of Shisō District: Chikusa, Haga, Ichinomiya, and Yamasaki.

== Government ==
Shisō has a mayor-council form of government with a directly elected mayor and a unicameral city council of 16 members. Shisō contributes one member to the Hyogo Prefectural Assembly. In terms of national politics, the city is part of Hyōgo 12th district of the lower house of the Diet of Japan.

== Economy ==
Shisō has mostly a rural economy based on forestry and agriculture.

== Education ==
Shisō has twelve public elementary schools and seven public middle schools operated by the city government and three public high schools operated by the Hyōgo Prefectural Department of Education. There is also one private high school.

== Transportation ==
=== Railway ===
Shisō does not have any passenger railway services.

=== Highways ===
- Chūgoku Expressway
- National Route 29
- National Route 429

== Sister cities ==
- Sequim, Washington, United States, since November 4, 2005

== Gallery ==
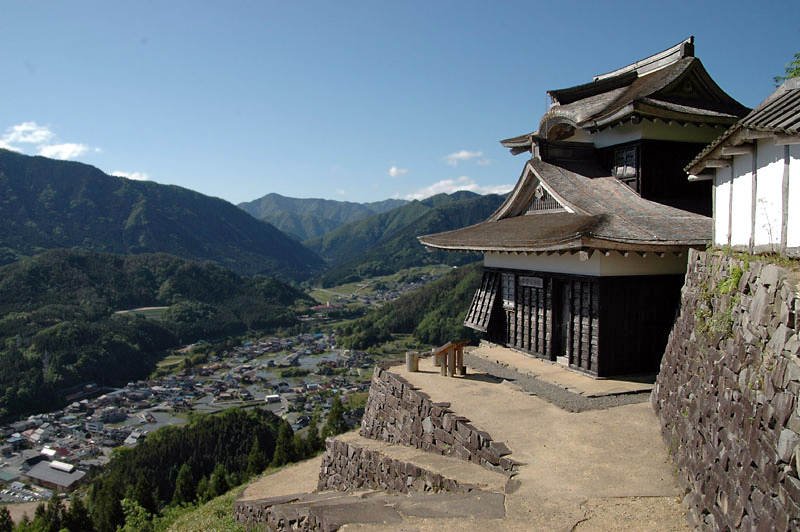
Haga Castle

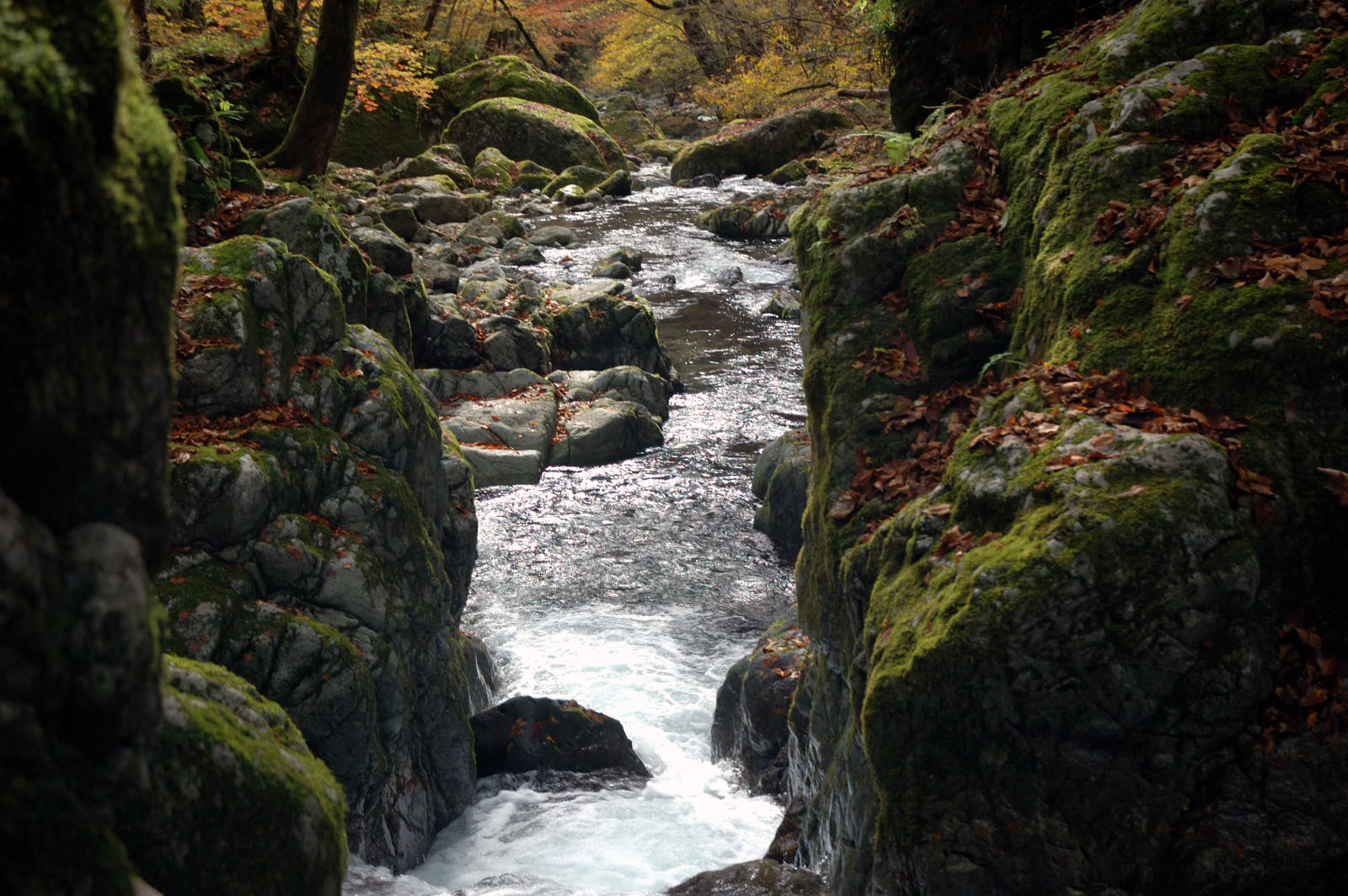
Onzui Ravine

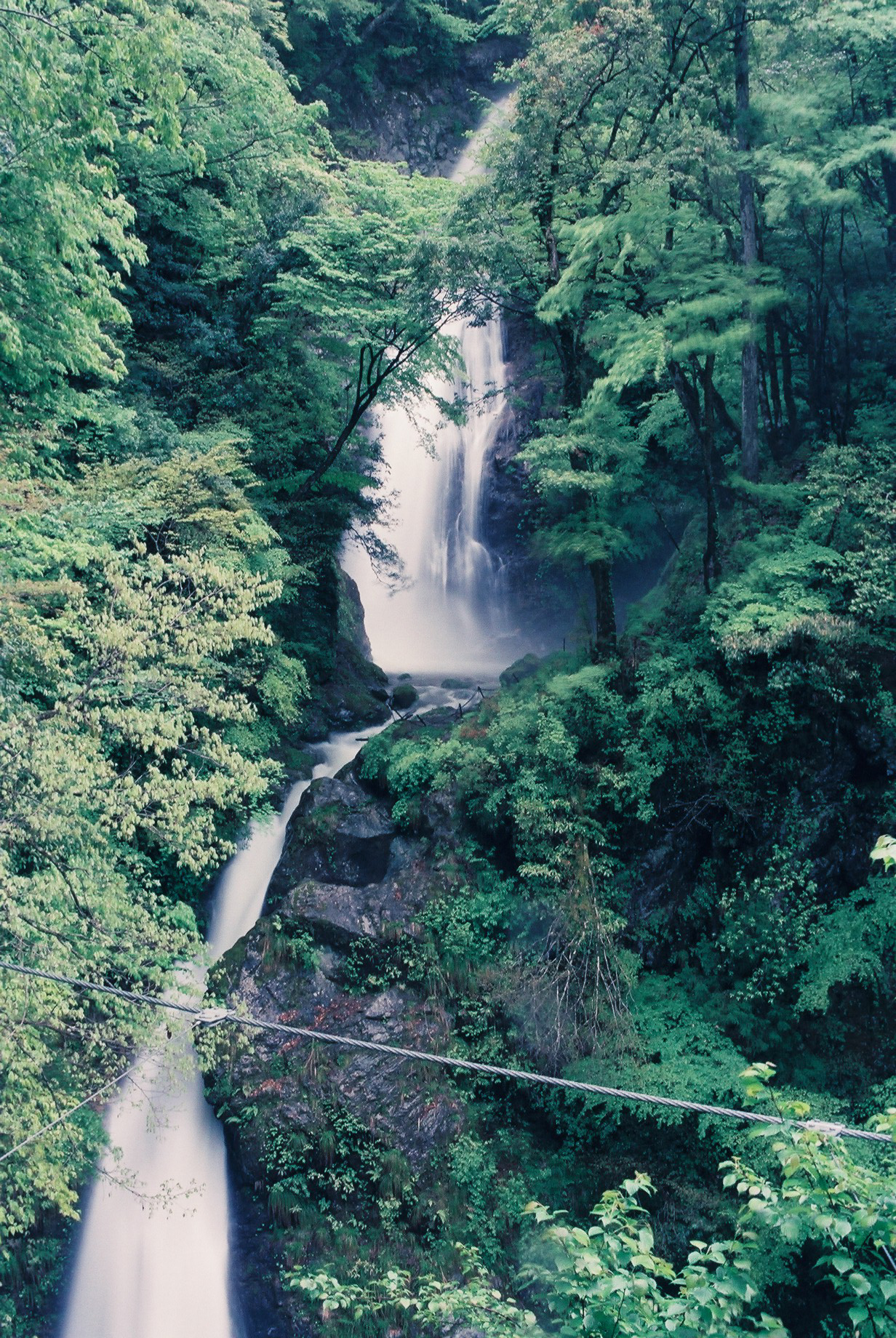
Harafudo Falls

== Local attractions ==
- Banshu Yamasaki Iris Garden
- Iwa Shrine, the ichinomiya of former Harima Province
