= Shinsaku =

- Gender: Male

Origin
- Origin: Japanese
- Meaning: Different meanings depending on the kanji used

Shinsaku (written: 伸作, 晋作 or 新作) is a masculine Japanese given name. Notable people with the name include:

- Shinsaku Enomoto (榎本 新作; born 1998), Japanese basketball player
- Shinsaku Maeda (前田 新作; born 1952), Japanese golfer
- Shinsaku Mochidome (持留 新作; born 1988), Japanese footballer
- Takasugi Shinsaku (高杉 晋作; 1839–1867), Japanese samurai
- Shinsaku Tsukawaki (塚脇 伸作; 1931–1993), Japanese gymnast
- Shinsaku Uesugi (上杉 晋作; born 1991), Japanese chess player
- Shinsaku Yanai (柳内 伸作; born 1947), Japanese writer and Japan Ground Self-Defense Force officer

== See also ==
- 9076 Shinsaku, a main-belt asteroid
