= Yamasaki Domain =

Japanese feudal domain located in Harima Province

Yamasaki Domain 山崎藩
- under Tokugawa shogunate Japan
- 1615–1871
- Capital: Yamasaki jin'ya
- Area
  - Coordinates: 35°00′10.6″N 134°32′22.4″E
  - Type: Daimyō
- Historical era: Edo period
  - Established: 1615
  - 1615: Ikeda clan
  - 1640: Matsui-Matsudaira clan
  - 1649: Ikeda clan
  - 1678: Honda clan
  - Disestablished: 1871
- Today part of: part of Hyōgo Prefecture

Location of Yamasaki jin'ya
Yamasaki Domain (Japan)

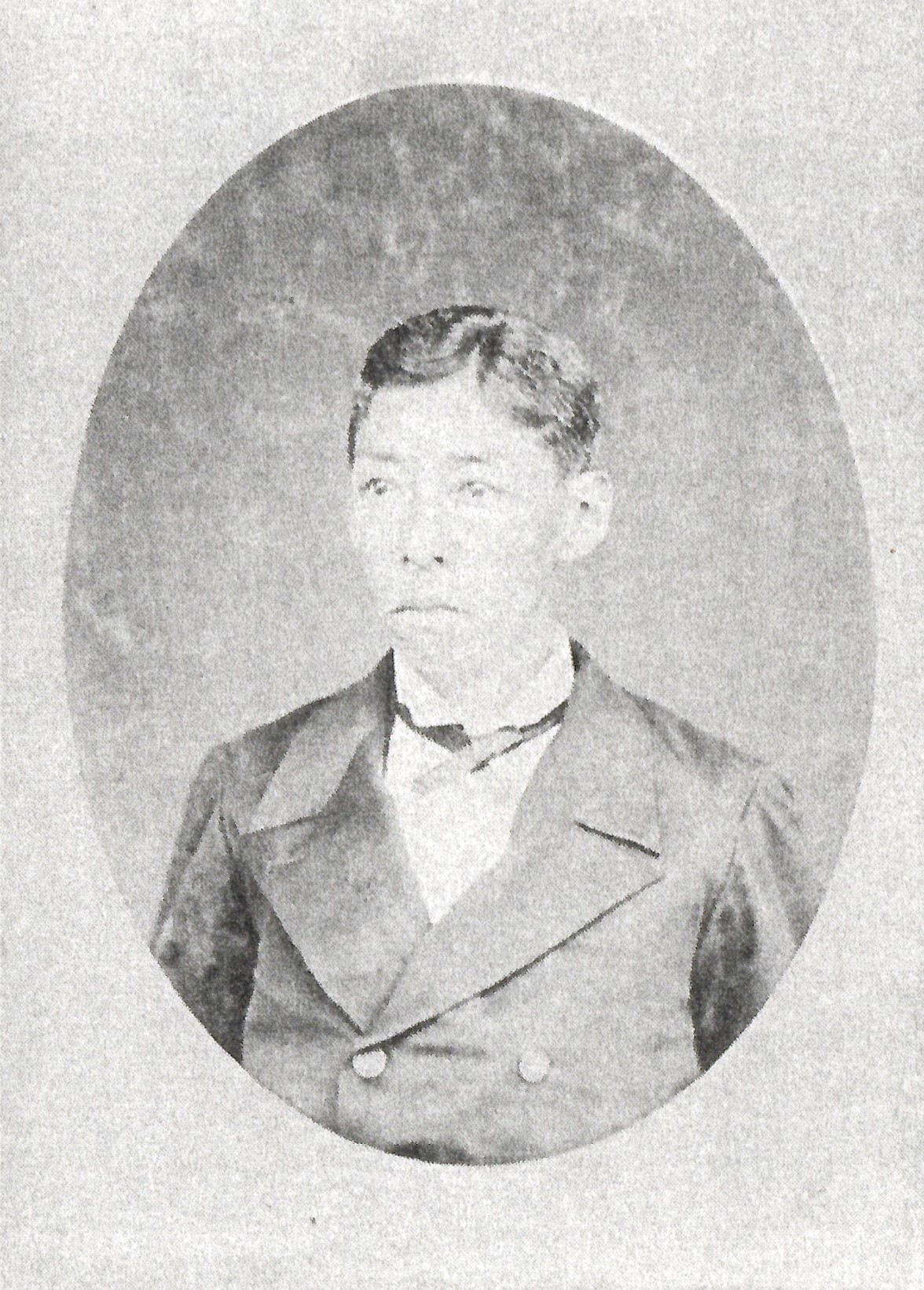
Honda Tadaaki, final daimyō of Yamasaki

Yamasaki Domain (山崎藩, Yamasaki-han) was a feudal domain under the Tokugawa shogunate of Edo period Japan, located in Harima Province in what is now the southwestern portion of modern-day Hyōgo Prefecture. It was centered around the Yamasaki jin'ya which was located in what is now the town of Yamasaki, Hyōgo. It was initially controlled by a cadet branch tozama daimyō Ikeda clan, but later came under the control of a cadet branch of the Honda clan. It was also called Shisō Domain (宍粟藩, Shisō-han)

== History ==
In 1615, the 1st daimyō of Okayama Domain, Ikeda Tadatsugu suddenly died at the age of 16 under somewhat suspicious circumstances. His mother, Tokuhime was a daughter of Tokugawa Ieyasu, and she asked that the Tokugawa shogunate separate out the 35,000 koku of his holdings in Harima Province as a separate domain for his younger brother, Ikeda Teruzumi. In 1631, Ikeda Teruzumi added an additional 30,000 koku from his younger brother, Ikeda Teruoki from Ako Domain. However, soon afterwards the domain erupted into a civil war between the two chief karō, Ogawa Shiroemon and Iori Iki. Takebe Masanaga of neighboring Hayashida Domain unsuccessfully attempted an arbitration, and in 1640 the shogunate was forced to directly intervene, ordering the seppuku of 20 senior retainers. Under most circumstances, this would have included Ikeda Teruzumi himself, but since he was a grandson of Tokugawa Ieyasu, he was demoted to a kokudaka of 10,000 koku and reassigned to Shikano Domain in Inaba Province. The Ikeda were replaced by Matsudaira Yasuteru, formerly of Kishiwada Domain. He ruled from 1640 to his transfer to Hamada Domain in 1649. Another cadet branch of the Ikeda clan came to Yamasaki from the Kojima sub-domain of Okayama Domain and riled to 1672, when the line went extinct due to lack of an heir.

Yamasaki Domain was then assigned to a cadet branch of the Honda clan from the Kōriyama-Shinden sub-domain of Kōriyama Domain of Yamato Province. The Honda ruled until the Meiji restoration. The 8th daimyō Honda Tadachika opened the han school Shisaikan" and made an effort to rebuild the clan's finances. However, after dispatching troops for the First Chōshū expedition in the Bakumatsu period, the clan's finances were ruined, and as a result, it was not possible to dispatch troops to the Second Chōshū expedition. At the time of the Battle of Toba-Fushimi, the clan refused to participate due to lack of funds. In 1871, with the abolition of the han system, the domain became Yamasaki Prefecture, which was merged with Shikama Prefecture, which in turn became part of Hyogo Prefecture.

The clan was ennobled with the kazoku peerage title of shishaku (viscount) in 1884.

== Holdings at the end of the Edo period ==
As with most domains in the han system, Yamasaki Domain consisted of several discontinuous territories calculated to provide the assigned kokudaka, based on periodic cadastral surveys and projected agricultural yields.

- Harima Province
  - 34 villages in Shisō District

== List of daimyō ==
#	Name	Tenure	Courtesy title	Court Rank	kokudaka
Ikeda clan, 1615-1871 (Tozama)
1	Ikeda Teruzumi (池田輝澄)	1615 - 1640	Iwami-no-kami (石見守); Jijū (侍従)	Junior 4th Rank, Lower Grade (従四位下)	38,000 -> 68,000 koku
Matsui-Matsudaira clan, 1640-1649 (Fudai)
1	Matsudaira Yasuteru (松平康映)	1640 - 1649	Awa-no-kami (淡路守)	Junior 5th Rank, Lower Grade (従五位下)	50,000 koku
Ikeda clan, 1649-1678 (Tozama)
1	Ikeda Tsunemoto (池田恒元)	1649 - 1671	Bingo-no-kami (備後守)	Junior 5th Rank, Lower Grade (従五位下)	30,000 koku
2	Ikeda Masachika (池田政周)	1671 - 1677	Bizen-no-kami (豊前守)	Junior 5th Rank, Lower Grade (従五位下)	30,000 koku
3	Ikeda Tsuneyuki (池田恒行)	1677 - 1678	-none-	none -	30,000 koku
Honda clan, 1678-1871 (Fudai)
1	Honda Tadahide (本多忠英)	1679 - 1718	Higo-no-kami (肥後守)	Junior 5th Rank, Lower Grade (従五位下)	10,000 koku
2	Honda Tadamichi (本多忠方)	1718 - 1731	Higo-no-kami (肥後守)	Junior 5th Rank, Lower Grade (従五位下)	10,000 koku
3	Honda Tadaoki (本多忠辰)	1731 - 1750	Higo-no-kami (肥後守)	Junior 5th Rank, Lower Grade (従五位下)	10,000 koku
4	Honda Tadato (本多忠堯)	1750 - 1761	Yamato-no-kami (大和守)	Junior 5th Rank, Lower Grade (従五位下)	10,000 koku
5	Honda Tadayoshi (本多忠可)	1761 - 1788	Higo-no-kami (肥後守)	Junior 5th Rank, Lower Grade (従五位下)	10,000 koku
6	Honda Tadaoki (本多忠居)	1788 - 1812	Yamato-no-kami (大和守)	Junior 5th Rank, Lower Grade (従五位下)	10,000 koku
7	Honda Tadataka (本多忠敬)	1812 - 1834	Higo-no-kami (肥後守)	Junior 5th Rank, Lower Grade (従五位下)	10,000 koku
8	Honda Tadachika (本多忠敬)	1834 - 1869	Higo-no-kami (肥後守)	Junior 5th Rank, Lower Grade (従五位下)	10,000 koku
9	Honda Tadaaki (本多忠明)	1869 - 1871	Hizen-no-kami (肥前守)	4th Ranke (正四位)	10,000 koku

== See also ==
- List of Han
- Abolition of the han system
