= Yamaji =

Yamaji (written: 山路 lit. "mountain road", 山地 lit. "mountain ground" or やまじ in hiragana) is a Japanese surname. Notable people with the surname include:

- Yamaji Aizan (山路愛山; 1865–1917), Japanese writer, journalist, and historian
- Ebine Yamaji (やまじ えびね), Japanese manga artist
- Kazuhiro Yamaji (山路 和弘; born 1954), Japanese actor and voice actor
- Mika Yamaji (born 1978), Japanese film director
- Yamaji Motoharu (山地 元治; 1841–1897), Japanese general
- Noriko Yamaji (山路 典子; born 1970), Japanese softball player
- Yamaji Nushizumi (山路 主住; 1704–1773), Japanese mathematician
- Osamu Yamaji (山路 修; 1929–2021), Japanese footballer
- Yasuo Yamaji (山路泰生; born 1985), Japanese rugby union player
- Yoshihito Yamaji (山路 嘉人; born 1971), Japanese footballer
- Yukio Yamaji (山地 悠紀夫; 1983–2009), Japanese murderer

== See also ==
- Yamatji, a Western Australian Aboriginal people, also spelt Yamaji
