= Tsuchinoko =

Snake-like creature in Japanese folklore

- Depiction from the Shinano Kishōroku

Creature information
- Other name: Bachi-hebi (North Japan)
- Grouping: Yokai
- Sub grouping: Reptile

Origin
- Country: Japan

In Japanese folklore, the tsuchinoko (ツチノコ or 槌の子), literally translating to "child of hammer", is a snake-like cryptid. The name tsuchinoko is prevalent in Western Japan, including Kansai and Shikoku; the creature is known as bachi hebi (バチヘビ) in Northeastern Japan.

== Description ==
Tsuchinoko are described as ranging between 30 and 80 centimetres (12 and 31 inches) in length, having a similar appearance to a snake but with a wider central girth, and as having fangs and venom similar to that of a viper. Some accounts also describe the tsuchinoko as being able to jump up to 1 metre (3.3 feet) in distance, followed immediately by a second jump while still in the air.

According to legend, some tsuchinoko possess the ability to speak and also have a propensity for lying. They are also said to have a taste for alcohol. Legends claim that it will sometimes swallow its own tail so that it can roll like a wheel, similarly to the "hoop snake" of American legend.

== Sightings ==
In the late 1980s, a wave of purported sightings of the tsuchinoko was reported across Japan, primarily in the village of Shimokitayama in Nara Prefecture. In 1988, Kazuo Nozaki, a member of Shimokitayama's village council, launched a "Tsuchinoko Expedition" to find the creature, which offered 1 million yen ($7,800 at the time) for its live capture and 300,000 yen for a sample of its skin. The expedition was joined by around 200 people from across the country and lasted until the beginning of the Japanese asset price bubble collapse in 1990. No evidence of its existence was uncovered. To commemorate the event, the Shimokitayama Tsuchinoko Park was established in 2023.

=== Tohoku region ===
In a mountain close to Lake Towada, a sighting of a 30-centimetre (1 ft) creature of a similar shape to the Tsuchinoko was reported. On 4 April 2007, a Tsuchinoko-shaped dead body of a snake was allegedly discovered inside imported hay on a farm located in Ōkura, although it reportedly went missing.

== Search efforts and bounties ==
This is a list of municipalities and companies offering rewards for capturing Tsuchinoko, including those who ended the bounties.

- Chikusa, Hyogo Prefecture - 2 million yen (bounty ended after merging into Shisō.)
- Yoshii, Okayama Prefecture - 20,000,000 yen

== See also ==
- List of cryptids
