= Takeaki Matsumoto =

Japanese politician (1959–2026)

- 松本 剛明
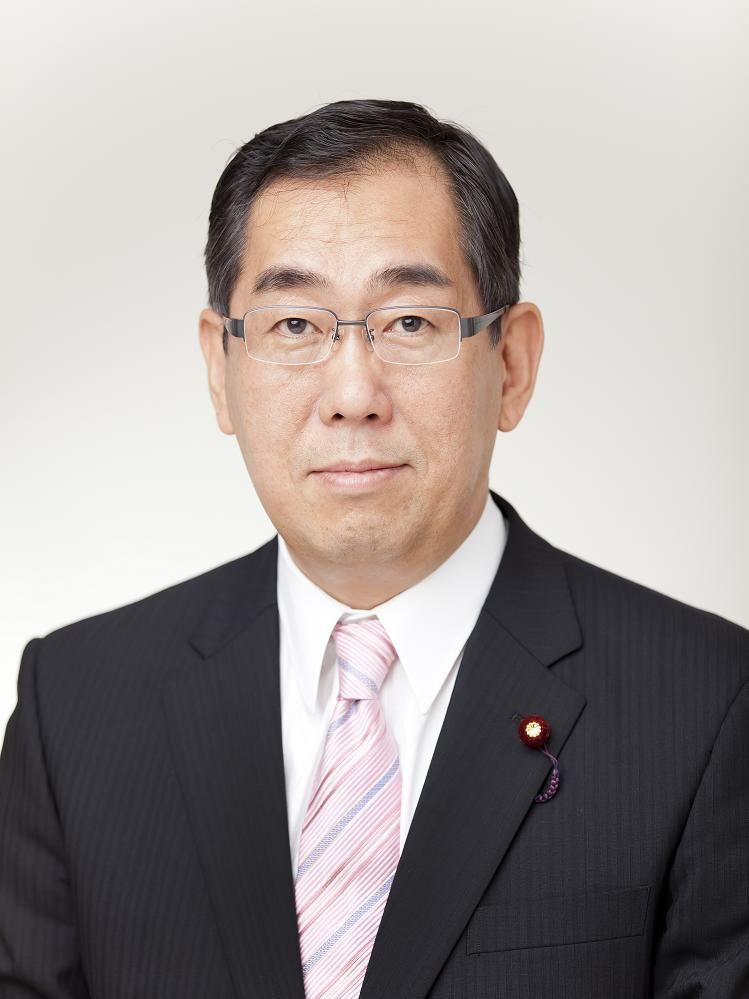
- Official portrait, 2012

Minister for Internal Affairs and Communications
- In office 14 December 2023 – 1 October 2024
- Prime Minister: Fumio Kishida
- Preceded by: Junji Suzuki
- Succeeded by: Seiichiro Murakami
- In office 21 November 2022 – 13 September 2023
- Prime Minister: Fumio Kishida
- Preceded by: Minoru Terada
- Succeeded by: Junji Suzuki

Minister of Foreign Affairs
- In office 9 March 2011 – 2 September 2011
- Prime Minister: Naoto Kan
- Preceded by: Seiji Maehara; Yukio Edano (acting)
- Succeeded by: Kōichirō Gemba

Member of the House of Representatives
- In office 26 June 2000 – 23 January 2026
- Preceded by: Tōru Toida
- Succeeded by: Motoyasu Yamada
- Constituency: Hyōgo 11th (2000–2005); Kinki PR (2005–2009); Hyōgo 11th (2009–2026)

Personal details
- Born: 25 April 1959 Tokyo, Japan
- Died: 27 July 2026 (aged 67) Tokyo, Japan
- Party: LDP (since 2017)
- Other political affiliations: Independent (before 1998; 2015–2017); DPJ (1998–2015)
- Education: University of Tokyo

Takeaki Matsumoto (松本 剛明, Matsumoto Takeaki; 25 April 1959 – 27 July 2026) was a Japanese politician who served as Minister for Foreign Affairs in 2011. A native of Tokyo and graduate of the University of Tokyo, he was elected to the House of Representatives for the first time in 2000 after running unsuccessfully as an independent in 1996.

== Life and career ==
Matsumoto was a great-great-grandson of Itō Hirobumi, the first Prime Minister of Japan. Matsumoto's father, Juro Matsumoto, was a senior member of the Liberal Democratic Party and was the Minister of Defense from August 1989 to February 1990. Matsumoto was selected as Foreign Minister of Japan in 2011 by Prime Minister Naoto Kan, after the resignation of his predecessor, Seiji Maehara, only two days before the 11 March earthquake and tsunami and subsequent Fukushima I nuclear disaster.

In 2015 Matsumoto left the DPJ citing the party's opposition to the 2015 Japanese military legislation and cooperation with the JCP. Before the 2017 elections he joined the Liberal Democratic Party.

In November 2022, Matsumoto was appointed by Prime Minister Fumio Kishida to be Minister for Internal Affairs and Communications, replacing Minoru Terada who had resigned the previous day.

Matsumoto died from complications of amyotrophic lateral sclerosis in Tokyo, on 27 July 2026, at the age of 67.

== Ancestry ==
Ancestors of Takeaki Matsumoto

2. Jūrō Matsumoto
1. Takeaki Matsumoto
6. Keinosuke Fujii
3. Etsuko Fujii
14. Nishi Genshirō
7. Seiko Nishi
30. Itō Hirobumi
15. Asako Itō

House of Representatives (Japan)
| Preceded by Tōru Toida | Member of the House of Representatives for Hyōgo 11th district 2000–2005 | Succeeded by Tōru Toida |
| New constituency | Member of the House of Representatives for Kinki; 2005–2009 | Constituency abolished |
| Preceded by Tōru Toida | Member of the House of Representatives for Hyōgo 11th district 2009–2026 | Succeeded by Motoyasu Yamada |
Party political offices
| Preceded by Yoshito Sengoku | Chair of Policy Research of the Democratic Party; 2005–2007 | Succeeded by Masayuki Naoshima |
Political offices
| Preceded by Kōichi Takemasa; Osamu Fujimura | Senior Vice Minister of Foreign Affairs; 2010–2011; Served alongside: Yutaka Banno | Succeeded by Yutaka Banno; Chiaki Takahashi |
| Preceded by Yukio Edano; Acting | Minister of Foreign Affairs; 2011 | Succeeded by Kōichirō Gemba |
| Preceded by Minoru Terada | Minister for Internal Affairs and Communications; 2022–2023 | Succeeded by Junji Suzuki |
| Preceded by Junji Suzuki | Minister for Internal Affairs and Communications; 2023–2024 | Succeeded by Seiichiro Murakami |
