= Banshu Yamasaki Iris Garden =

Iris flower garden in Hyōgo Prefecture, Japan

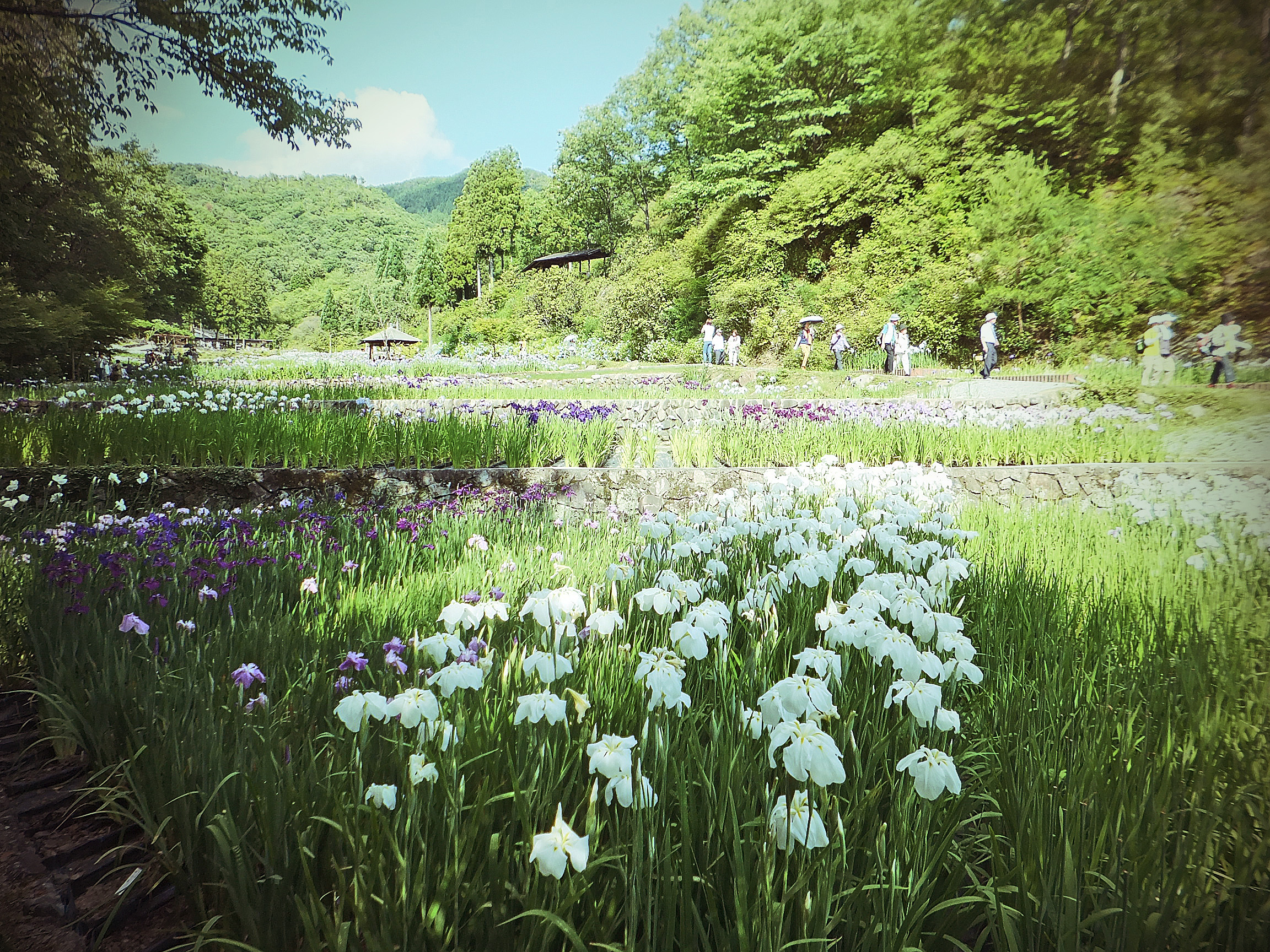
- Banshu Yamasaki Iris Garden (2013)
- Interactive map of Banshu Yamasaki Iris Garden
- Type: urban park
- Location: Shisō, Hyōgo, Japan
- Coordinates: 35°00′31.9″N 134°33′26.5″E
- Area: 60,000 m^{2} (650,000 ft^{2})
- Created: 1979

The Banshu Yamasaki Iris Garden (播州山崎花菖蒲園, Banshu Yamasaki Shobuen) is an iris flower garden approximately 1.25 km (2 miles) northeast of Shisō in Hyōgo Prefecture, in the Kansai region of Japan.
