= Chikusa, Hyōgo =

Former town in Hyōgo Prefecture, Japan

Chikusa (千種町, Chikusa-chō) was a town located in Shisō District, Hyōgo Prefecture, Japan.

As of 2003, the town had an estimated population of 3,876 and a density of 37.07 persons per km^{2}. The total area was 104.57 km^{2}.

On April 1, 2005, Chikusa, along with the towns of Haga, Ichinomiya and Yamasaki (all from Shisō District), was merged to create the city of Shisō and no longer exists as an independent municipality.

The town offered a reward for any sightings of a legendary being called a tsuchinoko and still has a mascot called Tsuchi-kun based on the legend.
