= Haga, Hyōgo =

Former town in Hyōgo Prefecture, Japan

Haga (波賀町, Haga-chō) was a town located in Shisō District, Hyōgo Prefecture, Japan.

As of 2003, the town had an estimated population of 4,691 and a density of 29.08 persons per km^{2}. The total area was 161.30 km^{2}.

On April 1, 2005, Haga, along with the towns of Chikusa, Ichinomiya and Yamasaki (all from Shisō District), was merged to create the city of Shisō and no longer exists as an independent municipality.
