= Tōru Toida =

Japanese politician

- 戸井田 徹
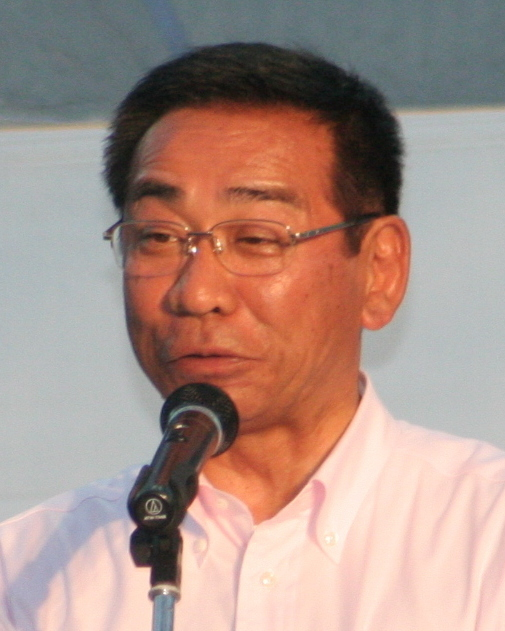
- Toida in 2010

Member of the House of Representatives
- In office 11 September 2005 – 21 July 2009
- Preceded by: Takeaki Matsumoto
- Succeeded by: Takeaki Matsumoto
- Constituency: Hyōgo 11th
- In office 20 October 1996 – 2 June 2000
- Preceded by: Constituency established
- Succeeded by: Takeaki Matsumoto
- Constituency: Hyōgo 11th

Personal details
- Born: 25 November 1951 (age 74) Henan, China
- Party: Liberal Democratic
- Parent: Saburō Toida (father)
- Education: Dokkyo University

Tōru Toida (戸井田 徹, Toida Tōru; born 25 November 1951) is a former Japanese politician who served in the House of Representatives in the Diet (national legislature) as a member of the Liberal Democratic Party.

== Early life and education ==
Toida was born Henan, China in 1951 to Japanese parents. His father, Saburō Toida, was a student soldier and a medical soldier in the Imperial Japanese Army, while his mother was a former military nurse. After World War II, both parents were conscripted into the Eighth Route Army as they had experience and knowledge in medicine, nursing, and hygiene. The family moved back to Japan in 1953 and settled down in Edogawa, Tokyo. Toida graduated with a degree from Dokkyo University.

== Career ==
Toida was first elected in 1996.

== Right-wing positions ==
He was a supporter of right-wing filmmaker Satoru Mizushima's 2007 film The Truth about Nanjing, which denied that the Nanjing Massacre ever occurred.
