= Yoshino Province =

Former province of Japan

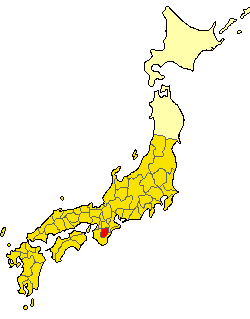
Location of Yoshino Province c. 716.

Yoshino Province (芳野監, Yoshino (no) Gen; fl. about 716 – after 738) was a Japanese province in the area of Nara Prefecture on the island of Honshū. It was a short-lived special division of the provinces of Japan, a part of Kinai. It was composed of only one district, Yoshino (吉野郡, Yoshino-gun). Its extent roughly coincides with that of today's Yoshino District plus Gojō city.

Yoshino was established by separating Yoshino District from Yamato Province. The time of its founding is unknown, but it is thought that it happened at around the same time as the establishment of Izumi Province (和泉監, Izumi-gen) in 716. The unit name “gen” (監) was different from the “kuni” (国) of normal provinces. No record remains of the reasons for their establishment. Both new provinces were unusually small and contained secondary palaces: the Yoshino Palace (吉野宮, Yoshino-miya) in the Yoshino province and the Chinu Palace in Izumi.

Yoshino Province was abolished some time after the year 738 and its territory was absorbed back into Yamato Province.

== Other websites ==
Media related to Yoshino Province at Wikimedia Commons

- Murdoch's map of provinces, 1903
- Daimyo-issued banknote from Yamato-Washu Province, 1744-1748
