= Yuyama =

Yuyama Co., Ltd.
- Native name: 株式会社ユヤマ
- Company type: Private KK
- Industry: Medical equipment
- Founded: November 1964; 61 years ago
- Headquarters: Toyonaka, Osaka Prefecture, Japan
- Area served: Worldwide
- Key people: Hiroyuki Yuyama (President)
- Products: Automatic tablet packing machines; Automatic vial filling machines; Powder packing machines
- Number of employees: 1300 (as of 31 March 2019)
- Website: Official website

Yuyama Co., Ltd. (株式会社ユヤマ, Kabushiki-gaisha Yuyama) is a pharmaceutical automation company. It was founded in 1964 in Osaka, Japan. Since 1996 the company has had offices in United States.
