= Shikama District =

Former district in Hyōgo prefecture, Japan

Shikama (飾磨郡, Shikama-gun) was a district located in Hyōgo Prefecture, Japan.

As of 2003, the district had an estimated population of 30,453 and a density of 182.91 persons per km^{2}. The total area is 166.49 km^{2}.

== Towns and villages ==
- Ieshima
- Yumesaki

== Mergers ==
- On March 27, 2006 - the towns of Ieshima and Yumesaki, along with the town of Yasutomi (from Shisō District), and the town of Kōdera (from Kanzaki District), were merged into the expanded city of Himeji. Shikama District was dissolved as a result of this merger.
