= Yanaizu, Gifu =

Town in Hashima district, Japan

Map of Yanaizu, Gifu

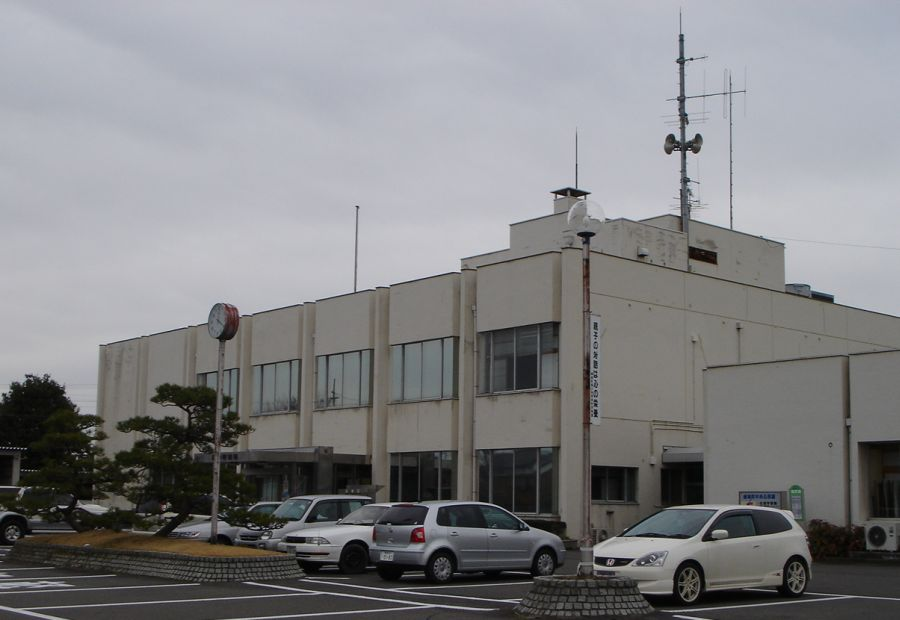
Former town office.

Yanaizu (柳津町, Yanaizu-chō) was a town located in Hashima District, Gifu Prefecture, Japan.

On January 1, 2006, Yanaizu was merged into the expanded city of Gifu and no longer exists as an independent municipality. In 2005 it had a population of 13,436 people.

== Education ==
The former town is the location of one public and one private high school, as well as one public junior high school and one public elementary school.

The Buddhist Pure Land Sect runs a junior high school and an elementary school in Yanaizu. It is also the location of a North Korean school, Gifu Korean Elementary and Junior High School (岐阜朝鮮初中級学校).
