= Shisō District =

Former district in Hyōgo prefecture, Japan

Shisō (宍粟郡, Shisō-gun) was a district located in Hyōgo Prefecture, Japan.

As of April 1, 2005 (but with June 30, 2004 population data), the district had an estimated population of 5,983 and a density of 99 persons per km^{2}. The total area was 60.30 km^{2}.

== Towns and villages ==
- Yasutomi

== Mergers ==
- On April 1, 2005 - the towns of Chikusa, Haga, Ichinomiya and Yamasaki were merged to create the city of Shisō.
- On March 27, 2006 - the town of Yasutomi, along with the towns of Ieshima and Yumesaki (both from Shikama District), and the town of Kōdera (from Kanzaki District), was merged into the expanded city of Himeji.
