= Harima Province =

Former province of Japan

Map of Japanese provinces (1868) with Harima Province highlighted

Harima Province (播磨国, Harima no Kuni; Japanese pronunciation: [hä́.ɾʲì.mä̀ (nò̞ kɯ̈̀.ɲ̟ì)]) or Banshū (播州) was a province of Japan in the part of Honshū that is the southwestern part of present-day Hyōgo Prefecture. Harima bordered on Tajima, Tanba, Settsu, Bizen, and Mimasaka Provinces. Its capital was Himeji.

During the Edo period of Japanese history, the Akō Domain (fief) was part of Harima. The Forty-seven rōnin were samurai of Akō han. IHI Corporation, a shipbuilder and major Boeing engine subcontractor gets its name from the province.

== History ==
Harima Province was established in 7th century. During the Meiji Restoration, Himeji Prefecture was established with the whole area of Harima Province as the territory. Himeji Prefecture was renamed to Shikama prefecture, and Shikama Prefecture was transferred to Hyōgo Prefecture finally.

Harima Sake Culture Tourism promotes the region as the "Hometown of Japanese Sake".

== Temples and shrines ==
Iwa jinja was the chief Shinto shrine (ichinomiya) of Harima.

== Historical districts ==
- Hyōgo Prefecture
  - Akashi District (明石郡) - dissolved
  - Akō District (赤穂郡)
  - Innan District (印南郡) - dissolved
  - Issai District (揖西郡) - merged with Ittō District to become Ibo District (揖保郡) on April 1, 1896
  - Ittō District (揖東郡) - merged with Issai District to become Ibo District on April 1, 1896
  - Jinsai District (神西郡) - merged with Jintō District to become Kanzaki District (神崎郡) on April 1, 1896
  - Jintō District (神東郡) - merged with Jinsai District to become Kanzaki District on April 1, 1896
  - Kako District (加古郡)
  - Kamo District (賀茂郡)
    - Kasai District (加西郡) - dissolved
    - Katō District (加東郡) - dissolved
  - Mino District (美嚢郡) - dissolved
  - Sayō District (佐用郡)
  - Shikisai District (飾西郡) - merged with Shikitō District to become Shikama District (飾磨郡) on April 1, 1896
  - Shikitō District (飾東郡) - merged with Shikisai District to become Shikama District on April 1, 1896
  - Shisō District (宍粟郡) - dissolved
  - Taka District (多可郡)
