= Miyagawa Yashukichi =

Miyagawa Yashukichi (born c. 1888) was a Japanese drug trafficker who, while residing in Great Britain as a purchasing agent for a Japanese company, was responsible for one of the largest drug rings in operation at the time. Sending thousands of pounds of heroin to Japan via London, he came under investigation by authorities after customs officials became suspicious of an unusually large order of dolls shipped from Hamburg, Germany to his firm. Examining each by hand, agents discovered thousands of dollars' worth of cocaine had been smuggled inside nearly a dozen dolls.

A further investigation traced the order to Yashukichi, whose bank records revealed large cheques issued to a known drug exporter in Hamburg. One of these purchases, a total sum of £40,000, was the largest ever purchased outside of Germany at the time.

After Yashukichi received a shipping invoice for a shipment waiting to be delivered from Marseilles to Kobe, upon further inspection authorities discovered muriate and morphine crystals in canisters marked "tannic acid". With this evidence, police arrested Yashukichi on 5 November 1923. Later pleading guilty to drug trafficking, Yashukichi was sentenced by Justice Sir Ernest Wild to three years in prison.
