= Ieshima, Hyōgo =

Ieshima 家島町
- Former municipality
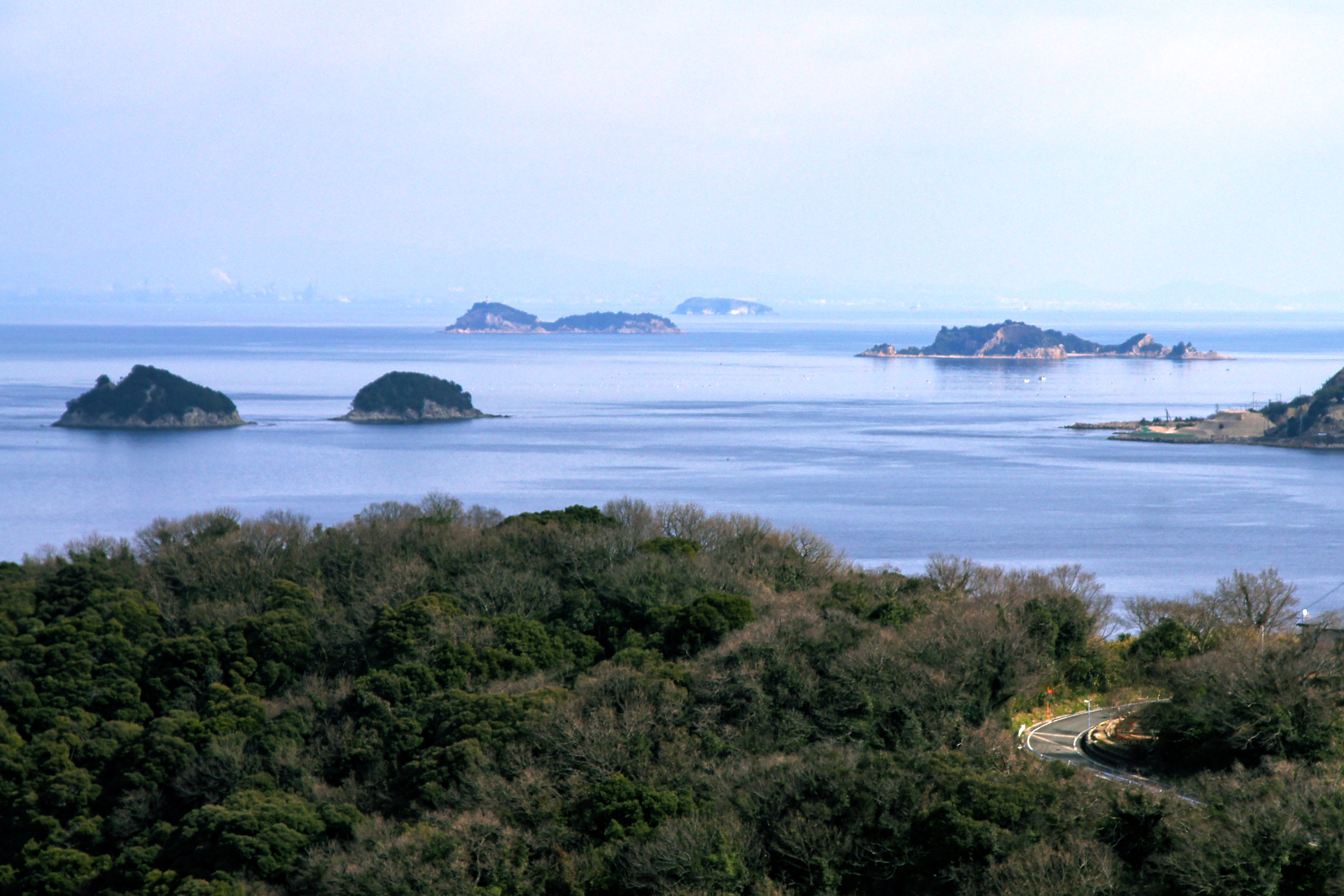
- View of the smaller Ieshima Islands

- Flag

- Location in Japan
- Coordinates: 34°40′29″N 134°31′10″E
- Country: Japan
- Prefecture: Hyōgo
- District: Shikama

Area
  - Land: 20.27 km^{2} (7.83 sq mi)

Population (February 1, 2006)
  - Total: 7,915
  - Density: 390/km^{2} (1,000/sq mi)
- Climate: Cfa

Ieshima (家島町, Ieshima-chō) was a town located in Shikama District, Hyōgo Prefecture, Japan. It actually is a group of 44 small islands (4 main inhabited ones and 40 smaller uninhabited ones) about 18 kilometers off the coast of Himeji and Akō. Ieshima is one of the big islands but the name Ieshima is also used to refer to the entire chain of Islands.

On March 27, 2006, the towns Ieshima, Yumesaki (also from Shikama District), Yasutomi (Shisō District), and Kōdera (Kanzaki District) were merged into the expanded city of Himeji and are no longer independent municipalities.

== Main islands ==
- Ieshima (家島): 5.46 km^{2}, about 4,000 inhabitants
- Bozejima (坊勢島): 1.87 km^{2}, about 4,000 inhabitants
- Nishijima (西島): 6.59 km^{2}, about 100 inhabitants
- Tangajima (男鹿島): 4.57 km^{2}, about 150 inhabitants

Most of the population lives on Ieshima and Bozejima. Ieshima is divided into 2 "hamlets" called Miya and Maura. The two main industries of Ieshima are fishing and quarrying. Tangajima and Nishijima have been quarried for at least 400 years and supplied stones used in the building of Osaka Castle. The eastern part of Nishijima is maintained as a camping and recreation ground by Hyogo Prefecture. Ieshima is host to the annual Open Water Swim Competition which has been rapidly gaining fame as one of the most popular open water swim competitions in Japan. The race takes place between the islands of Tangajima and Ieshima.

== Transport ==
Ieshima and Bozejima can be reached by a 35-minute boat ride from Himeji Port.

== Climate ==
Climate data for Ieshima (1991−2020 normals, extremes 1978−present)
Month	Jan	Feb	Mar	Apr	May	Jun	Jul	Aug	Sep	Oct	Nov	Dec	Year
Record high °C (°F)	17.1 (62.8)	19.5 (67.1)	21.3 (70.3)	27.0 (80.6)	28.5 (83.3)	33.0 (91.4)	34.8 (94.6)	35.3 (95.5)	34.5 (94.1)	29.1 (84.4)	24.5 (76.1)	20.5 (68.9)	35.3 (95.5)
Mean daily maximum °C (°F)	8.4 (47.1)	9.0 (48.2)	12.3 (54.1)	17.5 (63.5)	22.1 (71.8)	25.3 (77.5)	29.0 (84.2)	30.8 (87.4)	27.3 (81.1)	22.1 (71.8)	16.4 (61.5)	10.9 (51.6)	19.3 (66.6)
Daily mean °C (°F)	5.2 (41.4)	5.3 (41.5)	8.2 (46.8)	13.2 (55.8)	17.9 (64.2)	21.5 (70.7)	25.4 (77.7)	27.0 (80.6)	23.7 (74.7)	18.5 (65.3)	13.1 (55.6)	7.8 (46.0)	15.6 (60.0)
Mean daily minimum °C (°F)	2.5 (36.5)	2.3 (36.1)	4.7 (40.5)	9.4 (48.9)	14.2 (57.6)	18.7 (65.7)	22.9 (73.2)	24.3 (75.7)	21.0 (69.8)	15.6 (60.1)	10.1 (50.2)	5.0 (41.0)	12.6 (54.6)
Record low °C (°F)	−5.3 (22.5)	−6.9 (19.6)	−2.2 (28.0)	1.4 (34.5)	6.6 (43.9)	11.7 (53.1)	16.5 (61.7)	18.8 (65.8)	13.3 (55.9)	6.7 (44.1)	2.4 (36.3)	−2.5 (27.5)	−6.9 (19.6)
Average precipitation mm (inches)	33.9 (1.33)	43.5 (1.71)	81.1 (3.19)	81.1 (3.19)	113.9 (4.48)	147.4 (5.80)	143.1 (5.63)	85.9 (3.38)	168.2 (6.62)	106.9 (4.21)	55.0 (2.17)	43.1 (1.70)	1,103 (43.43)
Average precipitation days (≥ 1.0 mm)	4.8	6.0	8.7	9.4	9.0	11.0	9.2	5.9	8.9	7.5	5.5	5.1	91
Mean monthly sunshine hours	174.0	163.6	195.7	212.8	220.4	176.1	208.0	246.7	178.0	185.3	167.4	170.9	2,298.9
Source: JMA

== Gallery ==
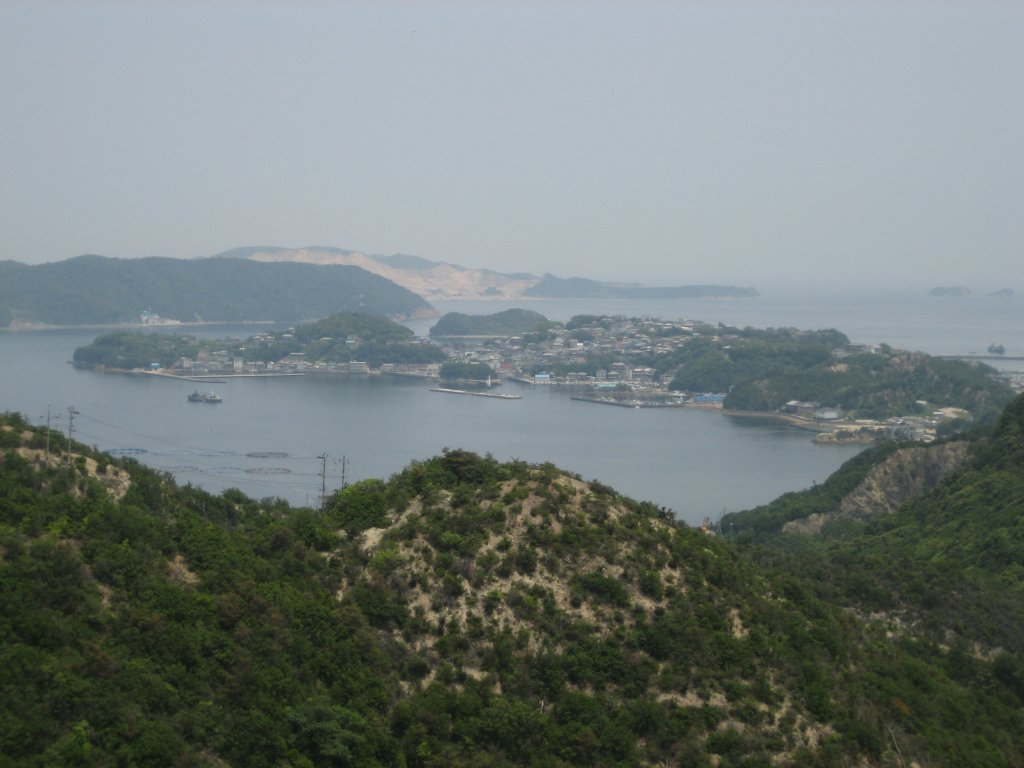
From front to back: Nishijima, Bozejima, Ieshima, Tangajima

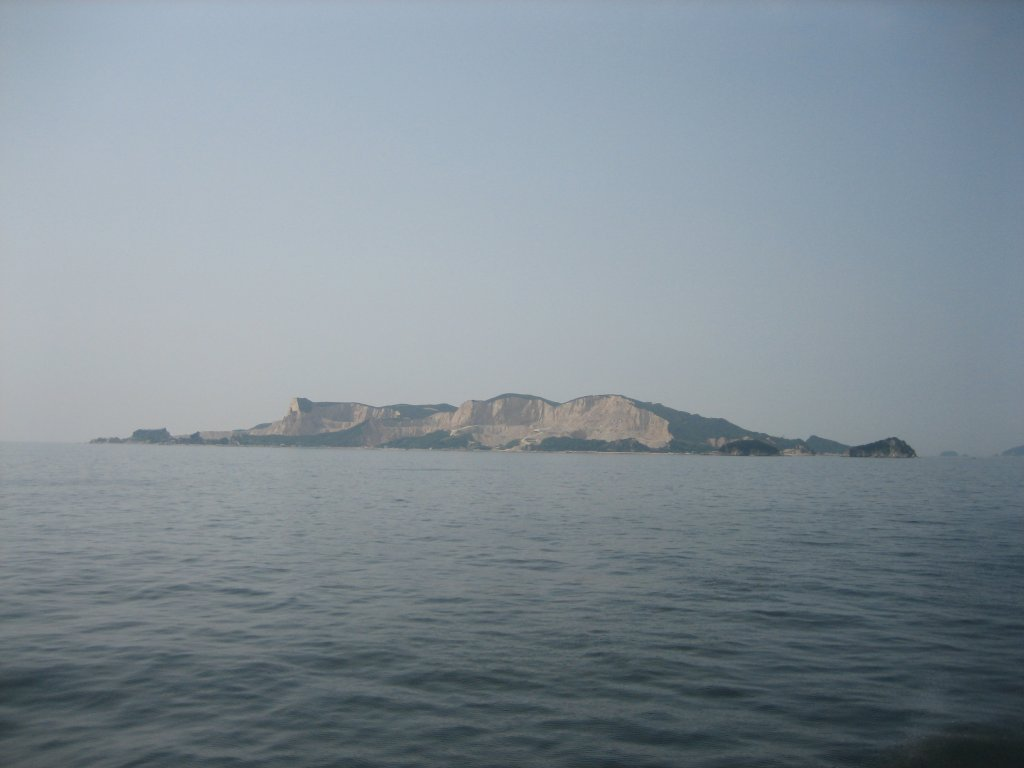
Tangajima quarry

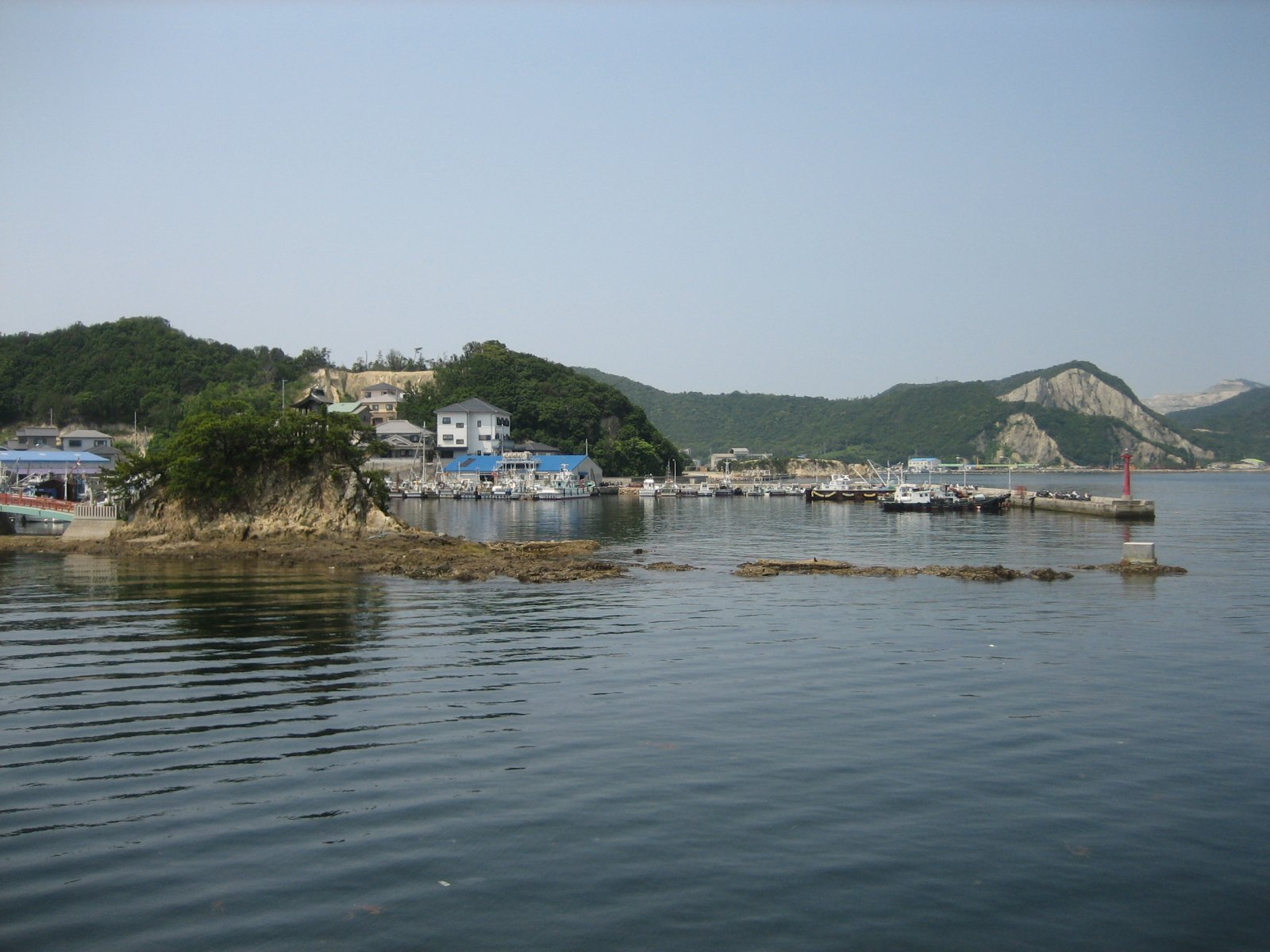
Bozejima harbour
