= Yoshi's Island (disambiguation) =

Yoshi's Island is a 1995 SNES video game by Nintendo. It may also refer to:

- Yoshi's Island DS, a sequel to Super Mario World 2: Yoshi's Island developed by Artoon
- Yoshi's New Island, a 2014 Nintendo 3DS video game developed by Arzest
