= Iwa Shrine =

Shinto shrine in Hyōgo Prefecture, Japan

Iwa Shrine 伊和神社
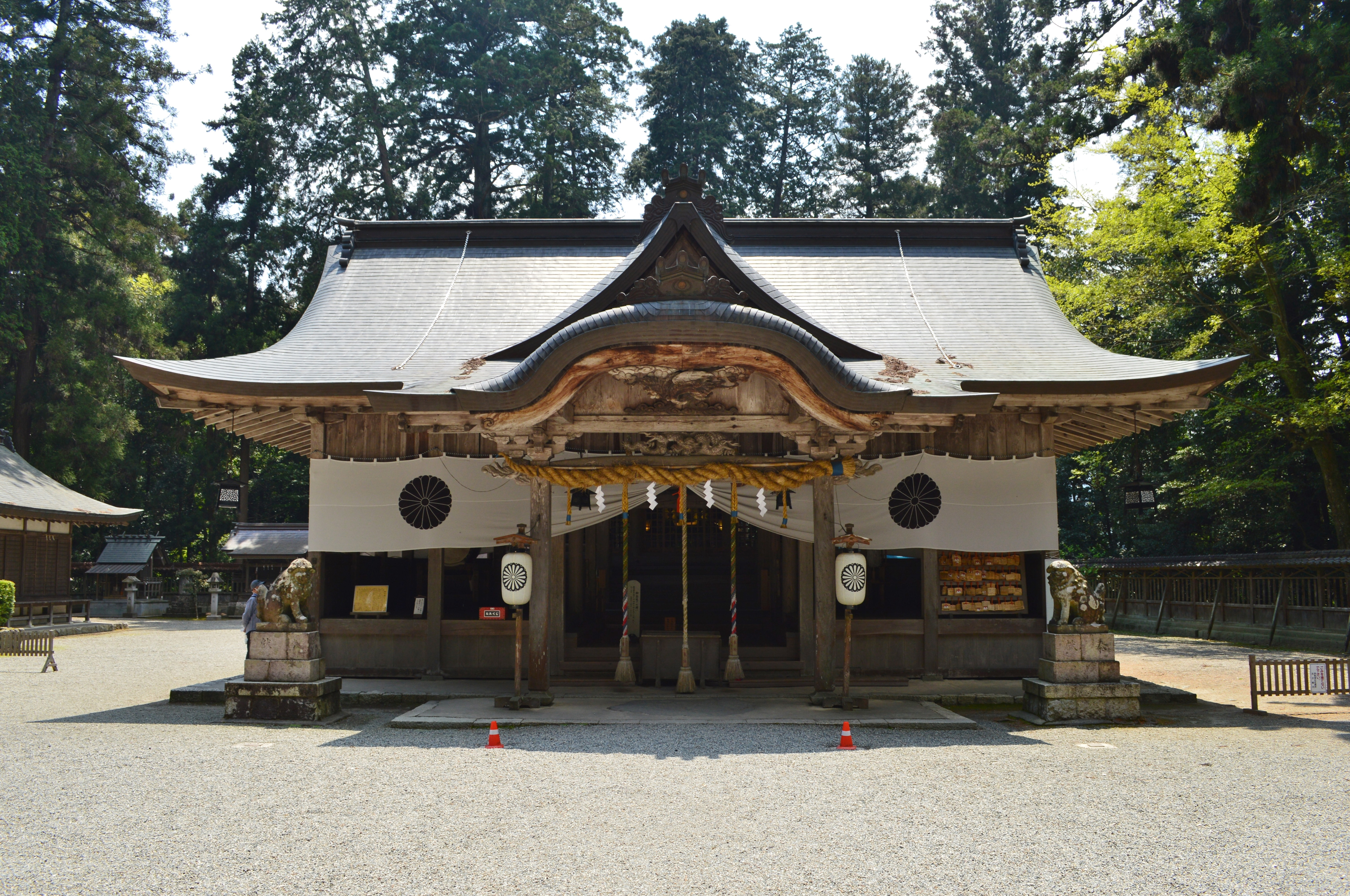
- Haiden of Iwa Shrine

- Iwa Shrine Iwa Shrine (Japan)

Religion
- Affiliation: Shinto
- Deity: Ōkuninushi
- Festival: October 15

Location
- Location: 407 Ichinomiya-chō Sugyōme, Shisō-shi, Hyōgo-ken 671-4133
- Interactive map of Iwa Shrine 伊和神社
- Coordinates: 35°05′15.1″N 134°35′11.3″E

Iwa Jinja (伊和神社) is a Shinto shrine in the Ichinomiya neighborhood of the city of Shisō in Hyōgo Prefecture, Japan. It is the ichinomiya of former Harima Province. The main festival of the shrine is held annually on October 15.

== Enshrined kami ==
The kami enshrined at Iwa Jinja are:

- Ōkuninushi (大己貴神)
- Sukunabikona (少彦名神)
- Shitateru-hime no kami (下照姫神)

== History ==
The origins of Iwa Jinja are uncertain. According to the Harima fudoki, it was during the reign of Emperor Seimu or Emperor Kinmei and takes its name from a syllable uttered by Ōkuninushi when he completed building the country. The shrine is listed in the early Heian period Engishiki and was then ichinomiya of the province from the end of the Heian period. Although destroyed periodically by fire, it has been rebuilt with the support of the Imperial Court, the Akamatsu clan and various feudal lords. After the Meiji Restoration, it was listed as a National Shrine, 2nd rank (国幣中社, Kokuhei Chusha) in 1871.

The Hitotsuyama Kofun, a Kofun period burial mound is located 400 meters to the southeast of the Iwa Shrine. It is a Hyōgo Prefectural Historic Site.

== Single Mountain Rite and Three Mountains Rite ==
"The Iwa Shrine follows a distinct cycle for its two principal rites. The Single Mountain Rite is performed once every twenty years, while the Three Mountains Rite takes place every sixty years.

Contrastingly, at Itatehyōzu Shrine, the frequency of the rites is reversed compared to Iwa Shrine: the Single Mountain Rite occurs every sixty years, and the Three Mountains Rite is celebrated every twenty years."

It is said this similarity happened because the Iwa deity was invited to Itatehyōzu Shrine in ancient times through Kanjō.

=== Single Mountain Rite ===
The Single Mountain Rite is a festival at Iwa Shrine. It happens every twenty years. The shrine is in Ichinomiya Town, Shisō County, Hyōgo Prefecture. The festival honors Mt. Miya. This mountain is said to be the tomb of Ōnamuchi-no-mikoto.

One month before the festival, a new shrine is placed on the mountain top. A white flag is raised. The festival includes worshipping three mountains from afar. These are Mt. Takahata, Mt. Hanasaki, and Mt. Shirakura. A sacred palanquin is also carried to the river valley.

=== Three Mountains Rite ===
Every twenty years, the Three Mountains Rite takes place at Iwa Shrine. This is to worship the three mountains. Itatehyōzu Shrine in Himeji City also holds these rites.

At Itatehyōzu Shrine, there is a week-long event. A bamboo and cloth mountain is built. It is fifteen meters high. It is placed at the shrine's entrance. A small shrine is put on top of this. Food offerings are made. These offerings include mochi.

Shrine	Single Mountain	Three Mountains
Itatehyōzu Shrine	20	60
Iwa Shrine	60	20

== Gallery ==
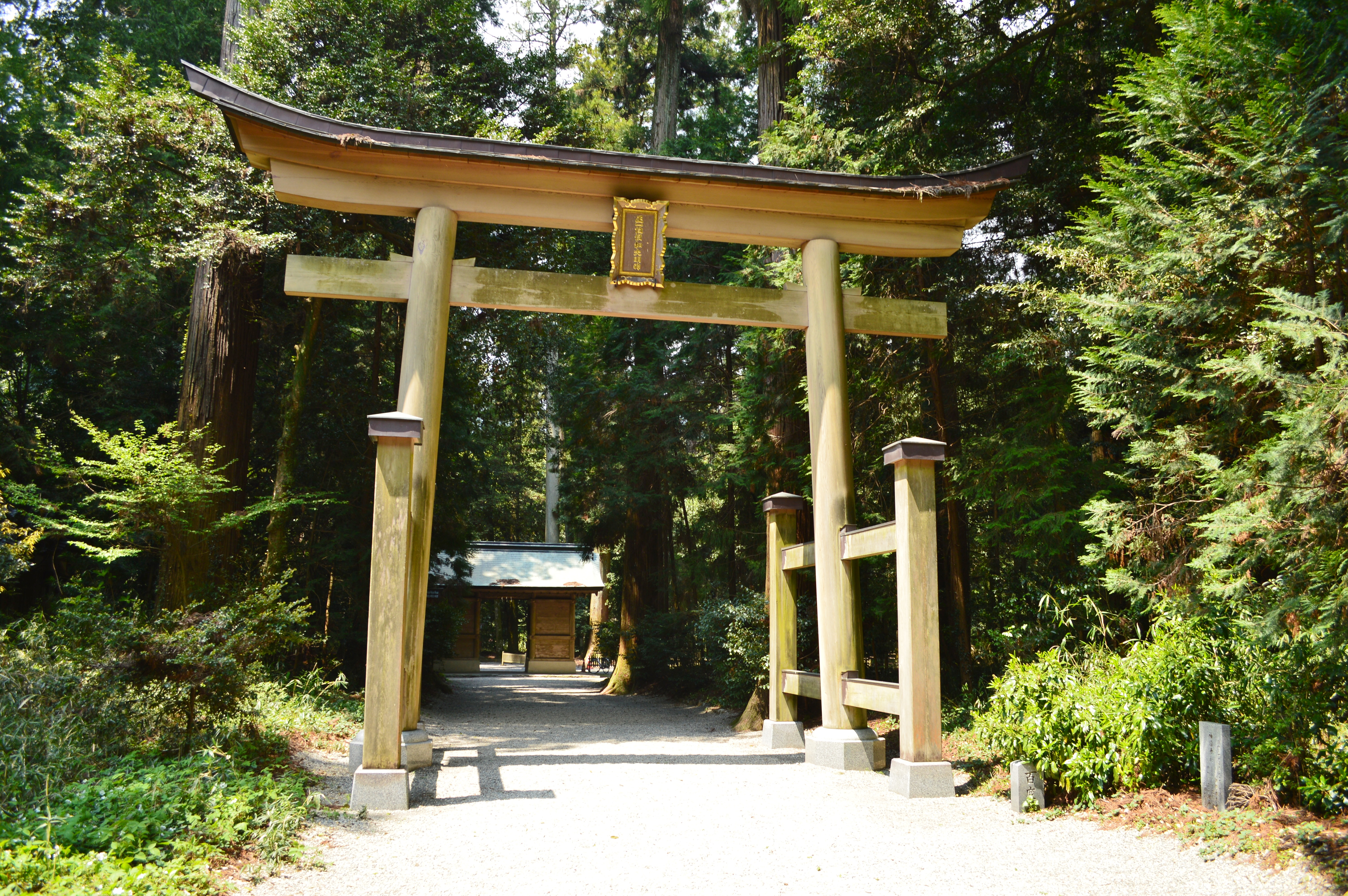
Torii

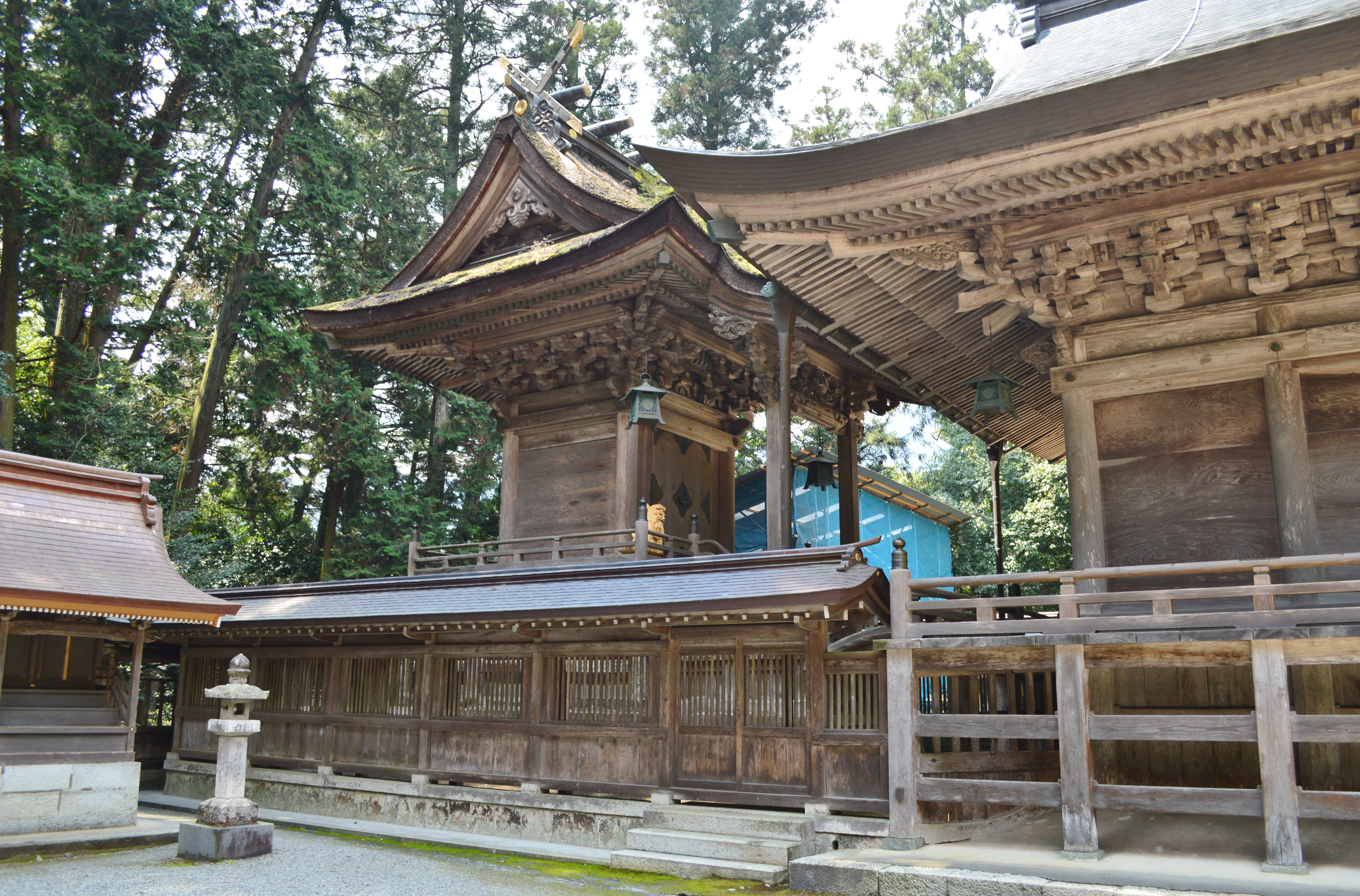
Honden

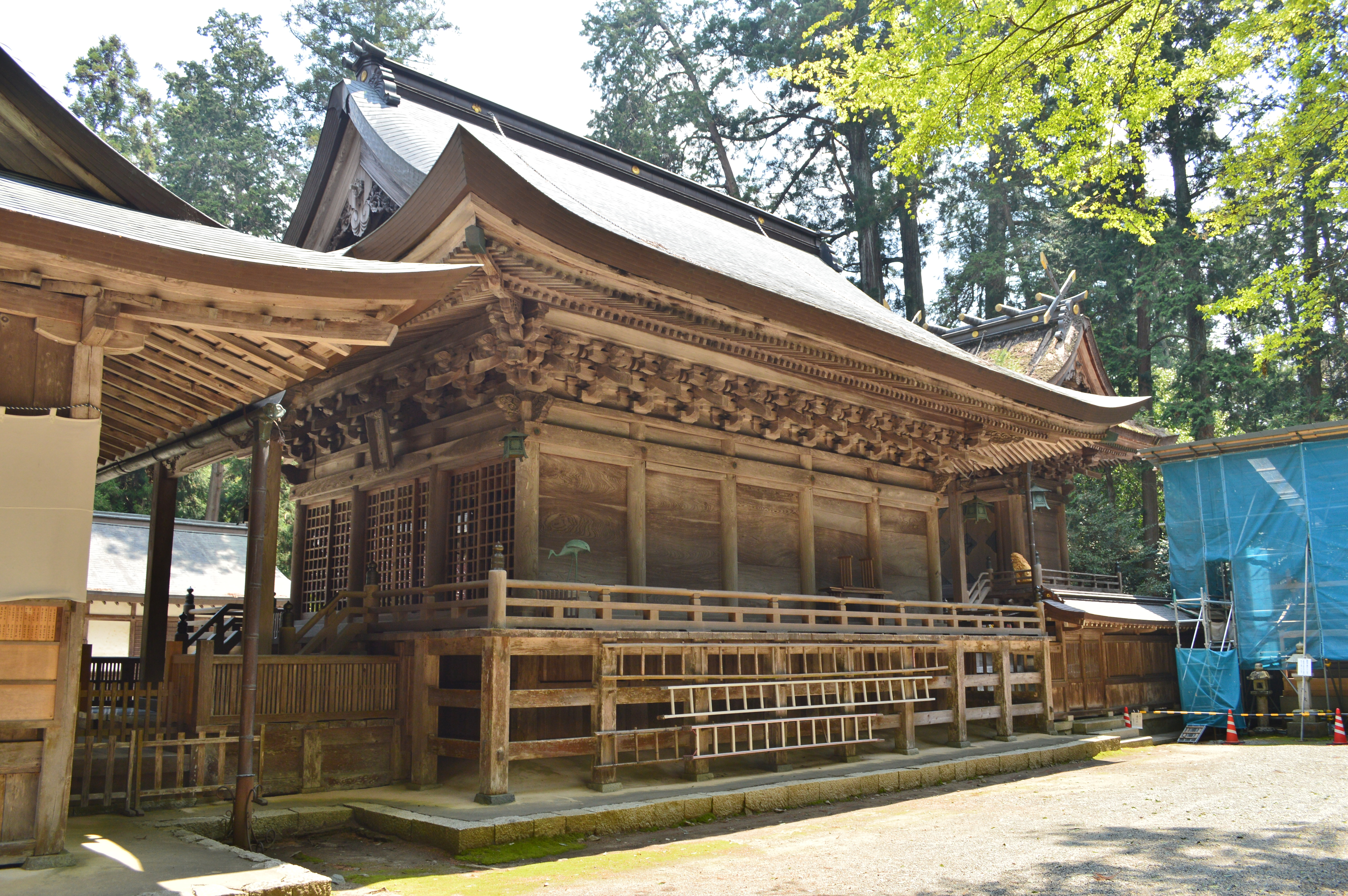
Heiden

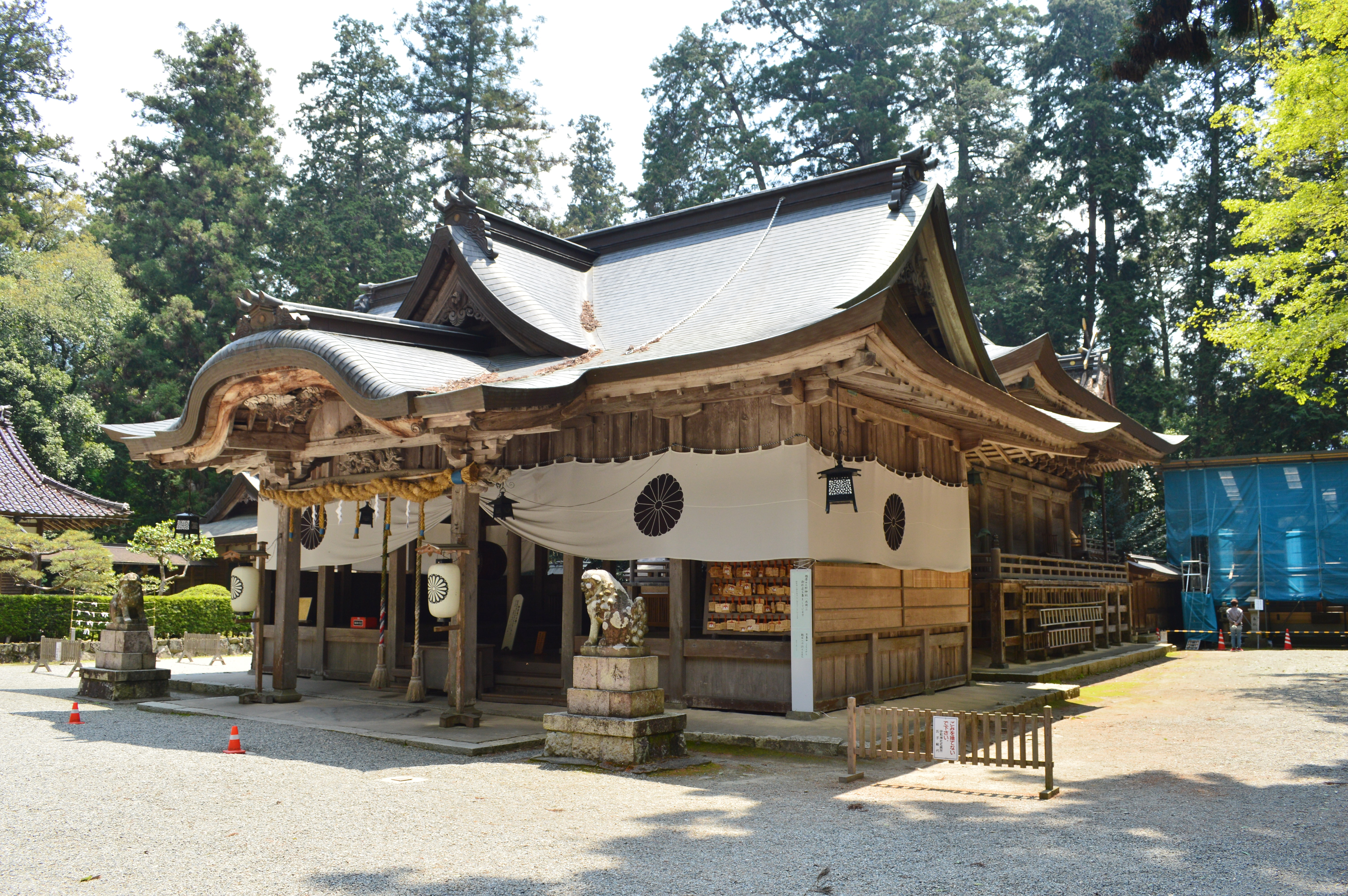
Haiden

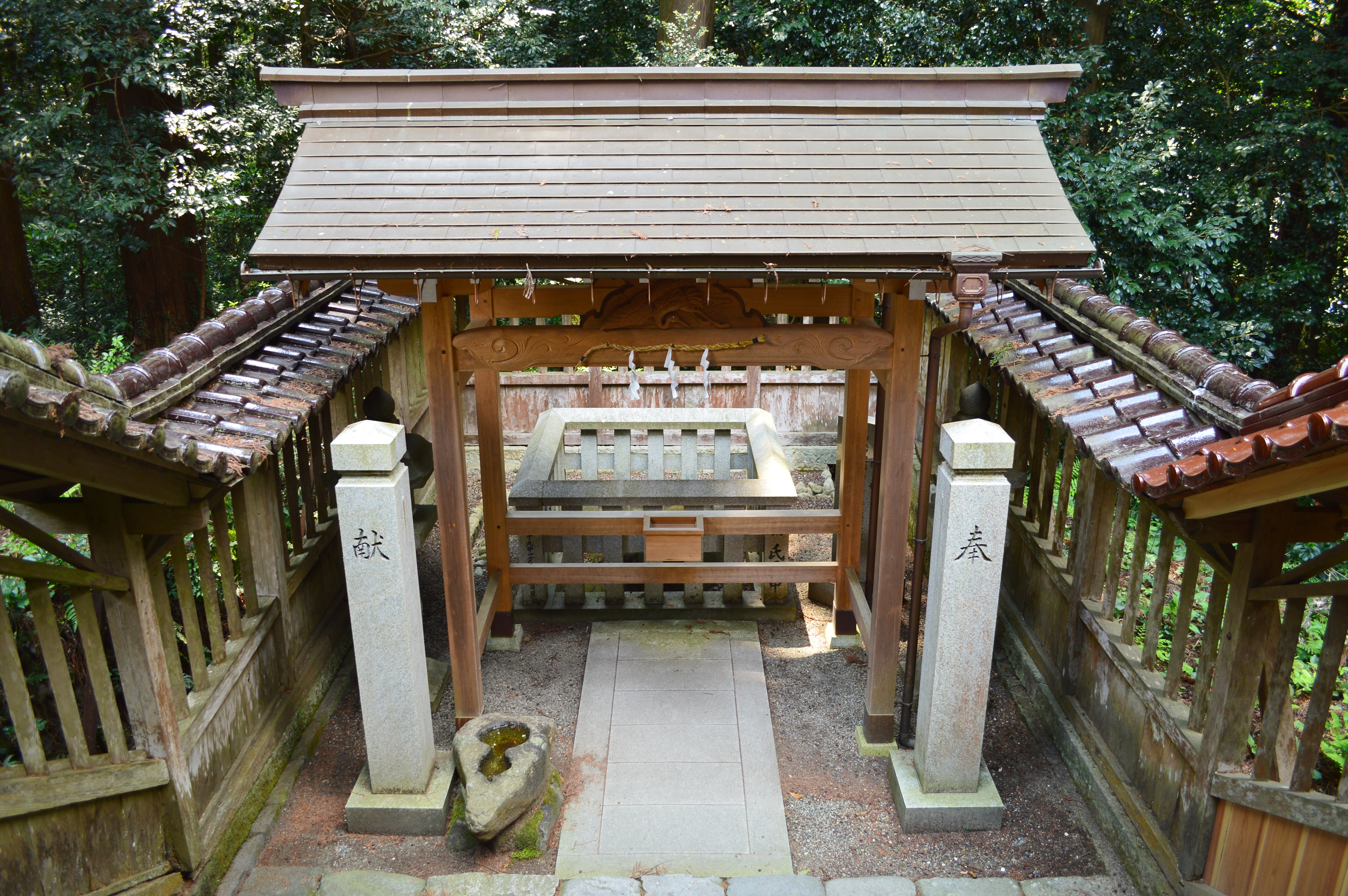
Tsuruishi

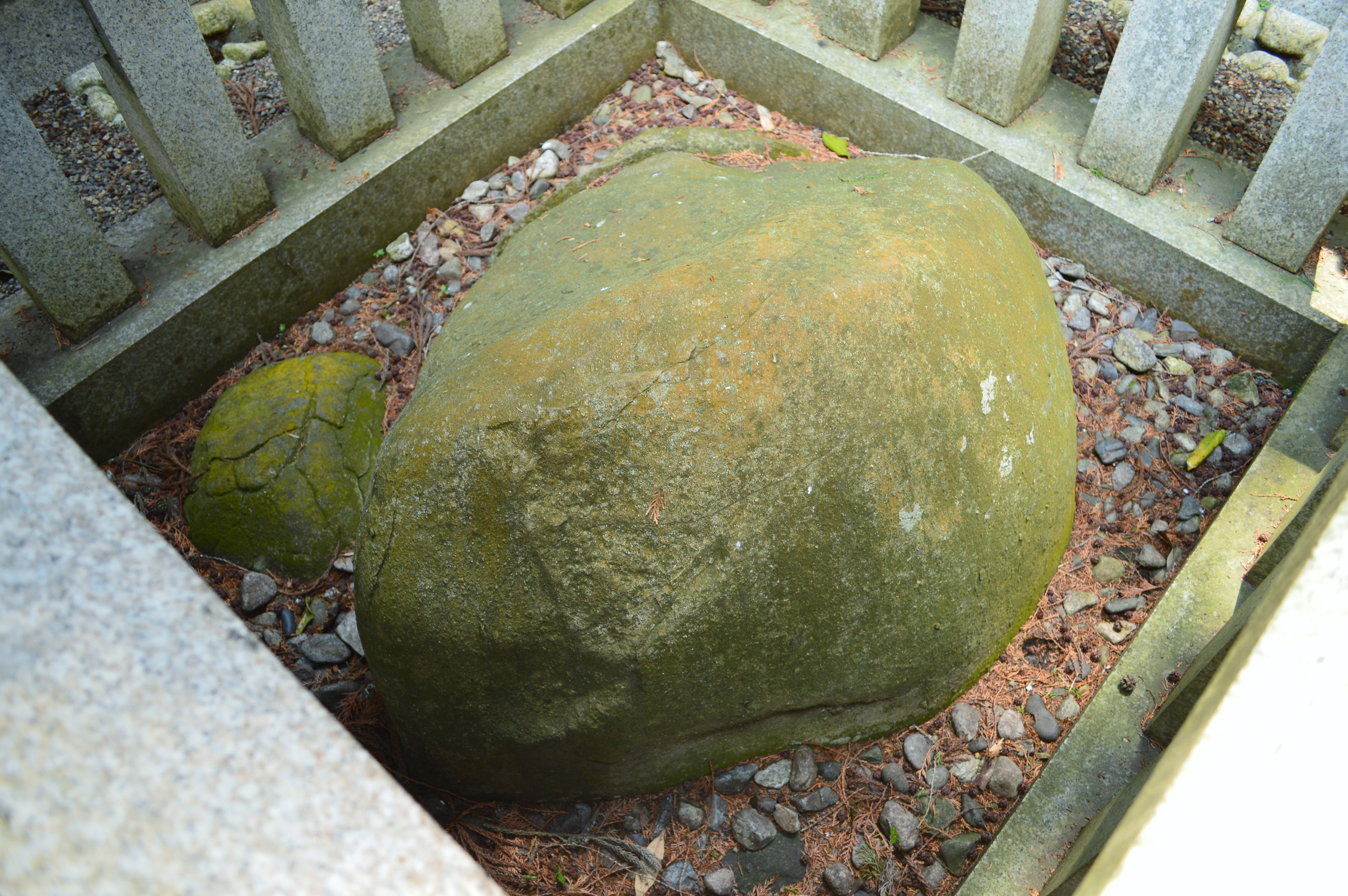
Tsuruishi

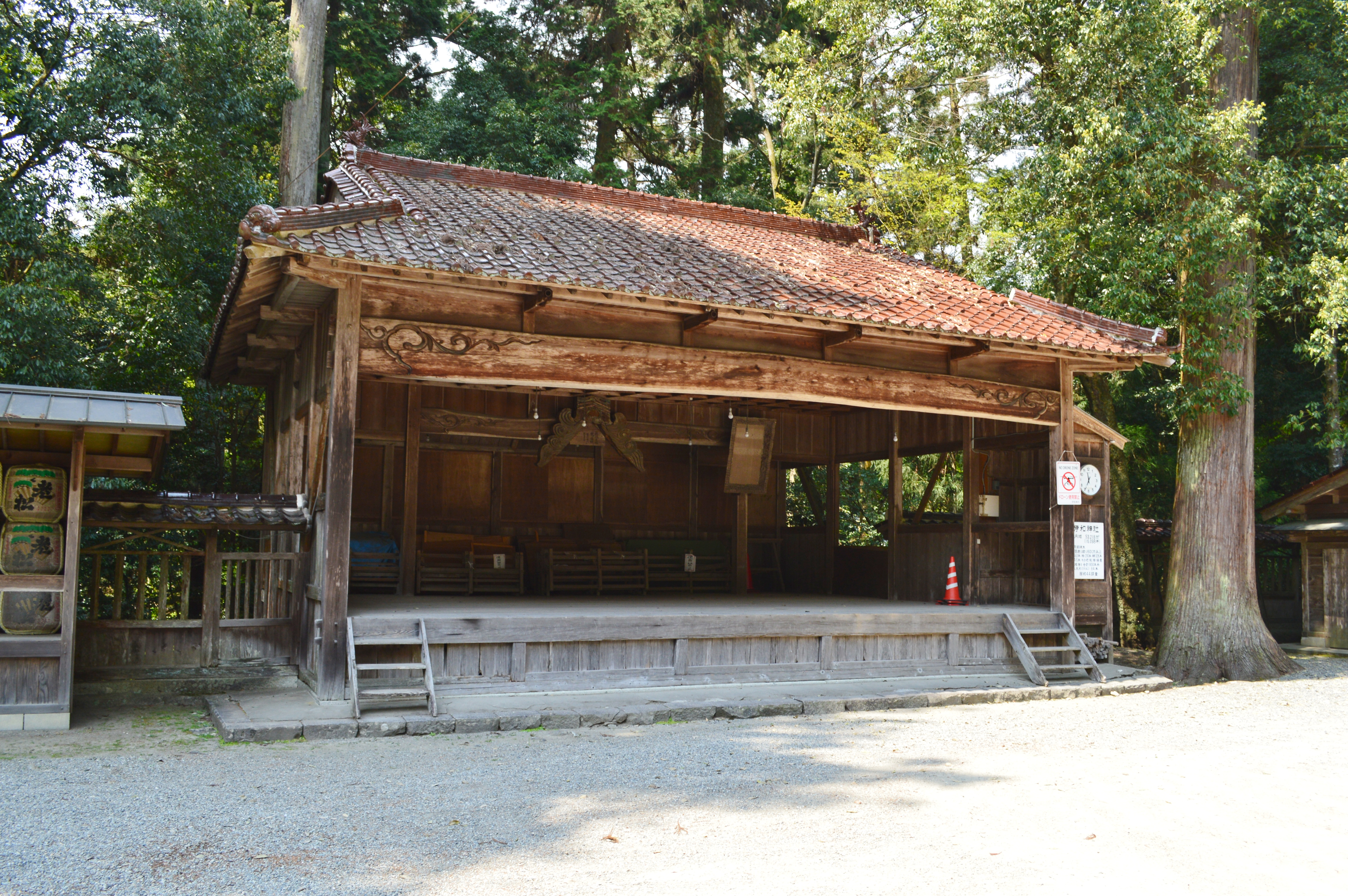
Kagura stage

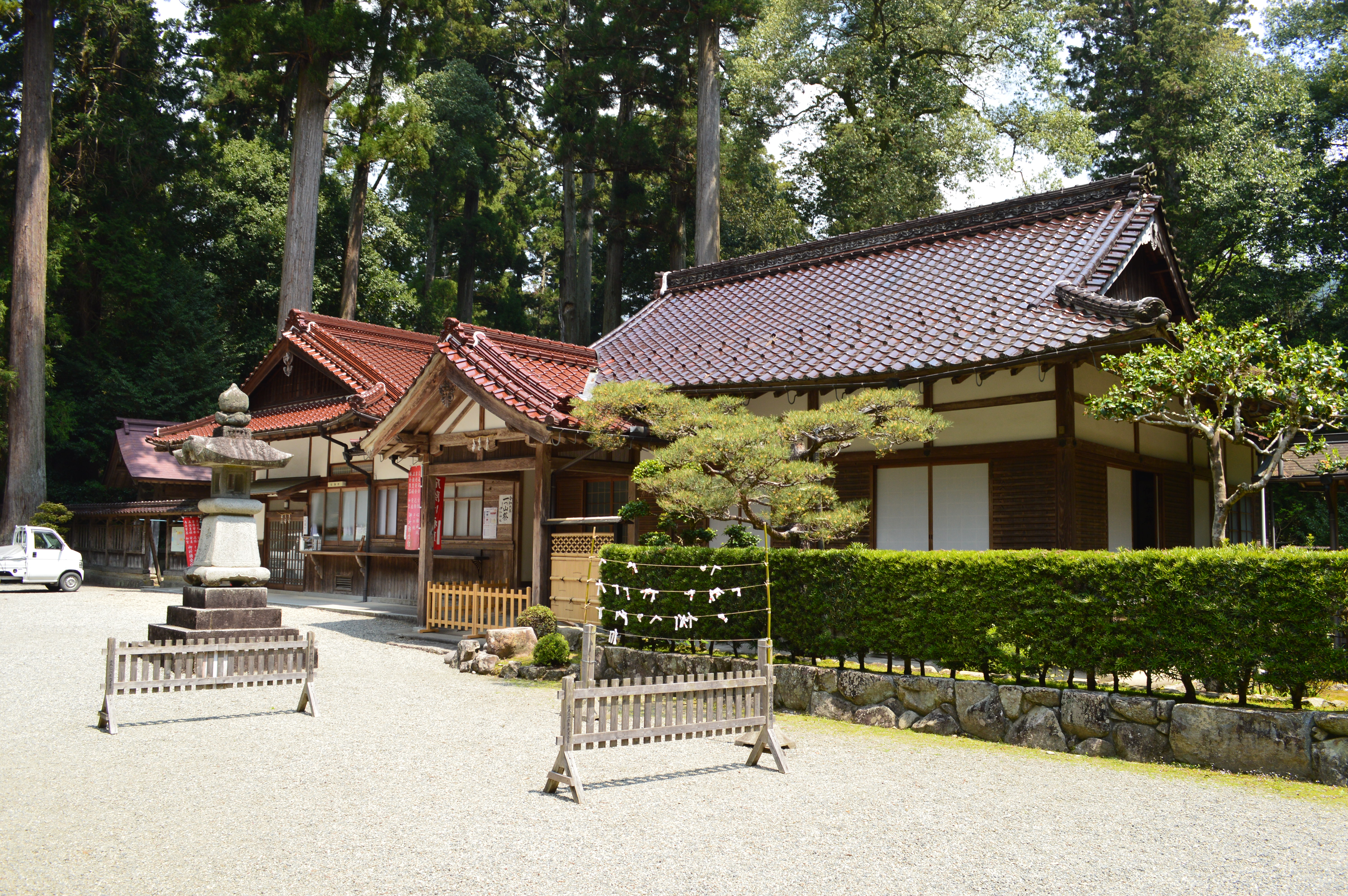
Shine office

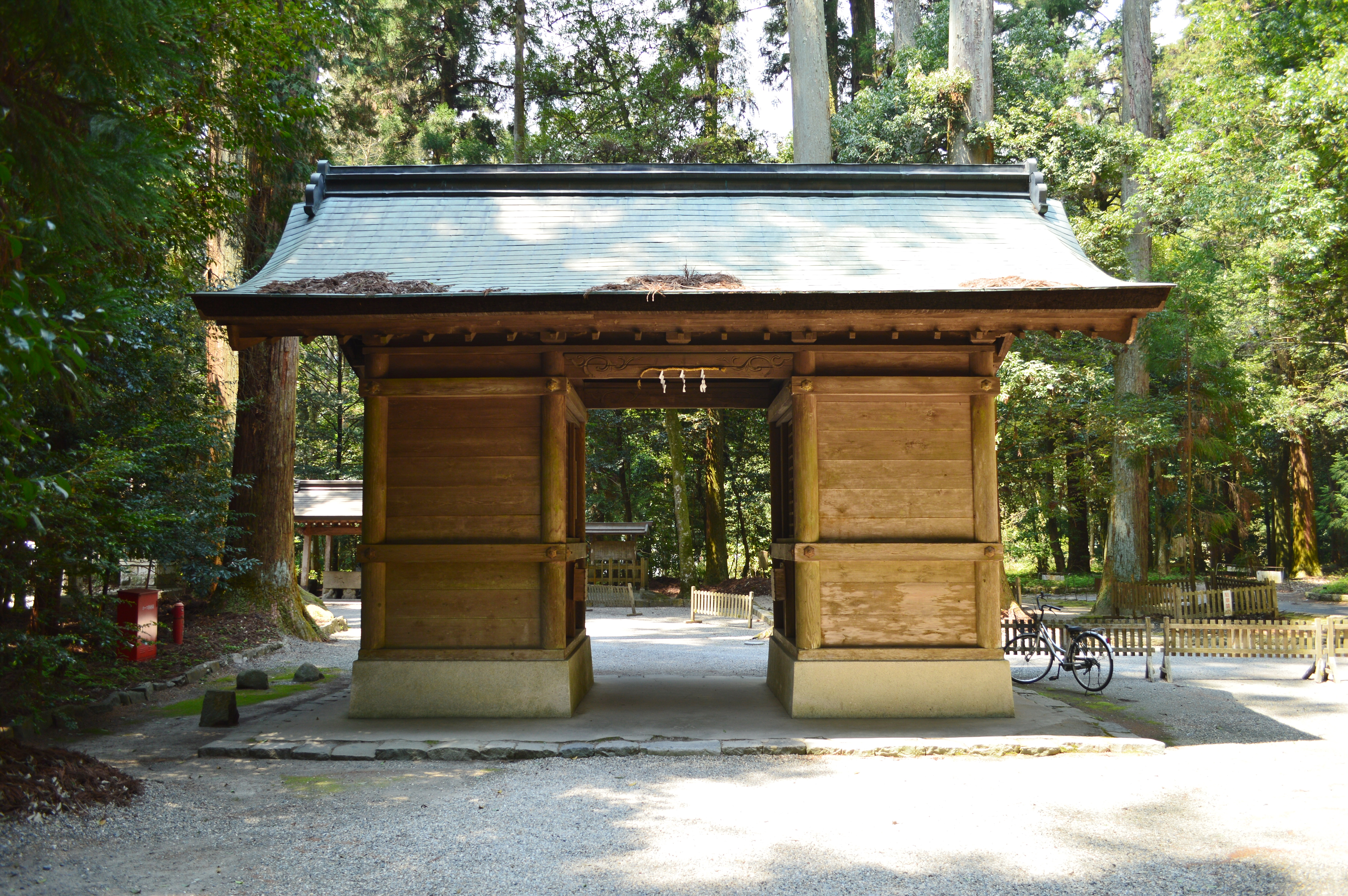
North Gate

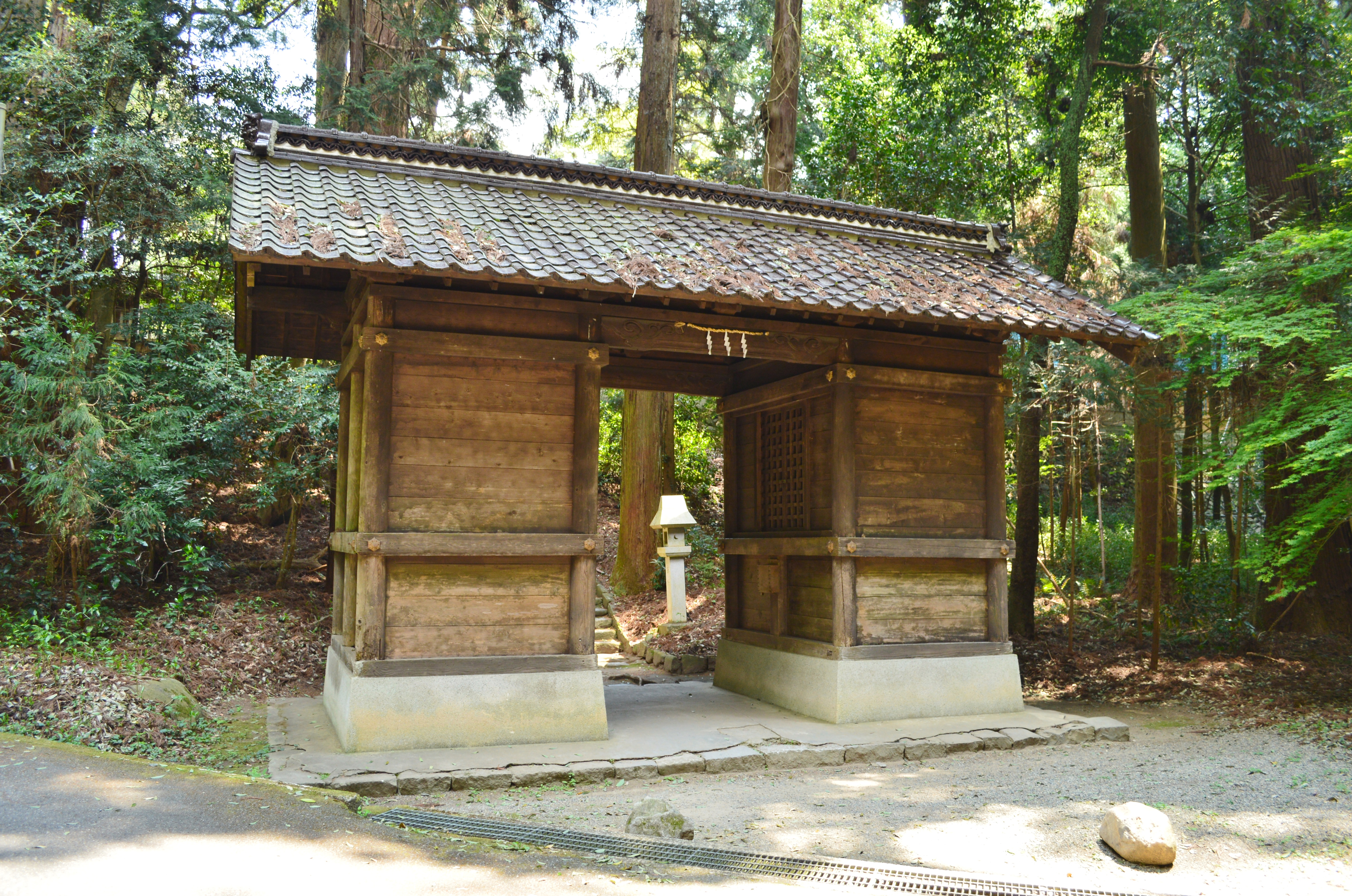
West Gate

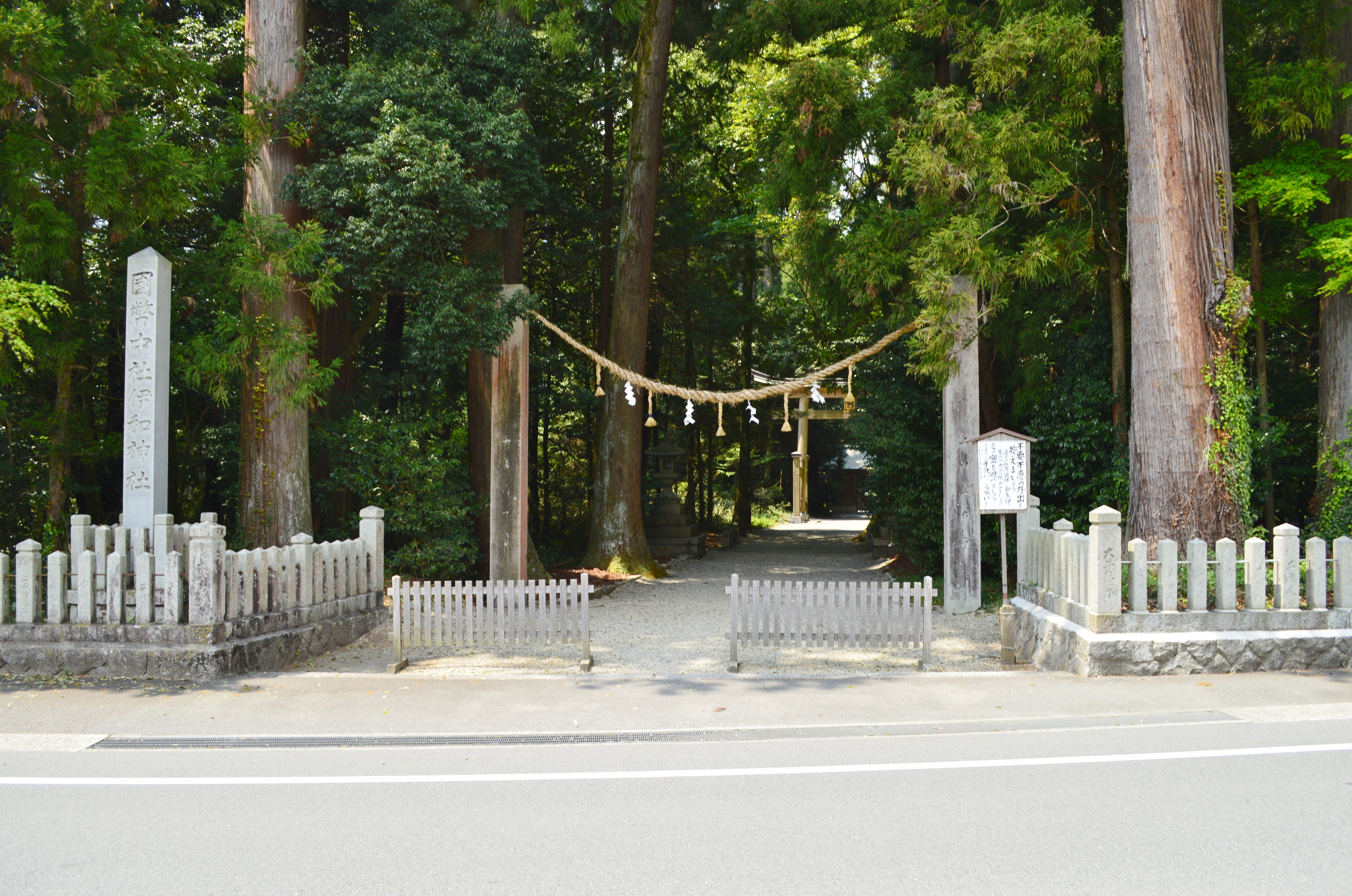
Entry

== See also ==
- Ichinomiya
