= Odai Yorisada =

Odai Yorisada a somewhat minor daimyō during the Sengoku period of the 16th century of Japan. Yorisada was an enemy of the Takeda clan and ended up being defeated by them at one time. After Yorisada was supposedly defeated during this attack by the Takeda, he lit the bridge aflame that led to his castle, in which he committed suicide while on the currently blazing bridge. This act of defiance on Yorisada's part greatly impressed that of Takeda Shingen.
