= Kōdera, Hyōgo =

Dissolved municipality in Hyōgo prefecture, Japan

Kōdera (香寺町, Kōdera-chō) was a town located in Kanzaki District, Hyōgo Prefecture, Japan.

As of 2003, the town had an estimated population of 19,607 and a density of 622.05 persons per km^{2}. The total area was 31.52 km^{2}.

On March 27, 2006, Kōdera, along with the towns of Ieshima and Yumesaki (both from Shikama District), and the town of Yasutomi (from Shisō District), was merged into the expanded city of Himeji and is no longer an independent municipality.
