= Yasutomi, Hyōgo =

Dissolved municipality in Hyōgo prefecture, Japan

Yasutomi (安富町, Yasutomi-chō) was a town located in Shisō District, Hyōgo Prefecture, Japan.

As of 2003, the town had an estimated population of 5,818 and a density of 96.48 persons per km^{2}. The total area was 60.30 km^{2}.

On March 27, 2006, Yasutomi, along with the towns of Ieshima and Yumesaki (both from Shikama District), and the town of Kōdera (from Kanzaki District), was merged into the expanded city of Himeji and is no longer an independent municipality.
