= Mika Yamaji =

Japanese film director (born 1978)

Mika G. Yamaji
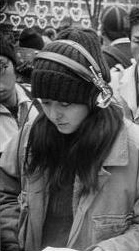
- Yamaji on the set of On the Condition, December 2003
- Born: Mika Gloria Yamaji; January 3, 1978 (age 48); Tokyo, Japan
- Years active: 2003 - present

Mika G. Yamaji (born January 3, 1978) is a film director, screenwriter, poet and author. She graduated from Brown University with a double major in Economics and English literature. At Brown, she wrote and directed her first play, Glock 17. Upon graduation, Mika wrote, directed and two short films in Tokyo with sponsorship from Nikkatsu Studios.

She was also one of the recipients of MDA's Feature Film Fund

She published her first collection of poetry, 86 Benevolent Street in 2010 with the support of a grant from National Arts Council of Singapore.

== Books ==
- 86 Benevolent Street (Firstfruits, 2010) ISBN 978-981-08-6032-5

== Filmography ==
=== Short films ===
- On the Condition (2002) (digital, 18 min.)
- The Perfect Afternoon (2003) (35mm, 10 min.)
- Dreams of a Cafe (2009) (16mm, 3 min.)
- Cherry Red (2009) (HD, 16 min.)
- Hanging Gardens (2010) (Canon 5D Mark II HD, 12 min.)

=== Screenplays ===
- Glock 17
- London Town
- Koi
- Sweet Crude Oil
- Watch My A** (with Sean McCully)
