= Yumesaki, Hyōgo =

Dissolved municipality in Hyōgo prefecture, Japan

Yumesaki (夢前町, Yumesaki-chō) was a town located in Shikama District, Hyōgo Prefecture, Japan.

As of 2003, the town had an estimated population of 21,614 and a density of 147.82 persons per km^{2}. The total area was 146.22 km^{2}.

On March 27, 2006, Yumesaki, along with the town of Ieshima (also from Shikama District), the town of Yasutomi (from Shisō District), and the town of Kōdera (from Kanzaki District), was merged into the expanded city of Himeji and is no longer an independent municipality.

Yumesaki was locally famous for its onsens (hot springs), sakura blossoms in Spring, as well as its hiking grounds, with particularly nice trails along Mount Seppiko. The town bordered the city of Himeji.
