= Shinsaku Yanai =

Japanese writer (born 1947)

Shinsaku Yanai (柳内伸作, Yanai Shinsaku; born 1947 in Fukushima Prefecture, Japan) is a Japanese writer who formerly held the rank of major in the Japan Ground Self-Defense Force.

== Early life ==
Yanai is a graduate of Tokyo Keizai University (東京経済大学) and the Ground Self-Defense Force Research School (陸上自衛隊調査学校), where he took courses in psychological warfare.

== Writing career ==
=== Scandal and exit from SDF ===
In 1992, while still employed by the SDF as an instructor of military history, he published an article in Japanese magazine Shūkan Bunshun in which he suggested that a coup was necessary to clean up corruption in the Japanese political establishment. The incident was described as "an extreme source of embarrassment" for the SDF; the public were more amused than outraged by the article, and even some of Yanai's colleagues anonymously referred to him as a "crackpot". In response, the SDF dismissed Yanai from his post. He was the first officer in any branch of the Self Defense Forces to be dismissed in response to his authorship of a newspaper article.

== Books ==
As well as political writing, Yanai has authored a number of books about shocking torture and execution methods throughout the ages.
