= Yamasaki, Hyōgo =

Former town in Hyōgo Prefecture, Japan

Yamasaki (山崎町, Yamasaki-chō) was a town in Shisō District, Hyōgo, Japan.

== Geography ==
Yamasaki translates as "Mountain Cape", a reference to its seclusion amongst a range of forest-covered mountains. The extensive forest area provides the town's biggest industry, logging.

Yamasaki was about 45 minutes by car from the nearest city, Himeji, which is to the east.

The population was served by a large hospital, the administrative center of Shisō City, and a major intercity highway, the Chūgoku Expressway. There was no rail link, largely dictated by geography. There was one large high school, three junior high schools,

== Population ==
As of 2003, the town had an estimated population of 25,629 and a density of 143.27 persons per km^{2}. The total area was 178.89 km^{2}.

== History ==
On April 1, 2005, Yamasaki, along with the towns of Chikusa, Haga and Ichinomiya (all from Shisō District), was merged to create the city of Shisō and no longer exists as an independent municipality.

The new Shisō City incorporates a number of local townships and villages, most significantly the castle town of Haga and Chikusa.

Yamasaki has existed as a town for about fifty years, but the area has been occupied since the Ōnin period in the fifteenth century, as its ancient "Hachiman Shrine" denotes. Today, it includes substantial rice paddy cultivation.

Yamazaki Anzai, an important Confucian scholar, had ancestry in the area and was Yamasaki's best known personage.
