= Economic history of Japan =

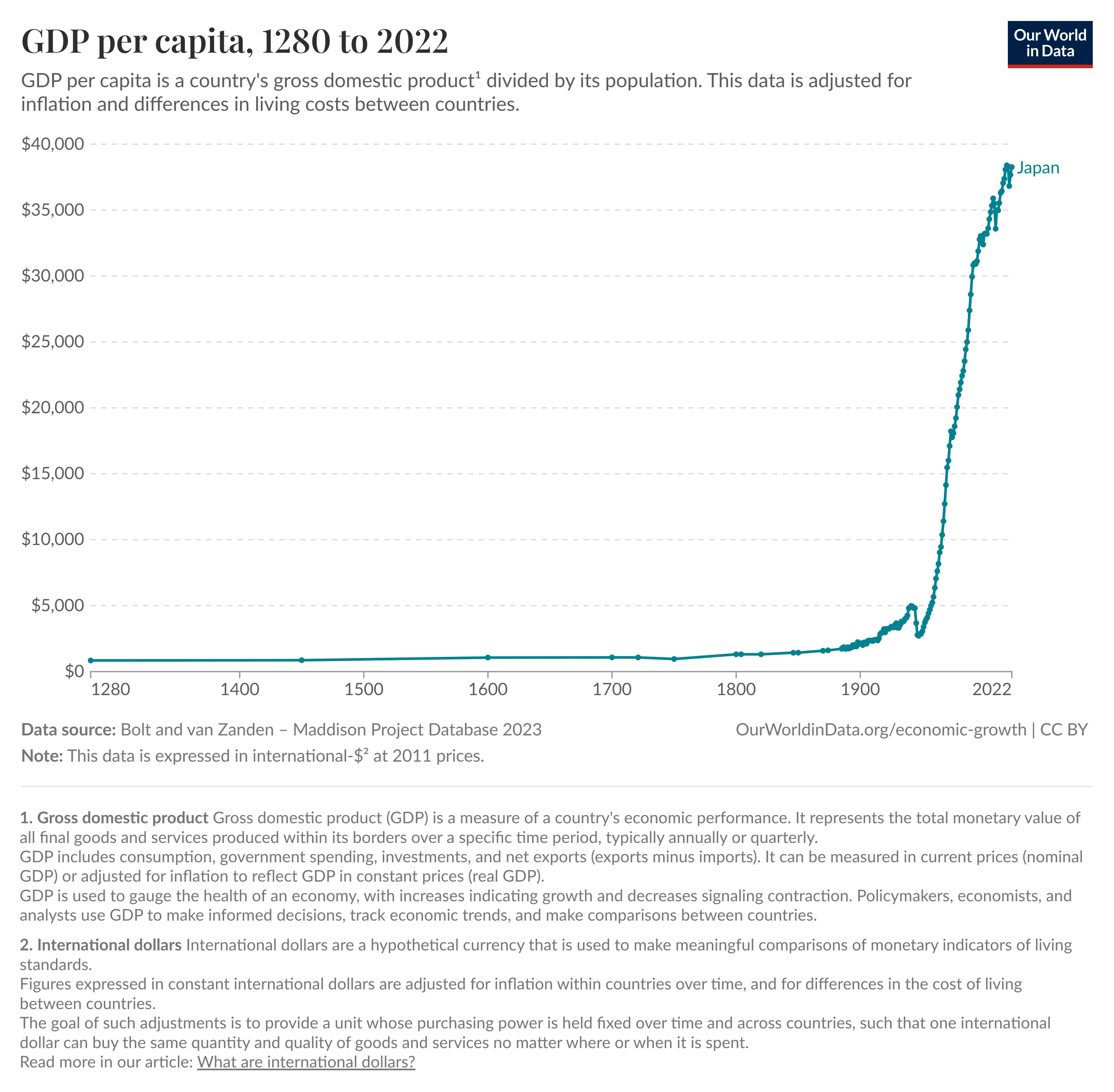
Historical GDP per capita development

The economic history of Japan concerns the development of the economy of Japan from ancient times to the present. Early Japanese society was primarily agricultural, although trade with mainland Asia introduced new technologies and cultural influences. Following the rise of the Imperial House and increasing political centralization, Japan developed systems of taxation, administration, and currency influenced by China, including the introduction of the Wadōkaichin coinage during the classical period.

During the era of Feudal Japan, improvements in agriculture and commerce contributed to population growth and economic expansion. The economy gradually shifted from barter to greater use of currency, while foreign trade increased following contact with European merchants in the 16th century, particularly the Portuguese. In the mid-17th century, the Tokugawa shogunate adopted the policy of Sakoku, restricting foreign relations and trade for more than two centuries.

The collapse of the Tokugawa shogunate and the reforms of the Meiji era led to rapid industrialization and modernization. By the early 20th century, Japan had developed major industrial sectors, including steel and aircraft manufacturing. Industrial growth continued during Japan's military expansion and involvement in World War I and World War II. The war ultimately devastated the Japanese economy, causing widespread destruction and severe disruption to infrastructure and transportation.

Following the Allied occupation of Japan, economic reforms and assistance from the United States contributed to rapid postwar growth. During the second half of the 20th century, manufacturing and consumer industries became central to the Japanese economy. After the economic slowdown and deflation of the 1990s, the Japanese government adopted policies such as quantitative easing.

== Prehistoric and ancient Japan ==
=== Jōmon period ===
In Japanese history, the Jōmon period (縄文 時代, Jōmon jidai) is the time between c. 14,000 and 300 BCE, during which Japan was inhabited by a diverse hunter-gatherer and early agriculturalist population united through a common Jōmon culture, which reached a considerable degree of sedentism and cultural complexity. The pottery style characteristic of the first phases of Jōmon culture was decorated by impressing cords into the surface of wet clay and is generally accepted to be among the oldest in the world. The Jōmon period was rich in tools and jewelry made from bone, stone, shell and antler; pottery figurines and vessels; and lacquerware.

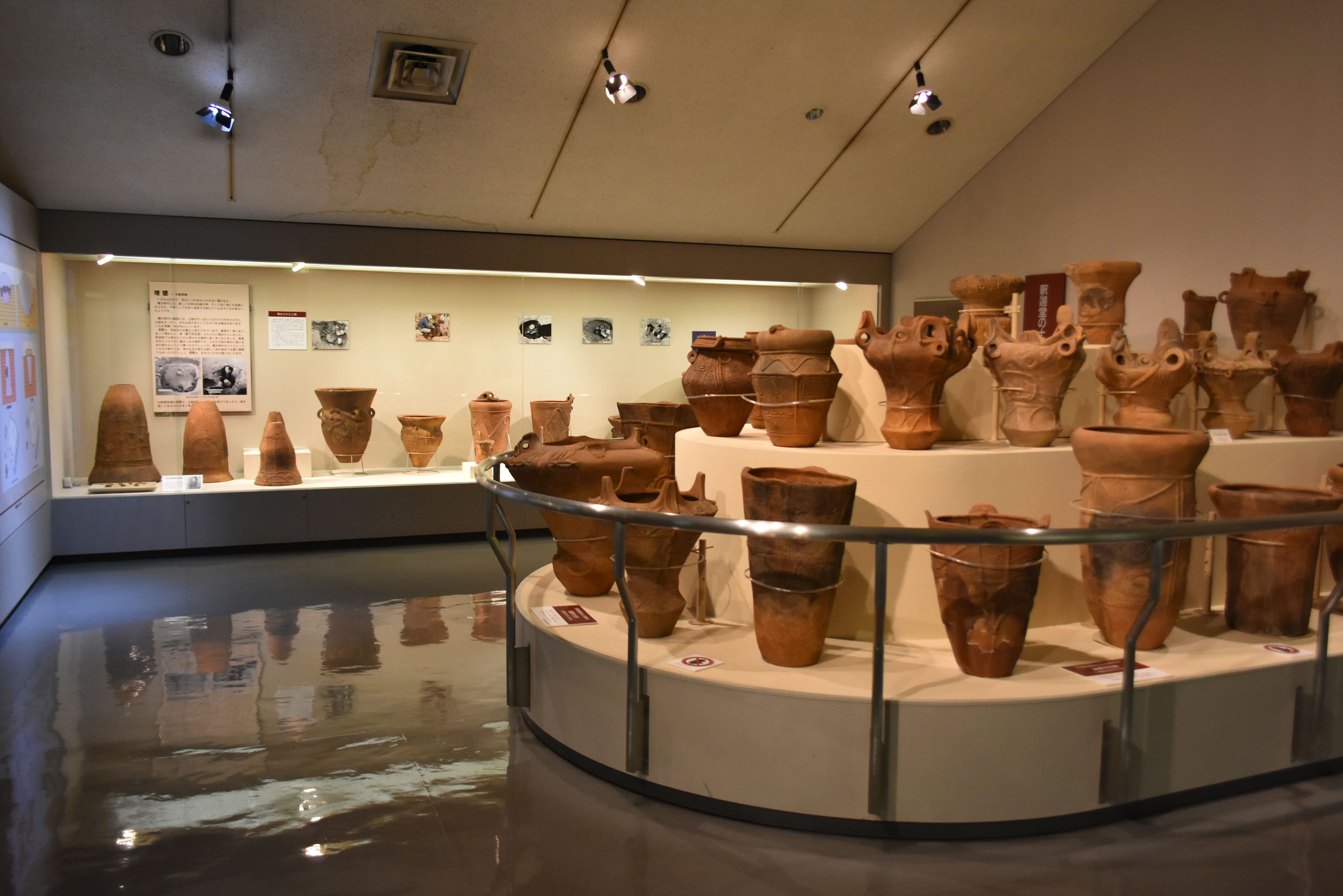
Jōmon pottery in the Yamanashi museum

Archaeologist Junko Habu claims "[t]he majority of Japanese scholars believed, and still believe, that pottery production was first invented in mainland Asia and subsequently introduced into the Japanese archipelago." This seems to be confirmed by recent archaeology. As of now, the earliest pottery vessels in the world date back to 20 000 BP and were discovered in Xianren Cave in Jiangxi, China. The pottery may have been used as cookware. Other early pottery vessels include those excavated from the Yuchanyan Cave in southern China, dated from 16 000 BCE, and at present it appears that pottery emerged at roughly the same time in Japan, and in the Amur River basin of the Russian Far East. The manufacture of pottery typically implies some form of sedentary life because pottery is heavy, bulky, and fragile and thus generally unusable for hunter-gatherers. However, this does not seem to have been the case with the first Jōmon people, who perhaps numbered 20,000 individuals over the whole archipelago.

The degree to which horticulture or small-scale agriculture was practiced by Jōmon people is debated. Currently there is no scientific consensus to support a conceptualization of Jōmon period culture as only hunter-gatherer. There is evidence to suggest that arboriculture was practiced. An apparently domesticated variety of peach appeared very early at Jōmon sites in 6700–6400 BP (4700–4400 BC). This was already similar to modern cultivated forms. This domesticated type of peach was apparently brought into Japan from China. Nevertheless, in China, itself, this variety is currently attested only at a later date of 5300–4300 BP.

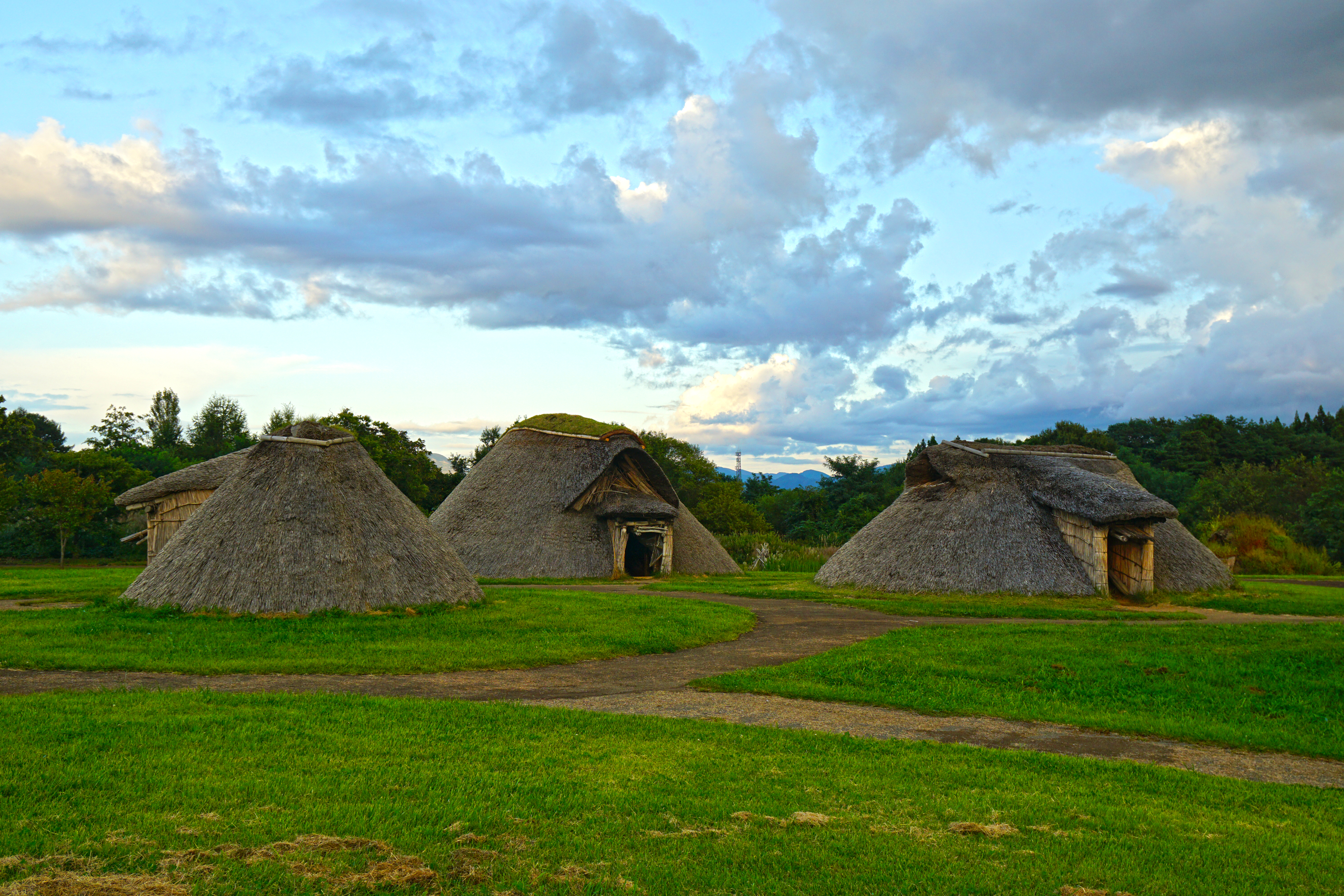
Reconstruction of Jōmon period pit-houses in the Aomori Prefecture

The Middle Jōmon period (3520–2470 BCE) saw a rise in complexity in the design of pit-houses, the most commonly used method of housing at the time, with some even having paved stone floors. At the end of the Jōmon period the local population declined sharply. Scientists suggest that this was possibly caused by food shortages and other environmental problems. They concluded that not all Jōmon groups suffered under these circumstances but the overall population declined. Examining the remains of the people who lived throughout the Jōmon period, there is evidence that these deaths were not inflicted by warfare or violence on a large enough scale to cause these deaths.

=== Yayoi period ===
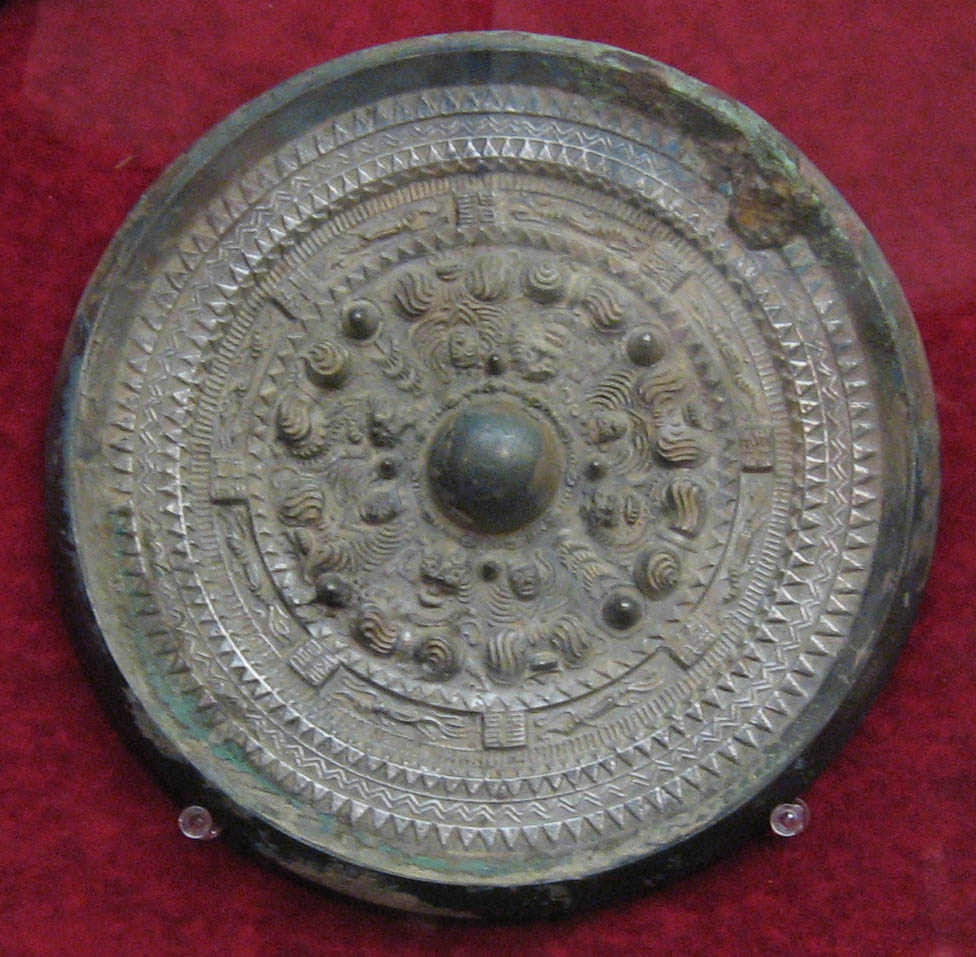
Shinju-kyo bronze mirror from Yayoi period excavated in Tsubai-otsukayama kofun, Yamashiro, Kyoto

The Yayoi period is generally accepted to date from 300 BCE to 300 CE. However, radio-carbon evidence suggests a date up to 500 years earlier, between 1,000 and 800 BCE. During this period Japan transitioned to a settled agricultural society. As the Yayoi population increased, the society became more stratified and complex. They wove textiles, lived in permanent farming villages, and constructed buildings with wood and stone. They also accumulated wealth through land ownership and the storage of grain. Such factors promoted the development of distinct social classes. Yayoi chiefs, in some parts of Kyūshū, appear to have sponsored, and politically manipulated, trade in bronze and other prestige objects. That was made possible by the introduction of an irrigated, wet-rice agriculture from the Yangtze estuary in southern China via the Ryukyu Islands or Korean Peninsula.

=== Kofun period (250–538) ===
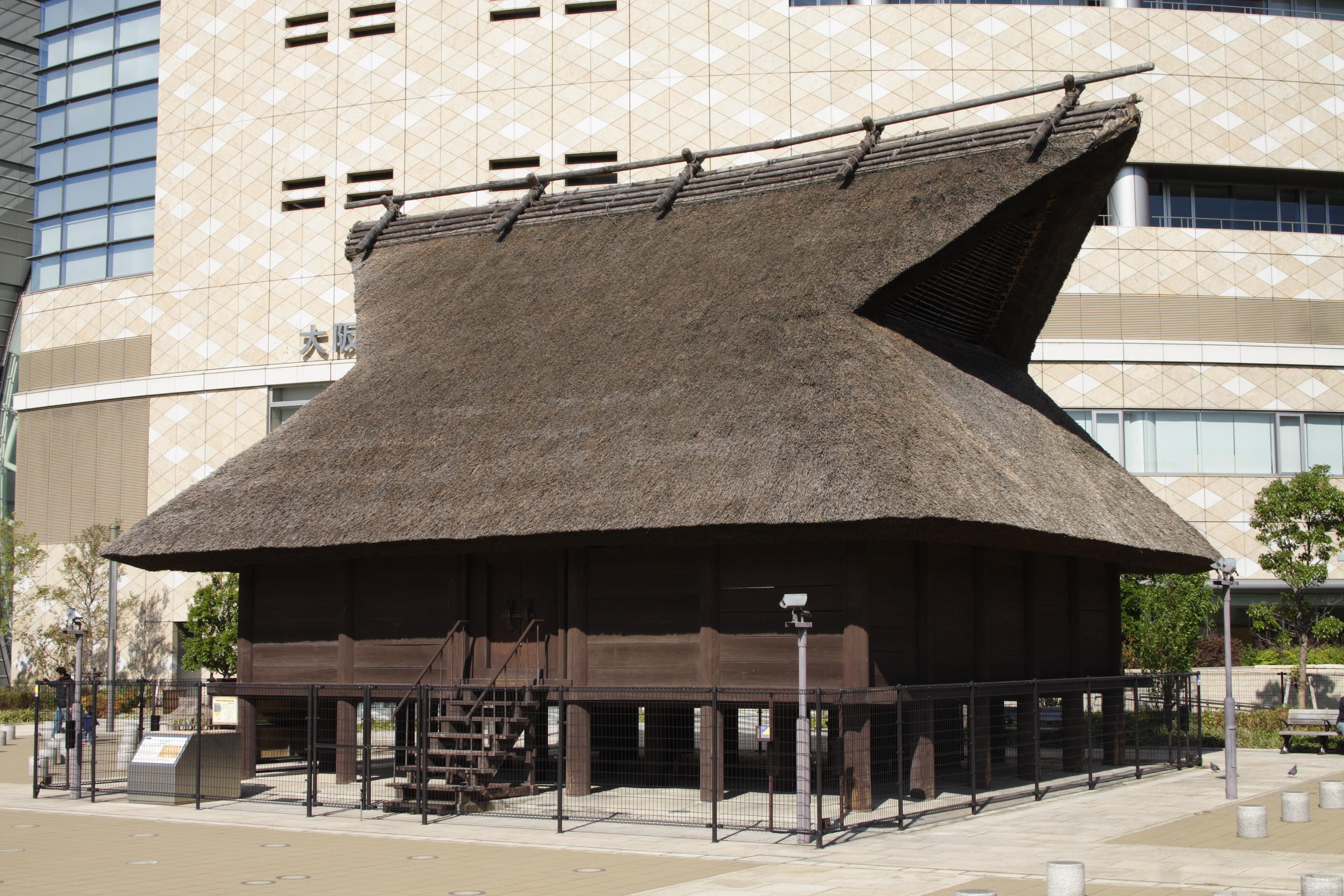
Reconstructed Kofun-era warehouse

The Kofun period recorded Japan's earliest political centralization, when the Yamato clan rose to power in southwestern Japan, established the Imperial House, and helped control trade routes across the region. Much of the material culture of the Kofun period demonstrates that Japan was in close political and economic contact with continental Asia (especially with the southern dynasties of China) via the Korean Peninsula; bronze mirrors cast from the same mould have been found on both sides of the Tsushima Strait. Irrigation, sericulture, and weaving were brought to Japan by Chinese immigrants, who are mentioned in ancient Japanese histories; the Chinese Hata clan (秦; read "Qín" in Chinese) introduced sericulture and certain types of weaving.

== Classical Japan ==
=== Asuka period (538–710) ===
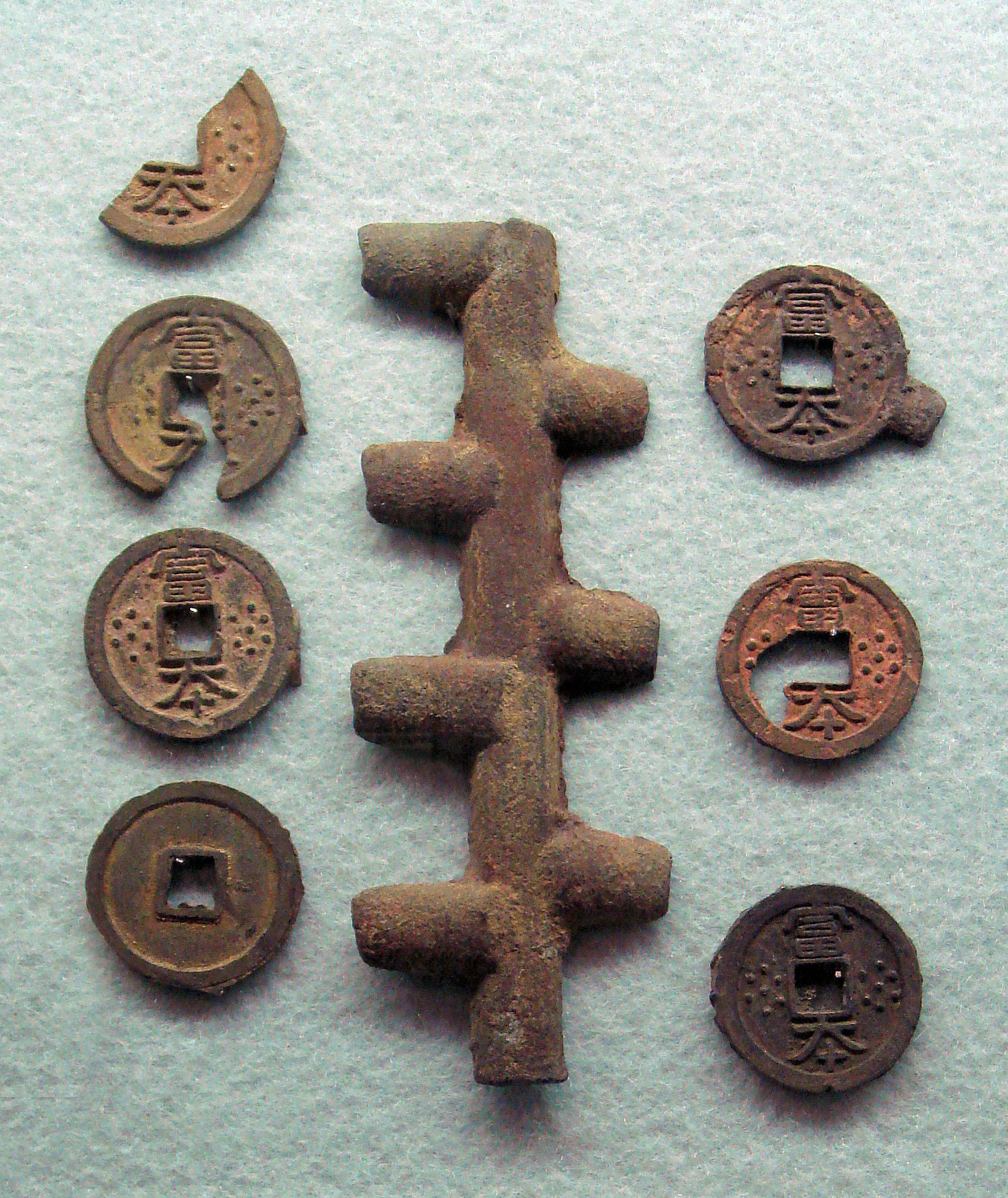
Copper 'Fuhonsen (富本銭) coinage from the 7th century, Asuka period

The Yamato polity evolved greatly during the Asuka period, which was concentrated in the Asuka region and exercised power over clans in Kyūshū and Honshū, bestowing titles, some hereditary, on clan chieftains. The Yamato name became synonymous with all of Japan as the Yamato rulers suppressed other clans and acquired agricultural lands. Based on Chinese models (including the adoption of the Chinese written language), they developed a system of trade roads and a central administration. By the mid-seventh century, the agricultural lands had grown to a substantial public domain, subject to central policy. The basic administrative unit of the Gokishichidō (五畿七道; "five cities, seven roads") system was the county, and society was organized into occupation groups. Most people were farmers; others were fishers, weavers, potters, artisans, armorers, and ritual specialists.

In 645, the Soga clan were overthrown in a coup launched by Prince Naka no Ōe and Fujiwara no Kamatari, the founder of the Fujiwara clan. Their government devised and implemented the far-reaching Taika Reforms. The Reform began with land reform, based on Confucian ideas and philosophies from China. It nationalized all land in Japan, to be distributed equally among cultivators, and ordered the compilation of a household registry as the basis for a new system of taxation. What were once called "private lands and private people" (私地私民, shichi shimin) became "public lands and public people" (公地公民, kōchi kōmin), as the court now sought to assert its control over all of Japan and to make the people direct subjects of the throne. Land was no longer hereditary but reverted to the state at the death of the owner. Taxes were levied on harvests and on silk, cotton, cloth, thread, and other products. A corvée (labor) tax was established for military conscription and building public works.

Wadōkaichin (和同開珎) is the oldest official Japanese coinage, having been minted starting on 29 August 708 on order of Empress Genmei. Inspired by the Chinese Tang dynasty coinage Kaiyuan Tongbao, the Wadōkaichin began being produced following the discovery of large copper deposits in Japan during the early 8th century.

=== Nara period (710–794) ===
Gokishichidō system showing ancient regions and provinces during the Nara period after the introduction of the Yōrō Code (720): Kinai / Tōkaidō / Tōsandō / Hokurikudō; San'indō / San'yōdō / Nankaidō / Saikaidō

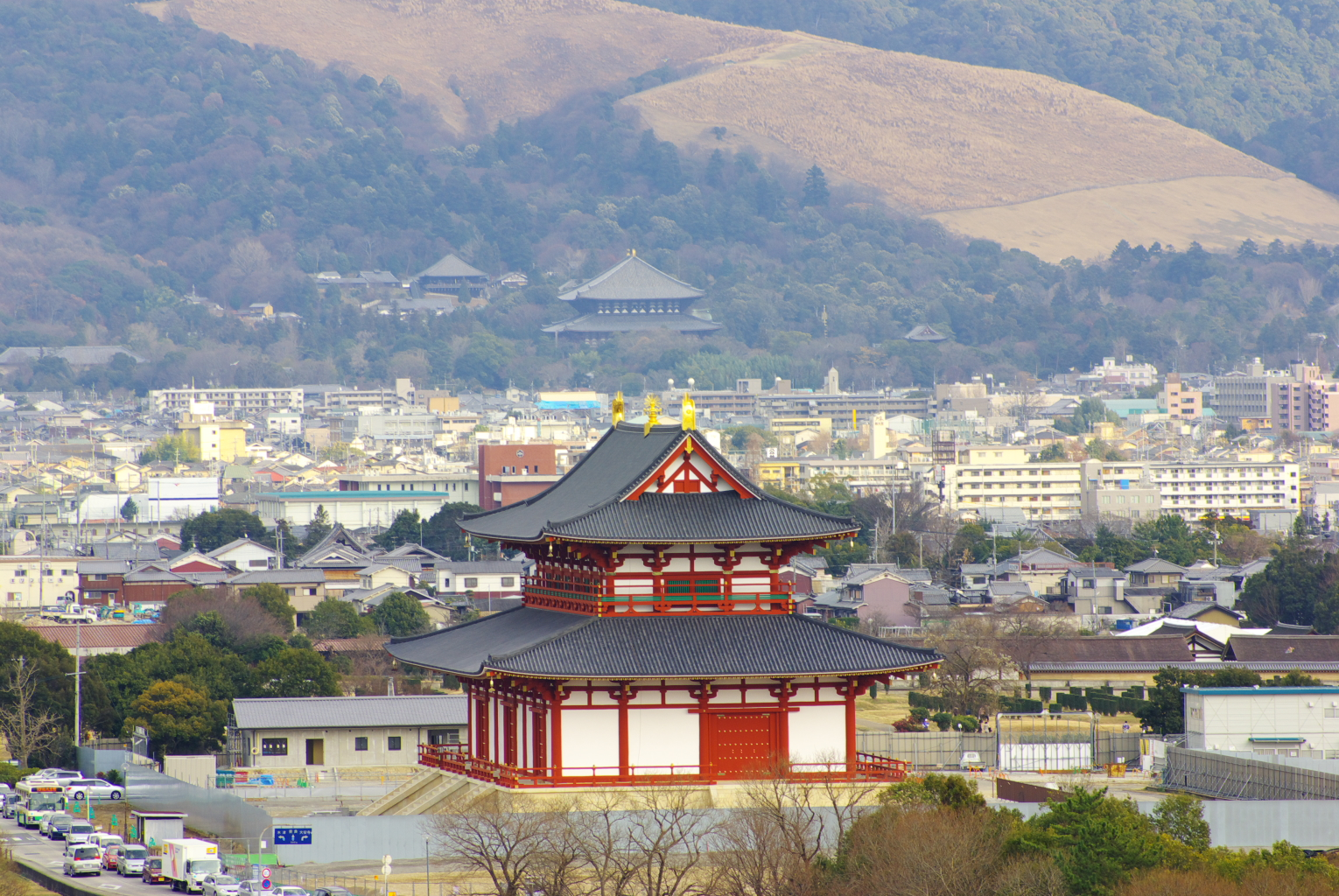
The primary building, i.e. the Daigoku-den at the Heijō Palace (In the center of the photograph: this is a modern version built for the 1300th anniversary of Nara becoming Japan's capital). Tōdai-ji's Daibutsuden and Wakakusayama can be seen in the rear (January 2010).

Before the Taihō Code was established, the capital was customarily moved after the death of an emperor because of the ancient belief that a place of death was polluted. Reforms and bureaucratization of government led to the establishment of a permanent imperial capital at Heijō-kyō, or Nara, in AD 710. The capital was moved shortly (for reasons described later in this section) to Kuni-kyō (present-day Kizugawa) in 740–744, to Naniwa-kyō (present-day Osaka) in 744–745, to Shigarakinomiya (紫香楽宮, present-day Shigaraki) in 745, and moved back to Nara in 745. Nara was Japan's first truly urban center. It soon had a population of 200,000 (representing nearly 7% of the country's population) and some 10,000 people worked in government jobs.

Economic and administrative activity increased during the Nara period. Roads linked Nara to provincial capitals, and taxes were collected more efficiently and routinely. Coins were minted, if not widely used. Outside the Nara area, however, there was little commercial activity, and in the provinces the old Shōtoku land reform systems declined. By the mid-eighth century, shōen (landed estates), one of the most important economic institutions in prehistoric Japan, began to rise as a result of the search for a more manageable form of landholding. Local administration gradually became more self-sufficient, while the breakdown of the old land distribution system and the rise of taxes led to the loss or abandonment of land by many people who became the "wave people" (furōsha). Some of these formerly "public people" were privately employed by large landholders, and "public lands" increasingly reverted to the shōen.

Factional fighting at the imperial court continued throughout the Nara period. Imperial family members, leading court families, such as the Fujiwara, and Buddhist priests all contended for influence. Earlier during this period, Prince Nagaya seized power at the court after the death of Fujiwara no Fuhito. Fuhito was succeeded by four sons, Muchimaro, Umakai, Fusasaki, and Maro. They put Emperor Shōmu, the prince by Fuhito's daughter, on the throne. In 729, they arrested Nagaya and regained control. However, as a major outbreak of smallpox spread from Kyūshū in 735, all four brothers died two years later, resulting in temporary reduction in the Fujiwara dominance. In 740, a member of the Fujiwara clan, Hirotsugu, launched a rebellion from his base in Fukuoka, Kyushu. Although defeated, it is without doubt that the Emperor was heavily shocked about these events, and he moved the palace three times in only five years from 740, until he eventually returned to Nara. In the late Nara period, financial burdens on the state increased, and the court began dismissing nonessential officials. In 792 universal conscription was abandoned, and district heads were allowed to establish private militia forces for local police work. Decentralization of authority became the rule despite the reforms of the Nara period. Eventually, to return control to imperial hands, the capital was moved in 784 to Nagaoka-kyō and in 794 to Heian-kyō (literally Capital of Peace and Tranquility), about twenty-six kilometers north of Nara. By the late eleventh century, the city was popularly called Kyoto (capital city), the name it has had ever since.

=== Heian period (794–1185) ===
While on one hand, the Heian period was an unusually long period of prosperity, it can also be argued that the period weakened Japan economically and led to poverty for all but a tiny few of its inhabitants. The control of rice fields provided a key source of income for families such as the Fujiwara and was a fundamental base for their power. The aristocratic beneficiaries of Heian culture, the Ryōmin (良民 "Good People") numbered about five thousand in a land of perhaps five million. One reason the samurai were able to take power was that the ruling nobility proved incompetent at managing Japan and its provinces. By the year 1000, the government no longer knew how to issue currency and money was gradually disappearing. Instead of a fully realized system of money circulation, rice was the primary unit of exchange.

Throughout the Heian period, the power of the imperial court declined. The court became so self-absorbed with power struggles, and with the artistic pursuits of court nobles, that it neglected the administration of government outside the capital. The nationalization of land undertaken as part of the ritsuryō state decayed as various noble families and religious orders succeeded in securing tax-exempt status for their private shōen manors By the eleventh century, more land in Japan was controlled by shōen owners than by the central government. The imperial court was thus deprived of the tax revenue to pay for its national army. In response, the owners of the shōen set up their own armies of samurai warriors. Two powerful noble families that had descended from branches of the imperial family, the Taira and Minamoto clans, acquired large armies and many shōen outside the capital. The central government began to use these two warrior clans to suppress rebellions and piracy. Japan's population stabilized during the late-Heian period after hundreds of years of decline.

== Feudal Japan ==
=== Kamakura period (1185–1333) ===
The samurai armies of the whole nation were mobilized in 1274 and 1281 to confront two full-scale invasions launched by Kublai Khan of the Mongol Empire. Though outnumbered by an enemy equipped with superior weaponry, the Japanese fought the Mongols to a standstill in Kyushu on both occasions until the Mongol fleet was destroyed by typhoons called kamikaze, meaning "divine wind". In spite of the Kamakura shogunate's victory, the defense so depleted its finances that it was unable to provide compensation to its vassals for their role in the victory. This had permanent negative consequences for the shogunate's relations with the samurai class. Japan nevertheless entered a period of prosperity and population growth starting around 1250. In rural areas, the greater use of iron tools and fertilizer, improved irrigation techniques, and double-cropping increased productivity and rural villages grew. Fewer famines and epidemics allowed cities to grow and commerce to boom.

=== Muromachi period (1333–1568) ===
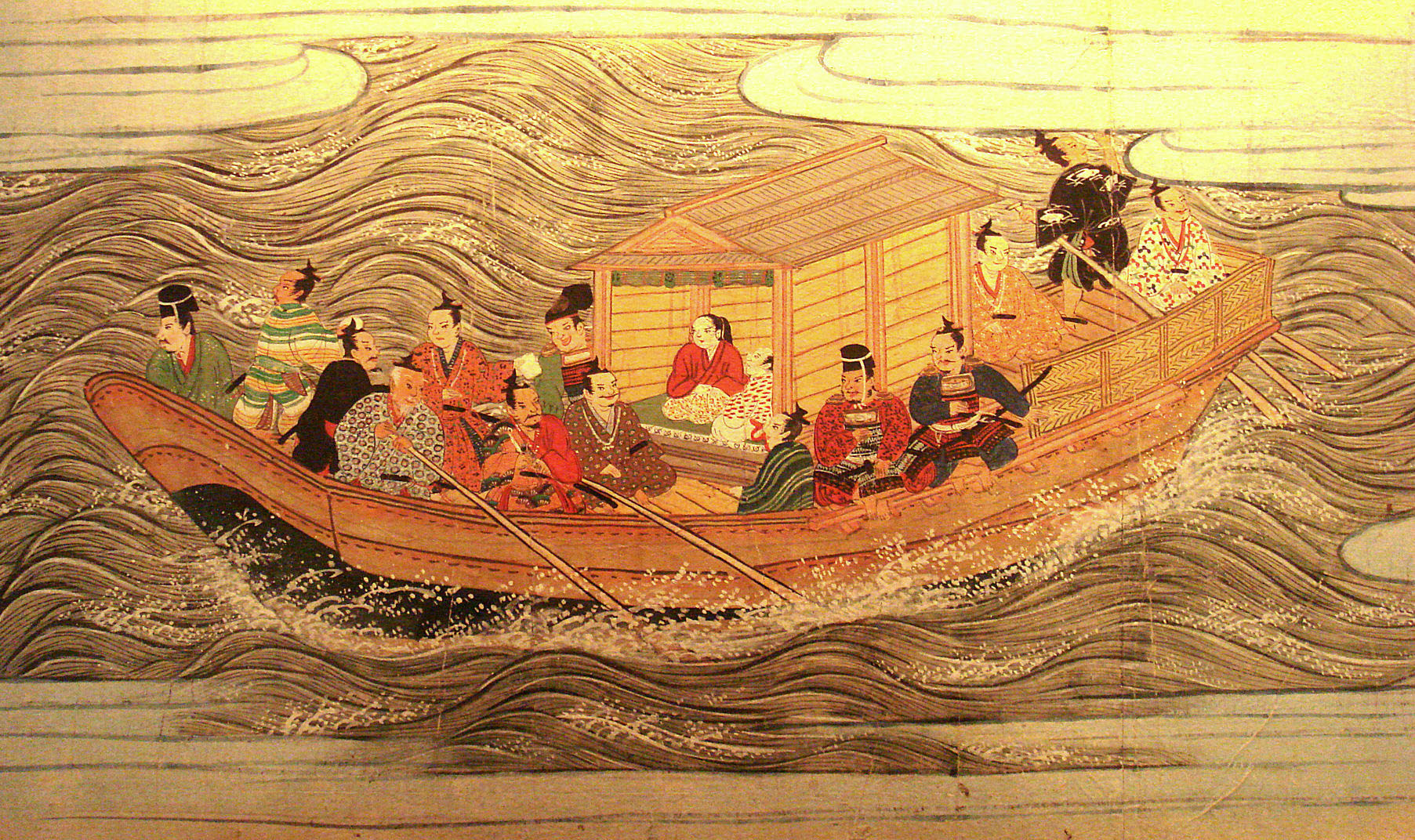
A ship of the Muromachi period (1538)

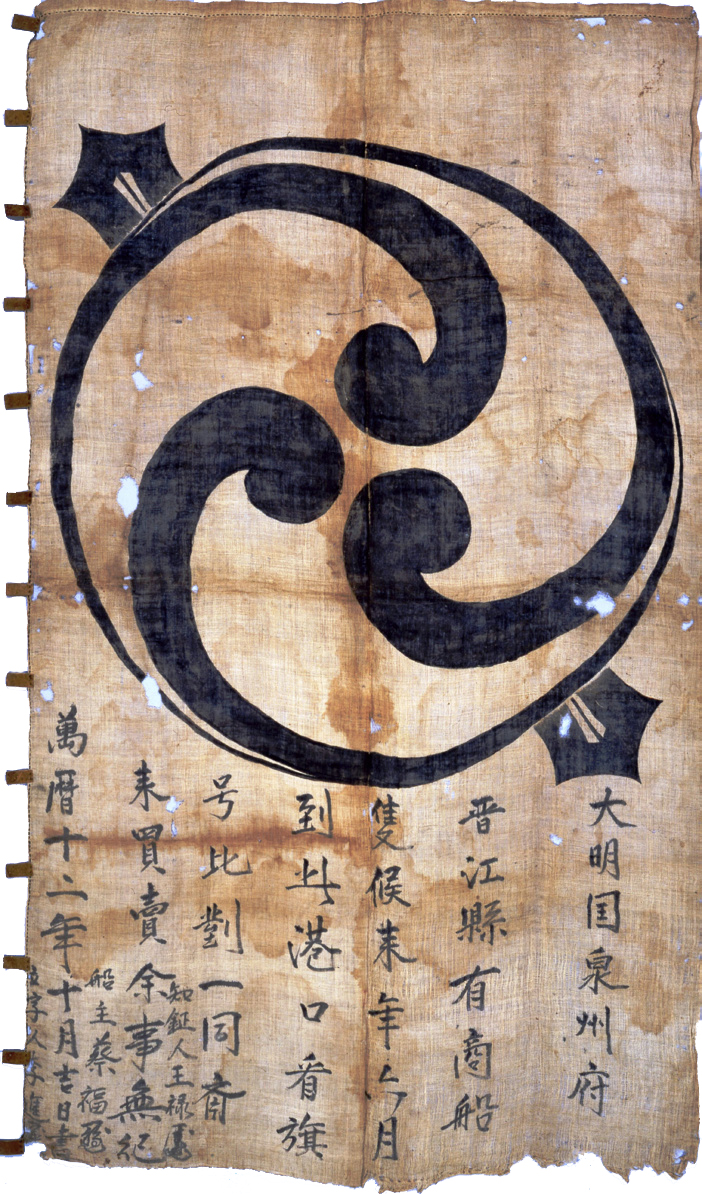
1584 Japan-Ming trade ship flag, inscribed with the signatures and kaō, or stylized signatures, of three Ming merchants; to be raised the following year upon arrival in what is now Shimonoseki (Yamaguchi Prefectural Archives)

In spite of the war Japan's relative economic prosperity, which had begun in the Kamakura period, continued well into the Muromachi period. By 1450 Japan's population stood at ten million, compared to six million at the end of the thirteenth century. Commerce flourished, including considerable trade with China and Korea. Because the daimyōs and other groups within Japan were minting their own coins, Japan began to transition from a barter-based to a currency-based economy. During the period, some of Japan's most representative art forms developed, including ink wash painting, ikebana flower arrangement, the tea ceremony, Japanese gardening, bonsai, and Noh theater. Though the eighth Ashikaga shogun, Yoshimasa, was an ineffectual political and military leader, he played a critical role in promoting these cultural developments.

The Japanese contact with the Ming dynasty (1368–1644) began when China was renewed during the Muromachi period after the Chinese sought support in suppressing Japanese pirates in coastal areas of China. Japanese pirates of this era and region were referred to as wokou by the Chinese (Japanese wakō). Wanting to improve relations with China and to rid Japan of the wokou threat, Ashikaga Yoshimitsu accepted a relationship with the Chinese that was to last for half a century. In 1401 he restarted the tribute system, describing himself in a letter to the Chinese Emperor as "Your subject, the King of Japan". Japanese wood, sulfur, copper ore, swords, and folding fans were traded for Chinese silk, porcelain, books, and coins, in what the Chinese considered tribute but the Japanese saw as profitable trade.

== Azuchi–Momoyama period (1573–1603) ==
Renaissance Europeans were quite admiring of Japan when they reached the country in the 16th century. Japan was considered a country immensely rich in precious metals, a view that owed its conception mainly to Marco Polo's accounts of gilded temples and palaces, but also due to the relative abundance of surface ores characteristic of a volcanic country, before large-scale deep-mining became possible in Industrial times. Japan was to become a major exporter of copper and silver during the period.

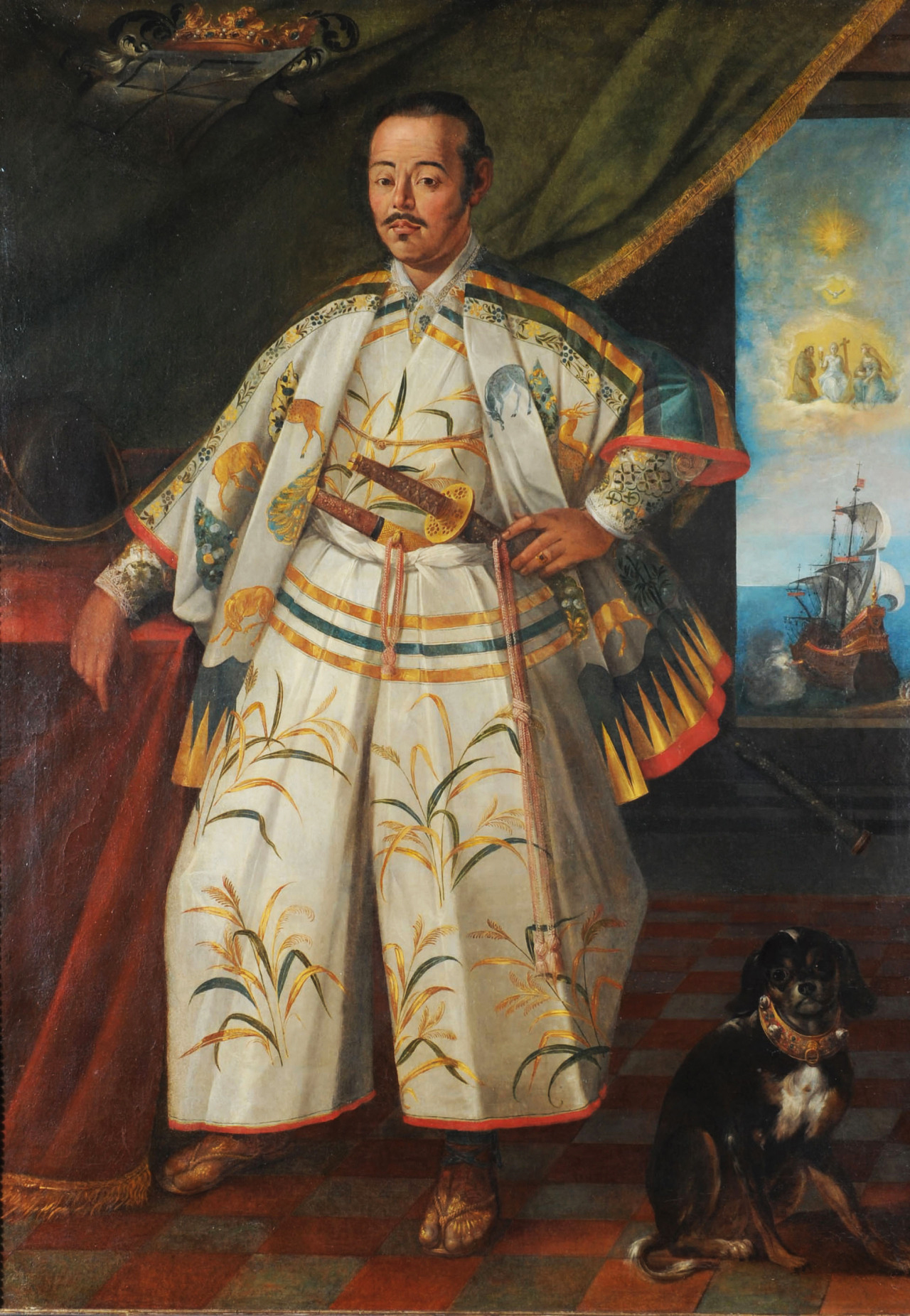
The Samurai Hasekura Tsunenaga in Rome in 1615, Coll. Borghese, Rome

Japan was also perceived as a sophisticated feudal society with a high culture and advanced pre-industrial technology. It was densely populated and urbanized. Prominent European observers of the time seemed to agree that the Japanese "excel not only all the other Oriental peoples, they surpass the Europeans as well" (Alessandro Valignano, 1584, "Historia del Principo y Progresso de la Compania de Jesus en las Indias Orientales).

Early European visitors were amazed by the quality of Japanese craftsmanship and metalsmithing. This stems from the fact that Japan itself is rather poor in natural resources found commonly in Europe, especially iron. Thus, the Japanese were famously frugal with their consumable resources; what little they had they used with expert skill.

=== Trade with Europe ===
The cargo of the first Portuguese ships (usually about four small ships every year) that arrived in Japan consisted almost entirely of Chinese goods (silk, porcelain). The Japanese were very much looking forward to acquiring such goods, but had been prohibited from any contacts with the Emperor of China, as a punishment for Wakō pirate raids. The Portuguese (who were called Nanban, lit. Southern Barbarians) therefore found the opportunity to act as intermediaries in Asian trade.

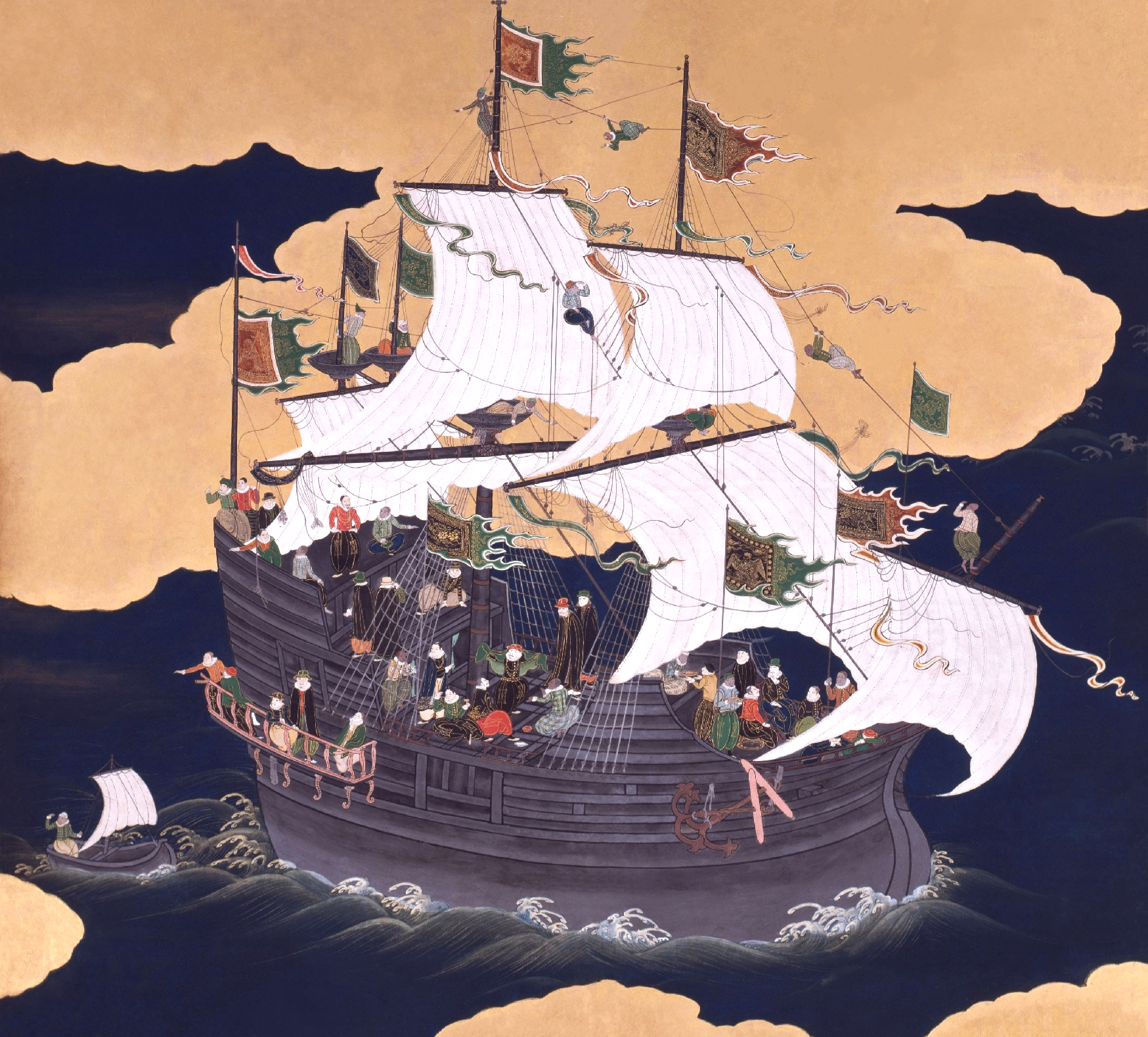
A Portuguese carrack in Nagasaki, 17th century

From the time of the acquisition of Macau in 1557, and their formal recognition as trade partners by the Chinese, the Portuguese started to regulate trade to Japan, by selling to the highest bidder the annual "Captaincy" to Japan, in effect conferring exclusive trading rights for a single carrack bound for Japan every year. The carracks were very large ships, usually between 1000 and 1500 tons, about double or triple the size of a large galleon or junk.

That trade continued with few interruptions until 1638, when it was prohibited on the ground that the ships were smuggling priests into Japan.

Portuguese trade was progressively more and more challenged by Chinese smugglers on junks, Japanese Red Seal Ships from around 1592 (about ten ships per year), Spanish ships from Manila from around 1600 (about one ship per year), the Dutch from 1609, and the English from 1613 (about one ship per year).

The Dutch, who, rather than "Nanban" were called "Kōmō" (Jp:紅毛, lit. "Red Hair") by the Japanese, first arrived in Japan in 1600, on board the Liefde. Their pilot was William Adams, the first Englishman to reach Japan. In 1605, two of the Liefde's crew were sent to Pattani by Tokugawa Ieyasu, to invite Dutch trade to Japan. The head of the Pattani Dutch trading post, Victor Sprinckel, refused on the ground that he was too busy dealing with Portuguese opposition in Southeast Asia. In 1609 however, the Dutch Jacques Specx arrived with two ships in Hirado, and through Adams obtained trading privileges from Ieyasu.

The Dutch also engaged in piracy and naval combat to weaken Portuguese and Spanish shipping in the Pacific, and ultimately became the only westerners to be allowed access to Japan from the small enclave of Dejima after 1638 and for the next two centuries.

== Edo period (1603–1868) ==
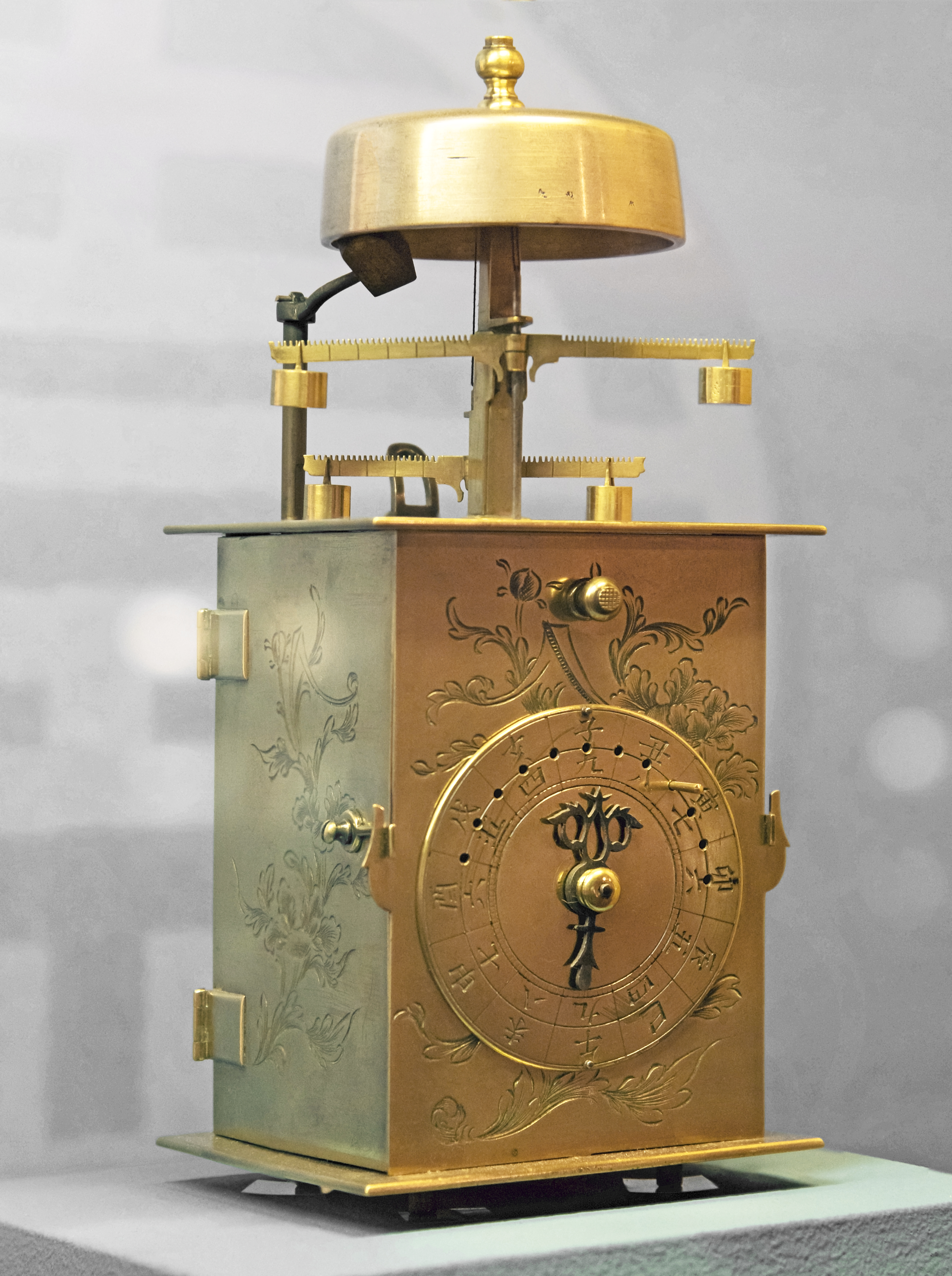
Japanese-made clockwatch of the 18th century, or Wadokei. Then time changed in the season because from sunrise to sunset made 12 hours and from sunset to sunrise made 12 hours.

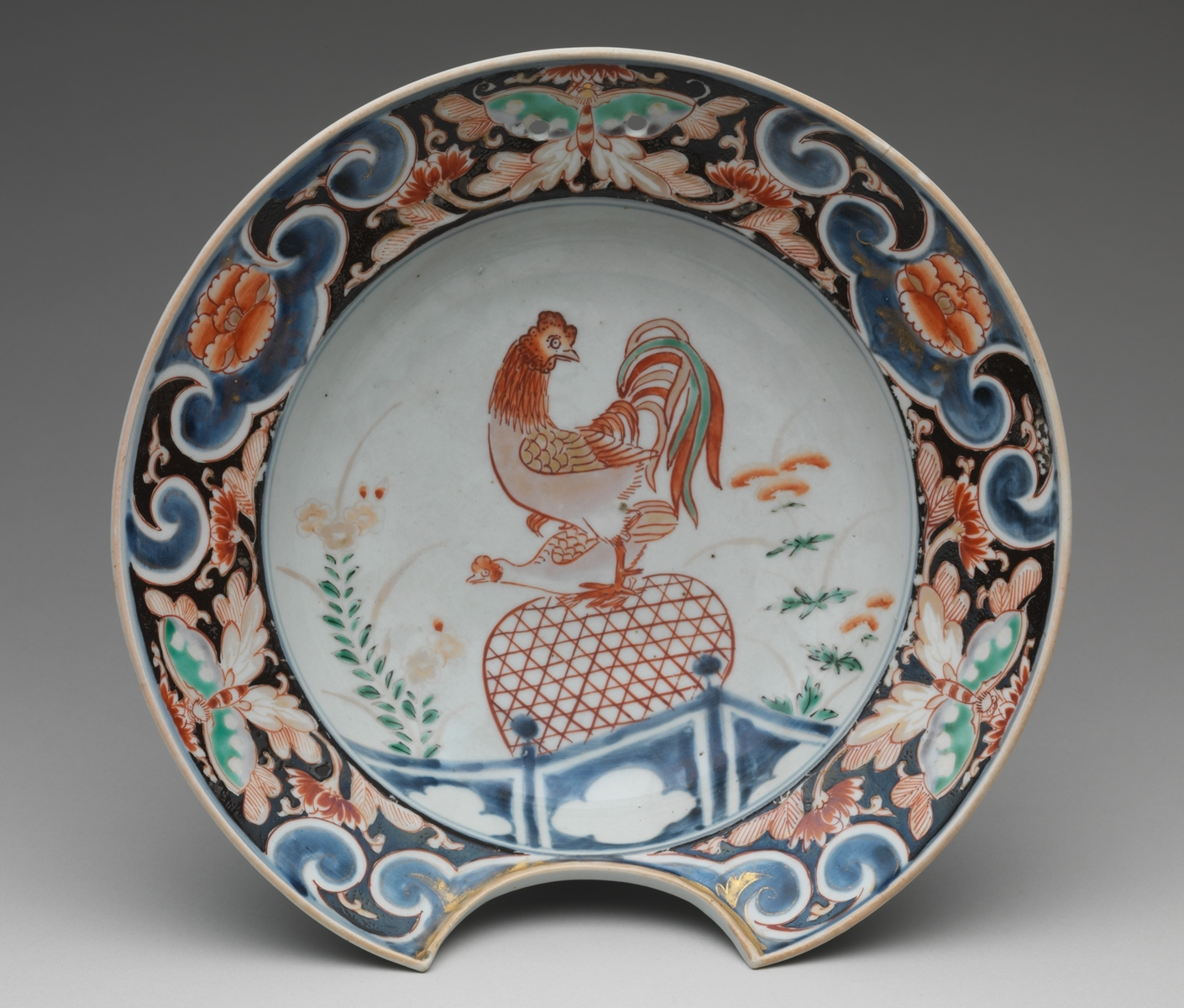
Japanese export porcelain in the European shape of a barber's shaving basin bowl, with copulating cock, around 1700

Economic development during the Edo period included urbanization, increased shipping of commodities, a significant expansion of domestic and, initially, foreign commerce, and a diffusion of trade and handicraft industries. The construction trades flourished, along with banking facilities and merchant associations. Increasingly, han authorities oversaw the rising agricultural production and the spread of rural handicrafts. By the mid-18th century, Edo had a population of more than 1 million and Osaka and Kyoto each had more than 400,000 inhabitants. Many other castle towns grew as well. Osaka and Kyoto became busy trading and handicraft production centers, while Edo was the center for the supply of food and essential urban consumer goods. Rice was the base of the economy, as the daimyō collected the taxes from the peasants in the form of rice. Taxes were high, about 40% of the harvest. The rice was sold at the fudasashi market in Edo. To raise money, the daimyō used forward contracts to sell rice that was not yet harvested. These contracts were similar to modern futures trading.

The beginning of the Edo period coincides with the last decades of the Nanban trade period, during which intense interaction with European powers, on the economic and religious plane, took place. At the beginning of the Edo period, Japan built her first ocean-going Western-style warships, such as the San Juan Bautista, a 500-ton galleon-type ship that transported a Japanese embassy headed by Hasekura Tsunenaga to the Americas, and then continued to Europe. Also during that period, the bakufu commissioned around 350 Red Seal Ships, three-masted and armed trade ships, for intra-Asian commerce. Japanese adventurers, such as Yamada Nagamasa, were active throughout Asia.

To eradicate the influence of Christianization, Japan entered in a period of isolation called sakoku, during which its economy enjoyed stability and mild progress. But not long after, in the 1650s, the production of Japanese export porcelain increased greatly when civil war put the main Chinese center of porcelain production, in Jingdezhen, out of action for several decades. For the rest of the 17th century most Japanese porcelain production was in Kyushu for export through the Chinese and Dutch. The trade dwindled under renewed Chinese competition by the 1740s, before resuming after the opening of Japan in the mid-19th century.

During the period, Japan progressively studied Western sciences and techniques (called rangaku, literally "Dutch studies") through the information and books received through the Dutch traders in Dejima. The main areas that were studied included geography, medicine, natural sciences, astronomy, art, languages, physical sciences such as the study of electrical phenomena, and mechanical sciences as exemplified by the development of Japanese clockwatches, or wadokei, inspired from Western techniques.

Among the economic impacts of the 1850s unequal treaties imposed on Japan by the United States and Europe was that Japan could not unilaterally set tariff rates on imported goods. As a result, it was hampered in developing domestic industries that could compete with imported goods.

== Meiji era (1868–1912) ==
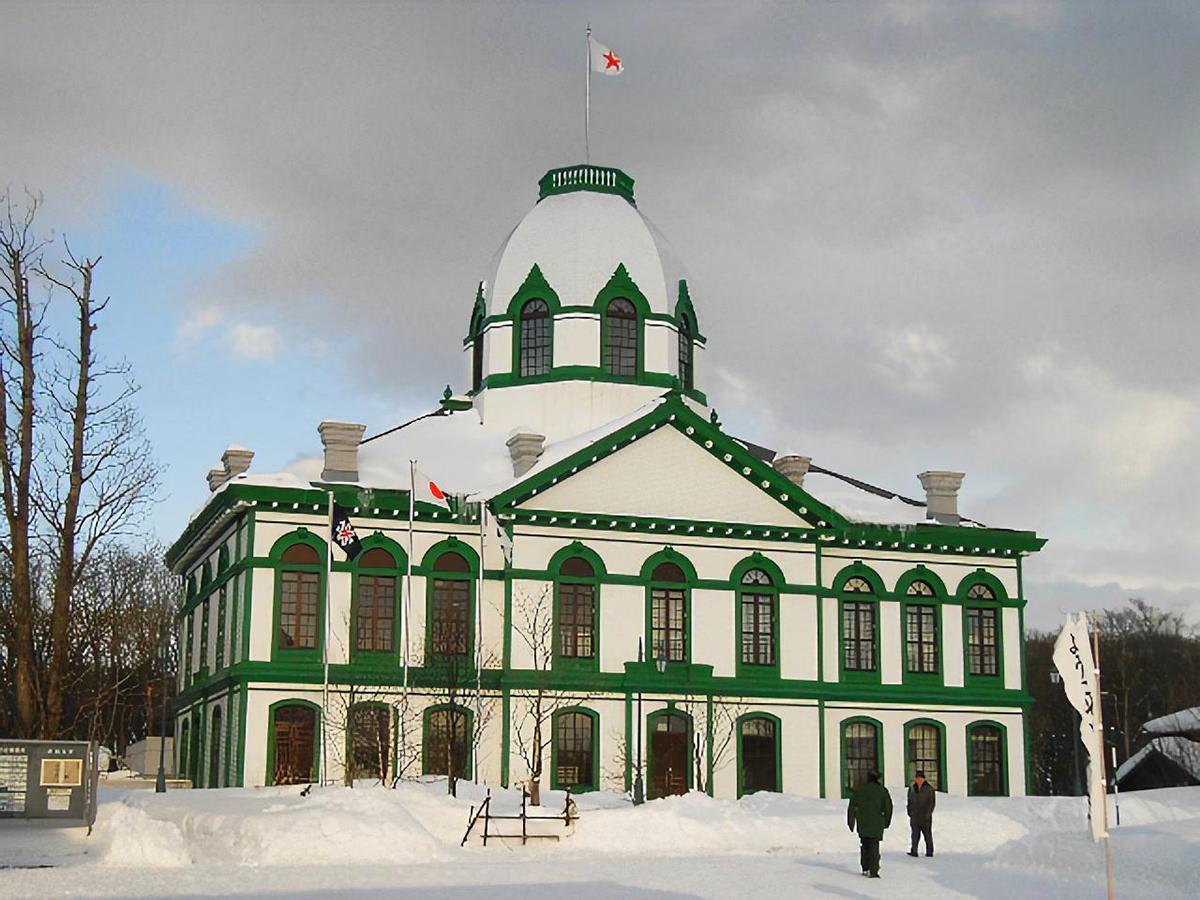
Hokkaidō Development Commission Sapporo Main Office (Historical Village of Hokkaido)

After the fall of the Tokugawa shogunate and subsequent founding of the Meiji government in 1868, Japan underwent significant Westernization.

It involved rapid industrialization, the development of a capitalist economy, and the transformation of many feudal workers to wage labour. The use of strike action also increased, and 1897, with the establishment of a union for metalworkers, the foundations of the modern Japanese trade-union movement were formed.

Japan developed modern industry through direct state intervention. From the late 1860s to the early 1890s, Japan established state-owned factories to serve as models for industrial development. These factories made significant use of foreign technology and foreign experts. Government-owned enterprises were important to the development of key economic sectors like railways.

Through government connections, major private enterprises received various forms of financial support from the state. After the late 1880s, most economic development came from private enterprise, particularly the zaibatsu.

Industrialization first appeared in the textile industries, especially cotton and silk production, which were based in home workshops in rural areas. By the 1890s, Japanese textiles dominated the home markets and competed successfully with British products in China and India, as well. Japanese shippers were also competing with European traders to carry these goods across Asia and even to Europe. As in the West, the textile mills employed mainly women, half of them under age twenty. They were sent there by their fathers, and they turned over their wages to their fathers. Japan largely skipped water power and moved straight to steam powered mills, which were more productive and created a demand for coal.

1907 saw the greatest number of labor disputes in a decade, with large-scale riots at Japan's two leading copper mines, Ashio and Besshi, which were only suppressed by the use of troops. None of these early unions were large (the metalworkers union had 3,000 members, only 5% of workers employed in the industry), or lasted longer than three or four years, largely due to strong opposition from employers and the government's anti-union policies, notably the Public Order and Police Provisions Law (1900).

Despite this, Japanese citizens were given more opportunities for social mobility. Samurai and their descendants were allowed to work in any occupation. Admissions to universities were done on the basis of examination results. Nonetheless, samurai and their descendants were still overrepresented in the new elite class. The government also recruited more than 3,000 Westerners to teach modern science, mathematics, technology, and foreign languages in Japan (O-yatoi gaikokujin).

Japan colonized Korea, officially annexing it on 22 August 1910 as the Province of Choson. Japan encouraged an inflow of Japanese capital to Korea's less developed economy. A large majority of major firms in Korea became Japanese owned and operated as a result, with key positions reserved for Japanese. Most of Korea's coal, iron, and crop production was shipped to Japan.

=== Banking ===
Before 1868 the feudal fiefs all issued their own money, called hansatsu, in an array of incompatible denominations. The government sent observers to the United States, and at first copied the decentralized American system with no central bank. The New Currency Act of Meiji 4 (1871) did away with local currencies and established the yen as the new decimal currency. It had parity with the Mexican silver dollar.

The former han (fiefs) became prefectures and their mints became private chartered banks. Initially they retained the right to print money. For a time both the central government and these so-called "national" banks issued money. That period ended when central bank—the Bank of Japan—was founded in 1882, after the Belgian model. It has since been partly privately owned (its stock is traded over the counter, hence the stock number). The national Bank was given a monopoly on controlling the money supply in 1884, and by 1904 the previously issued notes were all retired.

The Bank was formally on a bimetallic standard but due to a lack of gold, it was practically on the silver standard. It adopted the gold standard in 1897. The gold standard was suspended in 1917 and dropped in 1931. In 1973 flexible exchange rates were adopted.

=== Railways ===
After 1868 the new Meiji regime strongly encouraged railroad construction. This modernizing move had multiple objectives. It would weaken feudalistic institutions. Railroads would enable rapid military responses to invasion threats, by Russia in particular. The movement and therefore price of rice would become cheaper and foreign trade would grow. In a broader sense, modernized transportation would inspire the people and facilitate growth. The government made the final decision to build the system in 1870, using a million-pound sterling loan from Britain and British engineers. The Japanese Public Works Ministry handled the actual construction.

In 1868 Thomas Blake Glover, a Scottish merchant, was responsible for bringing the first steam locomotive, "Iron Duke", to Japan, which he demonstrated on an 8-mile track in the Ōura district of Nagasaki. However, after centuries of a culture of 'distrust of foreigners', construction of the premier railway built by non-Japanese was considered politically unacceptable to the new Japanese regime. Therefore, the government of Japan decided to build a railway from the major port of Yokohama to Tokyo using British financing and 300 British and European technical advisors: civil engineers, general managers, locomotive builders and drivers. To undertake its construction, foreign experts were contracted, with the specific intent that such experts would educate Japanese co-workers so that Japan could become self-sufficient in railway construction expertise, at which time the foreign contractors were expected to leave the country. In late 1872, the first railway, between Shimbashi (later Shiodome) and Yokohama (present Sakuragichō) opened. A one-way trip took 53 minutes in comparison to 40 minutes for a modern electric train. Service started with nine round trips daily.

British engineer Edmund Morel (1841–1871) supervised construction of the first railway on Honshu. American engineer Joseph U. Crowford (1842–1942) supervised construction of a coal mine railway on Hokkaidō in 1880, and German engineer Herrmann Rumschottel (1844–1918) supervised railway construction on Kyushu beginning in 1887. All three trained Japanese engineers to undertake railway projects. Two men trained by Crowford later became presidents of Japan National Railways.

The precise reason why a track gauge of 3 ft 6 in (1,067 mm) (also known as "Cape gauge") came to be selected remains uncertain. It could be because 3 ft 6 in (1,067 mm) was supposed to be cheaper to build than the internationally more widely used "Stephenson gauge" of 4 ft 8 1/2 in (1,435 mm), or because the first British agent, whose contract was later cancelled, ordered iron sleepers made for the narrower gauge. It seems most likely, however, that Morel's previous experience building Cape gauge railways in similar New Zealand terrain was a significant influence, and Cape gauge became the de facto standard.

==== Network expansion ====
The next line constructed was from another port, Kobe, to the major commercial city of Osaka (opening in 1874), and then to Kyoto (1877) and Otsu (1880) at the southern end of Lake Biwa. A line was constructed from Tsuruga, on the Sea of Japan, to Ogaki (connecting to a canal to Nagoya) via Nagahama on the northern end of Lake Biwa, opening in 1884 and using trans-shipment onto water-going vessels to connect the Sea of Japan to Osaka, Kyoto and Nagoya.

Linking Tokyo to Nagoya and Kyoto became the next priority. Initially the proposed route was inland, from Tokyo north to Takasaki, then west through the Usui Pass to Karuizawa and the Kiso River valley. At this time the Nippon Railway Co. (NRC) became the first to be granted a concession to operate what became the Tohoku Main Line from Ueno to Aomori, with a branch line from Omiya to Takasaki. Construction of both lines was undertaken by the Government at the company's expense, with the government having running rights on the Takasaki-Ueno section. The line to Takasaki opened in 1884, as did the Tohoku line as far as Utsunomiya.

The NRC also financed a new line linking to the Yokohama line which was built from Akabane via Shinjuku to Shinagawa (with the NRC gaining track usage rights at the government station at Shinagawa). This was the first section of what has become the Yamanote Line, and opened in 1885.

The government funded line from Takasaki reached Yokokawa at the base of the Usui Pass in 1885, and initial surveys indicated a ruling grade of 10% (later improved to 6.67%) and extensive tunneling was required to reach Karuizawa.

Construction also started on another line from the Sea of Japan, commencing at Naoetsu and opening to Karuizawa via Nagano in 1888.

As the costs of construction through the mountainous interior of Japan became apparent, in 1886 the construction of what became the Tokaido line was approved, approximately paralleling the southern coastline (and Tokaido road) as far as Nagoya. Although ~238 km longer, it was projected to cost 13% less, this saving then being allocated to construct a line from Otsu along the eastern side of Lake Biwa to Nagahama to remove the need for trans-shipment, which opened in 1889, as did the final section of the Tokaido Line via Gotemba. Until the opening of the Tokaido Shinkansen in 1964, this was the most important main line in Japan.

==== Consolidating the network ====
In 1888 the San'yō Railway Co. (SRC) was granted a charter to build the San'yō Main Line from Kobe west to Shimonoseki, a port providing a connection to the port of Moji on Kyushu, from which the Kyushu Railway Co (KRC) built its line to Hakata and Kumamoto opening between 1889 and 1891, extended to Yatsushiro in 1896. The SRC line reached Hiroshima in 1894, and Shimonoseki in 1901. Other private endeavors included the Mito Railway, which opened the first section of the Joban Line in 1889 and was acquired by the NRC in 1892 which extended to Sendai via an east coastal route in 1905 and the Bantan Railway, which built a 52 km line north from Himeji between 1894 and 1901, and was acquired by the SRC in 1903.

The success of the Nippon Railway Co and other private companies led to a Japanese situation akin to the UK Railway Mania. From the mid-1880s until 1891 new railway companies had little difficulty in attracting funding, usually through issuing shares. However, in 1891 the failure of a company proposing to build a line from Gotenba to Matsumoto ended the 'mania', and the Government realized a more planned approach to the network expansion it desired was required.

==== Evolving policy ====
In 1887 the Japanese Army proposed building its own lines to ensure routes of military significance were given priority. The Railway Department deflected that proposal by commencing development of a policy for a comprehensive national network. The Japanese Government became increasingly interested in the policy formulation following the completion of the Tokaido Main Line in 1889, the creation of the National Diet in 1890 and the financial panic of 1891. The 1892 Railway Construction Act (RCA) listed a series of priority routes on Honshu, Kyushu and Shikoku (Hokkaido was covered separately in 1896 legislation), with the specific policy that private construction of such routes would be encouraged, with the Japanese Government only funding routes not able to be privately constructed. By that year the privately owned network was ~2,124 km compared to the government owned sections totaling ~887 km. While this figure seemed to indicate the potential for further private funding of railway construction (notwithstanding the routes already targeted by private companies), subsequent events demonstrated otherwise.

A two-phase approach was adopted in the RCA, with 40 routes totaling ~3,000 km included in the "phase one" 12-year program, with phase 2 covering another ~4,000 km of proposed lines, the priorities being set on the basis of economic development and/or military strategic importance.

A specific outcome of the RCA was that every prefecture would be served by railway communication. The major routes proposed under the act for government construction included;

- The Chuo line, an inland connection from Tokyo to Nagoya favored by the military (detailed below);
- The Ou line, also detailed below;
- Extension of the line from Tsuruga to Kanazawa and Toyama (Hokuriku Main Line) opened 1896–1899;
- A connection from the Chuo line at Shiojiri to Matsuyama and Nagano (Shinonoi Line) opened 1900–1902; and
- The original inland line from Kagoshima to Yatsushiro (now the Nippo Main Line and Hisatsu Line) opened 1901–1909

The Chuo line, the route of which approximated the initial proposed inland line between Tokyo and Nagoya, was favored by the military as its inland alignment protected it from perceived risk of bombardment by enemy vessels. A privately built line from Shinjuku to the silk industry centre of Hachioji had opened 1889, and this became the starting point for government construction.

The newly determined route was via Kofu (through the 4,657 m Sasago tunnel, which was the longest in Japan until the Shimizu Tunnel opened in 1931), Shiojiri and then via the Kiso River valley to Nagoya. Construction was undertaken from both ends, with sections opening sequentially from 1900 until the lines were connected in 1911.

The Ou line from Fukushima to Yamagata, Akita and Aomori, serving the poorer northern Sea of Japan coastal prefectures, was seen as a priority for national development that was commercially unattractive. The government commenced construction from Aomori towards Hirosaki in 1894, and at the southern end from Fukushima in 1899, the lines connecting in 1905. Most of the major routes proposed under the act for private construction were not so funded and were ultimately constructed by the government.

The Japanese National Railways was formed by the nationalization of 17 private railways in 1907. It actively promoted uniformity and scientific management.

== Taishō era (1912–1926) ==
An economic boom produced during the World War I era subsided and ended by 1921. The Japanese economy had high unemployment, shortages of raw materials, and overpopulation. The price of rice increased dramatically, resulting in the 1918 Rice Riots. Significant labor unrest in the industrial sector also resulted.

From 1918 to 1921, a wave of major industrial disputes marked the peak of organized labour power. The prolonged economic slump brought cutbacks in employment in heavy industry.

In 1927, 25% of Japanese banks failed during a crisis in the country's banking sector.

By 1928, the GNP of Japan at current prices peaked at ¥16,506 million. In the mid-1930s, the Japanese nominal wage rates were a tenth of those in the United States (based on mid-1930s exchange rates), while the price level is estimated to have been about 44% that of the US.

Comparison of GDP per capita (US Dollars) between East-Asian Nations and the US in 1936:

Country	GDP/capita, in 1935 dollars (Liu-Ta-Chung)	GDP-PPP/capita, in 1990 dollars (Fukao)	GDP-PPP/capita, in 1990 dollars (Maddison)
U.S.	540	5,590	5,590
Japan (Mainland Japan)	64	1,760	2,154
Taiwan	42	1,262	1,212
Korea	24	690	1,224
China	18	619	562

== Shōwa era (1926–1989) ==
In the 1930s, the Japanese economy suffered less from the Great Depression than most industrialized nations, its GDP expanding at a rapid rate of 5% per year. Manufacturing and mining came to account for more than 30% of GDP, more than twice the value for the agricultural sector. Most industrial growth, however, was geared toward expanding the nation's military power.

Among the influences on Japanese policymakers' view of industrialization was the speed of the Soviet Union's catch-up industrialization. Economic planning in the Japanese puppet state of Manchukuo was influenced by Japanese observations of the Soviet approach and reflected in Manchukuo's Five Year Plan for Heavy Industry. The development of industry in Manchukuo further influenced Japanese economic mobilization following the start of the Second Sino-Japanese War.

Beginning in 1937 with significant land seizures in China, and to a greater extent after 1941, when annexations and invasions across Southeast Asia and the Pacific created the Greater East Asia Co-Prosperity Sphere, the Japanese government sought to acquire and develop critical natural resources to secure economic independence. Among the natural resources that Japan seized and developed were: coal in China, sugarcane in the Philippines, petroleum from the Dutch East Indies and Burma, and tin and bauxite from the Dutch East Indies and Malaya. Japan also purchased the rice production of Thailand, Burma, and Cochinchina. According to a 2020 study, Japan used its imperial power to boost its industrialization. Although Japan intended to extract resources from the Greater East Asia Co-Prosperity Sphere to support its war effort, strong resistance from the countries it occupied and the overall war pressures meant that Japan ultimately obtained little economic benefit.

During the early stages of Japan's expansion, the Japanese economy expanded considerably. Steel production rose from 6,442,000 tons to 8,838,000 tons over the same time period. In 1941 Japanese aircraft industries had the capacity to manufacture 10,000 aircraft per year. Much of this economic expansion benefited the zaibatsu, large industrial conglomerates. The Tojo cabinet (1941 to 1944) established control associations to control industrial production deemed critical to Japan's military capacity, including iron and steel production, coal, cement, machinery, motor vehicles, ship building, and foreign trade. Individual companies continued to be privately owned, but were responsible for meeting production targets set by government ministries. Control associations were headed by chairmen from the zaibatsu.

Japan's manufacturing sector experienced labor shortages in the early 1940s as a result of its military conscription. Japan forced prisoners of war and foreign labors to work in factories, including more than one million Koreans whom it took to Japan for this purpose from 1941 to 1945. Beginning in 1944, the Japanese government drafted middle school boys to work in factories.

Over the course of the Pacific War, the economies of Japan and its occupied territories all suffered severely. Inflation was rampant; Japanese heavy industry, forced to devote nearly all its production to meet military needs, was unable to meet the commercial requirements of Japan (which had previously relied on trade with Western countries for their manufactured goods). Local industries were unable to produce at high enough levels to avoid severe shortfalls. Furthermore, maritime trade, upon which the Empire depended greatly, was sharply curtailed by damage to the Japanese merchant fleet over the course of the war.

By the end of the war, what remained of the Japanese Empire was wracked by shortages, inflation, and currency devaluation. Transport was nearly impossible, and industrial production in Japan's shattered cities ground to a halt. The destruction wrought by the war eventually brought the Japanese economy to a virtual standstill.

=== Post-World War II ===
The war wiped out many of the gains which Japan had made since 1868. About 40% of the nation's industrial plants and infrastructure were destroyed, and production reverted to levels of about fifteen years earlier. The people were shocked by the devastation and swung into action. New factories were equipped with the best modern machines, giving Japan an initial competitive advantage over the victor states, who now had older factories. As Japan's second period of economic development began, millions of former soldiers joined a well-disciplined and highly educated work force to rebuild Japan. Japan's colonies were lost as a result of World War II, but since then the Japanese extended their economic influence throughout Asia and beyond.

==== Occupation and reform ====
After the Japanese surrender on 15 August 1945, allied forces, mostly American, rapidly began arriving in Japan. Almost immediately, the occupiers began an intensive program of legal changes designed to democratize Japan. In the wake of World War II, the Japanese citizenry was suffering from widespread exhaustion and despair from the war, known as kyodatsu, causing large-scale dejection and despondency. The term "gifts from Heaven" was coined by cartoonist Kato Etsuro in his first illustrations under US military occupation. These gifts referred to the bloodless democratic revolution from above ushered in by US forces that put an end to a socially debilitating war. Of the many aspects of the revolution from above, the reforms extending the right to vote to women, strengthening labor unionization, and liberalizing the economy were some of the most enduring changes that stand to this day.

One of the most significant economic reforms was the division and distribution of rural land to Japanese tenant farmers. Previously, property belonged to landlords and farmers worked on it in a feudal type system. Modern capitalist theory held that this feudal practice did not incentivize growth and the rural landlord class was dissolved. In addition to the dissolution of the landlord class, the massive business conglomerates known as zaibatsu that had effectively controlled the Japanese economy for almost 100 years were also broken up and faced market competition. The Law for the Elimination of Excessive Economic Concentration (passed in December 1947) provided for the dissolution of any company considered to be monopolistic, while the "law on the expulsion of Zaibatsu-affiliated controls" of January 1948 enforced the resignation of Zaibatsu board members who were related closely to Zaibatsu families, while a measure was taken to ban on holding the concurrent board posts of their affiliated companies. In addition, a government employees law was enacted, the first group of Japanese Supreme Court justices was appointed, local government and the police were reorganised, the Ministries of Home Affairs, Navy, and War were abolished, extensive revisions were made to criminal law, and progress was made on land reform.

Finally, the unionization of Japanese workers was encouraged by US occupying forces that forced companies to compete on technology and innovation. Trade unions had emerged in Japan in the second half of the Meiji period as the country underwent a period of rapid industrialization. Until 1945, however, the labor movement had remained weak, impeded by lack of legal rights, anti-union legislation, management-organised factory councils, and political divisions between "cooperative" and radical unionists. At the encouragement of occupation authorities, a Trade Union Law allowing workers to organize, strike, and bargain collectively for the first time was passed by the Diet on 22 December 1945. While the law was created while Japan was under occupation, the law itself was largely a Japanese work. It was put together by a large legal advisory commission headed by the legal scholar Suehiro Izutaro. The commission was quite large, consisting of "three Welfare ministry bureaucrats and two scholars, a steering committee of 30 members (including the communist firebrand Kyuichi Tokuda), and an overall membership of more than 130 members representing universities, corporations, political parties, the bureaucracy, social workers, and labor."

US assistance totaled about US$1.9 billion during the occupation, or about 15% of the nation's imports and 4% of GNP in that period. About 59% of this aid was in the form of food, 15% in industrial materials, and 12% in transportation equipment. US grant assistance, however, tapered off quickly with the end of the occupation in the 1952 and the cessation of the Korean War in 1953. US military procurement from Japan peaked at a level equivalent to 7% of Japan's GNP in 1953 and fell below 1% after 1960. A variety of United States-sponsored measures during the occupation, such as land reform, contributed to the economy's later performance by increasing competition. In particular, the post-war purge of industrial leaders allowed new talent to rise in the management of the nation's rebuilt industries.

==== "Reverse Course" and retrenchment ====
The Reverse Course (逆コース, gyaku kōsu) is the name commonly given to a major shift in the Occupation policies that began in 1947 in response to the emerging global Cold War. In particular, U.S. priorities shifted from democratizing and reforming Japan to ensuring internal political stability, rebuilding the shattered economy, and remilitarizing Japan to the extent possible under Article 9, in support of U.S. Cold War objectives in East Asia. This involved relaxing and in some cases even partially undoing earlier reforms the Occupation had enacted in 1945 and 1946.

Thanks to the occupation's initial, pro-union policies, union membership had rapidly risen to 5 million by February 1947. However, in a Cold War context, Japan's increasingly militant labor unions were increasingly seen as a threat to economic stability, and occupation authorities refused to allow a massive, nationwide general strike that labor unions had scheduled for 1 February. Thereafter, the occupation took measures to reduce the power of unions, most notably by issuing an edict stripping public-sector workers of their right to go on strike. The labor organization rate peaked at 55.8% in 1949 and subsequently declined to 18.2% by 2006.

Following the cancellation of the 1947 general strike, a broader shift in Occupation policies became more and more apparent. Thousands of conservative and nationalist wartime leaders were de-purged and allowed to reenter politics and government ministries. In the industrial sector, plans for further anti-trust actions against the remains of the old zaibatsu industrial conglomerates were scrapped, and some earlier anti-trust policies were partially undone. The incomplete suppression of the zaibatsu allowed them to partially reform as "informal associations" known as keiretsu.

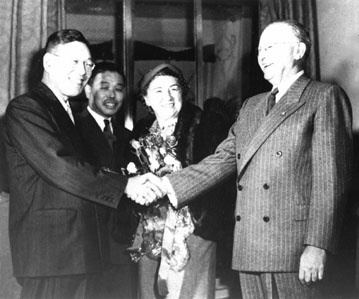
Joseph Dodge meets Finance Minister Hayato Ikeda in 1949.

To stabilize the Japanese economy as soon as possible, American banker Joseph Dodge was brought in as an economic consultant. Dodge implemented the "Dodge Line" in 1949, a set of draconian contractionary fiscal and monetary policies that caused much hardship for the Japanese populace but succeeded in getting rampant inflation under control. Dodge also fixed the exchange rate at 360 yen to the dollar, a favorable rate that would help boost Japanese exports in the years to come and power the Japanese economic miracle.

==== Economic Miracle ====
The early post-war years were devoted to rebuilding lost industrial capacity: major investments were made in electric power, coal, steel, and chemicals. By the mid-1950s, production matched prewar levels. Released from the demands of military-dominated government, the economy not only recovered its lost momentum but also surpassed the growth rates of earlier periods. Between 1953 and 1965, GDP expanded by more than 9% per year, manufacturing and mining by 13%, construction by 11%, and infrastructure by 12%. In 1965 these sectors employed more than 41% of the labor force, whereas only 26% remained in agriculture.

Major reasons for the country's economic growth from 1956 to 1979 included its domestic work force, international trade opportunities, and U.S. financial and technological aid.

Through the Yoshida Doctrine, the state involved itself more in economic planning, financial support, and trade promotion than did any other non-socialist state. The state also protected domestic industry from foreign competition, welcoming only foreign investment that brought in new technology.

Japan's highly acclaimed post-war education system contributed strongly to the modernizing process. The world's highest literacy rate and high education standards were major reasons for Japan's success in achieving a technologically advanced economy. Japanese schools also encouraged discipline, another benefit in forming an effective work force.

The mid-1960s ushered in a new type of industrial development as the economy opened itself to international competition in some industries and developed heavy and chemical manufactures. Whereas textiles and light manufactures maintained their profitability internationally, other products, such as automobiles, electronics, ships, and machine tools assumed new importance. The value added to manufacturing and mining grew at the rate of 17% per year between 1965 and 1970. Growth rates moderated to about 8% and evened out between the industrial and service sectors between 1970 and 1973, as retail trade, finance, real estate, information technology, and other service industries streamlined their operations.

Japanese consumerism continued to grow throughout the 1960s, giving rise to a well-known saying that the "three treasures" which all Japanese families needed to have were a refrigerator, a washing machine, and a television set. By 1962, it was estimated that 79.4% of all urban homes and 48.9% of rural homes in Japan had access to television.

Throughout this period, Japan's economy continued to benefit from the US-Japan Alliance in a variety of ways. Along with financial and technological aid, the US opened its domestic markets to imports from Japan. A 2018 study, using the synthetic control method whereby Japan is compared to "synthetic Japan" (a combination of countries which are similar to Japan but without the US alliance), found that the US alliance allowed Japan's GDP to "grow much faster" from 1958 to 1968.

==== Oil crisis ====
Japan faced a severe economic challenge in the mid-1970s. The 1973 oil crisis shocked an economy that had become dependent on imported petroleum. Japan experienced its first post-war decline in industrial production, together with severe price inflation. The recovery that followed the first oil crisis revived the optimism of most business leaders, but the maintenance of industrial growth in the face of high energy costs required shifts in the industrial structure.

Changing price conditions favored conservation and alternative sources of industrial energy. Although the investment costs were high, many energy-intensive industries successfully reduced their dependence on oil during the late 1970s and 1980s and enhanced their productivity. Advances in microcircuitry and semiconductors in the late 1970s and 1980s led to new growth industries in consumer electronics and computers, and to higher productivity in pre-established industries. In 1978, Japan's Ministry of International Trade and Industry provided subsidies, which was illegal under international law, to help Japanese semiconductor companies sell their chips at artificially low prices in the United States while keeping prices high in Japan, a trade practice known as dumping The net result of these adjustments was to increase the energy efficiency of manufacturing and to expand knowledge-intensive industries. The service industries expanded in an increasingly postindustrial economy.

Structural economic changes, however, were unable to check the slowing of economic growth as the economy matured in the late 1970s and 1980s, attaining annual growth rates at only 4–6%. But these rates were remarkable in a world of expensive petroleum and in a nation of few natural resources. Japan's average growth rate of 5% in the late 1980s, for example, was far higher than the 3.8% growth rate of the United States. Despite more petroleum price increases in 1979, the strength of the Japanese economy was apparent. It expanded without the double-digit inflation that afflicted other industrial nations (and that had bothered Japan itself after the first oil crisis in 1973). Japan experienced slower growth in the mid-1980s, but its demand-sustained economic boom of the late 1980s revived many troubled industries.

==== Factors of growth ====
Complex economic and institutional factors affected Japan's post-war growth. First, the nation's prewar experience provided several important legacies. The Tokugawa period (1600–1867) bequeathed a vital commercial sector in burgeoning urban centers, a relatively well-educated elite (although one with limited knowledge of European science), a sophisticated government bureaucracy, productive agriculture, a closely unified nation with highly developed financial and marketing systems, and a national infrastructure of roads. The buildup of industry during the Meiji period to the point where Japan could vie for world power was an important prelude to post-war growth from 1955 to 1973, and provided a pool of experienced labor.

Second, and more important, was the level and quality of investment that persisted through the 1980s. Investment in capital equipment, which averaged more than 11% of GNP during the prewar period, rose to about 20% of GNP during the 1950s and to more than 30% in the late 1960s and 1970s. During the economic boom of the late 1980s, the rate still hovered around 20%. Japanese businesses imported the latest technologies to develop the industrial base. As a latecomer to modernization, Japan was able to avoid some of the trial and error earlier needed by other nations to develop industrial processes. In the 1970s and 1980s, Japan improved its industrial base through licensing from the US, patent purchases, and imitation and improvement of foreign inventions. In the 1980s, industry stepped up its research and development, and many firms became famous for their innovations and creativity.

Japan's labor force contributed significantly to economic growth, because of its availability and literacy, and also because of its reasonable wage demands. Before and immediately after World War II, the transfer of numerous agricultural workers to modern industry resulted in rising productivity and only moderate wage increases. As population growth slowed and the nation became increasingly industrialized in the mid-1960s, wages rose significantly. However, labor union cooperation generally kept salary increases within the range of gains in productivity.

High productivity growth played a key role in post-war economic growth. The highly skilled and educated labor force, extraordinary savings rates and accompanying levels of investment, and the low growth of Japan's labor force were major factors in the high rate of productivity growth.

The nation also benefited from economies of scale. Although medium-sized and small enterprises generated much of the nation's employment, large facilities were the most productive. Many industrial enterprises consolidated to form larger, more efficient units. Before World War II, large holding companies formed wealth groups, or zaibatsu, which dominated most industry. The zaibatsu were dissolved after the war, but keiretsu—large, modern industrial enterprise groupings—emerged. The coordination of activities within these groupings and the integration of smaller subcontractors into the groups enhanced industrial efficiency.

Japanese corporations developed strategies that contributed to their immense growth. Growth-oriented corporations that took chances competed successfully. Product diversification became an essential ingredient of the growth patterns of many keiretsu. Japanese companies added plant and human capacity ahead of demand.

Finally, circumstances beyond Japan's direct control contributed to its success. International conflicts tended to stimulate the Japanese economy until the devastation at the end of World War II. The Russo-Japanese War (1904–05), World War I (1914–1918), the Korean War (1950–1953), and the Second Indochina War (1954–1975) brought economic booms to Japan. In addition, benign treatment from the United States after World War II facilitated the nation's reconstruction and growth.

==== The changing occupational structure ====
As late as 1955, some 40% of the labor force still worked in agriculture, but this figure had declined to 17% by 1970 and to 7.2% by 1990 and under 5% in the 21st century as Japan imported more and more of its food and small family farms disappeared.

Japan's economic growth in the 1960s and 1970s was based on the rapid expansion of heavy manufacturing in such areas as automobiles, steel, shipbuilding, chemicals, and electronics. The secondary sector (manufacturing, construction, and mining) expanded to 35.6% of the work force by 1970. By the late 1970s, however, the Japanese economy began to move away from heavy manufacturing toward a more service-oriented (tertiary sector) base. During the 1980s, jobs in wholesaling, retailing, finance, insurance, real estate, transportation, communications, and government grew rapidly, while secondary-sector employment remained stable. The tertiary sector grew from 47% of the work force in 1970 to 59.2% in 1990.

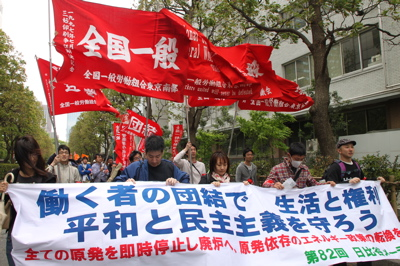
2011 National Trade Union Council (Zenrokyo) May Day march, Tokyo

Partially as a result of these transformations, The labor movement went through a process of reorganization from 1987 to 1991 from which emerged the present configuration of three major trade union federations, RENGO, Zenroren, and Zenrokyo, along with other smaller national union organizations.

=== 1980s ===
Throughout the 1970s, Japan had the world's third largest gross national product (GNP)—just behind the United States and Soviet Union—and ranked first among major industrial nations in 1990 in per capita GNP at US$23,801, up sharply from US$9,068 in 1980. After a mild economic slump in the mid-1980s, Japan's economy began a period of expansion in 1986 that continued until it again entered a recessionary period in 1992. Economic growth averaging 5% between 1987 and 1989 revived industries, such as steel and construction, which had been relatively dormant in the mid-1980s, and brought record salaries and employment. In 1992, however, Japan's real GNP growth slowed to 1.7%. Even industries such as automobiles and electronics that had experienced phenomenal growth in the 1980s entered a recessionary period in 1992. The domestic market for Japanese automobiles shrank at the same time that Japan's share of the United States' market declined. Foreign and domestic demand for Japanese electronics also declined, and Japan seemed on the way to losing its leadership in the world semiconductor market to the United States, Korea and Taiwan.

Unlike the economic booms of the 1960s and 1970s, when increasing exports played the key role in economic expansion, domestic demand propelled the Japanese economy in the late 1980s. This development involved fundamental economic restructuring, moving from dependence on exports to reliance on domestic demand. The boom that started in 1986 was generated by the decisions of companies to increase private plant and equipment spending and of consumers to go on a buying spree. Japan's imports grew at a faster rate than exports. Japanese post-war technological research was carried out for the sake of economic growth rather than military development. The growth in high-technology industries in the 1980s resulted from heightened domestic demand for high-technology products such as electronics, and for higher living, housing, and environmental standards; better medical care and more welfare; expanded leisure-time facilities; and improved ways to accommodate a rapidly aging society.

During the 1980s, the Japanese economy shifted its emphasis from primary and secondary activities (notably agriculture, manufacturing, and mining) to processing, with telecommunications and computers becoming increasingly vital. Information became an important resource and product, central to wealth and power. The rise of an information-based economy was led by major research in highly sophisticated technology, such as advanced computers. The selling and use of information became very beneficial to the economy. Tokyo became a major financial center, home to some of the world's major banks, financial firms, insurance companies, and the world's largest stock exchange, the Tokyo Securities and Stock Exchange. Even here, however, the recession took its toll.

In 1985, Japan signed the Plaza Accords in which Japan agreed to depreciate the dollar against the yen. Japan's economy entered a bubble phase as Japanese capital (which following the Plaza Accords was relatively more valuable than foreign currencies) exited Japan to purchase foreign assets. Japanese banks had significant cash which they loaned out at low interest rates. This also forced up the prices of Japanese real estate.

In 1992, the Nikkei 225 stock average began the year at 23,000 points, but fell to 14,000 points in mid-August before leveling off at 17,000 by the end of the year.

== Heisei era (1989–2019) ==
=== 1989 economic bubble ===
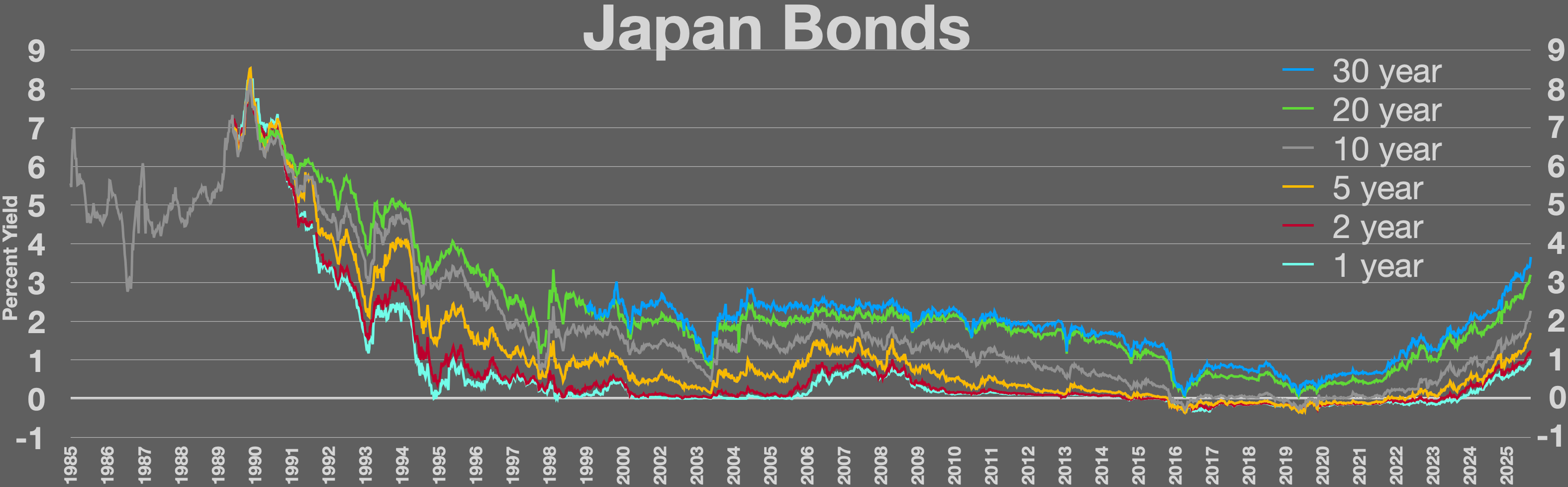
Japan bonds Inverted yield curve in 1990 Zero interest-rate policy started in 1999 Negative interest policy started in 2016 30-year 20-year 10-year 5-year 2-year 1 year

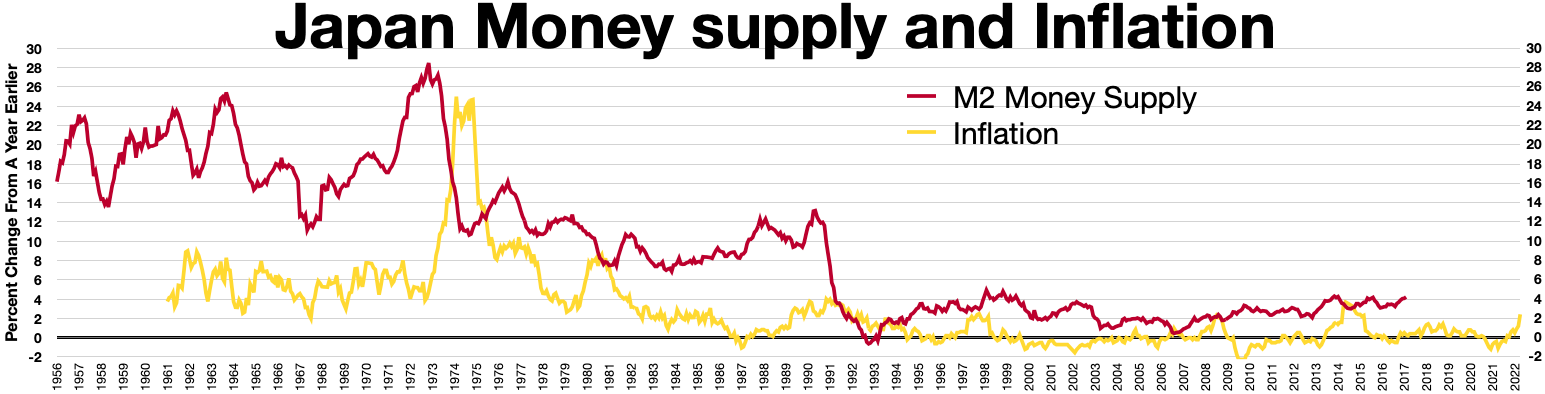
Japan money supply and inflation (year over year) M2 money supply Inflation

In the decades following World War II, Japan implemented stringent tariffs and policies to encourage the people to save their income. With more money in banks, loans and credit became easier to obtain, and with Japan running large trade surpluses, the yen appreciated against foreign currencies. This allowed local companies to invest in capital resources more easily than their overseas competitors, which reduced the price of Japanese-made goods and widened the trade surplus further. And, with the yen appreciating, financial assets became lucrative.

With so much money readily available for investment, speculation was inevitable, particularly in the Tokyo Stock Exchange and the real estate market. The Nikkei stock index hit its all-time high on 29 December 1989 when it reached an intra-day high of 38,957.44 before closing at 38,915.87. The rates for housing, stocks, and bonds rose so much that at one point the government issued 100-year bonds. Additionally, banks granted increasingly risky loans.

At the height of the bubble, real estate was extremely over-valued. Prices were highest in Tokyo's Ginza district in 1989, with choice properties fetching over US$1.5 million per square meter ($139,000 per square foot). Prices were only slightly less in other areas of Tokyo. By 2004, prime "A" property in Tokyo's financial districts had slumped and Tokyo's residential homes were a fraction of their peak, but still managed to be listed as the most expensive real estate in the world. Trillions were wiped out with the combined collapse of the Tokyo stock and real estate markets.

With Japan's economy driven by its high rates of reinvestment, this crash hit particularly hard. Investments were increasingly directed out of the country, and Japanese manufacturing firms lost some degree of their technological edge. As Japanese products became less competitive overseas, some people argue that the low consumption rate began to bear on the economy, causing a deflationary spiral.

The easily obtainable credit that had helped create and engorge the real-estate bubble continued to be a problem for several years to come, and as late as 1997, banks were still making loans that had a low guarantee of being repaid. Loan officers and investment staff had a hard time finding anything to invest in that would return a profit. Meanwhile, the extremely low interest rate offered for deposits, such as 0.1%, meant that ordinary Japanese savers were just as inclined to put their money under their beds as they were to put it in savings accounts. Correcting the credit problem became even more difficult as the government began to subsidize failing banks and businesses, creating many so-called "zombie businesses". Eventually a carry trade developed in which money was borrowed from Japan, invested for returns elsewhere and then the Japanese were paid back, with a nice profit for the trader.

The time after the bubble's collapse (崩壊, hōkai), which occurred gradually rather than catastrophically, is known as the "lost decade" (失われた10年, ushinawareta jūnen) in Japan. The Nikkei 225 stock index eventually bottomed out at 7603.76 in April 2003, moved upward to a new peak of 18,138 in June 2007, before resuming a downward trend. The downward movement in the Nikkei is likely due to global as well as national economic problems.

=== Deflation from the 1990s ===
Deflation in Japan started in the early 1990s. On 19 March 2001, the Bank of Japan and the Japanese government tried to eliminate deflation in the economy by reducing interest rates (part of their 'quantitative easing' policy). Despite having interest rates near zero for a long period, this strategy did not succeed. Once the near-zero interest rates failed to stop deflation, some economists, such as Paul Krugman, and some Japanese politicians spoke of deliberately causing (or at least creating the fear of) inflation. Systemic reasons for deflation in Japan can be said to include:

- Fallen asset prices. There was a large price bubble in both company shares and real estate in Japan in the 1980s (peaking in late 1989).
- Insolvent companies: Banks lent to companies and individuals that invested in real estate. When real estate values dropped, many loans went unpaid. The banks could try to collect on the collateral (land), but due to reduced real estate values, this would not pay off the loan. Banks have delayed the decision to collect on the collateral, hoping asset prices would improve. These delays were allowed by national banking regulators. Some banks make even more loans to these companies that are used to service the debt they already have. This continuing process is known as maintaining an "unrealized loss", and until the assets are completely revalued and/or sold off (and the loss realized), it will continue to be a deflationary force in the economy.
- Insolvent banks: Banks with a large percentage of their loans which are "non-performing" (loans for which payments are not being made), but have not yet written them off. These banks cannot lend more money until they increase their cash reserves to cover the bad loans. Thus the number of loans is reduced sooner and less funds are available for economic growth.
- Fear of insolvent banks: Japanese people are afraid that banks will collapse so they prefer to buy gold or (United States or Japanese) Treasury bonds instead of saving their money in a bank account. People also save by investing in real estate.

By 1998, Japan's public works projects still could not stimulate demand enough to end the economy's stagnation. In desperation, the Japanese government undertook "structural reform" policies intended to wring speculative excesses from the stock and real estate markets. Unfortunately, these policies led Japan into deflation on numerous occasions between 1999 and 2004. The Bank of Japan used quantitative easing to expand the country's money supply to raise expectations of inflation and spur economic growth. Initially, the policy failed to induce any growth, but it eventually began to affect inflationary expectations. By late 2005, the economy finally began what seems to be a sustained recovery. GDP growth for that year was 2.8%, with an annualized fourth quarter expansion of 5.5%, surpassing the growth rates of the US and European Union during the same period. Unlike previous recovery trends, domestic consumption has been the dominant factor of growth.

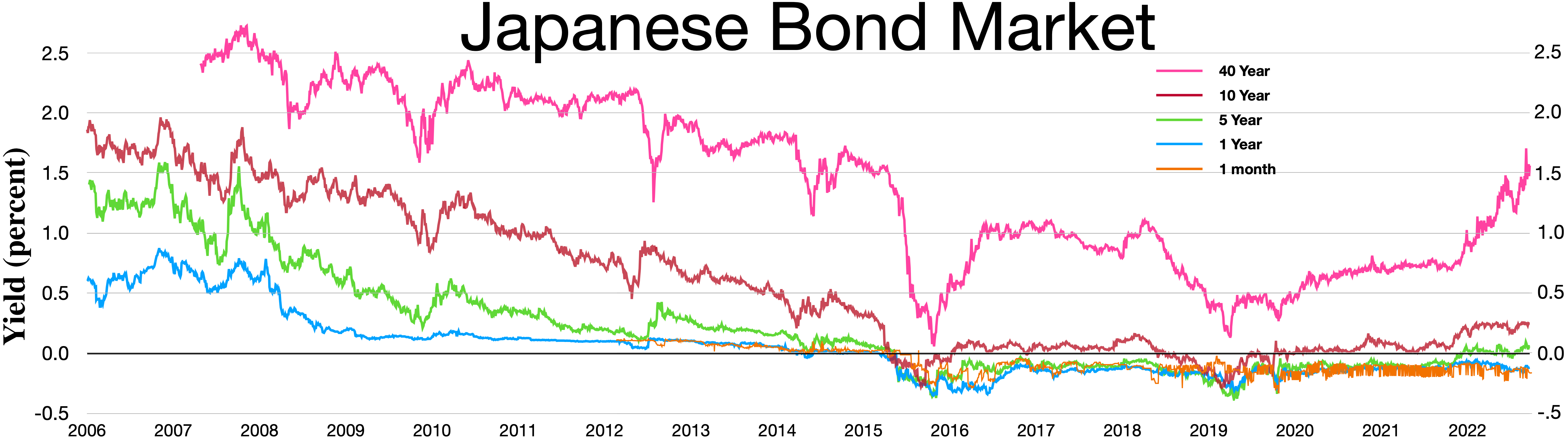
Japanese bond market Negative interest rates started in 2014. 40-year bond 10-year bond 5-year bond 1 year bond 1 month bond

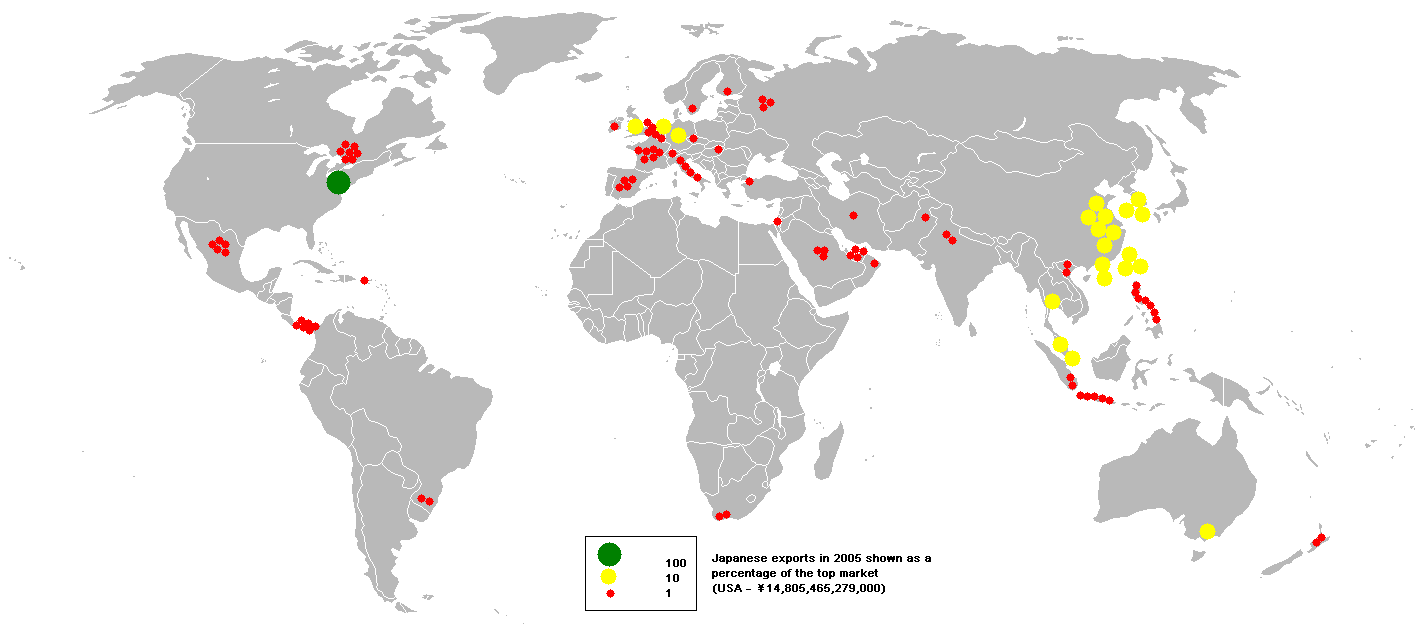
Japanese exports partners in 2005

Despite having interest rates down near zero for a long period of time, the quantitative easing strategy did not succeed in stopping price deflation. This led some economists, such as Paul Krugman, and some Japanese politicians, to advocate the generation of higher inflation expectations. In July 2006, the zero-rate policy was ended. In 2008, the Japanese Central Bank still had the lowest interest rates in the developed world, but deflation had still not been eliminated and the Nikkei 225 has fallen over approximately 50% (between June 2007 and December 2008). However, on 5 April 2013, the Bank of Japan announced that it would be purchasing 60–70 trillion yen in bonds and securities in an attempt to eliminate deflation by doubling the money supply in Japan over the course of two years. Markets around the world have responded positively to the government's current proactive policies, with the Nikkei 225 adding more than 42% since November 2012. In recent years, Japan has been the top export market for almost 15 trading nations worldwide.

The global economic recession of the late 2000s significantly harmed the economy of Japan. The nation suffered a 0.7% loss in real GDP in 2008 followed by a severe 5.2% loss in 2009. In contrast, the data for world real GDP growth was a 3.1% hike in 2008 followed by a 0.7% loss in 2009.

The Economist has suggested that improvements to bankruptcy law, land transfer law, and tax law will aid Japan's economy. In October 2009 the Japanese government announced plans to increase tobacco and green taxes while reducing rates for small and medium-sized companies, according to NHK. In 2011, Japan under Yoshihiko Noda decided to consider joining the Trans-Pacific Strategic Economic Partnership.

Although the Japanese economic miracle has already ended in the 1980s, the years of 2011 to 2012 saw the peak of the Japanese economy, exceeding over 6 trillion dollars in USD.

In December 2018, a free trade agreement between Japan and the European Union was cleared to commence in February 2019. It creates the world's largest free trade zone valued at 1/3 of global gross domestic product. This reduces tariffs on Japanese cars by 10%, duties by 30% on cheese and 10% on wines and opens service markets.

Economic policy over the past several quarters in Japan has been influenced by the 'Abenomics' debate, with the government pursuing aggressive government infrastructure spending hikes and significant yen devaluations.

== Reiwa era (2019–present) ==
Prior to the global COVID-19 recession, the 2019 4th quarter GDP shrank an annualized 7.1% from the previous quarter due to two main factors. One is the government's raise in consumption tax from 8% to 10%. The other is the devastating effects of Typhoon Hagibis, also known as the Reiwa 1 East Japan Typhoon (令和元年東日本台風, Reiwa Gannen Higashi-Nihon Taifū), or Typhoon Number 19 (台風19). The 38th depression, 9th typhoon and 3rd super typhoon of the 2019 Pacific typhoon season, it was the strongest typhoon in decades to strike mainland Japan, and one of the largest typhoons ever recorded at a peak diameter of 825 nautical miles (949 mi; 1,528 km). It was also the costliest Pacific typhoon on record, surpassing Typhoon Mireille's record by more than US$5 billion (when not adjusted for inflation). In the resort town of Hakone, record rainfall of almost a meter (942.3 mm, 37.1 inches) fell in only 24 hours. This adds to the effects of the COVID-19 pandemic on people's lives and the economy, the prime minister unveiling a "massive" stimulus amounting to 20% of GDP. In April 2020, Prime Minister Shinzo Abe announced that COVID-19 pandemic in Japan, which also forced a national state of emergency, gave the nation its worst economic crisis since the end of World War II. Jun Saito of the Japan Center for Economic Research stated that the pandemic delivered the "final blow" to Japan's long fledging economy, which also resumed slow growth in 2018. Two stimulus packages, in April and May 2020, injected 234 trillion yen (US$2.2 trillion), or almost 40% of Japan's GDP.

=== 2020–21 recession ===
Since early January 2020, Japanese economy began to suffer from the COVID-19 pandemic as several countries reported a significant increase in cases by March 2020. However, in early April, Japanese Prime Minister Shinzo Abe announced that he declared state of emergency, citing gave the nation its worst economic crisis since the end of World War II. Jun Saito of the Japan Center for Economic Research stated that the pandemic delivered the "final blow" to Japan's long fledging economy, which also resumed slow growth in 2018. Less than a quarter of Japanese people expect living conditions to improve in the coming decades.

In October 2020 during the pandemic, Japan and the United Kingdom formally signed the first free-trade agreement post-Brexit, which will boost trade by approximately £15.2 billion. It enables tariff-free trade on 99% of exports to Japan.

On 15 February 2021, the Nikkei average breached the 30k benchmark, the highest since November 1991. It is due to strong corporate earnings, GDP data and optimism over COVID-19 vaccination program in the country.

In the year ending of March 2021 despite COVID-19 spreading, SoftBank Group made a record net profit of 45.88 billion, which is largely due to the debut of e-commerce company Coupang. However, this is the largest annual profit by a Japanese company in the nation's history.

As of result, Japanese economic impact of COVID-19 was officially ended by early October 2021 as the country ahead of the endemic phase.

=== Post-recession (2021–present) ===
At the end of March 2022, the Ministry of Finance announced that the national debt reached precisely 1.017 million billion yen. The total public debt of the country, which includes debts contracted by local governments, represents 1.210 million billion yen (9,200 billion dollars) which is nearly 250% of Japan's GDP. Economist Kohei Iwahara said such an exceptional debt to GDP level is only possible because Japanese hold most of the debt: "Japanese households hold most of their savings in bank accounts (48%) and these sums are used by commercial banks to buy Japanese government bonds. Thus, 85.7% of these bonds are held by Japanese investors." However, an aging population could decrease savings.

== Timeline ==
- 1600, Foundation of Tokugawa shogunate, beginning of early modern industrialization
- 1868, Meiji Restoration, beginning of industrialization
- 1930s, Controlled economy
- 1945, Surrender of Japan: economic prostration; American Occupation
- 1948, Reverse Course Conservative governments
- 1950s, Recovery and growth.
- 1960, Income Doubling Plan
- 25 April 1971, End of the gold standard
- 22 September 1985, Plaza Accord
- 29 December 1989, Nikkei 225 average peaks at 38,915
- 1990s, "the Lost Decade", the time after Japan's economic bubble collapsed. The Nikkei 225 stock index bottomed out at 7603.76 in April 2003, moved upward to a new peak of 18,138 in June 2007, before resuming a downward trend.
- July 1997, start of the Asian financial crisis which caused several companies including Nissan Mutual Life Insurance and Yaohan to go bankrupt
- Post 2000, Bank of Japan begins quantitative easing strategy
- 2011, the Aftermath of the 2011 Tōhoku earthquake and tsunami had far-reaching economic consequences
- 2012, Abenomics Prime Minister Shinzō Abe's programme to help the country's economic recovery: the economics side is one part of a more general programme, which was commented on by Joseph Stiglitz.
- 2020, COVID-19 pandemic, with Abe announcing that Japan had encountered its worst economic crisis since the end of World War II.
- 2022, Japan's core consumer price inflation increased to 3.7%, the highest it has been since 1981.

== See also ==
- Bank of Japan
- Economy of Japan
- Economic relations of Japan
- Economics of feudal Japan
- History of Japan
- Japanese cuisine
- Keiretsu – a distinctive Japanese way in which firms are related
- Labor market of Japan
- Poverty in Japan
- Tokugawa coinage
- Japanese asset price bubble
- Lost Decade (Japan)
- Japanese economic miracle
