= Economics of feudal Japan =

In Feudal Japan between 1185 CE and 1868 CE, vassals offered their loyalty and services (military or other) to a landlord in exchange for access to a portion of land and its harvest. In such a system, political power is diverted from a central monarch and control is divided up amongst wealthy landowners and warlords. The initial widespread practice of feudalism in Japan coincided with the instatement of the first shogun, Minamoto no Yoritomo, who acted as the de facto ruler of Japan over the Japanese Emperor. At the same time, the warrior class (samurai) gained political power that previously belonged to the aristocratic nobility (kuge). The shogunates distributed estates (shoen) to loyal subjects, the most powerful of whom became daimyo, or governors of vast land masses who often had private armies.

Unlike in Medieval European feudalism, the supervisors of the land, known as jitos (stewards) and shugos (constables), did not initially own the land themselves, which remained under the shogunate's control. The daimyo used a portion of their income from taxation of peasants to pay the samurai, usually in rice. Over time, however, the most powerful jito and shugo (daimyo) began challenging the authority of the shogun, eventually leading to the collapse of the feudal system in the 19th century.

== Social and economic trends ==
=== Village nucleation ===
Village nucleation is the process by which villages become amalgamated, creating larger and more complex settlements resembling multifunctional regional hubs. Buildings were built closer to one another, with moats and walls becoming increasingly common. Appearing in Japan during the 13th century, this process was accelerated by the development of more advanced agricultural technology including double-cropping and increased fertilizer use. The coalescence of medieval villages gave way to the emergence of forts and castles, often along trade routes or rivers, which served as homes for daimyos (feudal lords) and local samurai groups. The increased size of the villages and their status as economic hubs facilitated contact with outsiders. Competition over natural resources increased as commerce grew throughout Japan. As a result, peasants, artisans, and merchants, relying on farmers for food, migrated toward these agricultural sites, creating urban centers for commerce. Peasants began speaking collectively, oftentimes engaging in disputes against their social superiors. This prompted the need for improved managerial strategy, leading to self-governing organizations.

=== Agriculture ===
The economy of early feudal Japan was based almost entirely on agriculture. With rice as the basis of trade, the landowners capable of producing the most rice quickly gained political and social authority. To gain the status of daimyo, one had to produce 10,000 koku of rice or an equivalent form of produce. The koku is a Japanese unit of measurement equal to about 180 litres, or 5 bushels. The power of feudal lords was often directly quantified by their output in koku rather than acreage of land ownership or military might. In fact, the amount of military service required from a vassal depended on the koku of their specific fief. Generally, a 1000-koku fief equated to one mounted warrior, two musketmen, one archer, and five pikemen. A measurement of potential income (kokudaka) was used to rank each estate and determine the order in which they would be evaluated by the Shogunal court.

=== Stability of the Edo period ===
The Edo period (1603-1868), also known as the Tokugawa period, began when Tokugawa Ieyasu became shogun. This era is marked by urbanization, an increase in domestic commerce, and a decrease in foreign commerce toward the mid-1600s. Transportation of produce from more distant rural areas to new towns became increasingly sought after. This resulted in a system of material transport and warehousing in Kyoto. Soon Kyoto became home to a central rice market and set prices through an auction system. The shogun held national authority while the daimyo firmly controlled the various regions across the archipelago. During this time, a clear hierarchy emerged, atop which sat the emperor (who in reality was a figurehead), followed by the shogun, daimyo, samurai, farmers, artisans, and merchants at the bottom. Merchants were seen as the lowest class because they produced nothing of their own, instead profiting from the production of others. However, with the rise of construction trades and banking facilities, merchant associations and rice brokers prospered. These merchants coalesced their shops around Dōjima, where the Rice Exchange was established in 1697 and where the world's first futures market would come to exist to sell rice that was not yet harvested. Though initially against futures trading, the shogun Tokugawa Yoshimune officially authorized the use of futures contracts in 1730 after the price of rice fell sharply, threatening the samurai's income. The declining economic position of the warrior class relative to the merchant class caused anxiety amongst the ruling parties who wished to maintain their dominance, leading to decreased regulation on trading policies. The Edo period ended as Japan opened its borders to western commerce.

=== Nanban Trade ===
Nanban Trade was a period of international trade that began in the Sengoku period around 1543 through contact between Japanese and Portuguese explorers and merchants. Quickly, global trade routes were established which exposed Japan to refined sugar, firearms, new shipbuilding techniques, and Christianity. Embargoes against Japan from China following naval clashes between the two empires had limited the supply of Chinese goods in Japan. Portugal viewed this as a profitable opportunity to act as an intermediary, since there was a high demand for Chinese goods in Japan, notably for silk yarn, which was highly sought-after commodity by the warrior classes. Similarly, the Chinese placed a high value of Japanese silver, creating a commerce market that the Portuguese were able to navigate with financial success. The civil war in Japan during the late 16th century also benefited Portuguese merchants, as daimyos competed with each other to offer more attractive trading conditions in their farms.

In the late 16th and early 17th century, Japanese Red Seal Ships as well as vessels from Spain, Holland, and England competed with Portuguese merchants, but Portugal still maintained a firm grasp on East Asian trade due to their prior negotiations and relationships with Chinese merchants. The period of Nanban trade declined in the early Edo period as the Tokugawa Shogunate worried about the spread of Christianity in Japan.

== Coinage ==
Up until the mid-thirteenth century, rice and sometimes silk (and other types of cloth) were primarily used as the medium of exchange in Medieval Japan. As a result of trade expansion beginning in the twelfth century, Chinese (and other foreign-made) coins were gaining popularity and were adopted as the preferred currency. In the late fifteenth century, copper coins began being distinguished by their quality with merchants only accepting high-quality coins and rejecting coins of lower quality through a process known as "shroffing" (or "selecting coins"). This process expanded as commodity trade grew and coins' demand began to exceed their supply. Shroffing created a divide in the value of coinage held by higher social classes, who had better access to high-quality coins, and lower classes, prompting anti-shroffing decrees from Japanese authorities.

Chinese coins entered the Japanese market through a variety of ways and created a circulation system with no state intervention. The copper coins, which were originally denounced as a viable form of currency by the imperial court in Japan, gained value through their issuance by the Chinese court. More important to the coins' value and credibility, however, were market forces in Japan, which determined prices before the state did.
