= Hirotsugu =

- Gender: Male

Origin
- Origin: Japanese
- Meaning: Different meanings depending on the kanji used

Hirotsugu or Hirotugu (written: 洋次, 広次 or 弘次) is a masculine Japanese given name. Notable people with the name include:

- Hirotugu Akaike (赤池 弘次; 1927–2009), Japanese statistician
- Hirotsugu Fukuhara (福原 広次; born 1945), Japanese cyclist
- Hirotsugu Nakabayashi (中林 洋次; born 1986), Japanese footballer
