= Muramatsu =

Muramatsu (written: 村松) is a Japanese surname. Notable people with the surname include:

- Arihito Muramatsu (村松 有人; born 1972), Japanese baseball coach and former player
- Chihiro Muramatsu (村松 千裕; born 1998), Japanese tennis player
- Daisuke Muramatsu (村松 大介; born 1977), Japanese football manager
- Haruki Muramatsu (村松 治樹; born 1977), Japanese darts player
- Jun Muramatsu (村松 潤; born 1982), Japanese former footballer
- Keita Muramatsu (村松 慶太), Japanese businessman
- Kota Muramatsu (村松 航太; born 1997), Japanese footballer
- Osamu Muramatsu (村松 修; born 1949), Japanese astronomer and discoverer of asteroids and comets
- Muramatsu Shigekiyo (村松 茂清; 1608–1695), Japanese Edo Period mathematician and curator
- Shōfu Muramatsu (村松 梢風; 1889–1961), Japanese novelist
- Taisuke Muramatsu (村松 大輔; born 1989), Japanese footballer
- Takatsugu Muramatsu (村松 崇継; born 1978), Japanese composer, arranger, music producer
- Tomoki Muramatsu (村松 知輝; born 1990), Japanese footballer
- Tomoko Muramatsu (村松 智子; born 1994), Japanese footballer
- Tomomi Muramatsu (村松 友視; born 1940), Japanese novelist
- Yasuko Muramatsu (村松 泰子; born 1944), Japanese development economist, author, women's rights activist
- Yasuo Muramatsu (村松 康雄; 1933–2024), Japanese actor, voice actor, narrator

== See also ==
- 5606 Muramatsu, a main-belt asteroid
- Muramatsu, Niigata (村松町), a town located in Nakakanbara District, Niigata, Japan
- Muramatsu Flutes, a Japanese company that manufactures flutes
