= Kotonomama Hachiman-gū =

Shinto shrine in Kakegawa, Shizuoka, Japan

Kotonomama Hachiman-gū 事任八幡宮
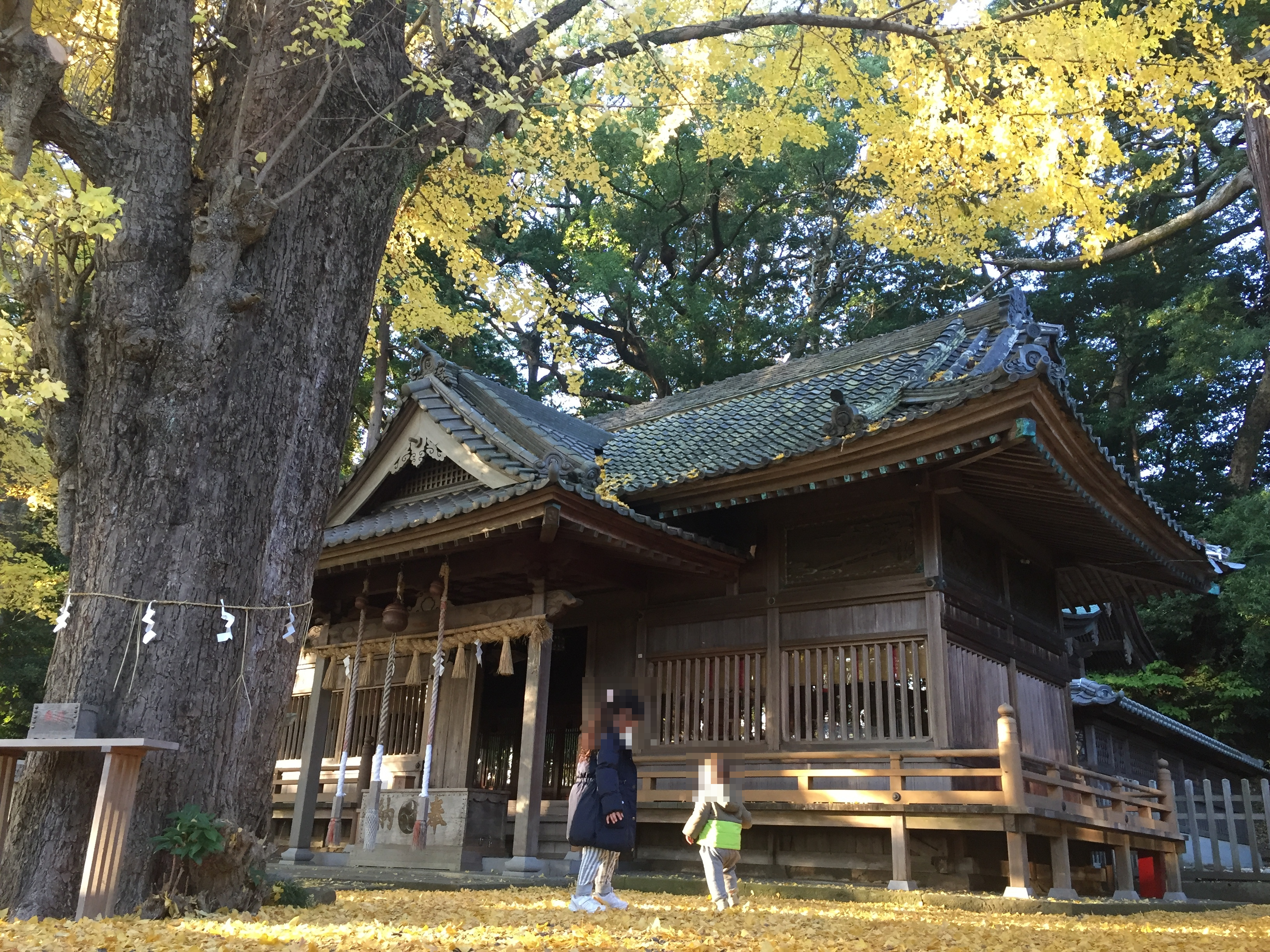
- Heiden of Kotonomama Hachiman-gū

- Location within Shizuoka Prefecture Location within Japan

Religion
- Affiliation: Shinto
- Deity: Kotonomachi-hime no mikoto Hachiman
- Festival: three days prior to Respect for the Aged Day in September

Location
- Location: 642 Yasaka, Kakegawa-shi, Shizuoka-ken 436-0004
- Interactive map of Kotonomama Hachiman-gū 事任八幡宮
- Coordinates: 34°47′54.20″N 138°04′31.54″E

Architecture
- Founder: Emperor Seimu
- Established: c.Kofun period

Website
- Official website

Kotonomama Hachiman-gū (事任八幡宮) is a Shinto shrine located in the city of Kakegawa, Shizuoka Prefecture, Japan. It is one of two shrines claiming the title of ichinomiya of former Tōtōmi Province, the other being the Oguni Jinja in the town of Mori The shrine's main festival is held annually three days prior to Respect for the Aged Day in September.

== Enshrined kami ==
The main kami at this shrine is Kotonomachi-hime no mikoto (己等乃麻知媛命), the mother of Ame-no-Koyane and the ancestor of the Nakatomi clan, and the Fujiwara clan. However, as that of the shrine implies, the main focus of the shrine is on the Hachiman trinity, which at this shrine are identified as Empress Jingū, Emperor Ōjin and Tamayori-hime.

== History ==
The foundation date of this shrine is unknown. The shrine's legend states that it was established by the Mononobe clan, who were the Kuni no miyatsuko during the reign of the legendary Emperor Seimu (131-190 AD), but nothing is known of its history prior to its appearance in the Engishiki records in the early Heian period. The shrine also claims that it was originally located on Mount Hongu to the north of the present site, and was relocated in 807 by Sakanoue no Tamuramaro. As the worship of Hachiman spread in the late Heian period, Minamoto no Yoriyoshi had a bunrei of the Iwashimizu Hachiman Shrine installed at this shrine in 1062, which was thereafter referred to as the Nissaka Hachiman-gu (日坂八幡宮) or simply Hachiman-gu (八幡宮). It has been referred to as the ichinomiya of Tōtōmi Province since the early Kamakura period. As the shrine of located near Nissaka-shuku on the Tōkaidō highway near the location of the feared Nakayama Pass, one of the three major obstacles on the Tōkaidō, travelers would make prayers and offerings at this shrine. This is mentioned many times in literature, from Sei Shōnagon's The Pillow Book, the Azuma Kagami of the Kamakura period and the Jippensha Ikku's Tōkaidōchū Hizakurige of the Edo Period. It was restored by Tokugawa Ieyasu in 1603, who gave it estates worth 100 koku for its upkeep. Following the Meiji Restoration, it was given the rank Prefectural shrine under the Modern system of ranked Shinto Shrines. The ancient name of "Kotonomama" was only revived after the end of World War II.

== Gallery ==
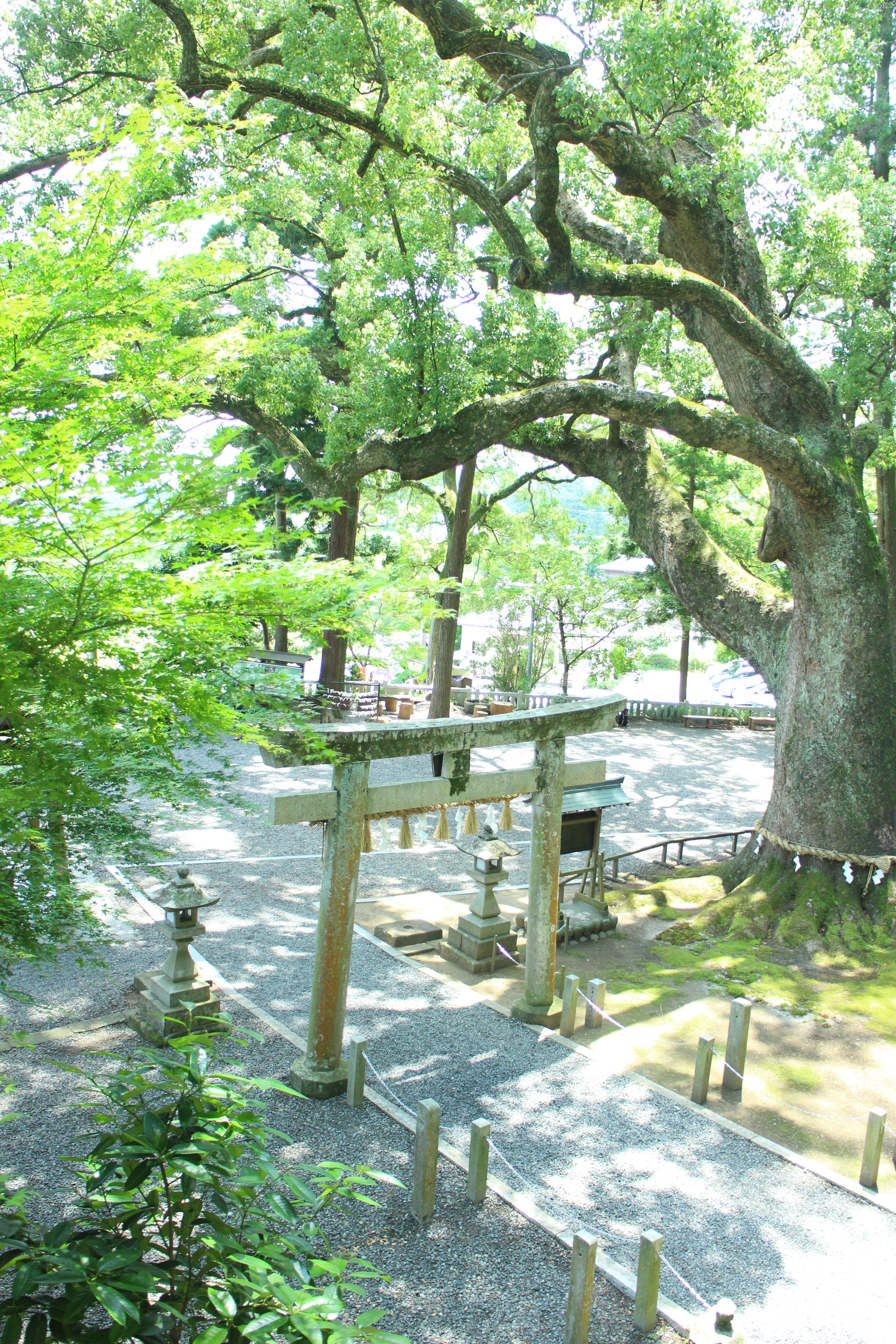
Second Torii

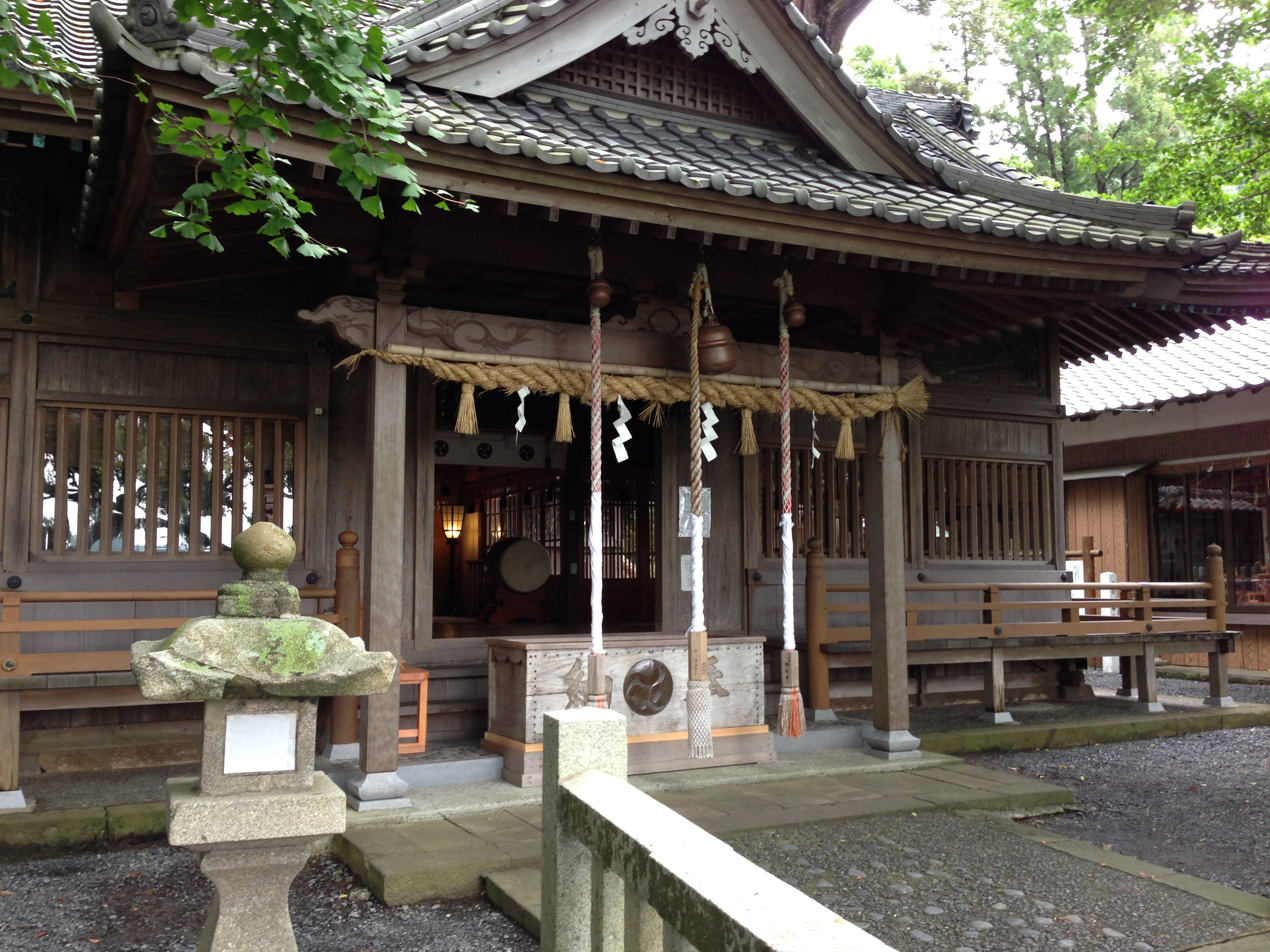
Heiden

== See also ==
- List of Shinto shrines
- Ichinomiya
