= Yasuhiro Wada =

Yasuhiro Wada may refer to:

- Yasuhiro Wada (video game designer), creator of the Story of Seasons (formerly Harvest Moon) video game series
- Yasuhiro Wada (Honda), Honda Racing F1 manager
