= Ichinomiya =

Shinto shrine with the highest rank in a province

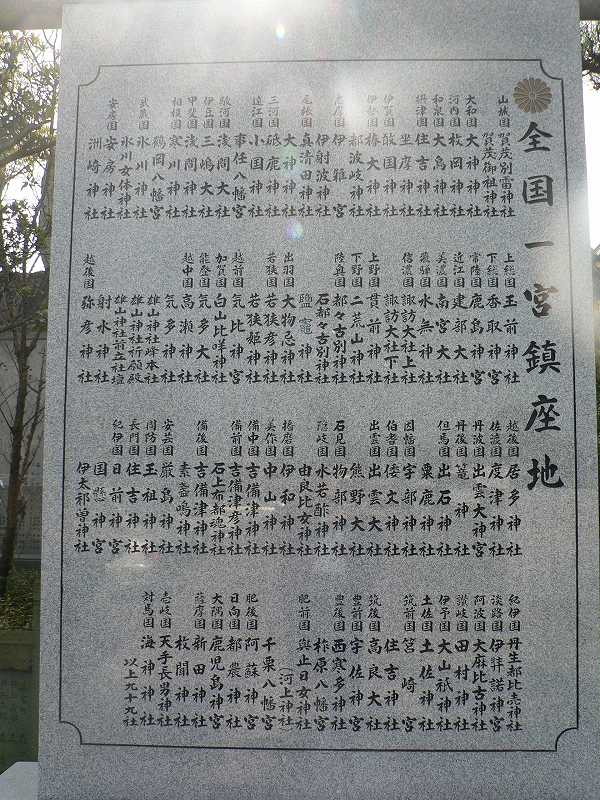
An engraving at the Tamura Shrine listing all the Ichimomiya

Ichinomiya (一宮; also 一の宮 or 一之宮; first shrine) is a Japanese historical term referring to the Shinto shrines with the highest rank in a province. Shrines of lower rank were designated ninomiya (二宮; second), sannomiya (三宮; third), shinomiya (四宮; fourth), and so forth.

The term gave rise to modern place names, such as the city of Ichinomiya, Aichi, named after Masumida Shrine in the former Owari Province.

== Overview ==
The term "Ichinomiya" literally means "first shrine" and is popularly regarded as the highest ranking shrine in each province. The second ranking shrine is referred to as the "Ninomiya" and third ranking shrine as "Sannomiya", and so on. However, there is no documentary material stipulating on how the shrines in each province are to be ranked, or even when this ranking system was created. As a general rule, all shrines designated "Ichinomiya" are of ancient origin and are listed in the Engishiki records completed in 927AD.

However, the shrine selected is not necessarily the largest, or oldest, in that province, and is not necessarily one of the "Myojin Taisha", which are regarded as the most important shrines. Rather, per the Ritsuryō legal and administrative system established in the Nara period, kokushi were appointed as imperial governors of each province. When the kokushi travelled from Heian-kyo to his local seat at the provincial capital, the first shrine he called upon officially in his province was the "ichinomiya".

As the purpose of this visit was to announce to the local kami of his appointment to office, it was important that this shrine be dedicated to important local deities and to be located close to the provincial capital. Even after the collapse of the Ritsuryō system by the Kamakura period, the ichinomiya continued to enjoy a certain prestige, and often after all vestiges of the provincial capital had fallen into ruins and its exact location lost, the term "Ichinomiya" was often preserved as a place name.

Tachibana Mitsuyoshi, a noted Shinto scholar in the early Edo Period, visited ichinomiya nationwide for 23 years starting 1675, and wrote the record of his travels in a 13 volume account. This began the popularization of pilgrimages by the common populace to these shrines. Under State Shinto, the ichinomiya were not accorded any special status. Many were accorded high ranks under the Modern system of ranked Shinto shrines.

=== Rivalry ===
While there can be only one "first shrine" in each province, several provinces have various rival candidates for the title. This has arisen for various reasons: relocation of the provincial capital can result in a new ichinomiya being appointed. In some cases, the merger of two provinces can result in two ichinomiya for the new province. In other cases, due to the ambiguity in the criteria for ichinomiya designation and due to conflicting ancient records, rival claimants have arisen.

== Shrines ==
Region	Province	Shrine		Location	Shrine ranking		
Region	Province	Name	Kanji	Location	Engishiki	Modern	Beppyo?
Kinai	Yamashiro	Kamo Shrine	賀茂神社	Kyoto, Kyoto	Myojin Taisha	Kanpei Taisha	Yes
Kinai	Yamato	Ōmiwa Shrine	大神神社	Sakurai, Nara	Myojin Taisha	Kanpei Taisha	Yes
Kinai	Kawachi	Hiraoka Shrine	枚岡神社	Higashiosaka, Osaka	Myojin Taisha	Kanpei Taisha	Yes
Kinai	Izumi	Ōtori taisha	大鳥大社	Sakai, Osaka	Myojin Taisha	Kanpei Taisha	Yes
Kinai	Settsu	Sumiyoshi-taisha	住吉大社	Osaka, Osaka	Myojin Taisha	Kanpei Taisha	Yes
Tōkaidō	Iga	Aekuni Shrine	敢国神社	Iga, Mie			
Tōkaidō	Ise	Tsubaki Grand Shrine	椿大神社	Suzuka, Mie			
Tōkaidō	Ise	Tsubaki Shrine / Nakato Shrine	都波岐神社・奈加等神社	Suzuka, Mie			No
Tōkaidō	Shima	Izawa-no-miya	伊雑宮	Shima, Mie			No
Tōkaidō	Shima	Izawa Shrine	伊射波神社	Toba, Mie			
Tōkaidō	Owari	Masumida Shrine	真清田神社	Ichinomiya, Aichi			
Tōkaidō	Mikawa	Toga Shrine	砥鹿神社	Toyokawa, Aichi			
Tōkaidō	Tōtōmi	Kotonomama Hachiman-gū	事任八幡宮	Kakegawa, Shizuoka			No
Tōkaidō	Tōtōmi	Oguni Shrine	小国神社	Shūchi-gun, Shizuoka			
Tōkaidō	Suruga	Fujisan Hongū Sengen Taisha	浅間神社	Fujinomiya, Shizuoka			
Tōkaidō	Izu	Mishima Taisha	三嶋大社	Mishima, Shizuoka			
Tōkaidō	Kai	Ichinomiya Asama Shrine (Fuefuki)	浅間神社	Fuefuki, Yamanashi			
Tōkaidō	Kai	Ichinomiya Sengen Shrine	浅間神社	Ichikawamisato, Yamanashi			No
Tōkaidō	Sagami	Samukawa Shrine	寒川神社	Kōza-gun, Kanagawa			
Tōkaidō	Musashi	Hikawa Shrine	氷川神社	Ōmiya-ku, Saitama			
Tōkaidō	Musashi	Ono Shrine	小野神社	Tama, Tokyo			No
Tōkaidō	Awa	Awa Shrine	安房神社	Tateyama, Chiba			
Tōkaidō	Awa	Susaki Shrine	洲崎神社	Tateyama, Chiba			No
Tōkaidō	Kazusa	Tamasaki Shrine	玉前神社	Ichinomiya, Chōsei-gun, Chiba			
Tōkaidō	Shimōsa	Katori Jingū	香取神宮	Katori, Chiba			
Tōkaidō	Hitachi	Kashima Jingū	鹿島神宮	Kashima, Ibaraki			
Tōsandō	Ōmi	Takebe taisha	建部大社	Ōtsu, Shiga			
Tōsandō	Mino	Nangū Taisha	南宮大社	Fuwa-gun, Gifu			
Tōsandō	Hida	Minashi Shrine	飛騨一宮水無神社	Takayama, Gifu			
Tōsandō	Shinano	Suwa-taisha	諏訪大社	Suwa, Nagano			
Tōsandō	Kōzuke	Nukisaki Shrine	一之宮貫前神社	Tomioka, Gunma			
Tōsandō	Shimotsuke	Futarasan Shrine	日光二荒山神社	Nikkō, Tochigi			
Tōsandō	Shimotsuke	Utsunomiya Futarayama Shrine	宇都宮二荒山神社	Utsunomiya, Tochigi			No
Tōsandō	Mutsu	Tsutsukowake Shrine	都都古和気神社	Higashishirakawa-gun, Fukushima			
Tōsandō	Mutsu	Shiogama Shrine	鹽竈神社	Shiogama, Miyagi			
Tōsandō	Dewa	Chōkaisan Ōmonoimi Shrine	大物忌神社	Akumi-gun, Yamagata			
Hokurikudō	Wakasa	Wakasahiko Shrine	若狭彦神社	Obama, Fukui			
Hokurikudō	Echizen	Kehi Shrine	氣比神宮	Tsuruga, Fukui			
Hokurikudō	Kaga	Shirayama Hime Shrine	白山比咩神社	Hakusan, Ishikawa			
Hokurikudō	Noto	Keta Taisha	気多大社	Hakui, Ishikawa			
Hokurikudō	Etchū	Takase Shrine	高瀬神社	Nanto, Toyama			Formerly
Hokurikudō	Etchū	Keta Shrine	気多神社	Takaoka, Toyama			No
Hokurikudō	Etchū	Oyama Shrine	雄山神社	Nakaniikawa-gun, Toyama			
Hokurikudō	Etchū	Imizu Shrine	射水神社	Takaoka, Toyama			
Hokurikudō	Echigo	Yahiko Shrine	彌彦神社	Nishikanbara-gun, Niigata			
Hokurikudō	Echigo	Kota Shrine	居多神社	Jōetsu, Niigata			No
Hokurikudō	Echigo	Amatsu Shrine	天津神社	Itoigawa, Niigata			No
Hokurikudō	Sado	Watatsu Shrine	度津神社	Sado, Niigata			
San'indō	Tamba	Izumo-daijingū	出雲大神宮	Kameoka, Kyōto			Formerly
San'indō	Tango	Kono Shrine	籠神社	Miyazu, Kyōto			
San'indō	Tajima	Izushi Shrine	出石神社	Toyooka, Hyōgo			
San'indō	Tajima	Awaga Shrine	粟鹿神社	Asago, Hyōgo			No
San'indō	Inaba	Ube shrine	宇倍神社	Tottori, Tottori			
San'indō	Hōki	Shitori Shrine	倭文神社	Tottori			
San'indō	Izumo	Izumo-taisha	出雲大社	Izumo, Shimane			
San'indō	Iwami	Mononobe Shrine	物部神社	Ōda, Shimane			
San'indō	Oki	Mizuwakasu Shrine	水若酢神社	Oki-gun, Shimane			Yes
San'indō	Oki	Yurahime Shrine	由良比女神社	Oki-gun, Shimane			No
San'yōdō	Harima	Iwa Shrine	伊和神社	Shisō, Hyōgo			
San'yōdō	Mimasaka	Nakayama Shrine	中山神社	Tsuyama, Okayama			
San'yōdō	Bizen	Kibitsuhiko Shrine	吉備津彦神社	Okayama, Okayama			
San'yōdō	Bitchū	Kibitsu Shrine	吉備津神社	Okayama, Okayama			
San'yōdō	Bingo	Kibitsu Shrine	吉備津神社	Fukuyama, Hiroshima			
San'yōdō	Aki	Itsukushima Shrine	厳島神社	Hatsukaichi, Hiroshima			
San'yōdō	Suō	Tamanooya Shrine	玉祖神社	Hōfu, Yamaguchi			No
San'yōdō	Nagato	Sumiyoshi Shrine	住吉神社	Shimonoseki, Yamaguchi			
Nankaidō	Kii	Hinokuma Jingū	日前神宮・國懸神宮	Wakayama, Wakayama			
Nankaidō	Kii	Niutsuhime Shrine	丹生都比売神社	Katsuragi, Wakayama			
Nankaidō	Kii	Itakiso Shrine	伊太祁曽神社	Wakayama, Wakayama			
Nankaidō	Awaji	Izanagi Jingū	伊弉諾神宮	Awaji, Hyōgo			
Nankaidō	Awa	Ōasahiko Shrine	大麻比古神社	Naruto, Tokushima			
Nankaidō	Awa	Ichinomiya Shrine	一宮神社	Tokushima, Tokushima			No
Nankaidō	Sanuki	Tamura Shrine	田村神社	Takamatsu, Kagawa			
Nankaidō	Iyo	Ōyamazumi Shrine	大山祇神社	Imabari, Ehime			
Nankaidō	Tosa	Tosa Shrine	土佐神社	Kōchi, Kōchi			
Saikaidō	Chikuzen	Sumiyoshi Shrine	住吉神社	Fukuoka, Fukuoka			
Saikaidō	Chikuzen	Hakozaki Shrine	筥崎宮	Fukuoka, Fukuoka			
Saikaidō	Chikugo	Kōra taisha	高良大社	Kurume, Fukuoka			
Saikaidō	Buzen	Usa Jingū	宇佐神宮	Usa, Ōita			
Saikaidō	Bungo	Sasamuta Shrine	西寒多神社	Ōita, Ōita			
Saikaidō	Bungo	Yusuhara Hachiman-gū	柞原八幡宮	Ōita, Ōita			
Saikaidō	Hizen	Yodohime Shrine	河上神社	Saga, Saga			No
Saikaidō	Hizen	Chikuri Hachiman-gū	千栗八幡宮	Miyaki, Saga			
Saikaidō	Higo	Aso Shrine	阿蘇神社	Aso, Kumamoto			
Saikaidō	Hyūga	Tsuno Shrine	都農神社	Tsuno, Miyazaki			
Saikaidō	Ōsumi	Kagoshima Shrine	鹿児島神宮	Kirishima, Kagoshima			
Saikaidō	Satsuma	Hirakiki Shrine	枚聞神社	Ibusuki, Kagoshima			
Saikaidō	Satsuma	Nitta Shrine	新田八幡宮	Satasumasendai, Kagoshima			
Saikaidō	Iki	Amanotanagao Shrine	天手長男神社	Iki, Nagasaki			No
Saikaidō	Tsushima	Kaijin Shrine	海神神社	Tsushima, Nagasaki			

== Ninomiya ==
Region	Province	Shrine		Location	Shrine ranking		
Region	Province	Name	Kanji	Location	Engishiki	Modern	Beppyo?
Kinai	Izumi	Izumi Anashi Shrine					
Tōkaidō	Ise	Tado Taisha					
Tōkaidō	Owari	Ōagata Shrine					Yes
Tōkaidō	Mikawa	Chiryu Shrine					
Tōkaidō	Tōtōmi	Mononobe Shrine (Kashiwazaki City)					
Tōkaidō	Tōtōmi	Rokuon Shrine					
Tōkaidō	Suruga	Toyosumi Shrine					
Tōkaidō	Izu	Asama Shrine (Mishima City)					
Tōkaidō	Kai	Miwa Shrine (Fuefuki City)					
Tōkaidō	Sagami	Kawakagi Shrine					
Tōkaidō	Musashi	Kanasana Shrine					
Tōkaidō	Musashi	Ninomiya Shrine (Akiruno City)					
Tōkaidō	Kazusa	Tachibana Shrine (Mobara City)					
Tōkaidō	Shimōsa	Tamazaki Shrine					
Tōkaidō	Shimōsa	Ninomiya Shrine (Funabashi City)					
Tōkaidō	Hitachi	Shizumi Shrine					
Tōsandō	Ōmi	Hiyoshi Taisha					Yes
Tōsandō	Mino	Ibuki Shrine					
Tōsandō	Shinano	Ono Shrine & Yahiko Shrine					
Tōsandō	Kōzuke	Ninomiya Akagi Shrine					
Tōsandō	Mutsu	Isasumi Shrine					
Tōsandō	Dewa	Kinowa Shrine					
Hokurikudō	Echizen	Tsurugi Shrine					
Hokurikudō	Kaga	Sugo Ishibe Shrine					
Hokurikudō	Noto	Isurugi Hiko Shrine					
San'indō	Hōki	Ōgamiyama Shrine					
San'indō	Izumo	Sada Shrine					
San'yōdō	Aki	Hayatani Shrine					
Nankaidō	Awaji	Yamato Okunitama Shrine					
Saikaidō	Higo	Kosa Shrine					

=== Sannomiya ===
Region	Province	Shrine		Location	Shrine ranking		
Region	Province	Name	Kanji	Location	Engishiki	Modern	Beppyo?
Kinai	Izumi	Hijiri Shrine (Izumi City)					
Tōkaidō	Owari	Atsuta Jingu					Yes
Tōkaidō	Mikawa	Sanage Shrine					
Tōkaidō	Suruga	Miho Shrine (Shizuoka)					
Tōkaidō	Izu	Sengen Shrine (Mishima City)					
Tōkaidō	Kai	Tamamoro Shrine					
Tōkaidō	Sagami	Hibita Shrine					
Tōkaidō	Hitachi	Yoshida Shrine (Mito City)					
Tōsandō	Ōmi	Taga-taisha					Yes
Tōsandō	Mino	Tagi Shrine					
Tōsandō	Kōzuke	Sannomiya Shrine (Yoshioka Town)					
Tōsandō	Shimotsuke	Murahi Shrine					
Tōsandō	Dewa	Omoimi Shrine					
Hokurikudō	Echigo	Hakkai Shrine					
San'indō	Tajima	Mizutani Shrine					
San'yōdō	Suō	Nikabe Shrine					
Saikaidō	Hizen	Tenzan Shrine					

=== Shinomiya ===
- Chichibu Shrine - Musashi Province
- Ishimaki Shrine - Mikawa Province
- Kaina Shrine - Kai Province, also Soja shrine of the province
- Sakitori Shrine - Sagami Province
- Tsugawa Shrine - Izumi Province

=== Gonomiya ===
- Hine Shrine - Izumi Province
- Wakaikaho Shrine - Kōzuke Province

== See also ==
- Fuchū
- Kokubunji
- List of Shinto shrines
- Modern system of ranked Shinto Shrines
- Sannomiya
- Sōja (Shinto)
- Twenty-Two Shrines
