= Yoshikata Yoda =

Japanese screenwriter (1909–1991)

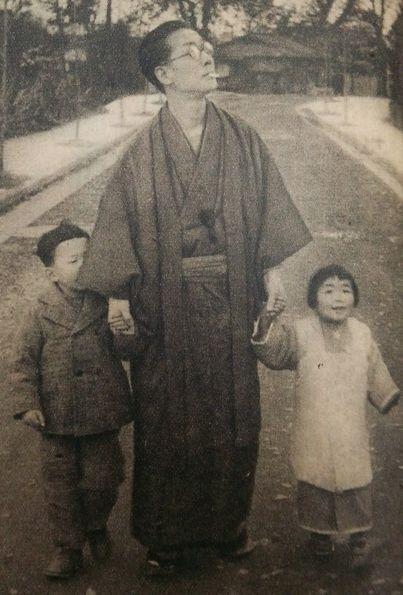
- Yoda in 1948
- Born: 14 April 1909; Kyoto, Japan
- Died: 14 November 1991 (aged 82)
- Occupation: Screenwriter
- Years active: 1931-1989

Yoshikata Yoda (依田義賢, Yoda Yoshikata) (14 April 1909 – 14 November 1991) was a Japanese screenwriter. He wrote for more than 130 films between 1931 and 1989. He is most famous for his work with Kenji Mizoguchi. He wrote for the film Bushido, Samurai Saga, which won the Golden Bear at the 13th Berlin International Film Festival.

== Selected filmography ==
- Osaka Elegy (1936)
- Sisters of the Gion (1936)
- The Story of the Last Chrysanthemums (1939)
- The 47 Ronin (1941)
- Utamaro and His Five Women (1946)
- Women of the Night (1948)
- Miss Oyu (1951)
- The Lady of Musashino (1951)
- The Life of Oharu (1952)
- Ugetsu (1953)
- A Geisha (1953)
- Sansho the Bailiff (1954)
- The Woman in the Rumor (1954)
- The Crucified Lovers (1954)
- Princess Yang Kwei-Fei (1955)
- Tōjūrō no Koi (1955)
- Zangiku monogatari (1956)
- Stepbrothers (1957)
- Bushido, Samurai Saga (1963)
- Nemuri Kyōshirō manji giri (1969)
- Ogin-sama (1978)
- Tempyō no Iraka (1980)
- Death of a Tea Master (1989)
