= Enden Station =

Railway station in Mori, Shizuoka Prefecture, Japan

Enden Station 円田駅
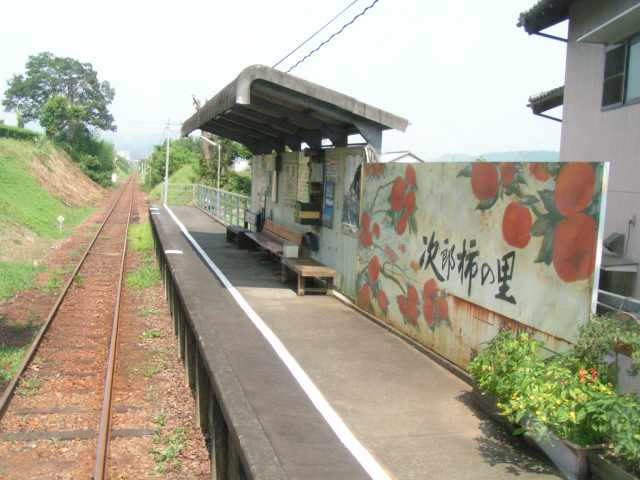
- Enden Station in August 2006

General information
- Location: Enden, Mori-machi, Shūchi-gun, Shizuoka-ken; Japan
- Coordinates: 34°49′14″N 137°54′24″E
- Operator: Tenryū Hamanako Railroad
- Line: ■ Tenryū Hamanako Line
- Distance: 14.7 kilometers from Kakegawa
- Platforms: 1 side platform

Other information
- Status: Unstaffed
- Website: Official website

History
- Opened: March 13, 1988

Passengers
- FY2016: 40 daily
Location
- Location within Shizuoka Prefecture Location within Japan

Enden Station (円田駅, Enden-eki) is a railway station in the town of Mori, Shizuoka Prefecture, Japan, operated by the third sector Tenryū Hamanako Railroad.

== Lines ==
Enden Station is served by the Tenryū Hamanako Line, and is located 14.7 kilometers from the starting point of the line at Kakegawa Station.

== Station layout ==
The station has one side platform serving a single track with a small wooden shelter built onto the platform. The station is unattended.

== Adjacent stations ==
«	Service	»
Tenryū Hamanako Railroad
Tenryū Hamanako Line
Morimachibyōin-mae	-	Tōtōmi-Ichinomiya

== Station History ==
Enden Station was established on March 13, 1988 as a commuter station.

== Passenger statistics ==
In fiscal 2016, the station was used by an average of 40 passengers daily (boarding passengers only).

== Surrounding area ==
The station is located in a residential area.

== See also ==
- List of railway stations in Japan
