= Mononobe Shrine =

Shinto shrine in Ōda, Shimane prefecture, Japan

Mononobe Jinja 物部神社
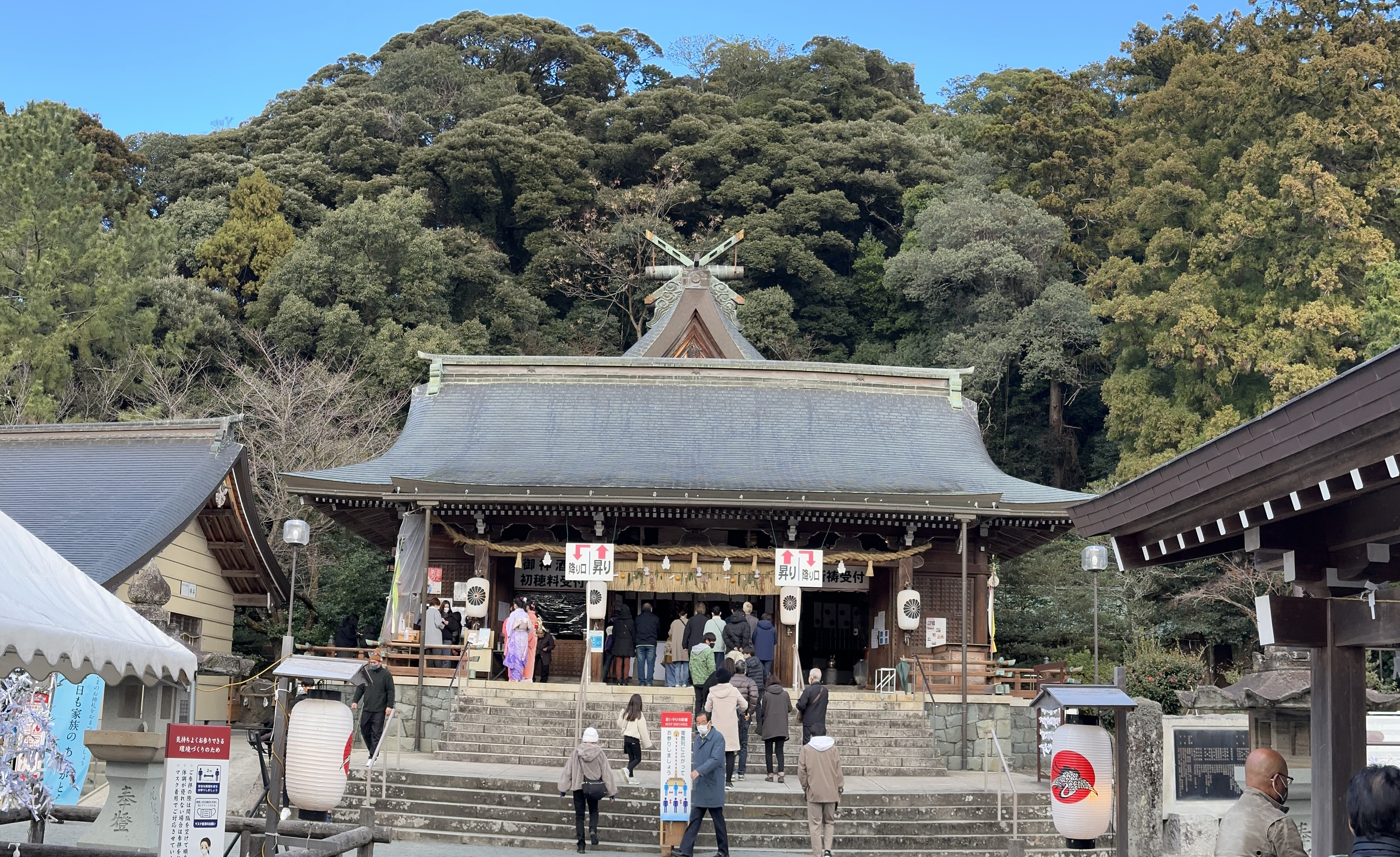
- Main area of Mononobe Jinja

- Location within Shimane Prefecture Location within Japan

Religion
- Affiliation: Shinto
- Deity: Umashimazu-no-Mikoto
- Festivals: January 7 and on November 24

Location
- Location: 1545 Kawai, Kawai-cho, Ōda-shi, Shimane-ken
- Interactive map of Mononobe Jinja 物部神社
- Coordinates: 35.16919°N 132.58406°E

Architecture
- Style: Kasuga-zukuri
- Established: unknown

Mononobe Jinja (物部神社) is a Shinto shrine in the Kawai-cho neighborhood of the city of Ōda in Shimane Prefecture, Japan. It is the ichinomiya of former Iwami Province. The main festivals of the shrine are held annually on January 7 and on November 24.

== Enshrined kami ==
The kami enshrined at Mononobe Jinja are:

- Umashimazu-no-Mikoto (宇摩志麻遅命), the founder of the Mononobe clan and god of rituals
- Nigihayahi no Mikoto (饒速日命), the father of Umashimazu
- Futsu-no-mitama (布都御魂), a spirit sword
- Ame-no-Minakanushi (天御中主大神), one of the godson creation
- Amaterasu (天照皇大神), the Sun goddess

== History ==
The origins of Mononobe Jinja are unknown. According to the shrine's legend, Umashimaji, the son of Nigihayahi, helped Emperor Jimmu's conquest of Yamato, and then led his clan to settle in Mino and Koshi Province, eventually dying in Iwami. He was buried in a kofun on Mount Yaoyama, behind the current shrine, and in 514, Emperor Keitai ordered that a shrine be built at the southern foot of the mountain. It first appears in the historical record in 869 AD, and the Engishiki records from the early Heian period list it as only a small shrine. However, it was regarded as the ichinomiya of the province from this time. The hereditary kannushi of this shrine, the Kaneko family, were one of only 14 priestly families to hold a noble title and held the rank of danshaku (baron) under the kazoku peerage.

During the Meiji period era of State Shinto, the shrine was rated as a National shrine, 2nd rank (国幣中社, Kokuhei Shosha) under the Modern system of ranked Shinto Shrines.

The shrine is located ten minutes by car from Ōdashi Station on the JR West Sanin Main Line.

== Cultural Properties ==
=== National Important Cultural Properties ===
- Tachi Sword (太刀), Kamakura period, signed "Ryokai", who was a master of the Yamashiro school. The sword has a length of 64.5 cm, and was donated to the shrine by Ōuchi Yoshitaka in 1542

=== Shimane Prefecture Designated Tangible Cultural Properties ===
- Tachi Sword (太刀), Nanboku-cho period,
- Honden (本殿), Edo period (1856),

== Gallery ==
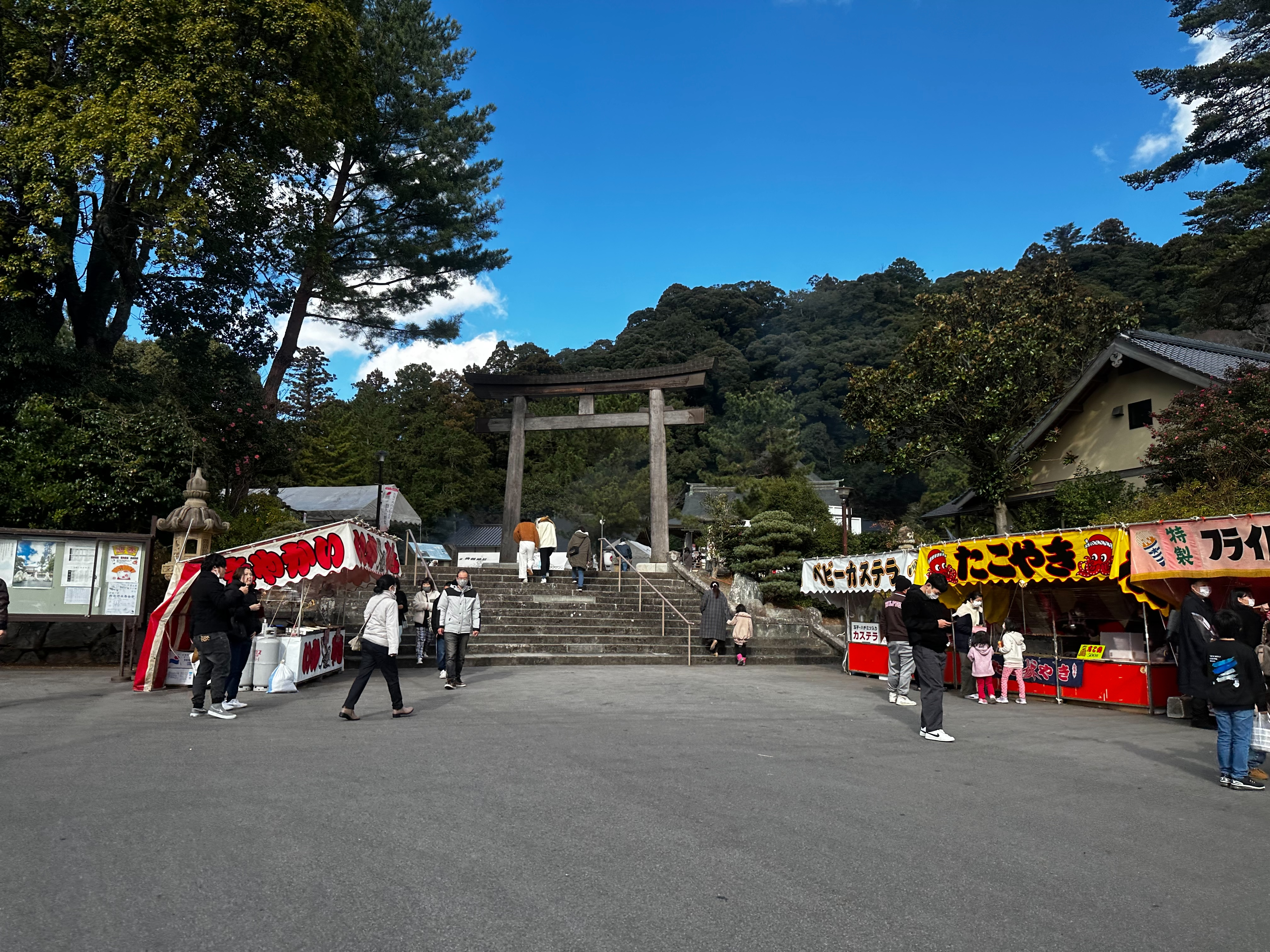
Entry to the shine

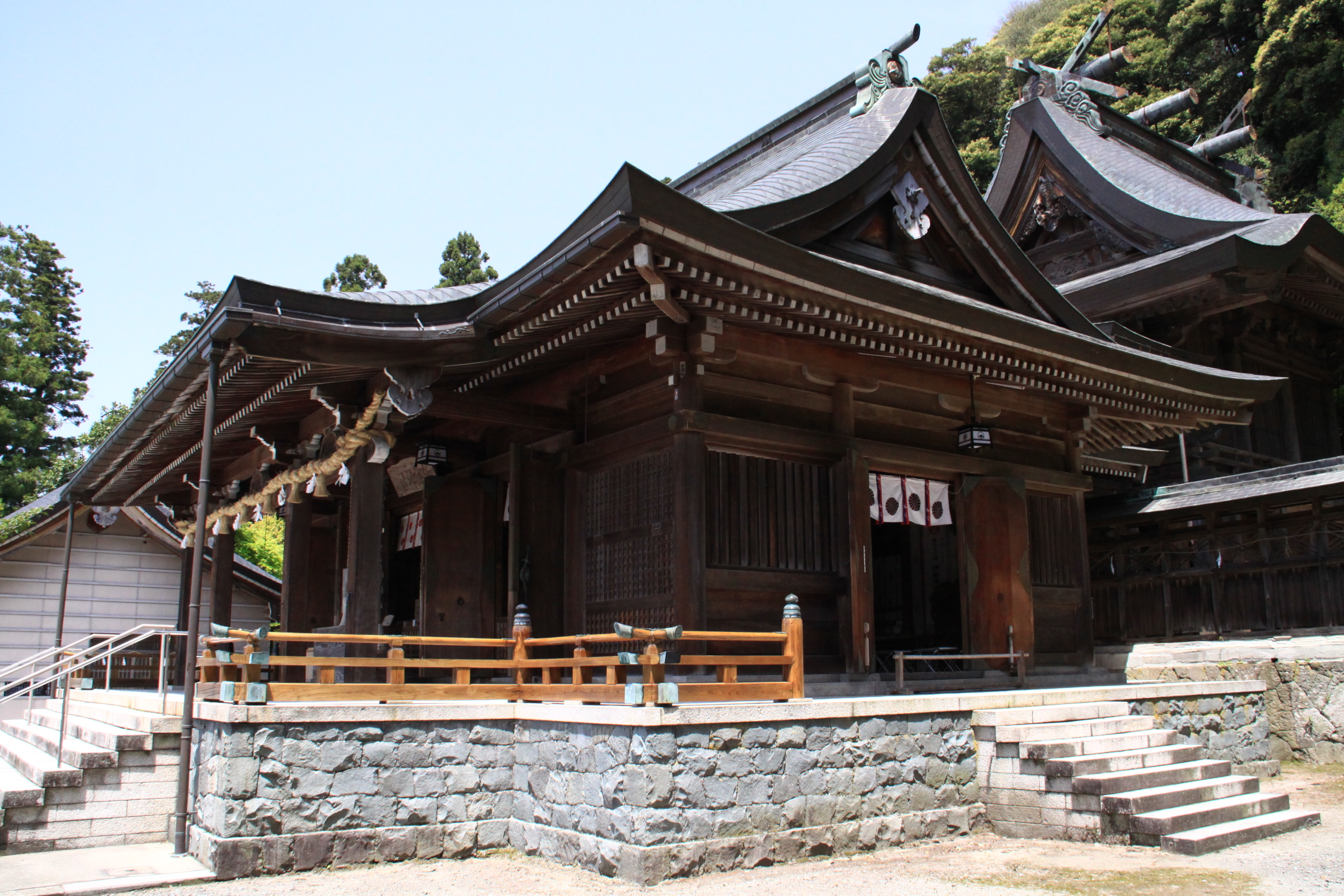
Haiden, built in 1938

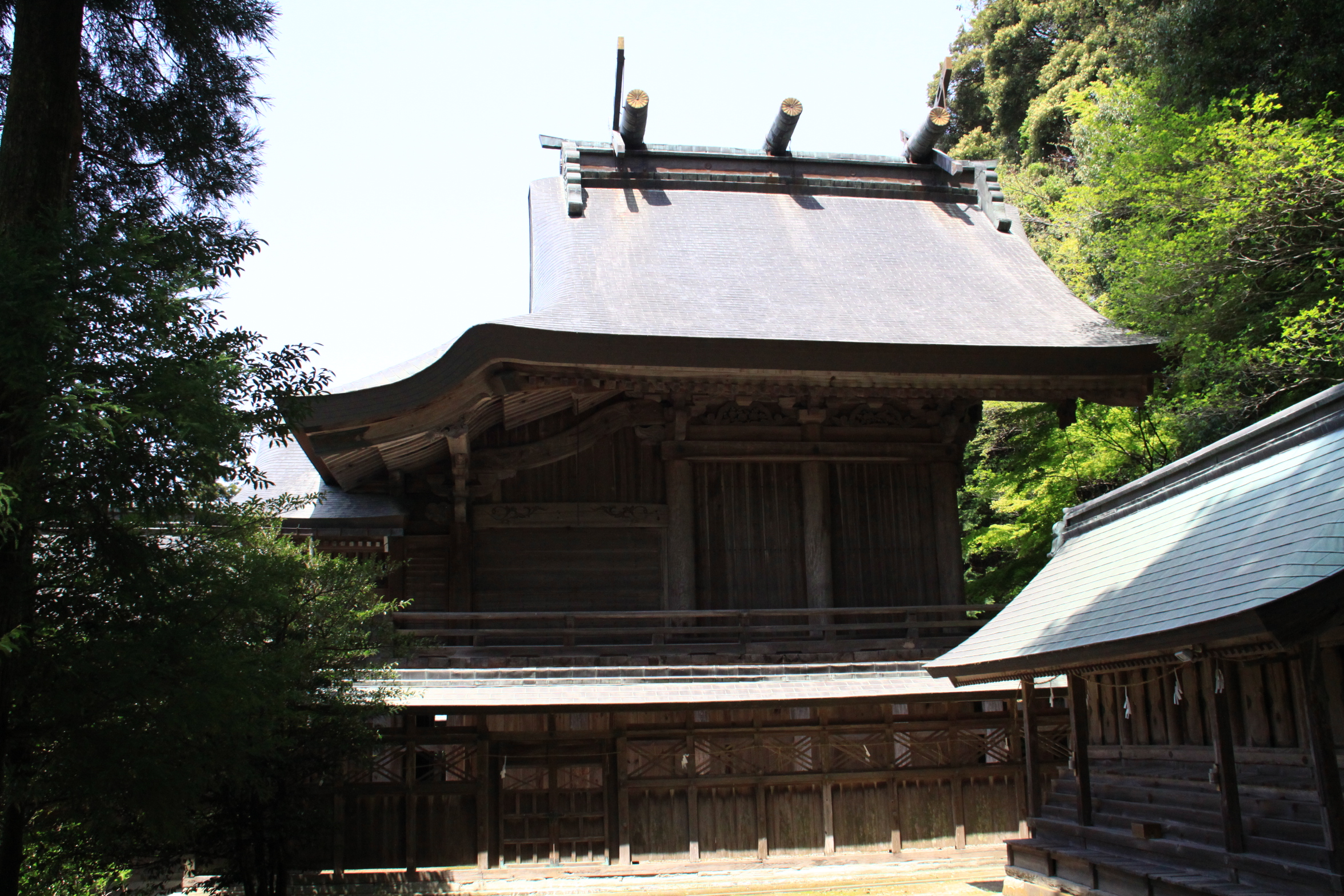
Honden, built in 1753, remodeled in 1856 (Shimane Prefectural Tangible Cultural Property)

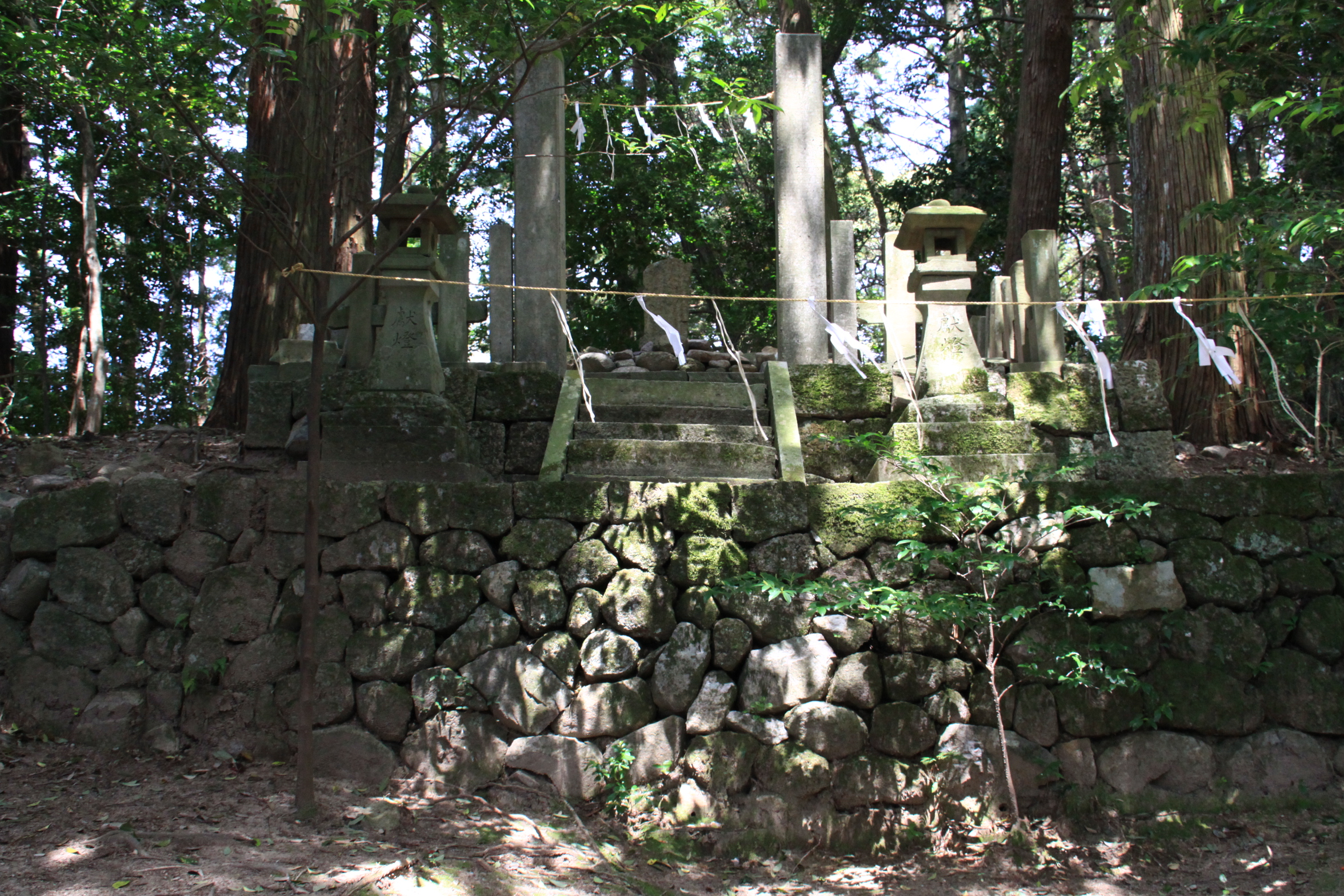
Kofun containing tomb of Umashimazu

== See also ==
- List of Shinto shrines
- Ichinomiya
