= Tokyo Gakugei University =

National university in Japan

Coordinates: 35.7065°N 139.4902°E

- 東京学芸大学
- Type: Public (national)
- Established: 1873 (chartered 1949)
- President: Kokubun Mitsuru
- Administrative staff: 212
- Undergraduates: 4,408
- Postgraduates: 486
- Location: Koganei, Tokyo, Japan
- Colors: Purple, green & black
- Website: u-gakugei.ac.jp

Tokyo Gakugei University (東京学芸大学, Tōkyō gakugei daigaku) is a national university in Koganei, Tokyo. Founded in 1873, it was chartered as a university in 1949. It is also known as Gakudai (学大) and TGU, for short.

In addition to its Koganei campus, it also maintains a number of attached public schools offering curricula in elementary, secondary, and special education at various locations in the greater Tokyo area. The university has a strong reputation in education-related fields, playing a national role in the development of educational policy and innovations in teacher education.

== History ==
Tokyo Gakugei University was founded in 1873. It was formally chartered as a university in 1949 through the merging of four teacher-training institutions.

In 1966, the Graduate School of Tokyo Gakugei University was established, and since 1996 it has offered Doctoral degrees in the education field as part of a coalition of educational institutions that include Chiba University, Saitama University, and Yokohama National University.

In recent years, Tokyo Gakugei University has developed programs to better accommodate professional school teachers, including evening and short-term courses. The university also houses a number of national research centres in education-related fields.

== Faculties ==
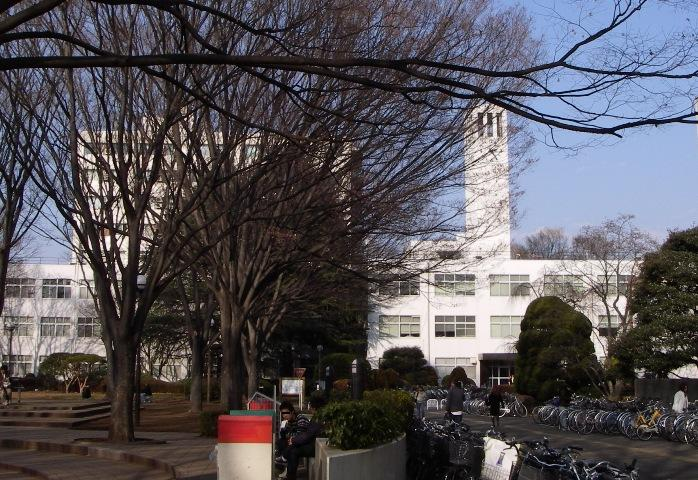
- The Humanities and Social Sciences Research Building
  A Course: The department of Elementary school's teacher training
- B Course: The department of Junior high school and high school's teacher training
- C Course: The department of Special school's teacher training
- L Course: The department of Long-Life Studying
- N Course: The department of Human Welfare Studying
- K Course: The department of International Understanding and Education
- F Course: The department of Environmentalogy
- J Course: The department of Information Studying
- G Course: The department of Art and Cultural Studies

== Notable alumni and affiliates ==
- Keiko Abe, marimbist
- Mamoru Oshii, filmmaker
- Ichiro Saito, conductor
- Satoko Inoue, pianist
- David Hebert, musician/musicologist
- Eric Van Hove, contemporary artist
- Yasuko Muramatsu, president (2010 to 2014)
- Yoshiyuki Yoshida, Judoka/professional mixed martial artist
- Hideki Kuriyama, baseball manager
- Natsumi Tsunoda, Judoka
- Chinatsu Akasaki, voice actress
