= Zangiku monogatari (1956 film) =

1956 Japanese film

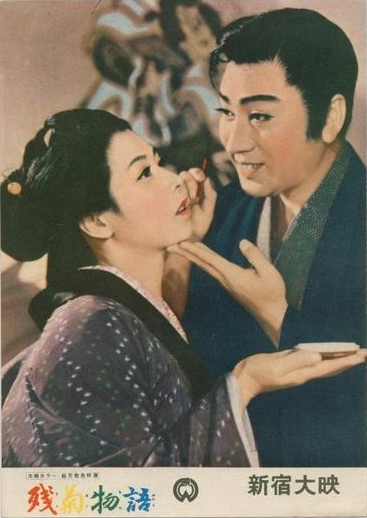
- Japanese movie poster featuring Chikage Awashima (on the left) and Kazuo Hasegawa (on the right)
- Directed by: Koji Shima
- Screenplay by: Yoshikata Yoda
- Story by: Shōfū Muramatsu
- Produced by: Masaichi Nagata
- Starring: Kazuo Hasegawa; Chikage Awashima; Tamao Nakamura; Mitsuko Yoshikawa
- Cinematography: Shin'ichi Nagai
- Edited by: Shigeo Nishida
- Music by: Seitaro Omori
- Production company: Daiei Motion Picture Company
- Distributed by: Daiei Motion Picture Company
- Release date: April 23, 1956 (Japan)
- Running time: 112 minutes
- Country: Japan
- Language: Japanese

Zangiku monogatari (Japanese: 残菊物語) is a 1956 black-and-white Japanese film directed by Koji Shima.

== Cast ==
- Kazuo Hasegawa
- Chikage Awashima
- Tamao Nakamura
- Mitsuko Yoshikawa

== See also ==
- The Story of the Last Chrysanthemum (残菊物語 Zangiku monogatari) (1939) by Kenji Mizoguchi
