= Ono Shrine =

Shinto shine in Tama, Tōkyō, Japan

Ono Jinja 小野神社
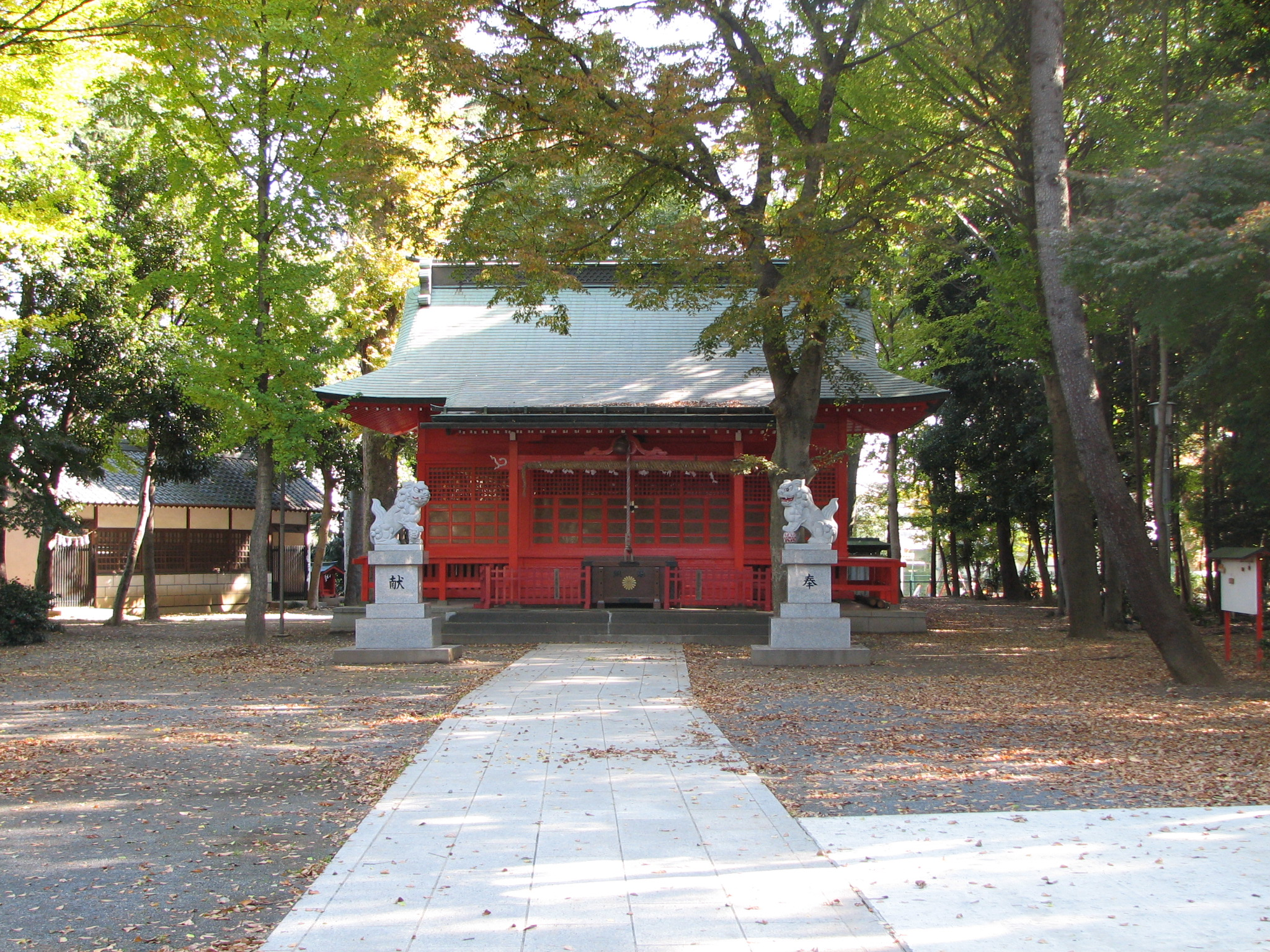
- Haiden of Ono Jinja Shrine

- Location within Tokyo Location within Japan

Religion
- Affiliation: Shinto
- Festival: second Sunday of September

Location
- Location: 1-18-8 Ichinomiya, Tama-shi, Tokyo-to
- Interactive map of Ono Jinja 小野神社
- Coordinates: 35°39′10.81″N 139°26′32.18″E

Architecture
- Established: unknown

Ono Jinja (小野神社) is a Shinto shrine in the Ichinomiya neighborhood of the city of Tama in Tokyo Metropolis, Japan. It is one of the two shrines claiming the title of ichinomiya of former Musashi Province. The main festival of the shrine is held annually on the second Sunday of September. During the Edo Period, it was also called the Ichinomiya Daimyōjin (一宮大明神).

== Enshrined kami ==
The kami enshrined at Ono Jinja are:

- Ame-no-shitaharu-no-Mikoto (天下春命), ancestor of the Chichibu Kuni no miyatsuko
- Seoritsu-hime no Mikoto (瀬織津比咩命)
- Izanagi no Mikoto (伊弉諾尊)
- Susanoo no Mikoto (素盞嗚尊)
- Ōkuninushi (大己貴大神)
- Ninigi (瓊々杵尊)
- Hikohohodemi no Mikoto (彦火火出見尊)
- Ukanomitama (倉稲魂命)

== History ==
The origins of Ono Jinja are unknown. The site of the provincial capital of Musashi Province are located nearby, and the shrine first appears in the historical record in 772, followed by a mention in the Nihon Sandai Jitsuroku in 884, and in the Engishiki, where it is listed as a minor shrine. It is styled as the "ichinomiya" of Musashi in the early Kamakura period Azuma Kagami and in the Nanboku-chō period Shintōshū.The shrine was rebuilt in the Sengoku period by the Late Hōjō clan and Ota Dokan and received a stipend in the Edo Period from the Tokugawa shogunate.

During the Meiji period era of State Shinto, the shrine was rated as a county shrine under the Modern system of ranked Shinto Shrines.

The shrine is located a six-minute walk from Seiseki-Sakuragaoka Station on the Keio Electric Railway Keio Line.

== Gallery ==
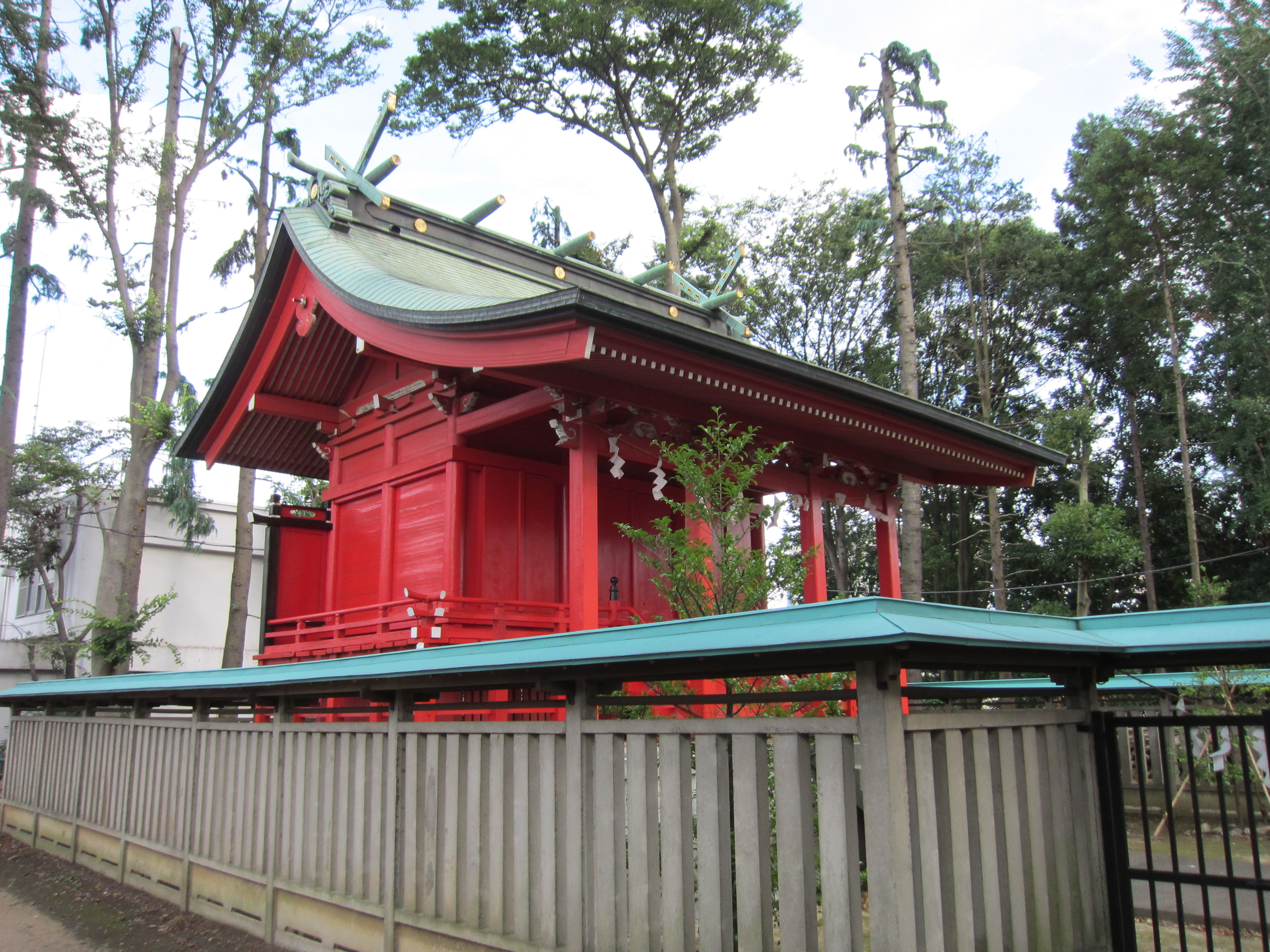
Honden

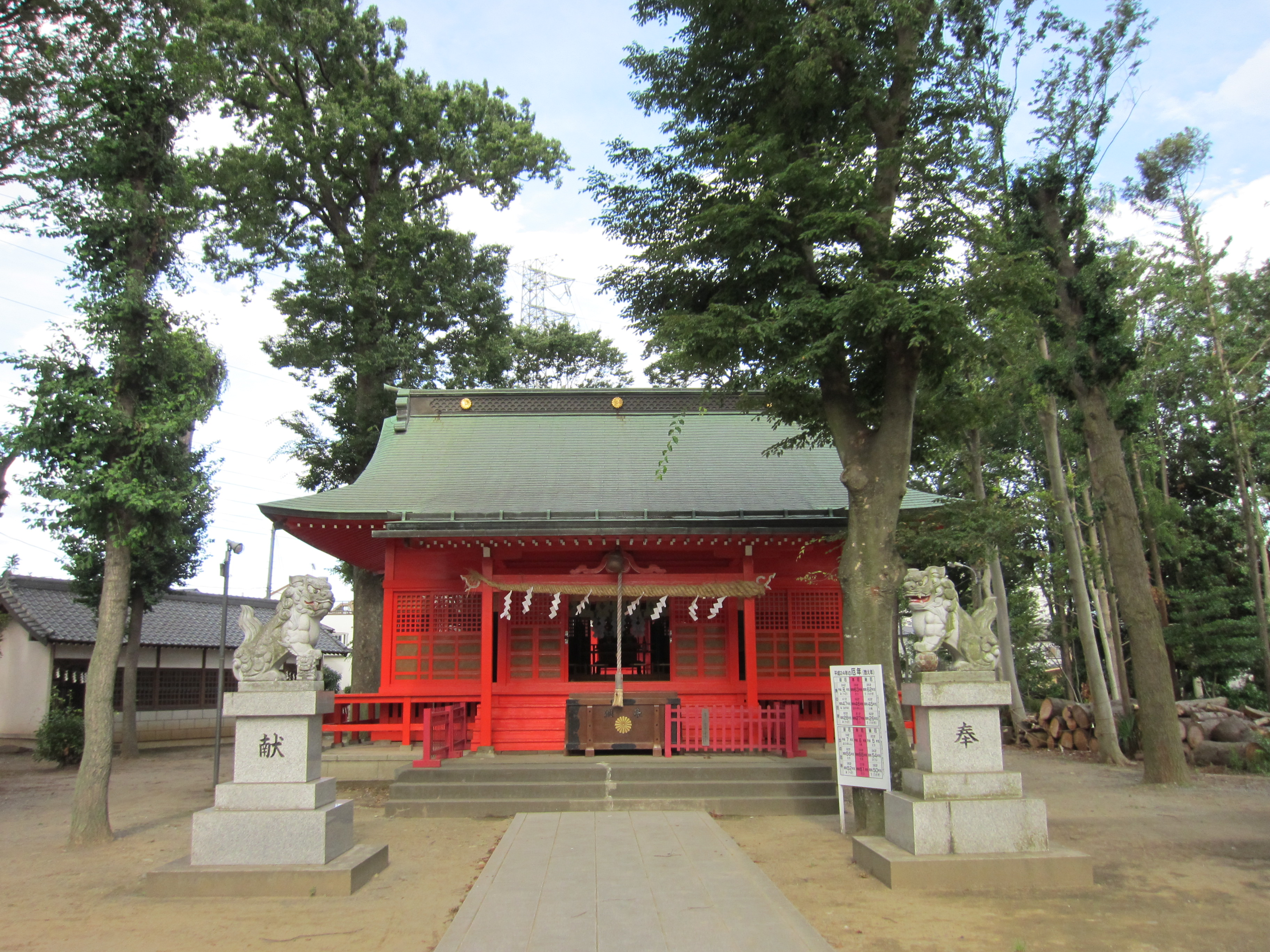
Haiden'

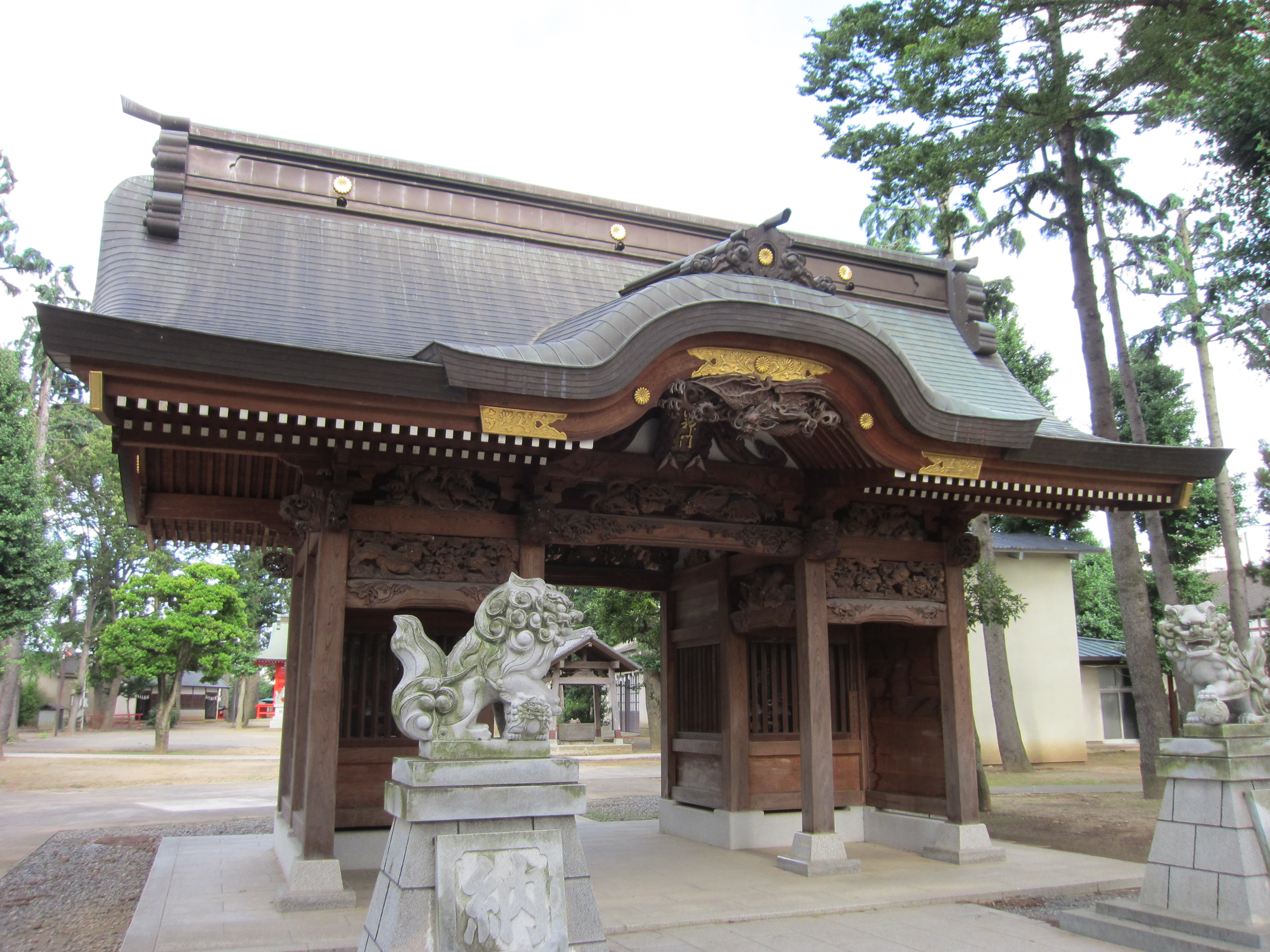
Zuishin-mon

== See also ==
- List of Shinto shrines
- Ichinomiya
