= The Story of the Last Chrysanthemums =

1939 Kenji Mizoguchi film

- Directed by: Kenji Mizoguchi
- Written by: Matsutarō Kawaguchi; Yoshikata Yoda
- Based on: Zangiku monogatari by Shōfu Muramatsu
- Produced by: Shintarō Shirai
- Starring: Shōtarō Hanayagi; Kōkichi Takada; Gonjurō Kawarazaki
- Cinematography: Yozō Fuji; Minoru Miki
- Edited by: Koshi Kawahigashi
- Music by: Shirō Fukai
- Production company: Shochiku
- Distributed by: Shochiku
- Release date: October 10, 1939
- Running time: 143 minutes
- Language: Japanese

The Story of the Last Chrysanthemum (1939) by Kenji Mizoguchi

The Story of the Last Chrysanthemums (残菊物語, Zangiku monogatari), also titled The Story of the Last Chrysanthemum and The Story of the Late Chrysanthemums, is a 1939 Japanese drama film directed by Kenji Mizoguchi. Based on a short story by Shōfu Muramatsu, it follows an onnagata (male actor specialising in playing female roles) struggling for artistic mastery in late 19th century Japan.

== Plot ==
Kikunosuke Onoe, commonly known as Kiku, is the adopted son of a famous Tokyo kabuki actor and is training to succeed his father in an illustrious career. While hypocritically praising Kiku's acting to his face, the rest of his father's troupe mock him behind his back. Otoku, who lives in the father's house as the wet nurse for the infant son of the father's biological child, is the only one honest enough to point out Kiku's artistic shortcomings and urge him to improve. When Otoku is dismissed by Kiku's family for being too close to the young master, which could lead to scandal, Kiku tracks her down and declares his intention to marry her. His family is outraged, and Kiku is forced to leave Tokyo, taking a train to Nagoya to hone his craft away from his father, much to the latter's fury.

One year later, Kiku is acting alongside his uncle, Tamiro Naritaya, in Osaka, but he remains dissatisfied. Otoku eventually finds Kiku and rekindles his inspiration. She becomes his common-law wife and continues to encourage him. When his uncle dies, Kiku is fired and forced to join a traveling troupe, and their life together becomes even more difficult. Four years later, Kiku and Otoku are on the road, with their fellow actors squabbling over small amounts of money. Kiku's character has changed to the point where he even strikes Otoku. Though she still loves him, his love for her has clearly faded. Their situation worsens, and Otoku becomes seriously ill.

Otoku goes to meet Kiku's brother to beg for an acting role for Kiku in Tokyo, allowing him to reclaim the family's famous name. His brother agrees on two conditions: first, that Kiku's acting has improved, and second, that he and Otoku separate, as this is necessary to reconcile with their father. Fuku, Kiku's brother, returns with Otoku to fetch Kiku.

Kiku delivers a bravura performance of the challenging and critical female role of Sumizome. He has finally found his niche and the fame he has always sought as a kabuki actor. Otoku watches sadly from the wings but is happy for him. The family agrees that Kiku may perform in Tokyo. As Kiku boards the train to Tokyo, Otoku cannot be found, and Fuku hands him a letter from her explaining everything. His companions urge him to continue to Tokyo to make Otoku's sacrifice worthwhile. Kiku becomes a success.

When the Tokyo troupe visits Osaka, they receive a triumphant welcome. Kiku's father allows Kiku to take pride of place in the river parade after the performance. However, the landlord informs Kiku that Otoku is gravely ill and will die that night. Kiku hesitates, as it is his evening of glory, but his father insists, reminding him of how much Otoku has helped him. Ultimately, Kiku's father accepts Kiku's marriage to Otoku, and Kiku shares this news with her. However, this reconciliation comes only when she is already on her deathbed (implied to be due to tuberculosis). Proud that Kiku is finally happy, Otoku urges him to join the river parade, as the audience is waiting to see and praise him.

She dies while the sounds of the theater's parade, led by her husband, can be heard in the distance.

== Cast ==
- Shōtarō Hanayagi as Kikunosuke Onoe (Kiku)
- Kōkichi Takada as Fukusuke Nakamura (Fuku)
- Gonjūrō Kawarazaki II as Kikugoro Onoue, the father
- Kakuko Mori as Otoku
- Tokusaburo Arashi VI as Shikan Nakamura
- Hideo Nakagawa as Tamiro Naritaya, the uncle
- Yōko Umemura as Osato
- Ryōtarō Kawanami as Eijū Dayū
- Yoshiaki Hanayagi as Tamijirō Onoe
- Kinnosuke Takamatsu as Matsusuke Onoe
- Nobuko Fushimi as Eiryū, a geisha
- Benkei Shiganoya as Genshun, a masseur

== Production ==
The Story of the Last Chrysanthemums was Mizoguchi's first film for the Shochiku studios after a short interlude at Shinkō Kinema. It was also the initial film of what was later regarded as a trilogy about theater during the Meiji period (the others being the lost A Woman of Osaka [Naniwa onna, 1940] and The Life of an Actor [Geidō Ichidai Otoko, 1941]). The film ranked 2nd in Kinema Junpo's list of best films of the year, and also won Mizoguchi an Education Ministry Award.

Muramatsu's short story was based on kabuki actor Kikunosuke Onoe II (尾上 菊之助(2代目), 1868–1897).

== Reception and Legacy ==
On the review aggregator website Rotten Tomatoes, 94% of 18 critics' reviews are positive. Many critics regard the film as Mizoguchi's major pre-war achievement, if not his best work, lauding its cinematography, marked by the use of long takes and frequent dolly shots, and emphasising its theme of female concern.

In his 1985 review for the Chicago Reader, Jonathan Rosenbaum pointed out Mizoguchi's "refusal to use close-ups" and argued that "the theme of female sacrifice that informs most of his major works is given a singular resonance and complexity here." Richard Brody, writing for The New Yorker, called it "one of the cinema's great outpourings of imaginative energy."

Jordan Hoffman, in a 2015 review for The Guardian, gave the film 4 out of 5 stars, praising its "bravura visual storytelling." John Pym praised the film's sets, which were "crammed with human detail," and, when "sometimes offset by shots of notably uncluttered spaces," highlighted "the isolation of the two principles in a teeming world dominated by class prejudice, harsh economics, and sheer blank human indifference."

The Story of the Last Chrysanthemums was selected for the Cannes Classics section of the 2015 Cannes Film Festival, where it was shown in a restored print.

== See also ==
- Zangiku monogatari (1956 film)
