= Yasuhiro Wada (Honda) =

Yasuhiro Wada (和田 康裕 Wada Yasuhiro, born 10 September 1951) is the Japanese former chairman of the defunct Honda F1 team and the general manager of the Honda Motor Motorsports Division.

== Career ==
=== Early career ===
Wada joined the Honda Motor Company in 1974 and worked until his promotion in 1985 to the American Honda division. After a further five years, Wada moved to the Honda PR Division before becoming a director of Honda Motor Europe in 1997.

=== Involvement in motorsports ===
Wada's involvement in motorsports started in the year 2000, when he was made the General Manager of the Honda Motor Motorsports Division, a position he still holds to this day. In 2005, amidst Honda's increasing financial stake and growing sporting influence in the BAR Formula One team, Wada was made a Management Board member of the BAR Honda Formula One team.

When Honda brought a controlling interest in the BAR team for 2006, renaming it Honda Racing Wada was confirmed in a similar role there too. Wada was a strong supporter behind Honda's decision to create Super Aguri. In April 2008, Wada stepped down to become the general manager Public Relation of Honda Motor. Keita Muramatsu succeeded as the General Manager of Motorsports Division with Hiroshi Oshima assumed overall responsibility of Motor Sports.

== Personal life ==
Wada was born in Tokyo, Japan on 10 September 1951 and he now lives with his wife in Oxford, England. Wada's hobbies include motorcycling, photography and model making.
