= Tomomi Muramatsu =

Japanese novelist (b. 1940)

- Born: April 10, 1940 (age 86); Tokoyo, Japan
- Occupation: Novelist

Tomomi Muramatsu (村松友視, Muramatsu Tomomi; born 10 April 1940) is a Japanese novelist active during the late Shōwa and Heisei eras.

== Early life ==
Muramatsu was born in Tokyo, but was raised in Shimizu, Shizuoka. His grandfather was the noted writer Muramatsu Shofu, and both his father and his mother worked for the literary magazine Chūōkōron. Muramatsu Tomomi attended Keio University's Literature Department, and on graduation went to work for Chūōkōron himself as an editor. On the early death of his father, he was adopted by his grandfather, Muramatsu Shofu, as his legal heir.

== Writing ==
His first published work, a collection of essays, Watashi puroresu no kyomi desu ("I am a Professional Wrestling Fan"), published in 1980, was a best seller and established him as a mainstream writer. As the name implied, Muramatsu is a great fan of professional wrestling, and has written a number of novels with wrestling as a theme. His Semi-finaru ("Semi-Final") was nominated for the prestigious Naoki Prize.

In 1982, his novel Jidaiya no nyobo ("The Wife of Jidaiya") was awarded the Naoki Prize, and was later made into a movie.

In 1997, his novel Kamakura no Obasan ("Auntie of Kamakura") was awarded the Izumi Kyoka Prize.

After Muramatsu appeared on television commercials for Suntory whiskey, and his line of “One Finger – Two Fingers” became a popular phrase in Japanese bars.
