= Muramatsu Shigekiyo =

Japanese mathematician

Muramatsu Shigekiyo (村松 茂清; 1608 – 1695) was a Japanese mathematician and curator in the Edo period. He is known for being the first to calculate the volume of a sphere using very thin slices, and to use inscribed and circumscribed polygones to approximate the circumference of a circle, and hence π. And by using a 32768-gon, he calculated its perimeter as 3.141592648... He published his value of π to 22 decimal places in his 1663 book Sanso (Stack of mathematics), but only 8 were correct. Later, in 1681, Seki Takakazu used the same method with a 131072-gon, and got π correct to 11 decimal places.
