= Mori, Shizuoka =

Mori 森町
- Town
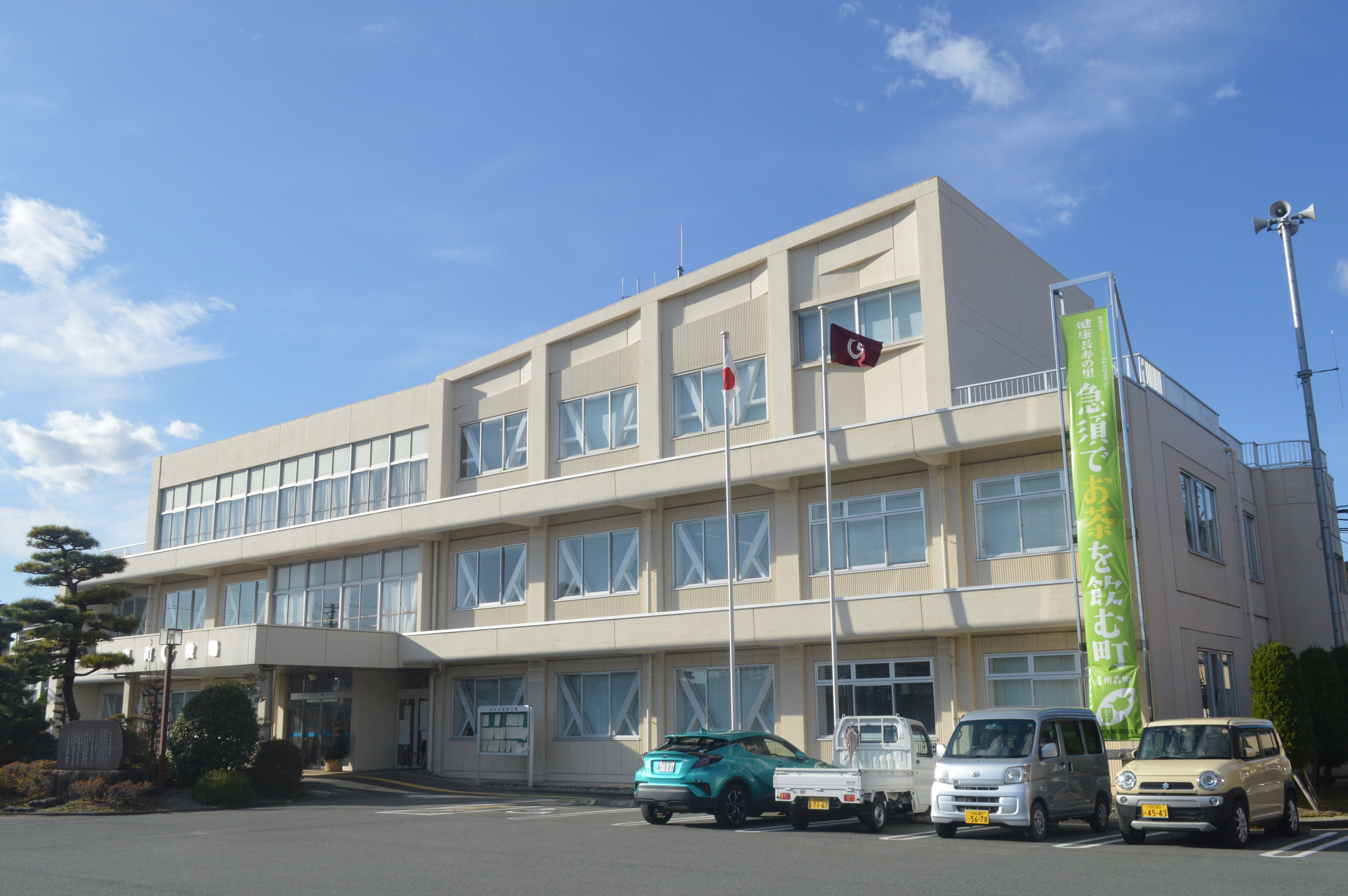
- Mori Town Hall

- Flag Seal

- Location of Mori in Shizuoka Prefecture

- Coordinates: 34°50′N 137°56′E
- Country: Japan
- Region: Chūbu; Tōkai
- Prefecture: Shizuoka
- District: Shūchi

Area
  - Total: 133.91 km^{2} (51.70 sq mi)

Population (August 1, 2019)
  - Total: 18,306
  - Density: 136.70/km^{2} (354.06/sq mi)
- Time zone: UTC+9 (Japan Standard Time)
- City symbols
  - Tree: Camellia sasanqua
  - Flower: Lily
  - Bird: Common kingfisher
- Phone number: 0538-85-2111
- Address: 2101-1 Mori, Mori-machi, Shūchi-gun, Shizuoka-ken 437-0293
- Website: Official website

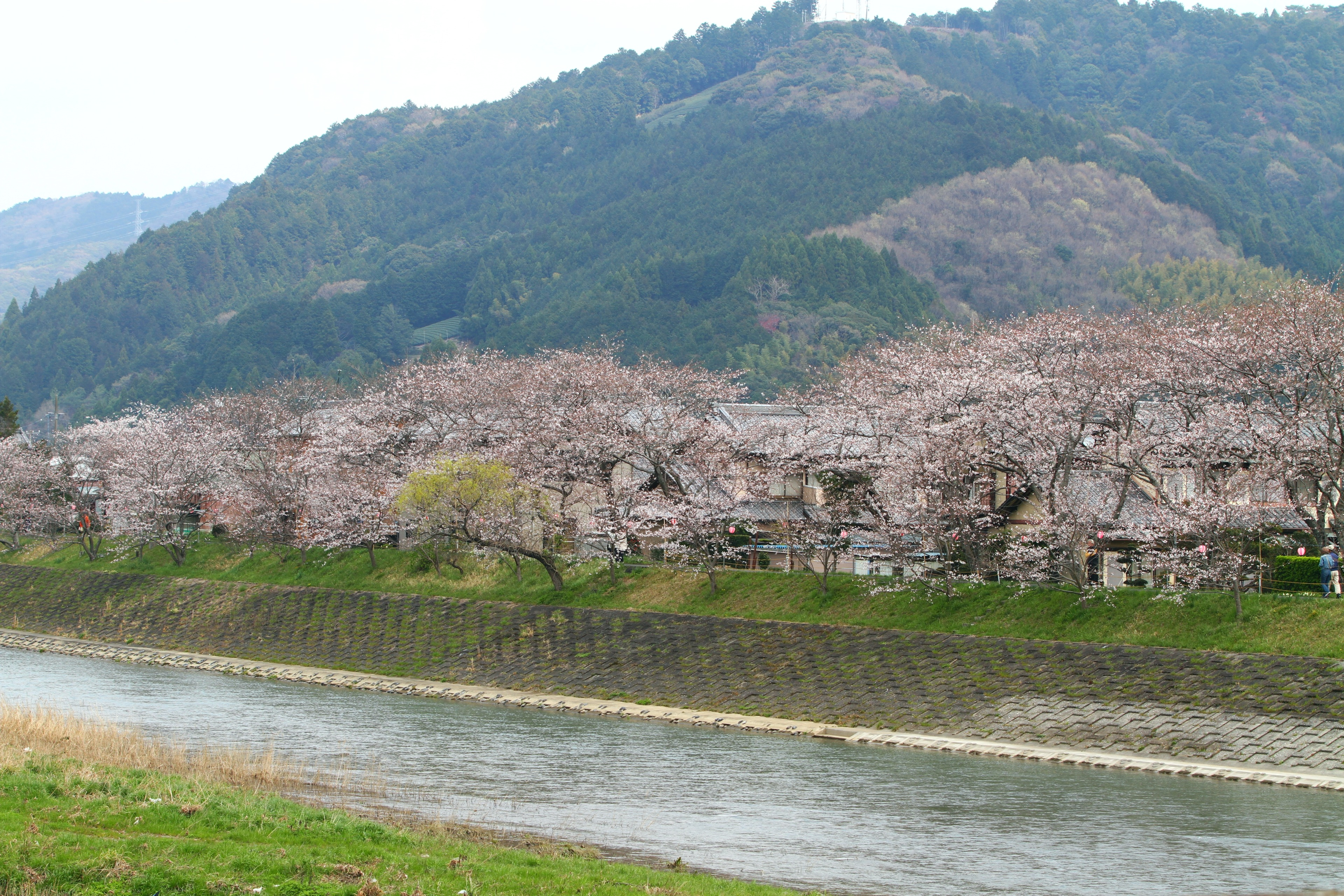
Panorama of Mori

Mori (森町, Mori-machi) is a town located in Shūchi District, Shizuoka Prefecture, Japan. As of 1 August 2019, the town had an estimated population of 18,306 in 6622 households, and a population density of 134 persons per km^{2}. The total area of the town was 133.91 square kilometres (51.70 sq mi).

== Geography ==
Mori is located in an inland area in the hills of western Shizuoka Prefecture. The town has a temperate maritime climate with very hot, humid summers and mild, cool winters, pleasant air.

== Neighboring municipalities ==
Shizuoka Prefecture

- Fukuroi
- Hamamatsu
- Iwata
- Kakegawa
- Shimada

== Demographics ==
Per Japanese census data, the population of Mori has been in slow decline over the past 30 years.

Historical population
Year	Pop.	±%
1960	25,244	—
1970	21,764	−13.8%
1980	20,447	−6.1%
1990	21,081	+3.1%
2000	20,689	−1.9%
2010	19,436	−6.1%

=== Climate ===
The city has a climate characterized by hot and humid summers, and relatively mild winters (Köppen climate classification Cfa). The average annual temperature in Mori is 15.9 °C. The average annual rainfall is 2083 mm with September as the wettest month. The temperatures are highest on average in August, at around 26.9 °C, and lowest in January, at around 5.4 °C.

== History ==
Mori has been known since the Kamakura period as the location of the Oguni Jinja, the ichinomiya of former Tōtōmi Province and a pilgrimage destination. In the Edo period it was largely tenryō territory under direct control of the Tokugawa shogunate.

With the establishment of the modern municipalities system in the early Meiji period in 1889, the area was reorganized into the town of Mori within Shūchi District, Shizuoka Prefecture. In 1955-56, the area of the town was expanded through annexation of five neighboring villages. Discussions to merge with neighboring Fukuroi were shelved after a referendum opposing the merger was held in 2009.

== Economy ==
The economy of Mori is mixed with industrial enterprise and agricultural enterprise. The main industries include automobile-related factories by Toyoda Gosei Co Ltd., and Yamaha Motor Company.

== Education ==
Mori has five public elementary schools and three public junior high school operated by the town government. The town has one public high school operated by the Shizuoka Prefectural Board of Education.

== Transportation ==
=== Railway ===
- Tenryū Hamanako Railroad Tenryū Hamanako Line
  - Towata - Enshū-Mori - Morimachibyōin-mae - Enden - Tōtōmi-Ichinomiya

=== Highway ===
- Shin-Tōmei Expressway

== Local attractions ==
- Okuni Jinja

== Noted people from Mori ==
- Fuyuko Matsui, Nihonga artist
- Muramatsu Shofu, writer
