= Okuni Shrine =

Shinto shrine in Shizuoka Prefecture, Japan

Okuni Jinja 小國神社
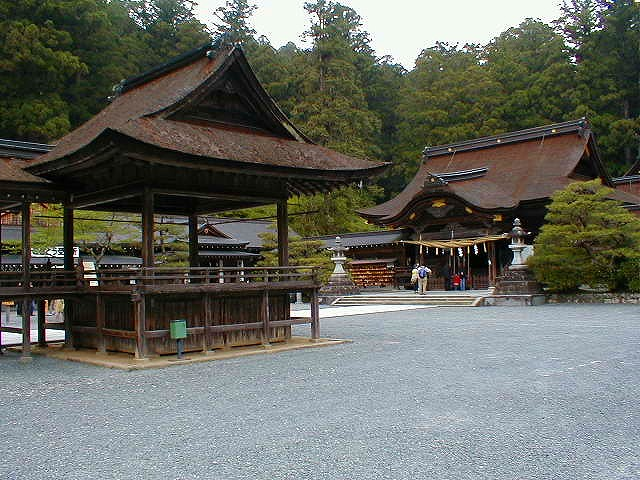
- Honden and Maidono of Okuni Jinja

- Okuni Jinja Okuni Shrine (Japan)

Religion
- Affiliation: Shinto
- Deity: Ōnamuchi-no-mikoto
- Festival: April 14

Location
- Location: 3956-1 Mori-machi, Shūchi-gun, Shizuoka-ken 437-0226
- Interactive map of Okuni Jinja 小國神社
- Coordinates: 34°50′51″N 137°53′57″E

Website
- www.okunijinja.or.jp

The Okuni Shrine (小國神社, Okuni jinja), is a Shinto shrine in the town of Mori, Shūchi District, Shizuoka Prefecture, Japan. It is one of the two shrines claiming the title of ichinomiya of former Tōtōmi Province. The main festival of the shrine is held annually on April 18.

== Enshrined kami ==
The kami enshrined at Okuni Jinja is:

- Ōnamuchi-no-mikoto (大己貴命), kami of nation-building, agriculture, medicine, and protective magic

== History ==
The date of Okuni Shrine's foundation is unknown. Shrine tradition gives a date of February 18, 555 (during the reign of Emperor Kinmei) as the date when a shrine was first constructed on the summit of six-kilometer distant 511-meter Mount Hongū, which now forms part of the shrine's grounds. The shrine only appears in historical records from an entry within the Shoku Nihon Kōki dated June 14, 884 and it is mentioned again in the Engishiki records, but is still listed as a "minor shrine". It has been styled the ichinomiya of Tōtōmi Province since at least 1235, and continued to be referred to as the “Ichinomiya” until the end of the Edo period. Due to the waning power of the Imperial Court, imperial messages ceased to be sent to the shrine from the Muromachi period. The shrine was destroyed when Takeda Shingen invaded Tōtōmi in 1572 and the shrine's priests sided with Tokugawa Ieyasu. It was rebuilt by Tokugawa Ieyasu in 1575, and subsequent generations of Tokugawa shōguns continued to support the shrine.

During the Meiji period era of State Shinto, the shrine was rated as a prefectural shrine in 1873, and was promoted to a National shrine, 3rd rank (国幣小社, kokuhei-shōsha) under the Modern system of ranked Shinto Shrines in 1874.

The shrine is located a 50-minute walk from Tōtōmi-Ichinomiya Station on the Tenryū Hamanako Railroad

== Events ==
The main festival of the shrine is held annually on April 18, during which time a set of twelve dances are performed. This performance is said to date to the early Heian period and is a National Intangible Cultural Property.

== Gallery ==
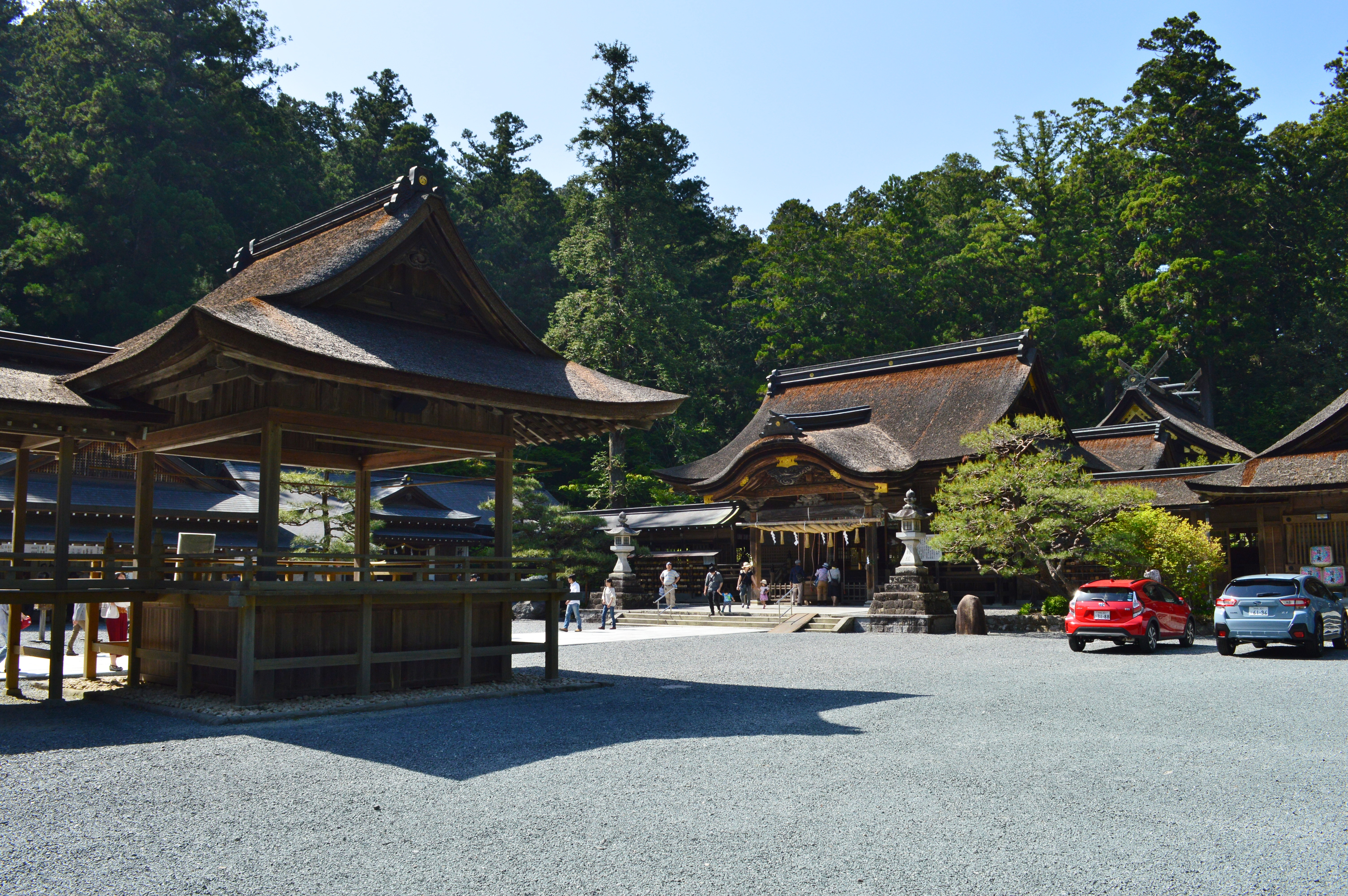
Shaden

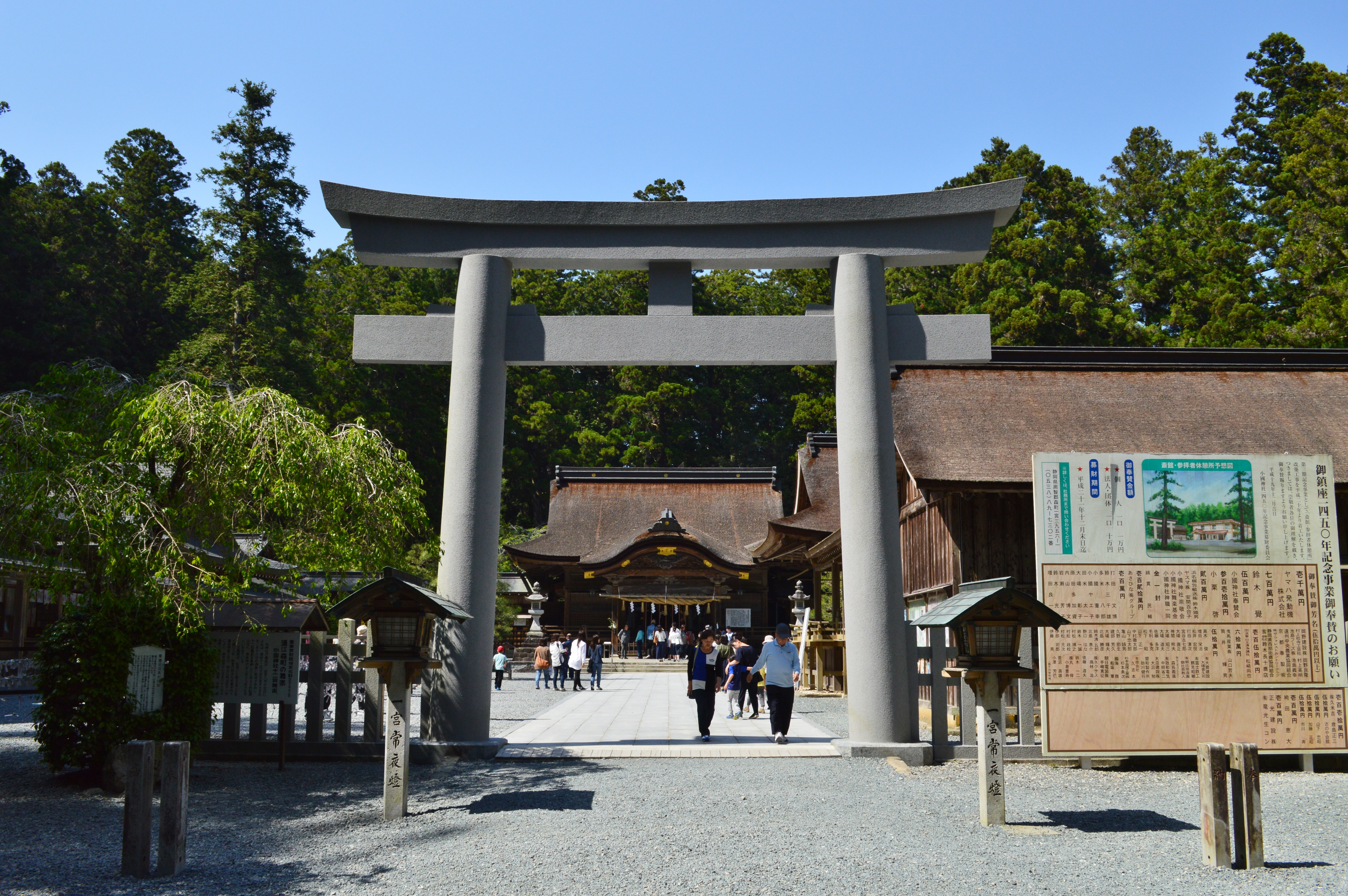
Torii in front of Shaden

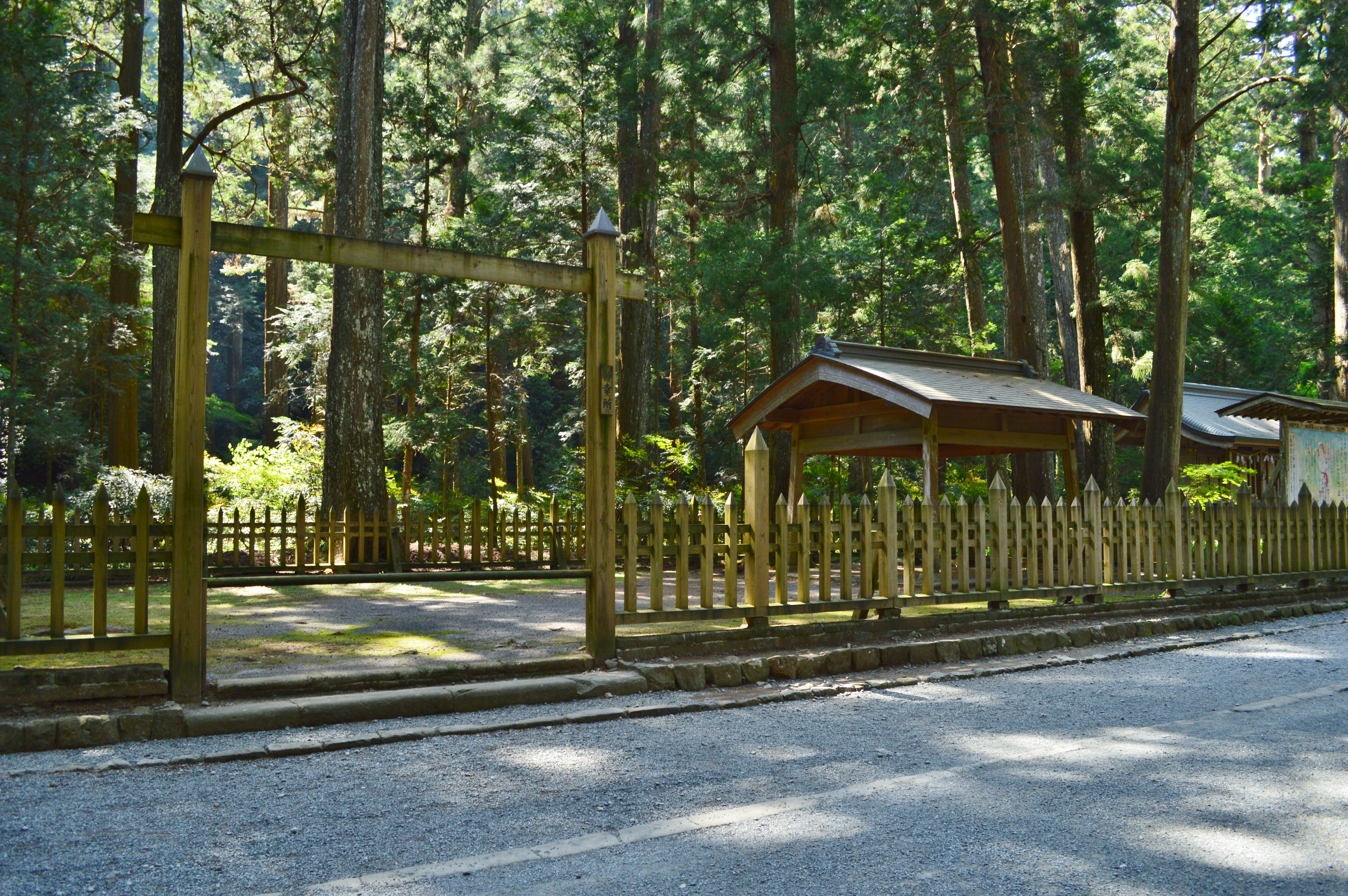
Shinko-sho

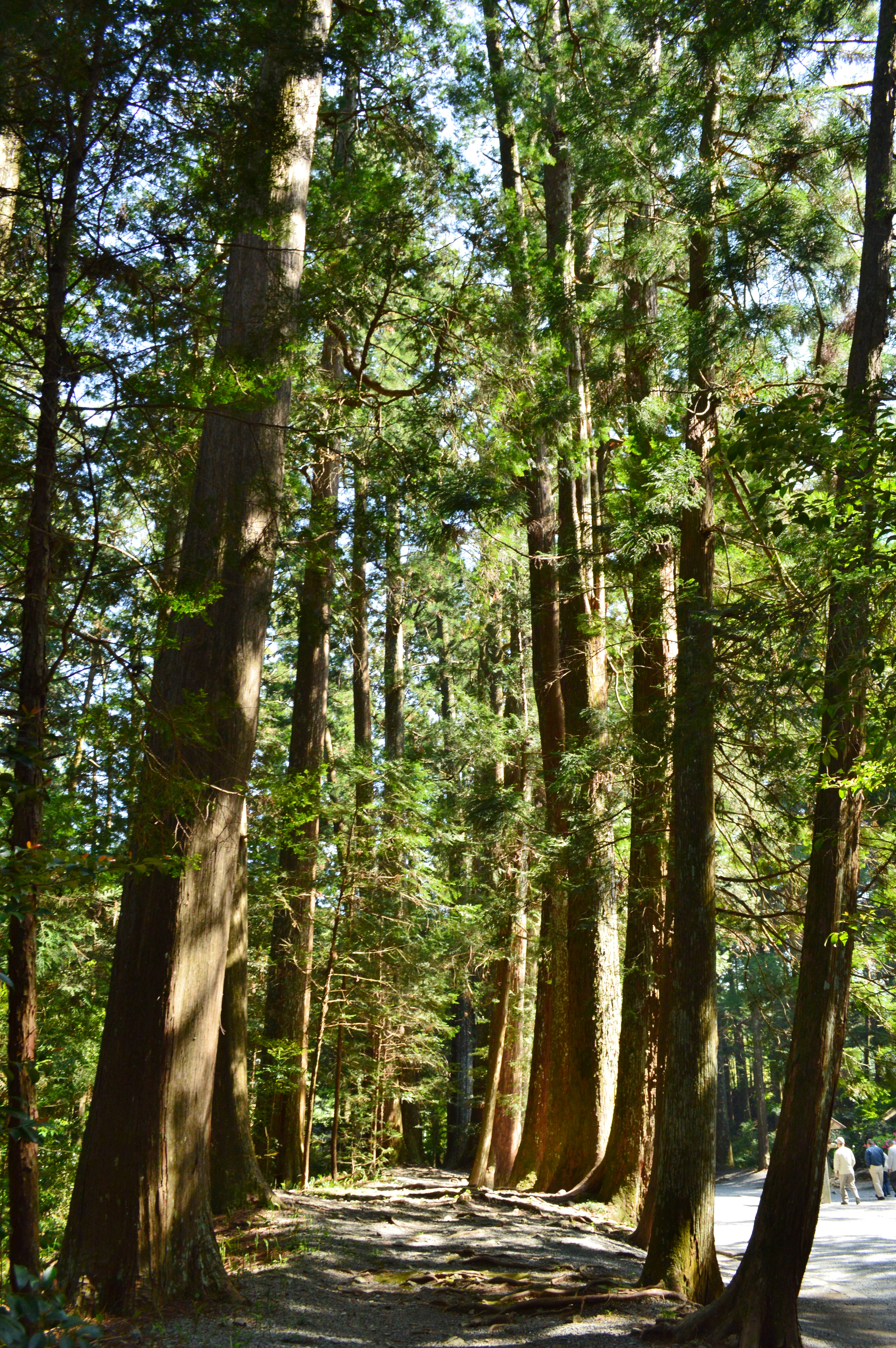
approach

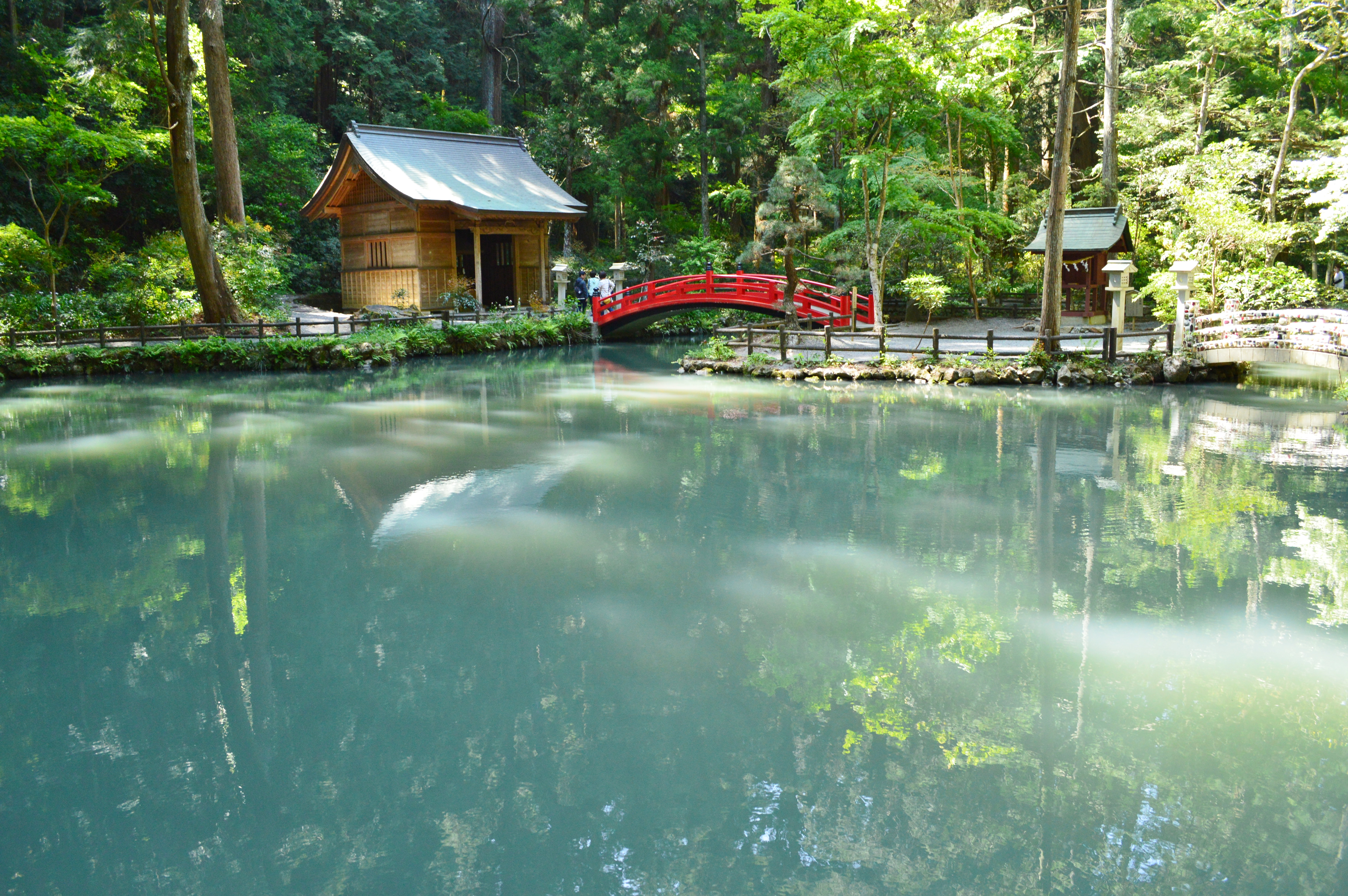
Kotomachi Pond

== Cultural properties ==
=== Important Intangible Cultural Folk Properties ===
- Totomi Mori-machi no Kagura (遠江森町の舞楽),

== See also ==
- List of Shinto shrines in Japan
- List of Important Intangible Folk Cultural Properties
- Ichinomiya
