= Yasuko Muramatsu =

Japanese feminist academic

- Born: 村松泰子; 1944 (age 81–82)

Academic background
- Education: University of Tokyo; Sophia University

Academic work
- Discipline: Economics, feminism
- Institutions: Faculty, Tokyo Woman's Christian University; Professor, president, Tokyo Gakugei University

Yasuko Muramatsu (Japanese: 村松泰子, born 1944) is a Japanese development economist, author and women's rights activist.

She was the president of Tokyo Gakugei University and is the president of Japan Women's Learning Foundation.

== Early life and education ==
Muramatsu was born in 1944. She graduated from the University of Tokyo's Faculty of Letters and has a PhD from the Sophia University Graduate School.

== Career ==
Muramatsu worked at the NHK Broadcasting Culture Research Institute from 1967 until 1991. She then worked at the Tokyo Woman's Christian University where she studied the economic status of women in Japan and was part of the steering committee on the Center for Women's Studies. She next worked as a professor at Tokyo Gakugei University where she became the president from April 2010 to March 2014. She delivered her final lecture Gender Studies in Media and Education on 27 February 2010.

In 2014, she remained as the president of Japan Women's Learning Foundation.

She is a member of the Japan-based International Group for the Study of Women and chaired the organisation's third International Symposium on Women in an Age of Science and Technology.

== Selected publications ==
- Gender Construction Through Interactions Between the Media and Audience in Japan, 2013, https://doi.org/10.1111/1475-6781.00018
