= Shōfū Muramatsu =

Japanese novelist

- 村松梢風
- Shōfū Muramatsu
- Born: 21 September 1889; Mori, Shizuoka, Japan
- Died: 13 February 1961 (aged 71); Kamakura, Kanagawa, Japan
- Resting place: Kakuon-ji, Kamakura
- Education: Keio University
- Occupation: Writer
- Writing career
- Genre: Novels

Giichi Muramatsu (村松 義一, Muramatsu Giichi; 21 September 1889 - 13 February 1961), known by his pen name Shōfū Muramatsu (村松梢風, Muramatsu Shōfū), was a Japanese novelist active during the Shōwa era of Japan.

== Early life ==
Muramatsu was born in what is now part of the town of Mori, in Shizuoka prefecture, which was (and is) a rural district. Unhappy with country life, he moved to Shiba in Tokyo and attended Keio University Faculty of Arts. While there, he spent more of his time in the Tokyo pleasure districts, such as Yoshiwara, rather than in the classroom. Kotohime monogatari, his first novel, was based on personal experiences in the brothel district, and it appeared in the literary magazine Chūōkōron in 1917. Its success led to his withdrawal from Keio University to start a career as a writer.

== Literary career ==
In 1923, Muramatsu moved to China, where he lived in the Shanghai International Settlement in an apartment run by émigré Russians. He was interested in Chinese culture, but while in Shanghai, he was exposed to many varieties of Western culture as a result of large numbers of French, British and Russian expatriates in the neighborhood. He also made the acquaintance of a number of young Chinese intellectuals, including Tian Han, Yu Dafu and Guo Moruo. In his 1924 novel Mato (“Demon City”, 1924), he portrayed the dichotomy of Shanghai – a modern, beautiful, civilized façade, hiding a darker side populated by all manner of criminals and vice.

Muramatsu remained in China for several years, and was especially close to Guo Moruo, assisting him while in exile in Japan in 1928; however, the friendship was severed when Japan sent troops into China in response to the Jinan Incident.

Although Muramatsu produced numerous works of romantic popular fiction, he is best known for his semi-historical biographical novels. His works include Shōden Shimizu Jirochō (1926–1928), about the famous 19th century gangster/folk-hero of the Tōkaidō. He also wrote several spy novels in the 1930s, glorifying the exploits of Yoshiko Kawashima in Manchuria. Some of the exaggerated fictional exploits created by Muramatsu were cited as “evidence” in Kawashima’s post-war trial, which led to her execution.

Muramatsu also wrote Honchō gajin den (“Biography of an Imperial Court Painter”, 1940–1943), Kinsei Meishōden (“Biography of Contemporary Master Craftsmen”), and Kinsei meishōbu monogatari (1952–1961), which appeared serialized in newspapers.

A number of novels were made into movies in the early 1960s, such as Zangiku Monogatari, which was adapted as the movies (The Story of the Last Chrysanthemums in 1939 and Zangiku monogatari in 1956).

Muramatsu moved from Tokyo to Kamakura in 1947 and lived there with his mistress to his death. Muramatsu was a noted amateur master of the classical board game go. He was also a cat lover, a passion which he shared with fellow author and Kamakura resident Jirō Osaragi. Muramatsu died in 1961, and his grave is at the temple of Kakuon-ji in Kamakura. His son Muramatsu Takashi,won the Kikuchi Award, and his grandson Muramatsu Tomomi is a winner of the Naoki Award.

== See also ==
- Japanese literature
- List of Japanese authors
