= Keita Muramatsu =

- Born: India
- Occupations: President and CEO at HMSI

Keita Muramatsu is the president and CEO, Honda Motorcycle and Scooter India (HMSI).

== Early years ==
Keita was the general manager of Honda Motor Company - Motorsport Division Japan, before moving to India. In Japan, Keita was managing Honda performance in car rallies and water sports.

== HMSI ==
HMSI started after the split of the joint venture between Hero Group of Munjal's India and Honda in 2010. Keita was appointed as the president and CEO of HMSI and moved to India in 2010.

== Awards ==
- Forbes Leadership Awards - Best CEO MNC 2014

== Interests ==
Keita is also a drum player.
