= 1959 =

1959 in various calendars
- Gregorian calendar: 1959; MCMLIX
- Ab urbe condita: 2712
- Armenian calendar: 1408; ԹՎ ՌՆԸ
- Assyrian calendar: 6709
- Baháʼí calendar: 115–116
- Balinese saka calendar: 1880–1881
- Bengali calendar: 1365–1366
- Berber calendar: 2909
- British Regnal year: 7 Eliz. 2 – 8 Eliz. 2
- Buddhist calendar: 2503
- Burmese calendar: 1321
- Byzantine calendar: 7467–7468
- Chinese calendar: 戊戌年 (Earth Dog); 4656 or 4449 — to — 己亥年 (Earth Pig); 4657 or 4450
- Coptic calendar: 1675–1676
- Discordian calendar: 3125
- Ethiopian calendar: 1951–1952
- Hebrew calendar: 5719–5720
- Hindu calendars
- Vikram Samvat: 2015–2016
- Shaka Samvat: 1880–1881
- Kali Yuga: 5059–5060
- Holocene calendar: 11959
- Igbo calendar: 959–960
- Iranian calendar: 1337–1338
- Islamic calendar: 1378–1379
- Japanese calendar: Shōwa 34 (昭和３４年)
- Javanese calendar: 1890–1891
- Juche calendar: 48
- Julian calendar: Gregorian minus 13 days
- Korean calendar: 4292
- Minguo calendar: ROC 48 民國48年
- Nanakshahi calendar: 491
- Thai solar calendar: 2502
- Tibetan calendar: ས་ཕོ་ཁྱི་ལོ་ (male Earth-Dog); 2085 or 1704 or 932 — to — ས་མོ་ཕག་ལོ་ (female Earth-Boar); 2086 or 1705 or 933

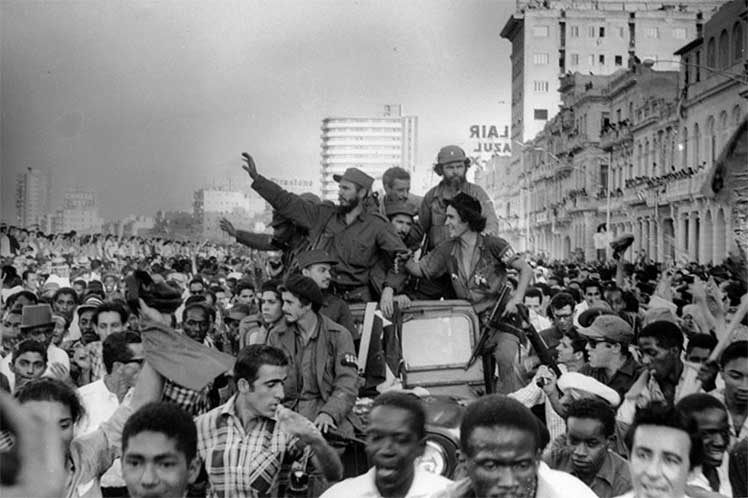
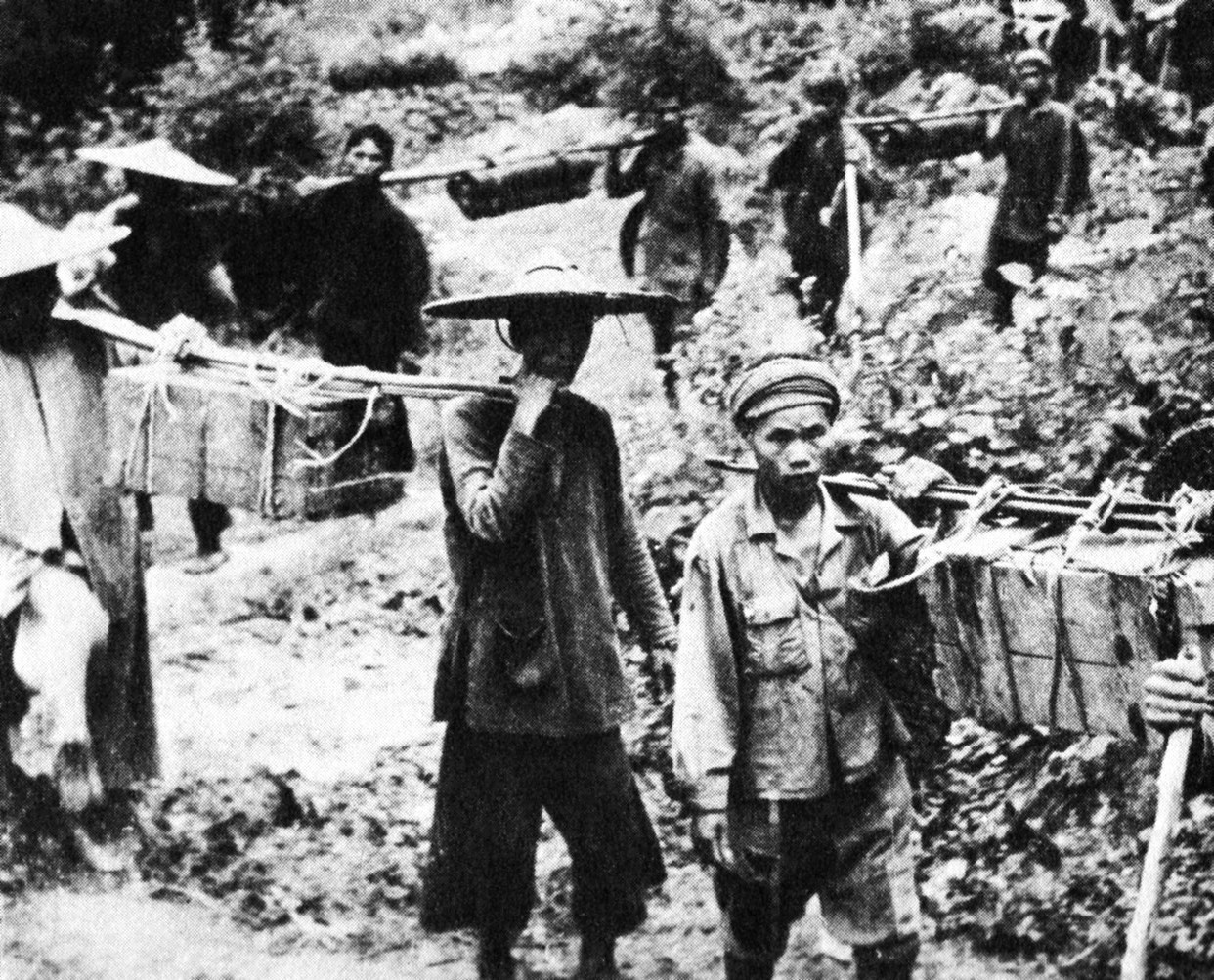
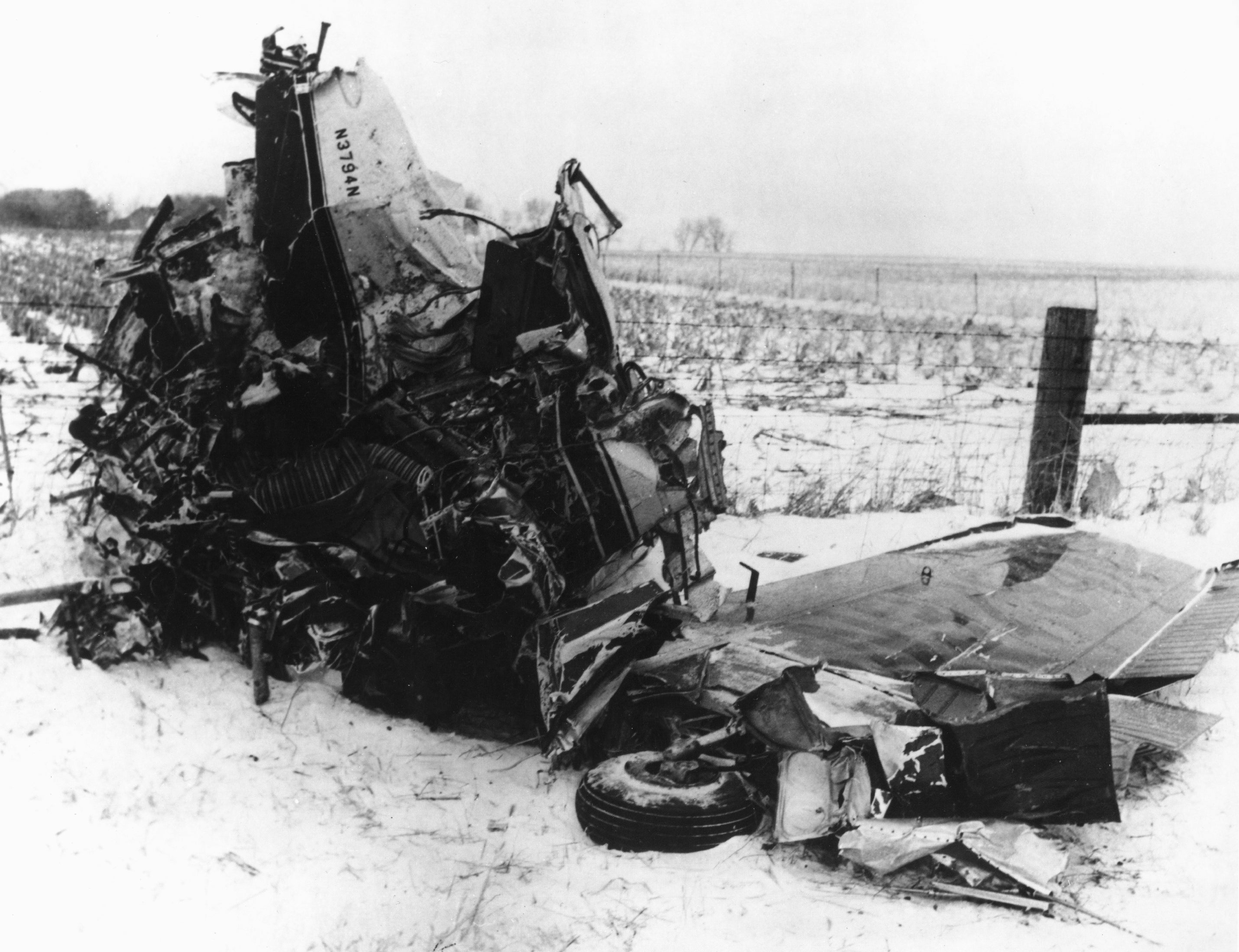
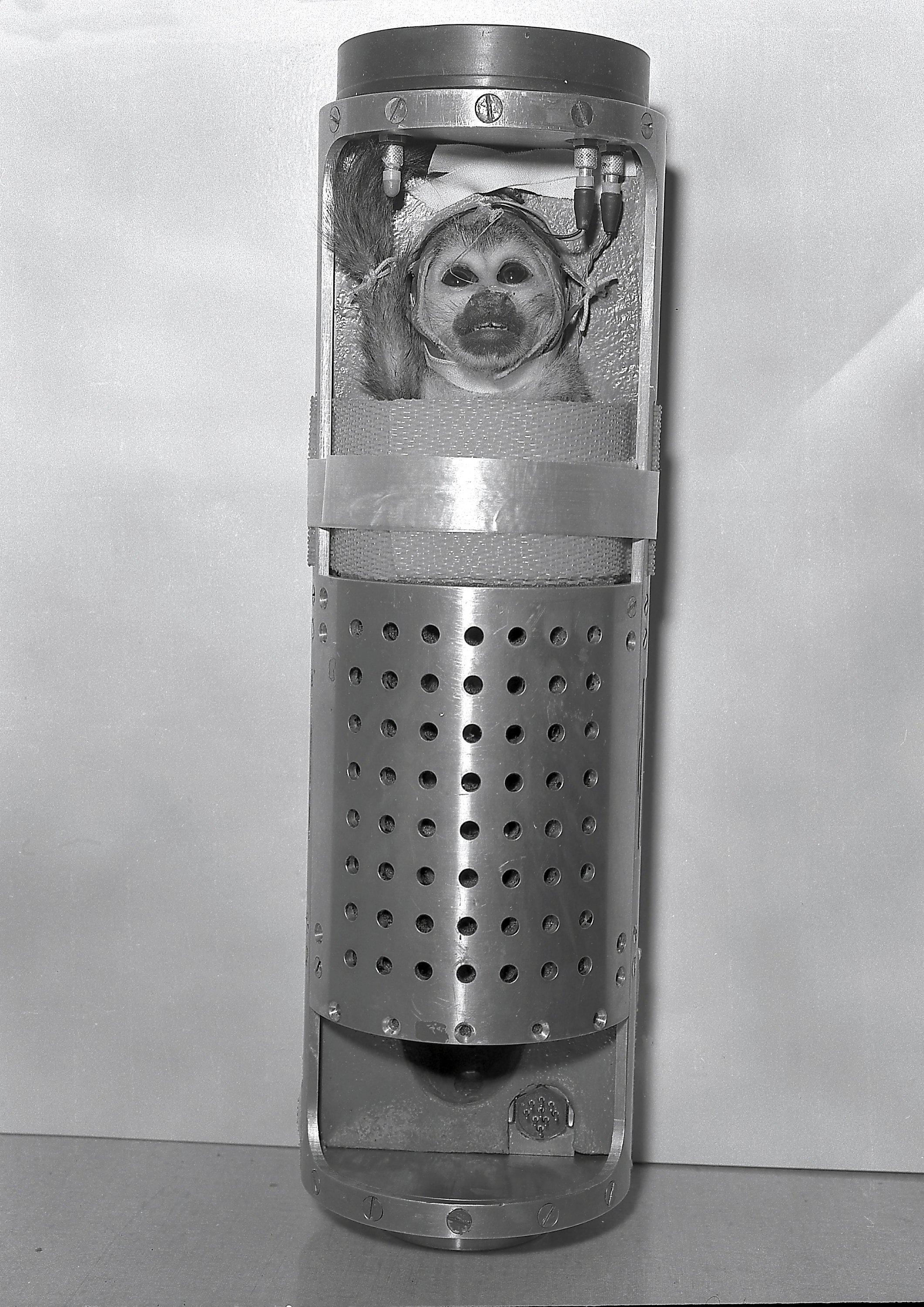
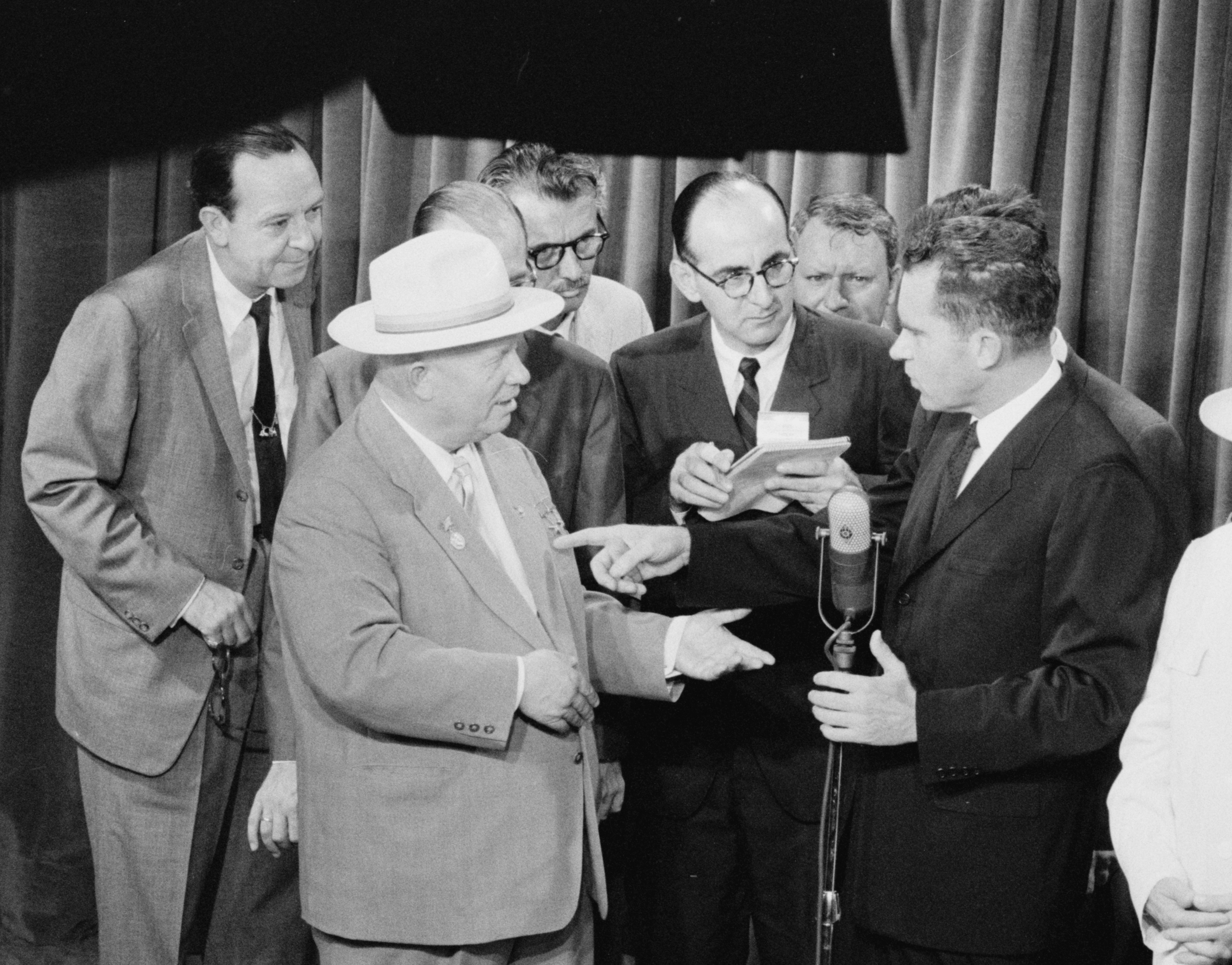
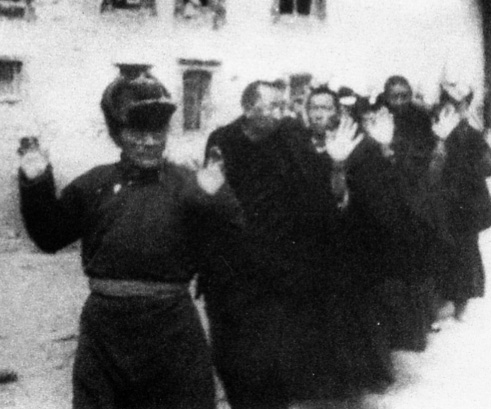
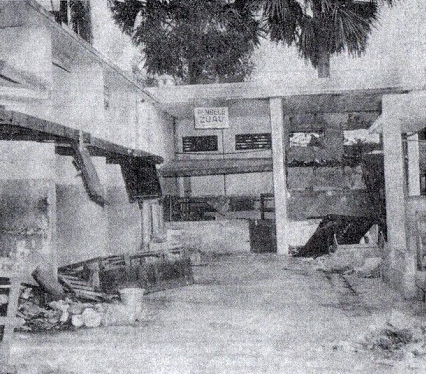
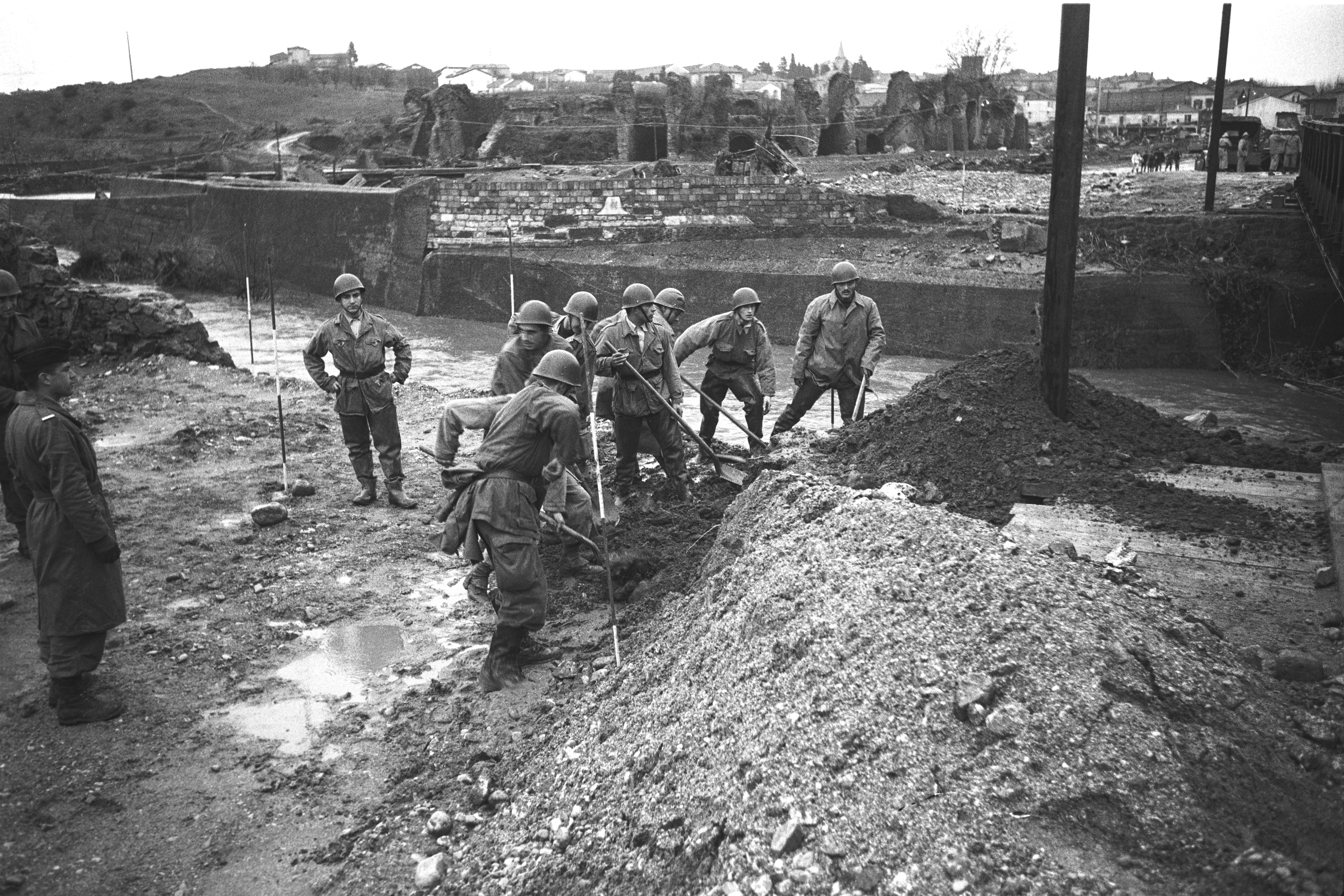
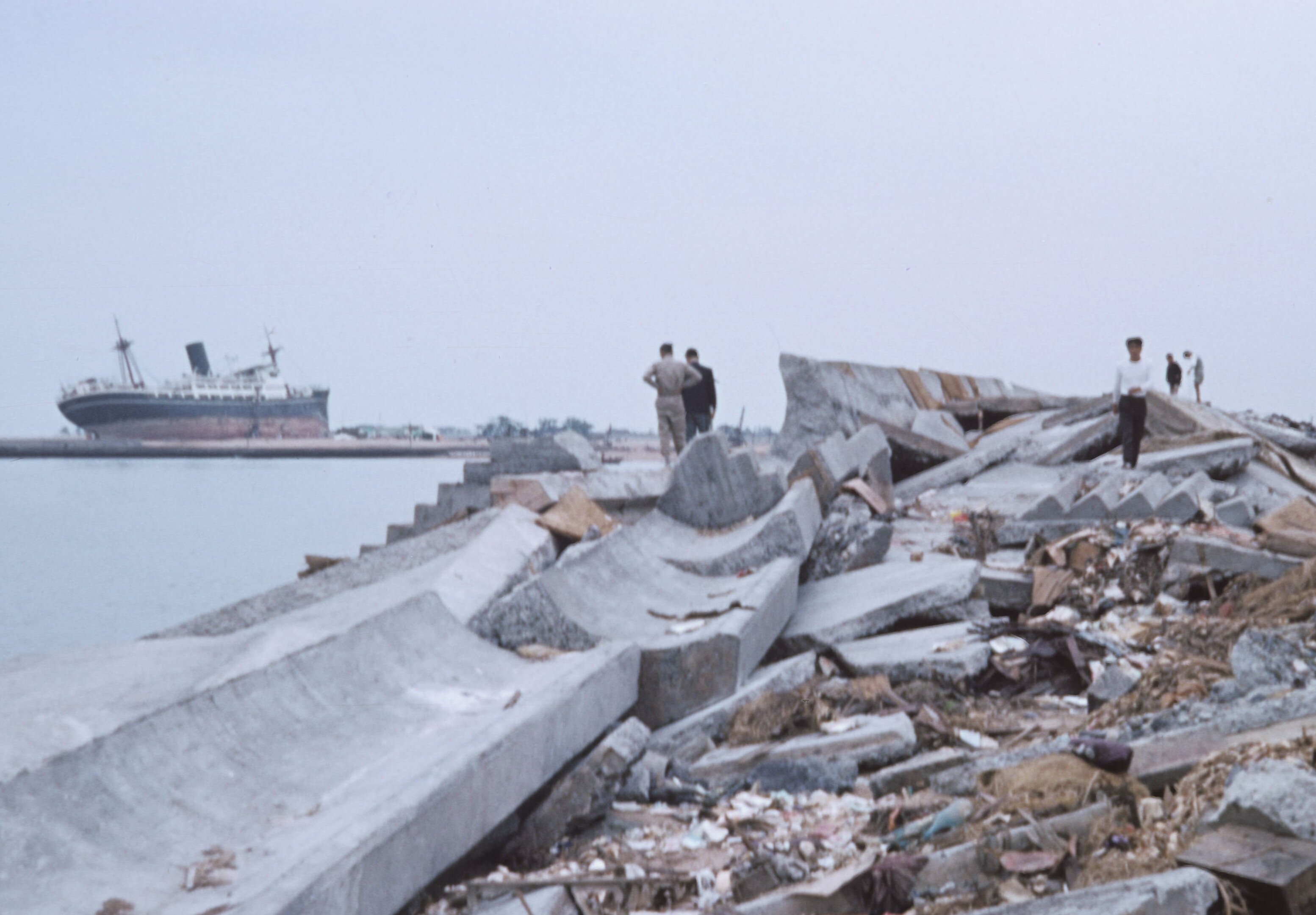
From top to bottom, left to right: The Cuban Revolution brings Fidel Castro to power after toppling Fulgencio Batista; construction of the Ho Chi Minh Trail begins, later crucial in the Vietnam War; The Day the Music Died plane crash kills Buddy Holly, Ritchie Valens, and J.P. "The Big Bopper" Richardson; Miss Baker becomes one of the first animals to survive spaceflight; the Kitchen Debate reflect Cold War tensions between Richard Nixon and Nikita Khrushchev; the 1959 Tibetan uprising forces the 14th Dalai Lama into exile; the Léopoldville riots ignite unrest in the Congo; the Malpasset Dam collapse kills hundreds in France; and Typhoon Vera devastates Japan.

1959 (MCMLIX) was a common year starting on Thursday of the Gregorian calendar, the 1959th year of the Common Era (CE) and Anno Domini (AD) designations, the 959th year of the 2nd millennium, the 59th year of the 20th century, and the 10th and last year of the 1950s decade.

== Events ==
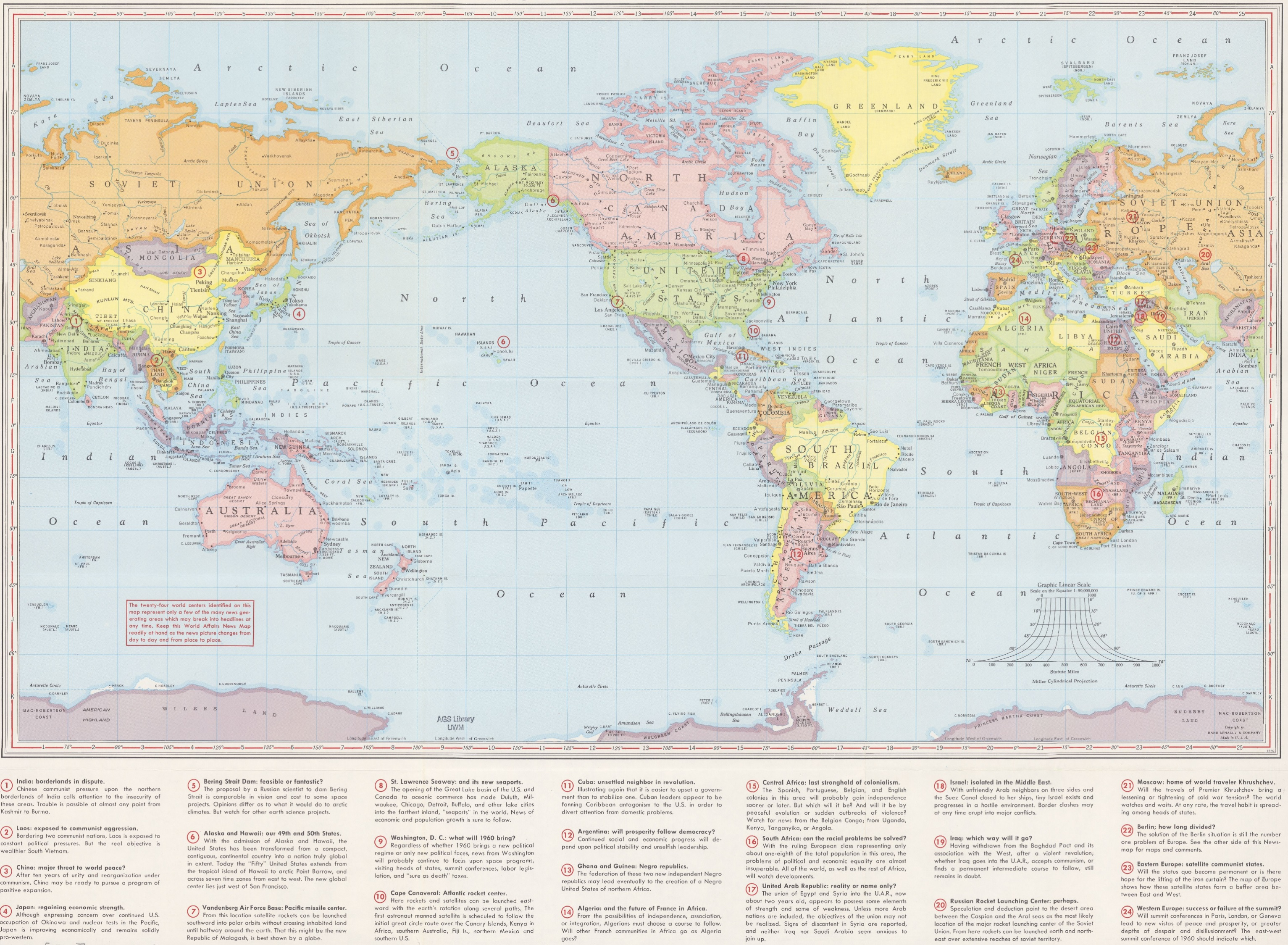
Map of the world in 1959, highlighting the main world affairs of the year

=== January ===
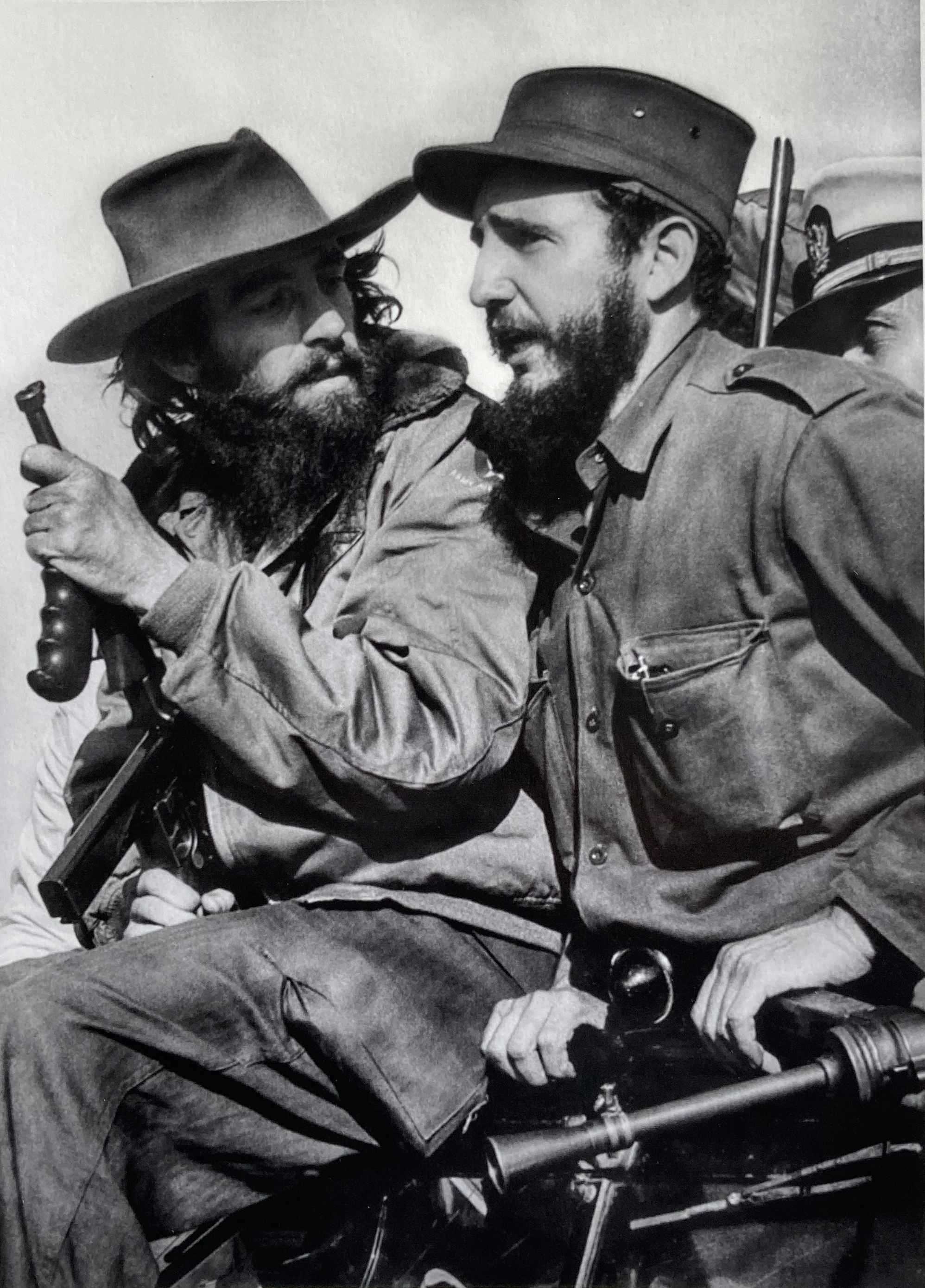
January 8: Fidel Castro arrives in Havana

- January 1 – Cuba: Fulgencio Batista flees Havana when the forces of Fidel Castro advance.
- January 2 – Soviet lunar probe Luna 1 is the first human-made object to attain escape velocity from Earth. It reaches the vicinity of Earth's Moon, where it was intended to crash-land, but instead becomes the first spacecraft to go into heliocentric orbit.
- January 3
  - Alaska is admitted as the 49th U.S. state.
  - The southernmost island of the Maldives archipelago, Addu Atoll, declares its independence from the Kingdom of the Maldives, initiating the United Suvadive Republic.
- January 4
  - In Cuba, rebel troops led by Che Guevara and Camilo Cienfuegos enter the city of Havana.
  - Léopoldville riots: At least 49 people are killed during clashes between the police and participants of a meeting of the ABAKO Party in Léopoldville in the Belgian Congo.
- January 6 – The International Maritime Organization is inaugurated.
- January 7 – The United States recognizes the new Cuban government of Fidel Castro.
- January 8 – Charles de Gaulle is inaugurated as the first president of the French Fifth Republic.
- January 9 – The Vega de Tera disaster in Spain, a flood caused by a dam collapse, nearly destroys the town of Ribadelago and kills 144 residents.
- January 10 – The Soviet government recognizes the new Castro government of Cuba.
- January 11 – The Confédération Mondiale des Activités Subaquatiques is founded in Monaco.
- January 15 – The Soviet Union conducts its first census after World War II.
- January 21 – The European Court of Human Rights is established.
- January 22 – Knox Mine disaster: Water breaches the River Slope Mine in Port Griffith, near Pittston, Pennsylvania, United States; 12 miners are killed.
- January 25 – American Airlines begins the first U.S. domestic jet service with a Boeing 707 airliner flight between New York and Los Angeles.
- January 30 – Danish passenger/cargo ship MS Hans Hedtoft, returning to Copenhagen after its maiden voyage to Greenland, strikes an iceberg and sinks off the Greenland coast with the loss of all 95 on board.

=== February ===
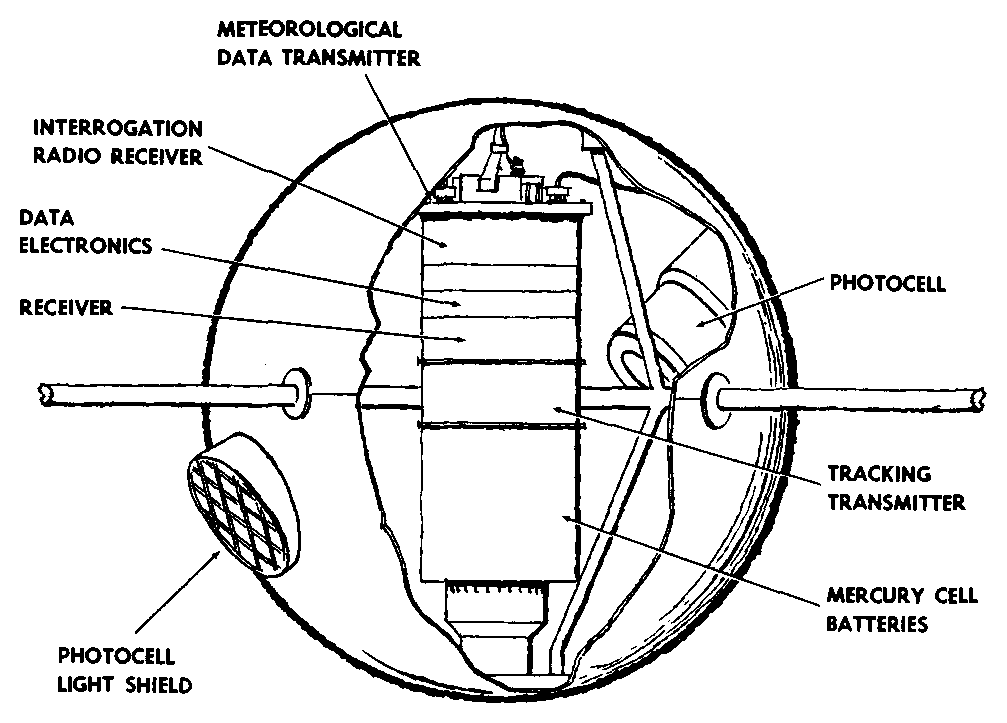
February 17: Technical drawing of Vanguard 2

- February 2 – Nine ski hikers mysteriously perish in the northern Ural Mountains in the Dyatlov Pass incident and are all found dead a few weeks later.
- February 3
  - A chartered plane transporting musicians Buddy Holly, Ritchie Valens and The Big Bopper with pilot Roger Peterson goes down in foggy conditions near Clear Lake, Iowa, killing all four on board. The tragedy is later termed "The Day the Music Died", popularized in Don McLean's 1971 song "American Pie".
  - American Airlines Flight 320, a Lockheed L-188 Electra from Chicago crashes into the East River on approach to New York City's LaGuardia Airport, killing 65 of the 73 people on board.
- February 6 – At Cape Canaveral, Florida, the first successful test firing of a Titan intercontinental ballistic missile is accomplished.
- February 9 – Yugoslavia and Spain set trade relations (not diplomatic ones).
- February 13 – TAT-2, AT&T's second transatlantic telephone cable goes into operation between Newfoundland and France.
- February 16 – Fidel Castro becomes Premier of Cuba.
- February 17 – Vanguard 2, the first weather satellite, is launched to measure cloud cover for the United States Navy.
- February 19 – First of the London and Zürich Agreements under which the United Kingdom agrees to grant independence to Cyprus.
- February 20 – The Canadian Government cancels the Avro Canada CF-105 Arrow interceptor aircraft project.

=== March ===
- March 1
  - The USS Tuscaloosa, USS New Orleans, USS Tennessee and USS West Virginia are stricken from the United States Naval Vessel Register.
  - Archbishop Makarios returns to Cyprus from exile.
- March 3 – Lunar probe Pioneer 4 becomes the first American object to escape dominance by Earth's gravity.
- March 9 – Mattel's Barbie doll debuts in the United States.
- March 10 – The Tibetan uprising erupts in Lhasa when Chinese officials attempt to arrest the Dalai Lama.
- March 11 – The Eurovision Song Contest 1959, staged in Cannes, is won for the Netherlands by "'n Beetje" sung by Teddy Scholten (music by Dick Schallies, lyrics by Willy van Hemert).
- March 17 – Tenzin Gyatso, 14th Dalai Lama escapes Tibet and arrives in India.
- March 18 – U.S. President Dwight D. Eisenhower signs the Hawaii Admission Act, granting statehood to Hawaii.
- March 19 – The other two southern islands of the Maldives, Huvadhu Atoll and Fuvahmulah, join Addu Atoll in forming the United Suvadive Republic (abolished September 1963).
- March 28 – The Kashag, the government of Tibet, is abolished by an order signed by Chinese premier Zhou Enlai. The Dalai Lama is replaced in China by the Panchen Lama.
- March 31 – The Dalai Lama is granted asylum in India.

=== April ===
- April 6 – The 31st Academy Awards ceremony is held in Hollywood. Musical film Gigi receives a record 9 Oscars.
- April 9 – NASA announces its selection of seven military pilots to become the first U.S. astronauts, later known as the 'Mercury Seven'.
- April 10 – Crown Prince Akihito of Japan marries Shōda Michiko, the first commoner to marry into the Imperial House of Japan.
- April 25 – The Saint Lawrence Seaway linking the Great Lakes and the Atlantic Ocean officially opens to shipping.
- April 27 – National People's Congress elects Liu Shaoqi as Chairman of the People's Republic of China, as a successor of Mao Zedong.

=== May ===
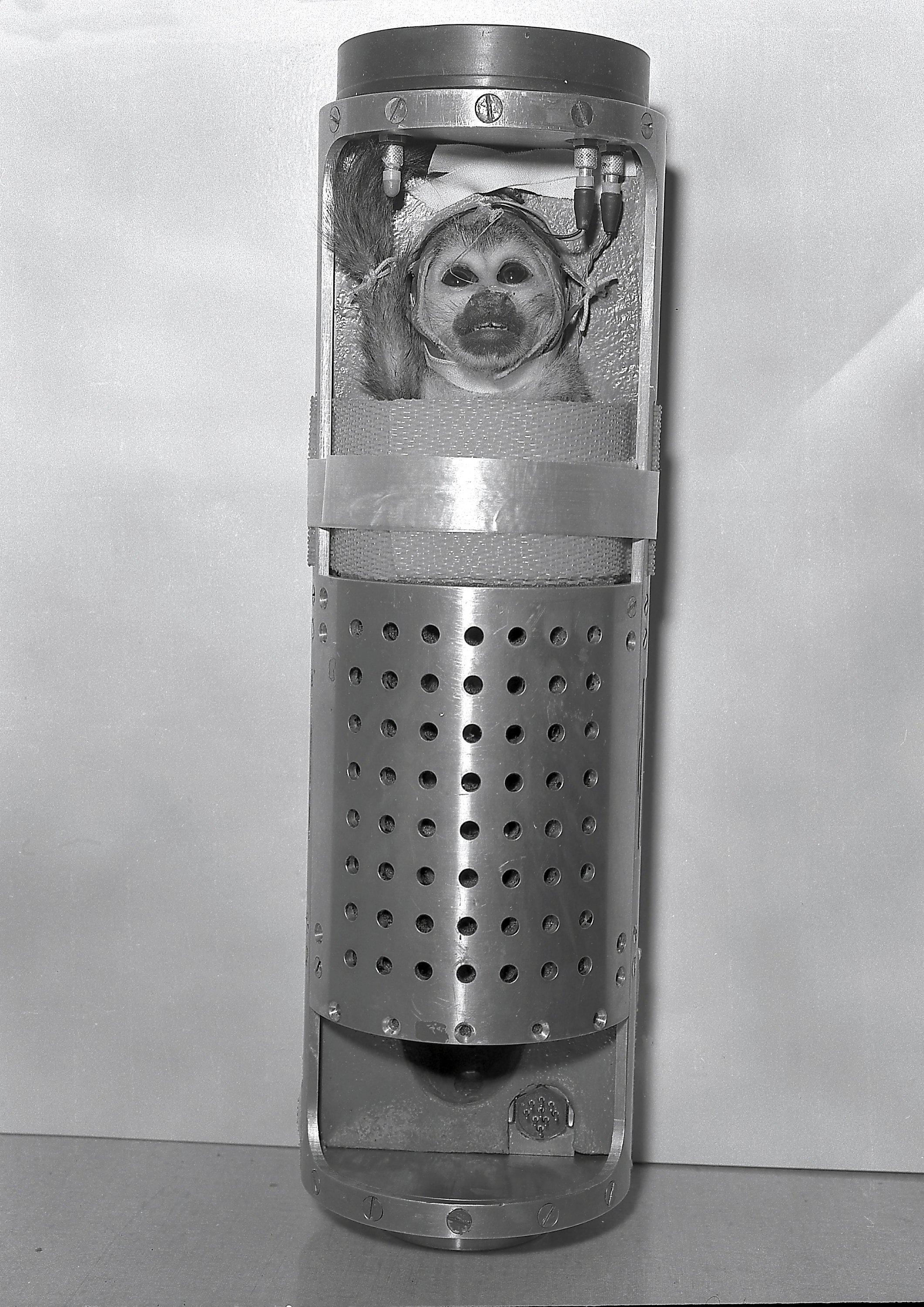
May 28: Miss Baker awaits launch.

- May 2 – 1959 FA Cup Final: Nottingham Forest defeat Luton Town 2–1 at Wembley Stadium.
- May 18 – The National Liberation Committee of Côte d'Ivoire is launched in Conakry, Guinea.
- May 23 – In Laos the Laotian Civil War begins between the Kingdom of Laos and communist rebels, the Pathet Lao.
- May 24 – British Empire Day is renamed Commonwealth Day.
- May 28 – Jupiter AM-18 rocket launches two primates, Miss Baker and Miss Able, into space from Cape Canaveral in the United States along with living microorganisms and plant seeds. Successful recovery makes them the first living beings to return safely to Earth after space flight.

=== June ===
- June 3 – Singapore becomes a self-governing crown colony of Britain with Lee Kuan Yew as Prime Minister.
- June 5 – A new government of the State of Singapore is sworn in by Sir William Goode. Two former ministers are re-elected to the Legislative Assembly.
- June 8 – The USS Barbero and United States Postal Service attempt the delivery of mail via Missile Mail.
- June 9 – The USS George Washington is launched as the first submarine to carry ballistic missiles.
- June 14 – A 3-front invasion of the Dominican Republic by exile forces backed by Fidel Castro and Venezuela attempts to overthrow Rafael Trujillo.
- June 23
  - Seán Lemass becomes the third Taoiseach of Ireland.
  - Convicted Manhattan Project spy Klaus Fuchs is released after nine years in a British prison and allowed to emigrate to Dresden, East Germany, where he resumes a scientific career.
- June 26 – Elizabeth II (as monarch of Canada) and United States President Dwight D. Eisenhower open the Saint Lawrence Seaway.
- June 30 – 1959 Okinawa F-100 crash: Twenty-one students are killed and more than a hundred injured when a U.S. Air Force North American F-100 Super Sabre jet crashes into Miamori Elementary School on the Japanese island of Okinawa. The pilot ejected before the plane struck the school.

=== July ===
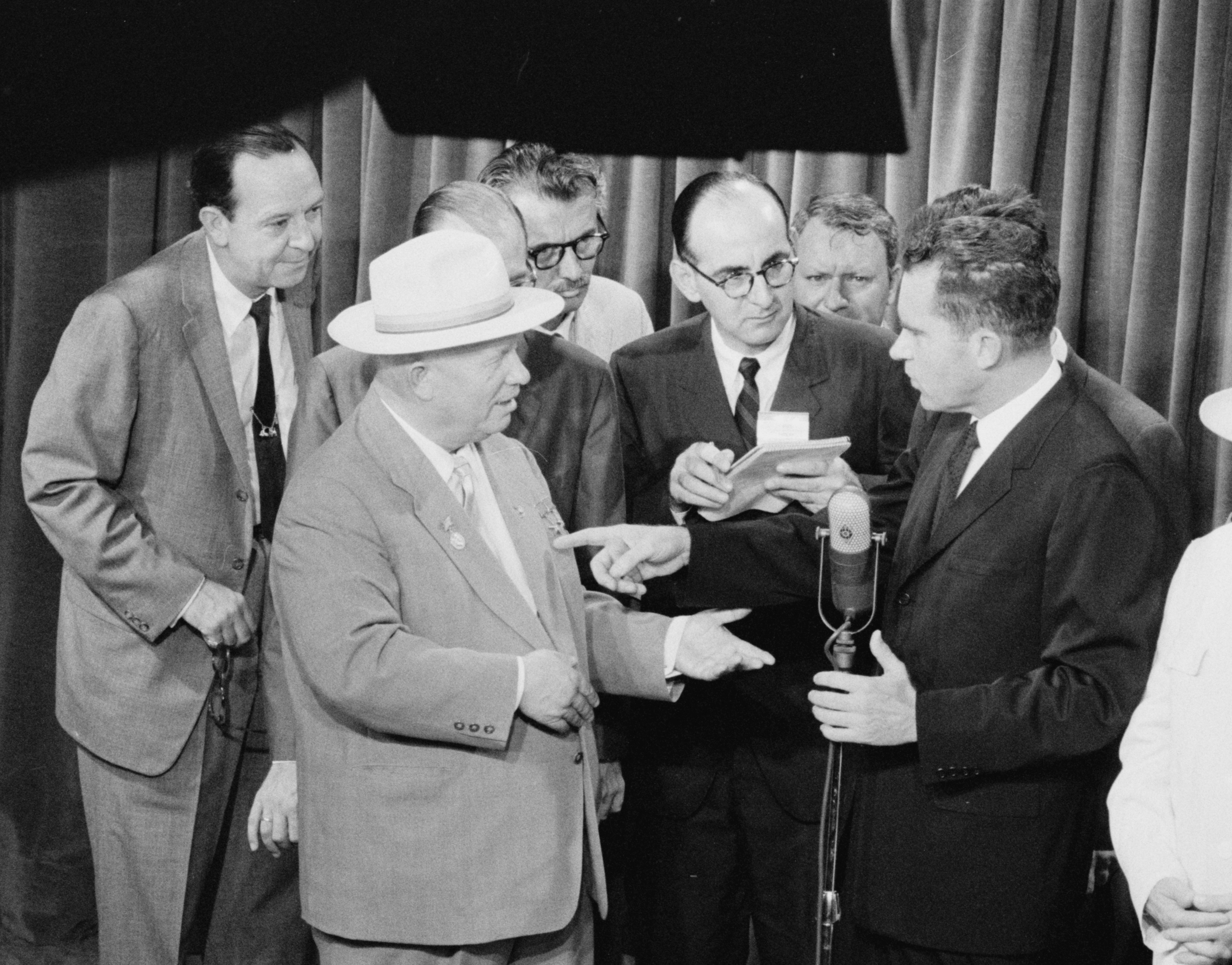
July 24: Soviet Premier Nikita Khrushchev and USA Vice President Richard Nixon engage in the Kitchen Debate

- July 2 – Prince Albert of Belgium marries Italian Donna Paola Ruffo di Calabria.
- July 4 – With the admission of Alaska as the 49th U.S. state earlier in the year, the 49-star flag of the United States makes its first appearance, in Philadelphia.
- July 7 – At 14:28 UT Venus occults the star Regulus. The rare event (which will next occur on October 1, 2044) is used to determine the diameter of Venus and the structure of Venus' atmosphere.
- July 9 – Wing Commander Michael Beetham flying a British Royal Air Force Vickers Valiant sets a record of 11 hours 27 minutes for a non-stop London-Cape Town flight.
- July 14 – Groups of Kurdish and communist militias rebel in Kirkuk, Iraq against the central government.
- July 17 – The first skull of Australopithecus is discovered by Louis Leakey and his wife Mary in the Olduvai Gorge of Tanzania.
- July 22 – A Kumamoto University medical research group studying Minamata disease concludes that it is caused by mercury.
- July 24 – At the opening of the American National Exhibition in Moscow, United States Vice President Richard Nixon and USSR Premier Nikita Khrushchev engage in the "Kitchen Debate".
- July 25 – The British SR.N1 hovercraft crosses the English Channel from Calais to Dover in just over 2 hours, on the 50th anniversary of Louis Blériot's first crossing by heavier-than-air craft.

=== August ===
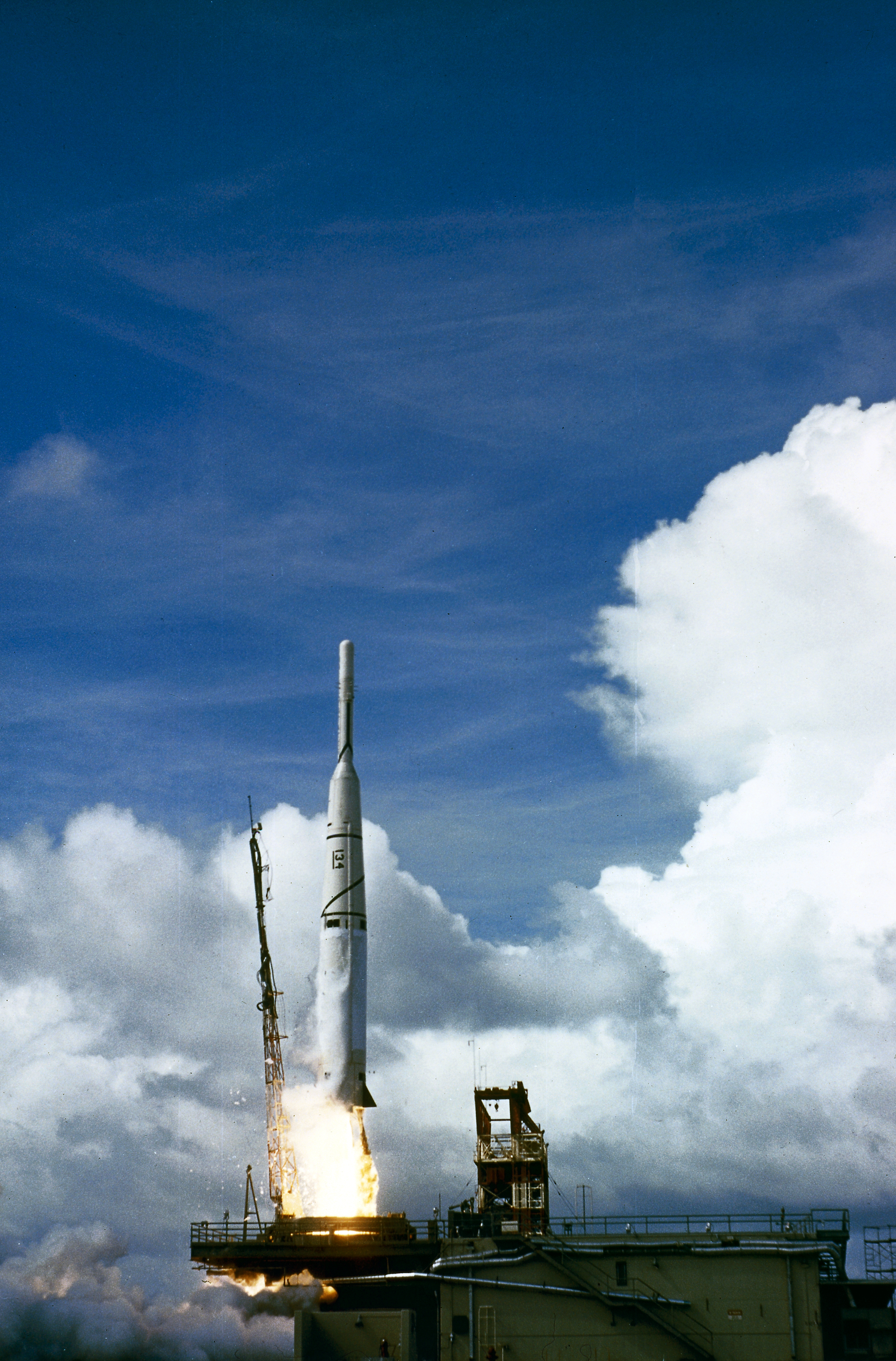
August 7: Launch of Explorer 6

- August 4 – Martial law is declared in Laos.
- August 7
  - Explorer program: The United States launches Explorer 6 from the Atlantic Missile Range in Cape Canaveral, Florida.
  - The Roseburg Blast in Oregon, caused when a truck carrying explosives catches fire, kills 14 and causes $12 million worth of damage.
- August 8 – A flood in Taiwan kills 2,000.
- August 14 – Explorer 6 sends the first picture of Earth from orbit.
- August 15 – Cyprus gains independence.
- August 17 – The 1959 Hebgen Lake earthquake in southwest Montana, United States, kills 28.
- August 19 – The Central Treaty Organization (CENTO) is established.
- August 21 – Hawaii is admitted as the 50th and last U.S. state.
- August 26 – The original Mini car, designed by Sir Alec Issigonis, is launched in England.
- August 30 – 1959 South Vietnamese legislative election: South Vietnamese opposition figure Phan Quang Dan is elected to the National Assembly despite soldiers being bussed in to vote for President Ngo Dinh Diem's candidate.
- August 31 – The Workers' Stadium sports venue in Beijing (China) is officially opened.

=== September ===
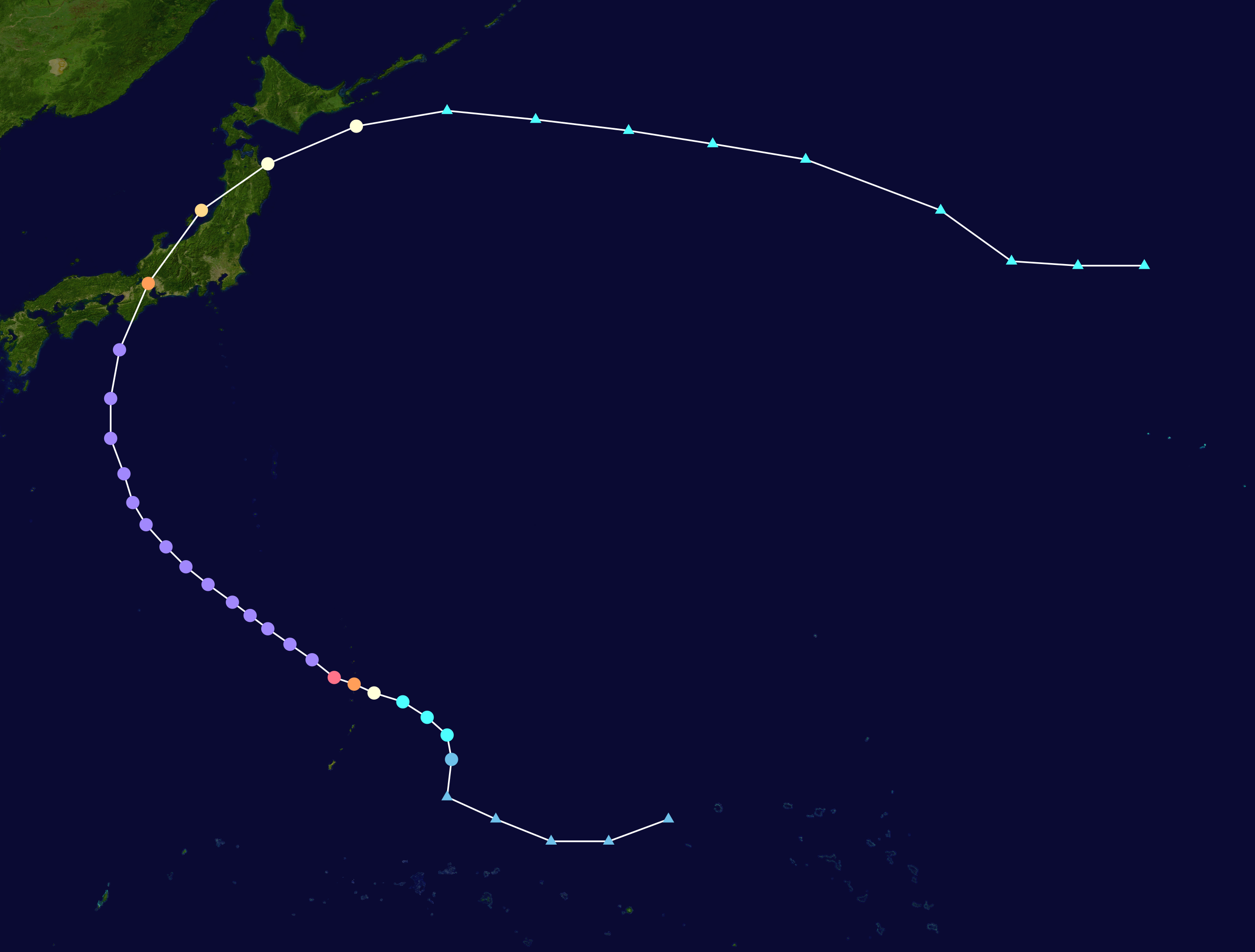
September 26: Typhoon Vera storm path Map key Saffir–Simpson scale Tropical depression (≤38 mph, ≤62 km/h) Tropical storm (39–73 mph, 63–118 km/h) Category 1 (74–95 mph, 119–153 km/h) Category 2 (96–110 mph, 154–177 km/h) Category 3 (111–129 mph, 178–208 km/h) Category 4 (130–156 mph, 209–251 km/h) Category 5 (≥157 mph, ≥252 km/h) Unknown Storm type Tropical cyclone Subtropical cyclone Extratropical cyclone, remnant low, tropical disturbance, or monsoon depression

- September 14 – Soviet spacecraft Luna 2 becomes the first human-made object to crash on the Moon.
- September 15–28 – USSR Premier Nikita Khrushchev and his wife tour the United States, at the invitation of U.S. President Dwight D. Eisenhower.
- September 16 – The Xerox 914, the first plain paper copier, is introduced to the public.
- September 17 – The hypersonic North American X-15 research aircraft, piloted by Scott Crossfield, makes its first powered flight at Edwards Air Force Base, California.
- September 23 – The MS Princess of Tasmania, Australia's first passenger roll-on/roll-off diesel ferry, makes her maiden voyage across the Bass Strait.
- September 26
  - Typhoon Vera hits central Honshū, Japan, as a 160 miles per hour (260 km/h) Category 5 storm, killing an estimated 5,098, injuring another 38,921, and leaving 1,533,000 homeless. Most of the victims and damage are centered in the Nagoya area.
  - First large unit action of the Vietnam War takes place, when two companies of the ARVN's 23rd Division are ambushed by a well-organized Viet Cong force of several hundred, identified as the "2nd Liberation Battalion".
- September 30 – Soviet Union leader Nikita Khrushchev meets Mao Zedong in Beijing.

=== October ===
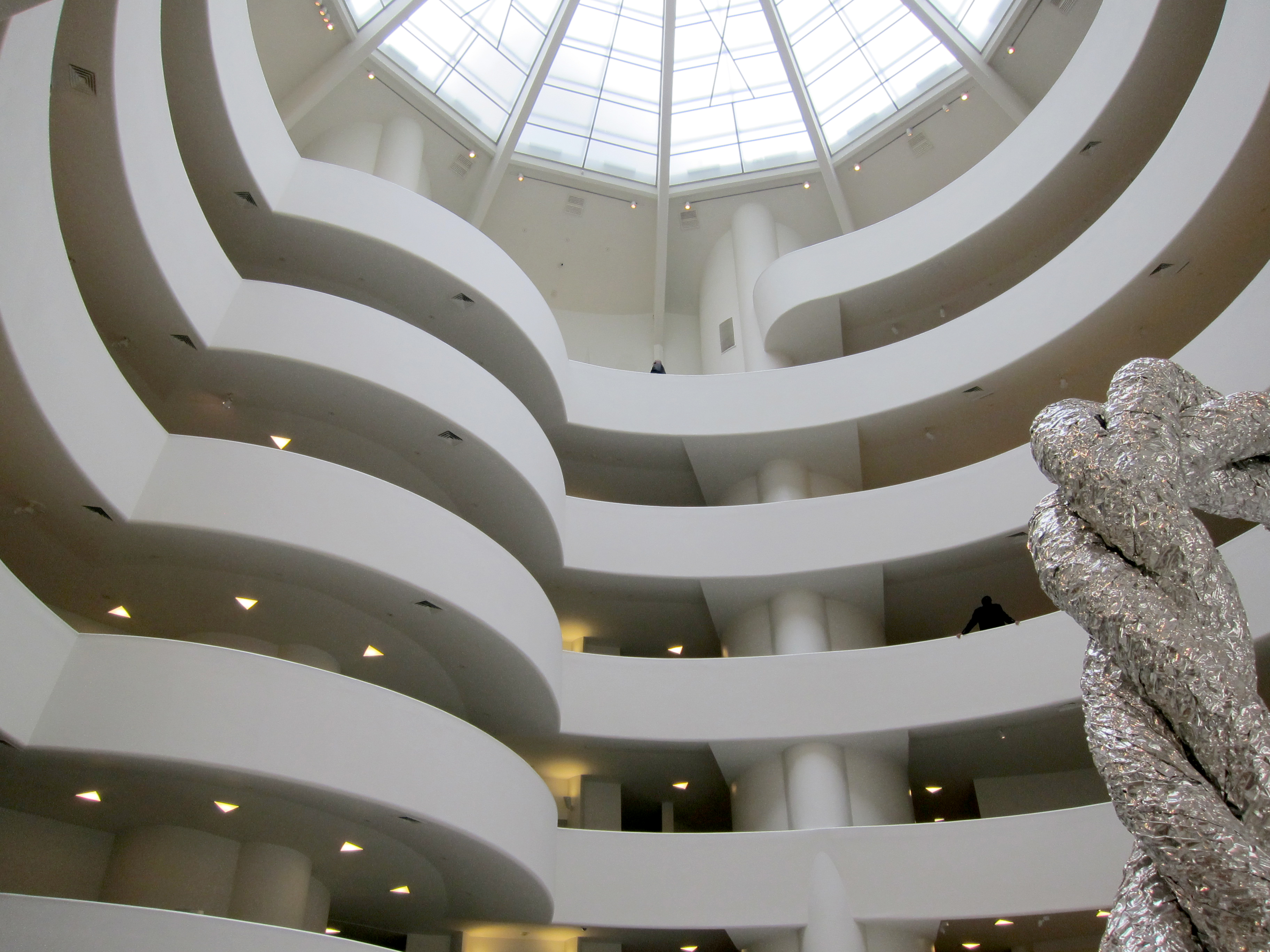
October 21: Atrium of the Solomon R. Guggenheim Museum designed by Frank Lloyd Wright.

- October 1 – The 10th anniversary of the People's Republic of China is celebrated with pomp across the country.
- October 7 – The Soviet probe Luna 3 sends back the first ever images of the far side of the Moon.
- October 12 – At the national Alianza Popular Revolucionaria Americana Congress in Peru, a group of leftist radicals is expelled from the party; they later form APRA Rebelde.
- October 13 – The United States launches research satellite Explorer 7.
- October 21 – The Solomon R. Guggenheim Museum of modern art (designed by Frank Lloyd Wright, who died on April 9) opens to the public in New York City.
- October 29 – First appearance of Astérix the Gaul, in a French comic magazine.

=== November ===
- November 1 – In Rwanda, Hutu politician Dominique Mbonyumutwa is beaten up by Tutsi forces, leading to a period of violence known as the wind of destruction.
- November 2 – At a ceremony near Toddington, British Minister of Transport Ernest Marples opens the first section of the M1 Motorway, between Watford and Crick, along with two spur motorways, the M45 and M10. Three decades of large scale motorway construction follow, leading to the rapid expansion of the UK motorway network.
- November 15 – The brutal Clutter family murders are committed in Holcomb, Kansas, United States, inspiring Truman Capote's In Cold Blood (1966).
- November 18 – Religious epic film Ben-Hur, starring Charlton Heston, which will be by far the highest-grossing film of the year and will go on to win a record 11 Academy Awards, premieres at New York City's Loews Theater in Ultra Panavision 70.
- November 20 – The Declaration of the Rights of the Child is adopted by the United Nations.
- November – The MOSFET (metal–oxide–semiconductor field-effect transistor), also known as the MOS transistor, is invented by Mohamed Atalla and Dawon Kahng at Bell Labs in the United States. It revolutionizes the electronics industry, becomes the fundamental building block of the Information Age and goes on to become the most widely manufactured device in history.

=== December ===
- December 1 – Cold War: Antarctic Treaty – 12 countries, including the United States and the Soviet Union, sign a landmark treaty that sets aside Antarctica as a scientific preserve and bans military activity on the continent (the first arms control agreement established during the Cold War).
- December 2 – Malpasset Dam in southern France collapses and water flows over the town of Fréjus, killing 412.
- December 8 – The life-boat Mona, based at Broughty Ferry in Scotland, capsizes during a rescue attempt with the loss of 8 lives.
- December 11 – Charles Robberts Swart is appointed the 11th Governor-General of the Union of South Africa.
- December 14 – Makarios III is selected as the first president of Cyprus.

=== Date unknown ===
- Nylon pantyhose, or sheer tights, are first sold on the open market as 'Panti-Legs' by Glen Raven Knitting Mills in the United States.
- The first known human with HIV dies in the Congo.
- The Caspian tiger becomes extinct in Iran.
- The Henney Kilowatt goes on sale in the United States, becoming the first production electric car in almost three decades, but only 47 models will be sold in its 2-year production run.
- Car tailfin design reaches its apex in the United States with such as the Cadillac Eldorado, Chevrolet Impala second generation model, Dodge Silver Challenger and Imperial Crown Sedan.

== Births ==
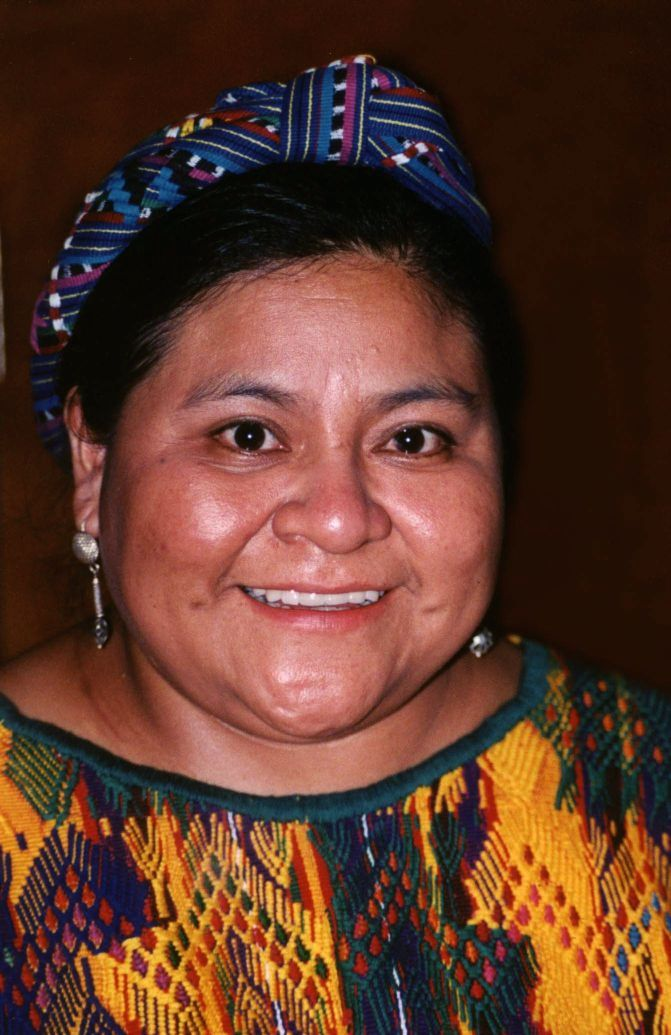
Rigoberta Menchú

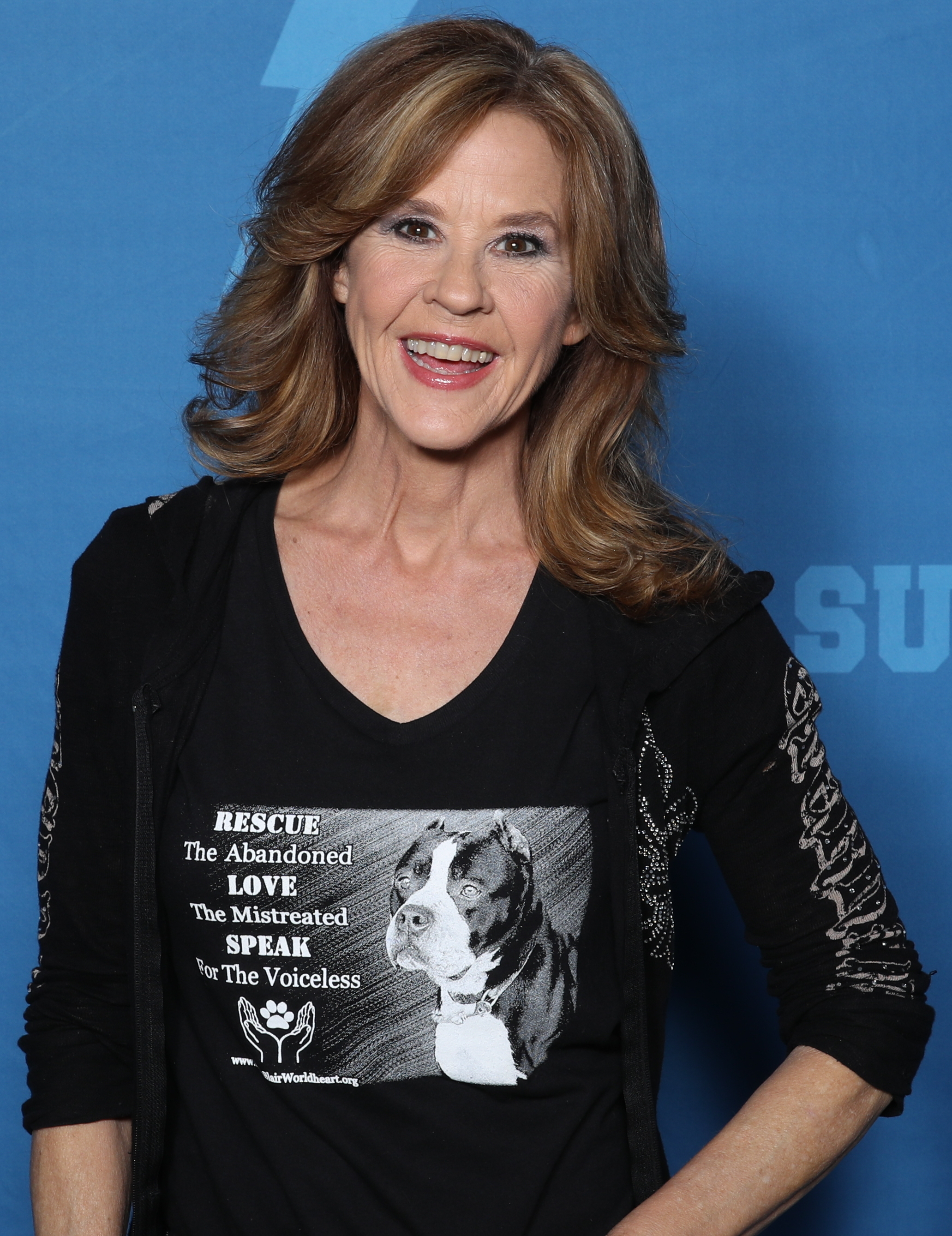
Linda Blair

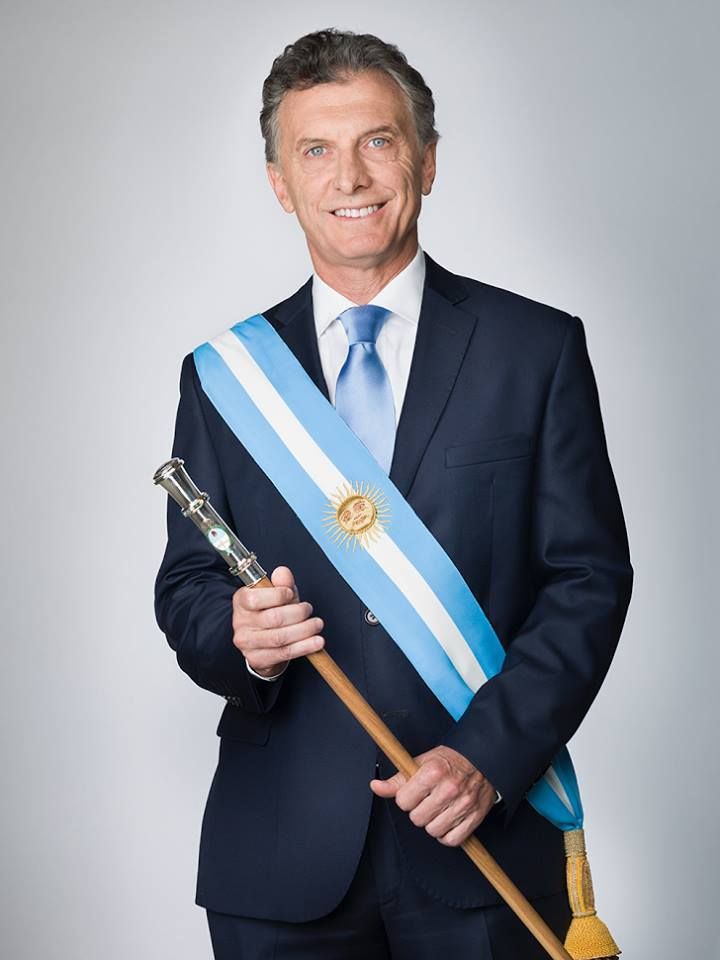
Mauricio Macri

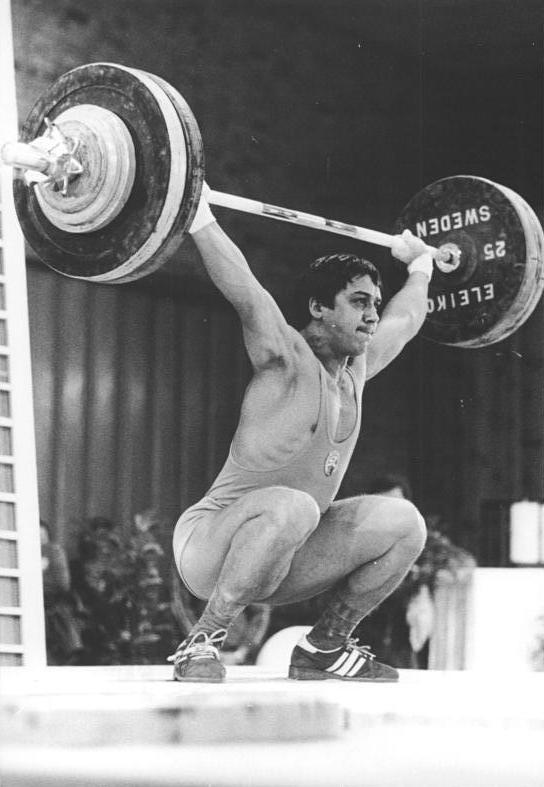
Joachim Kunz

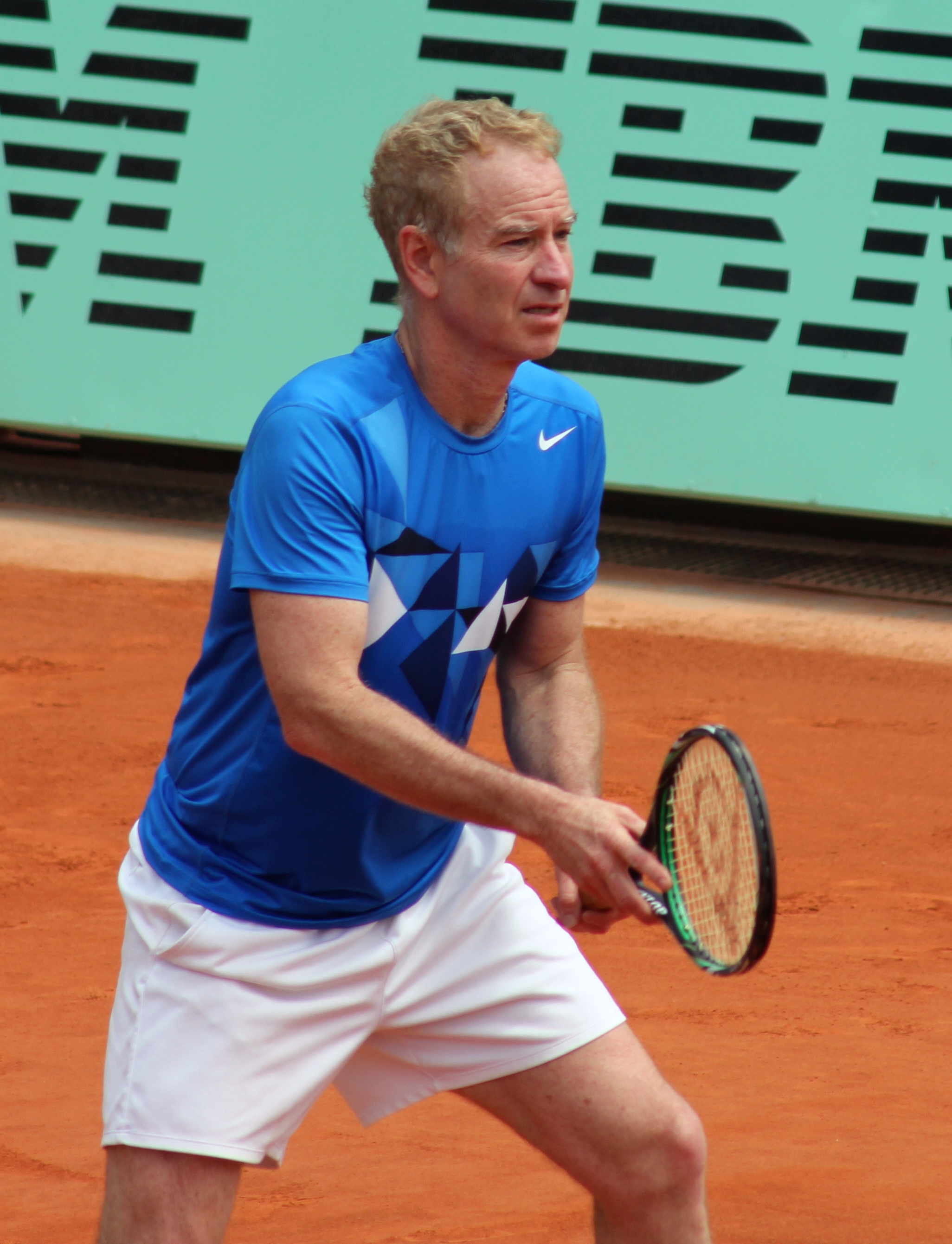
John McEnroe

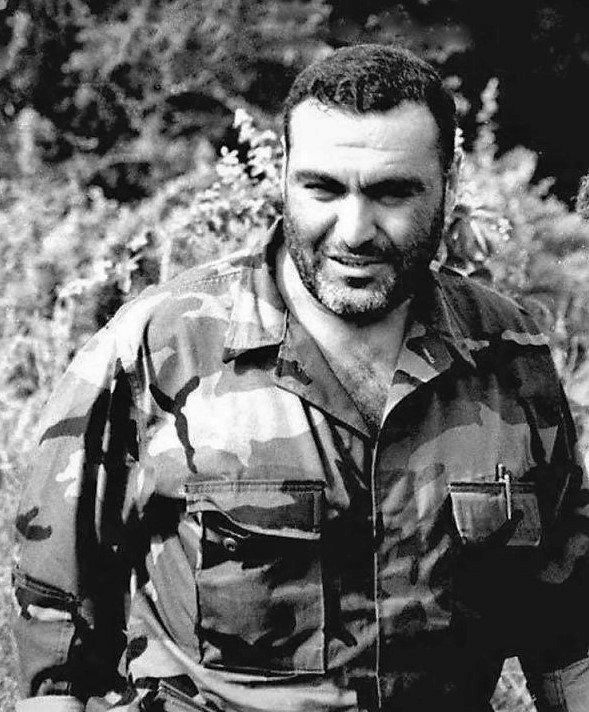
Vazgen Sargsyan

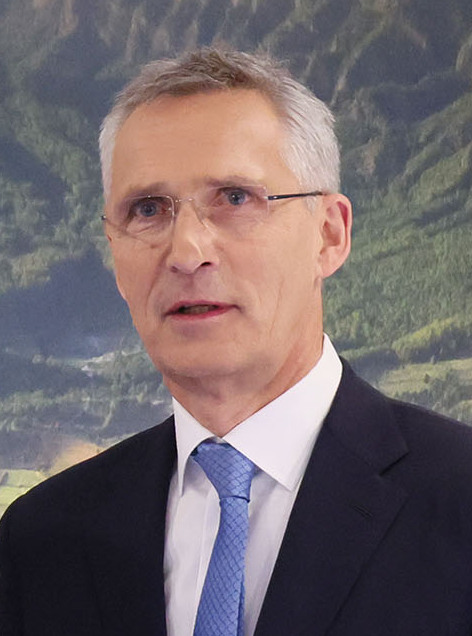
Jens Stoltenberg

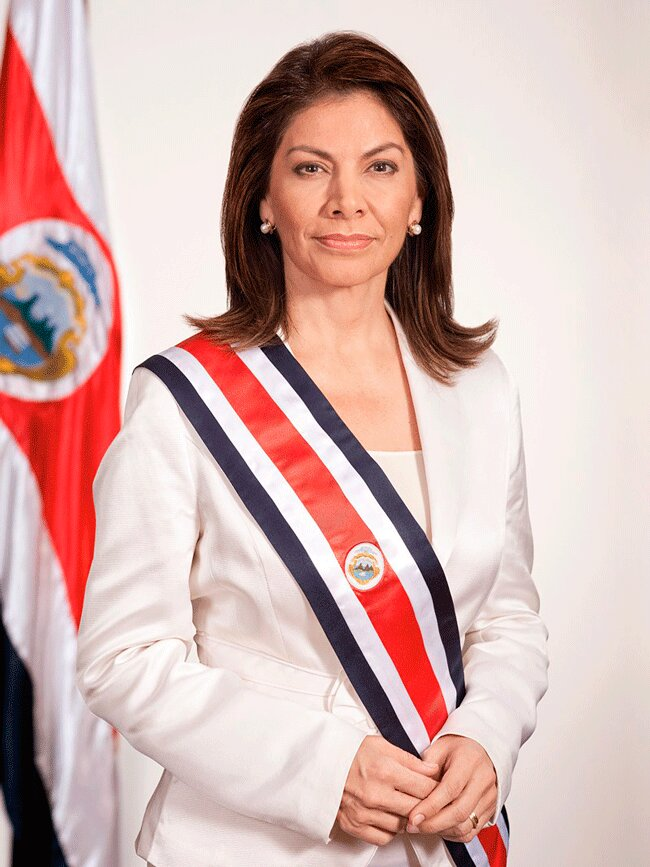
Laura Chinchilla

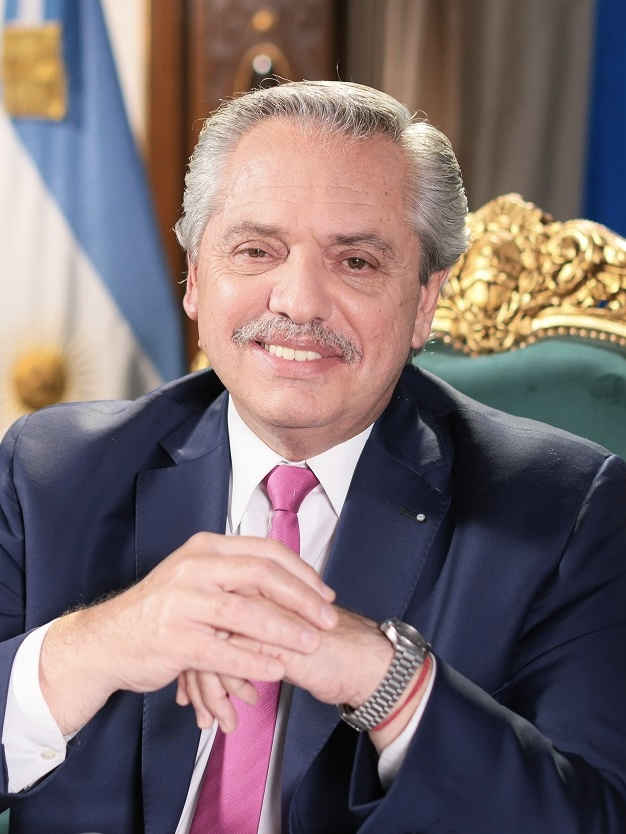
Alberto Fernández

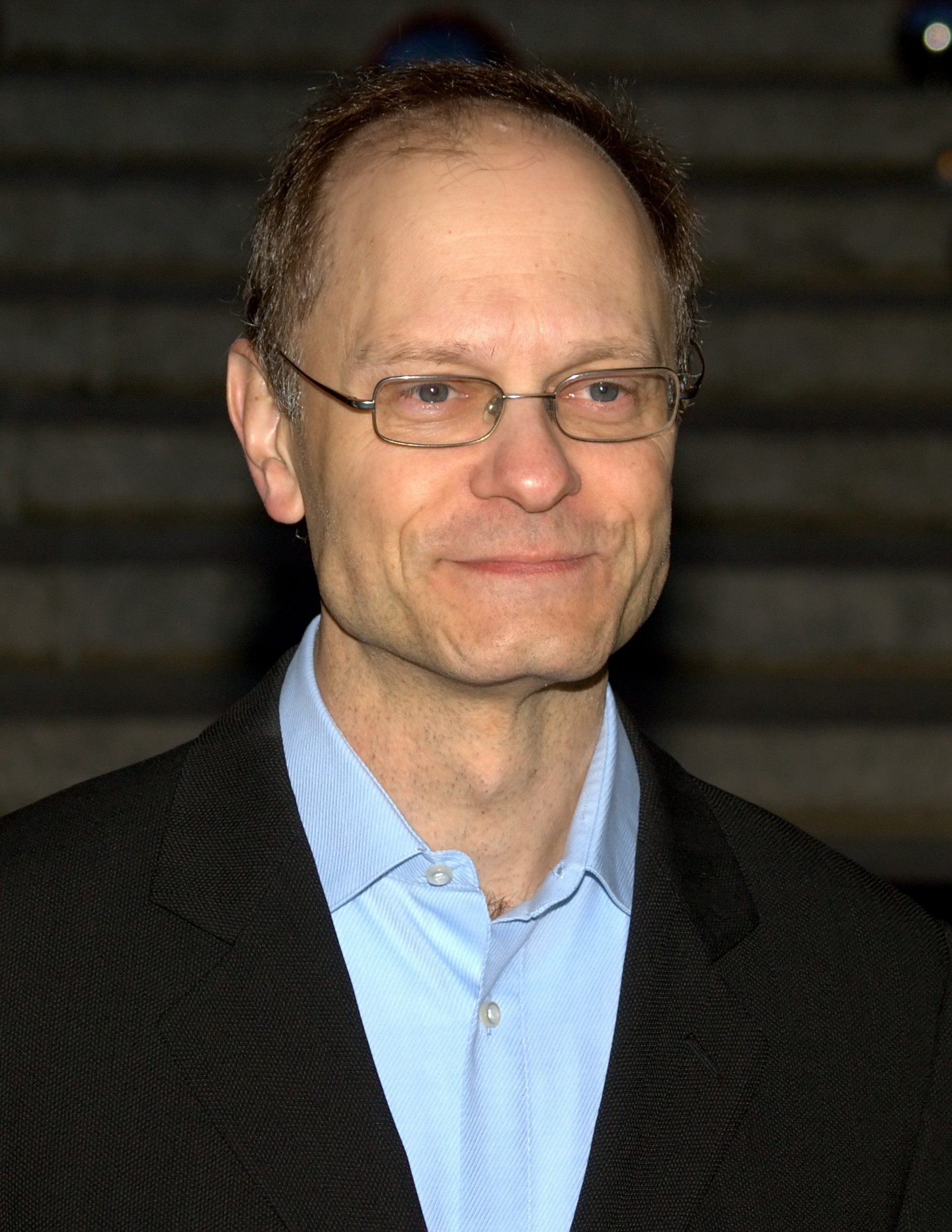
David Hyde Pierce

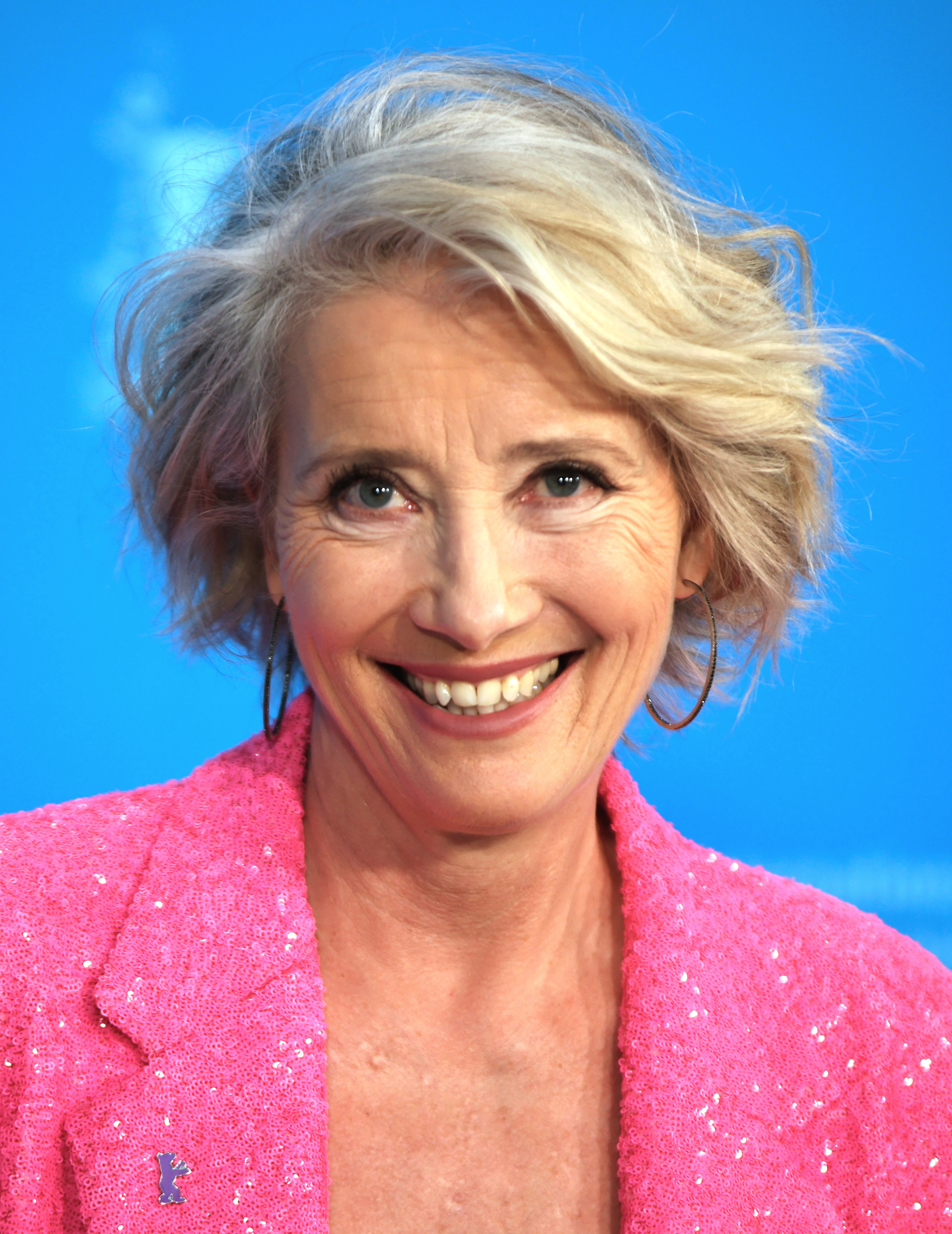
Dame Emma Thompson

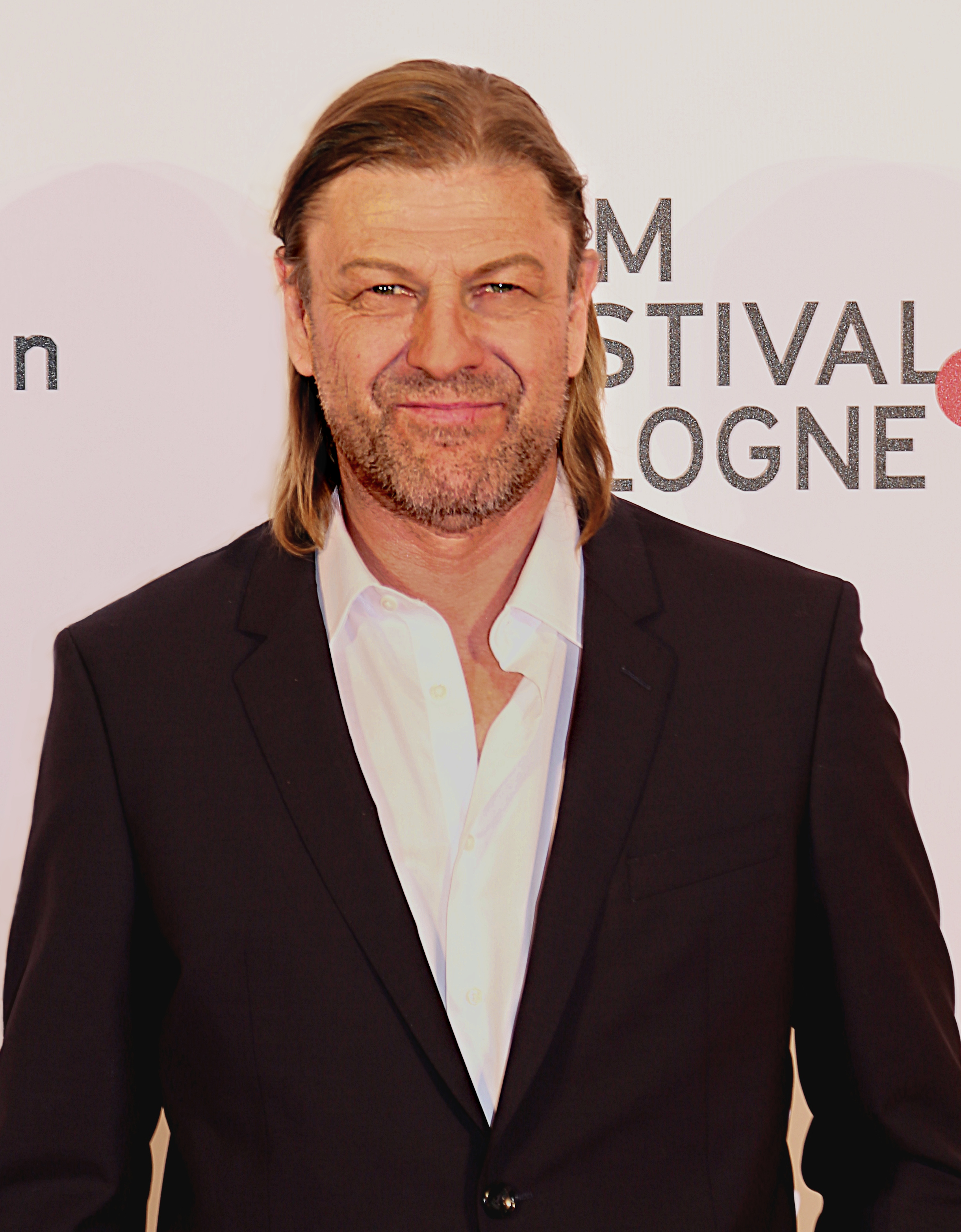
Sean Bean

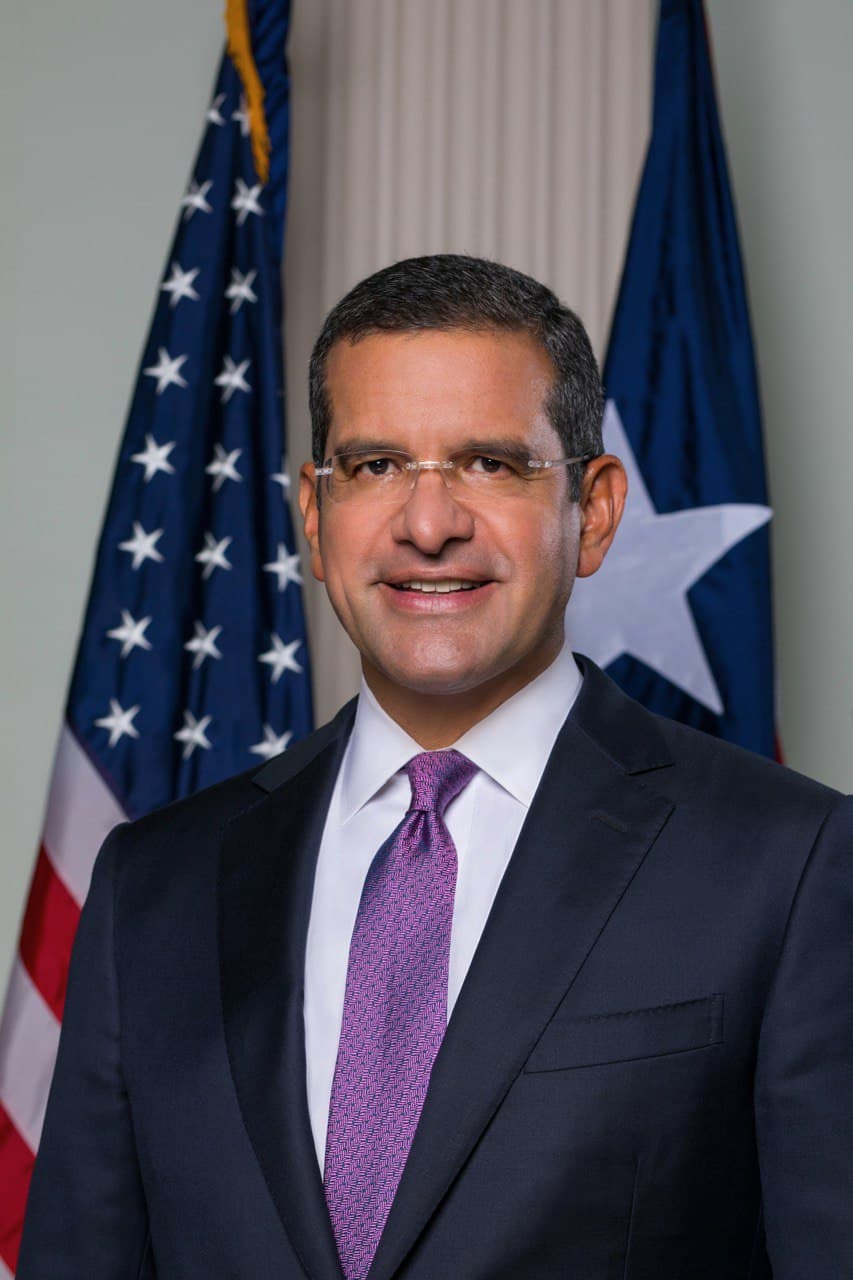
Pedro Pierluisi

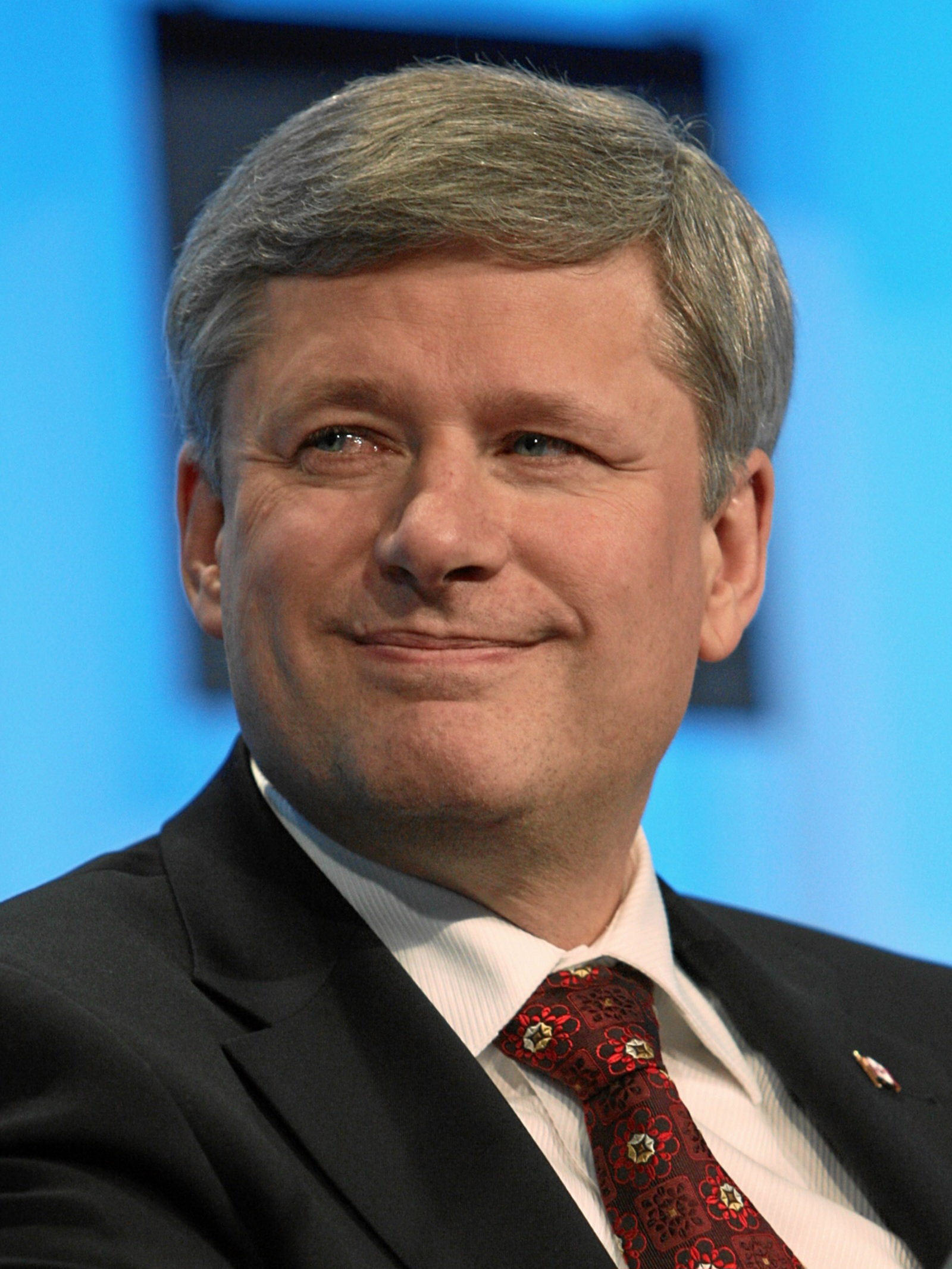
Stephen Harper

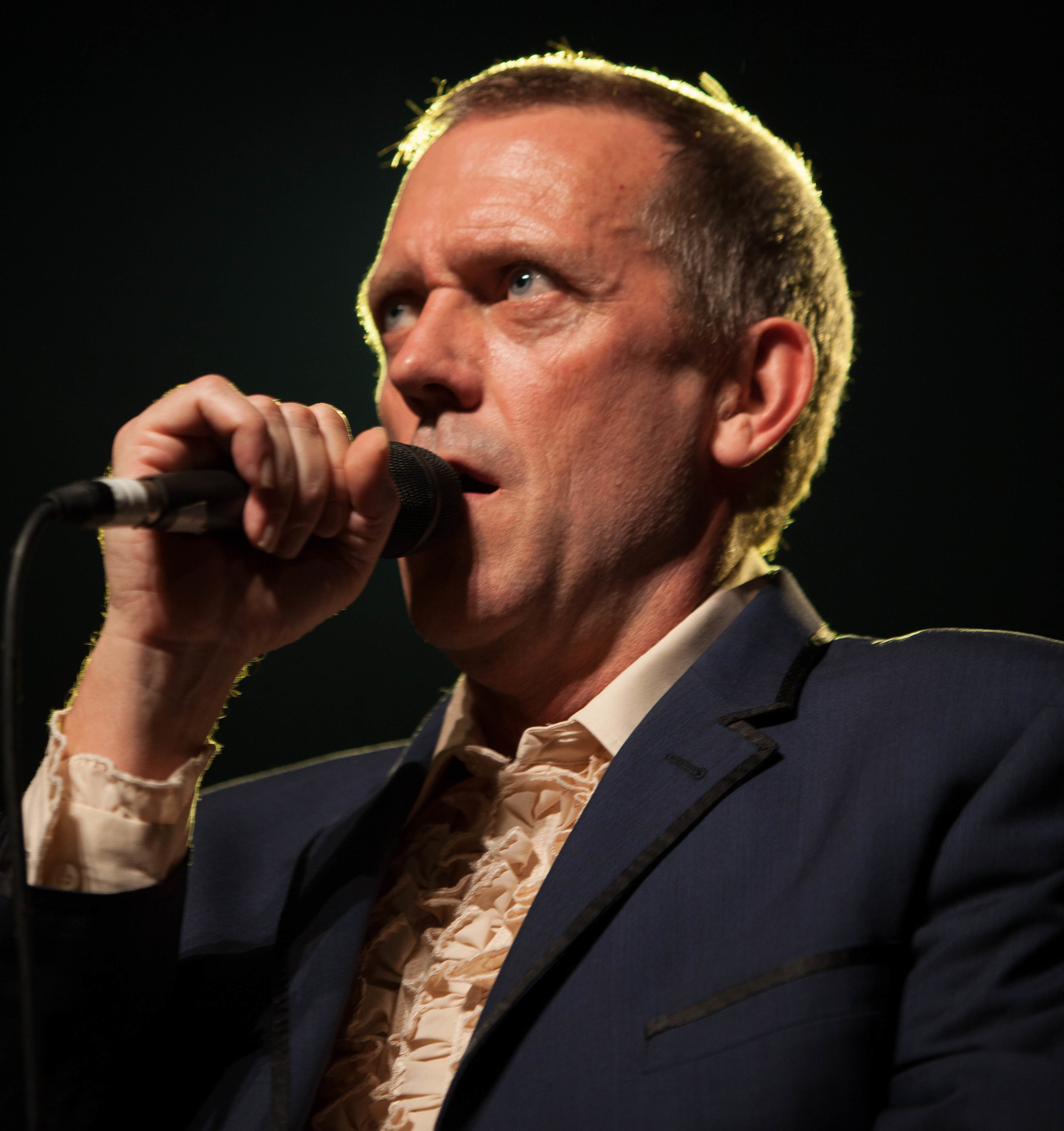
Hugh Laurie

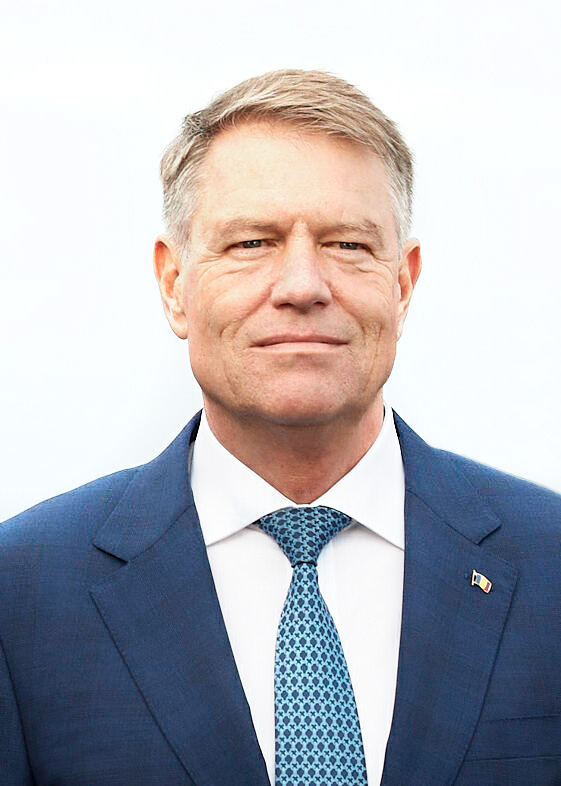
Klaus Iohannis

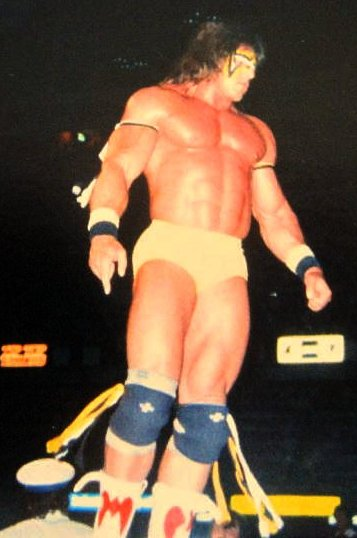
Ultimate Warrior

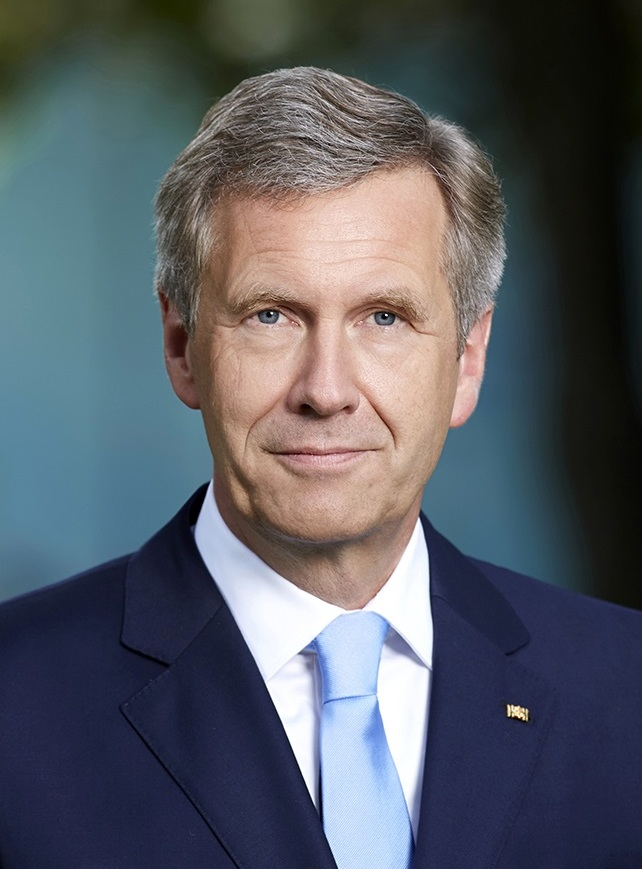
Christian Wulff

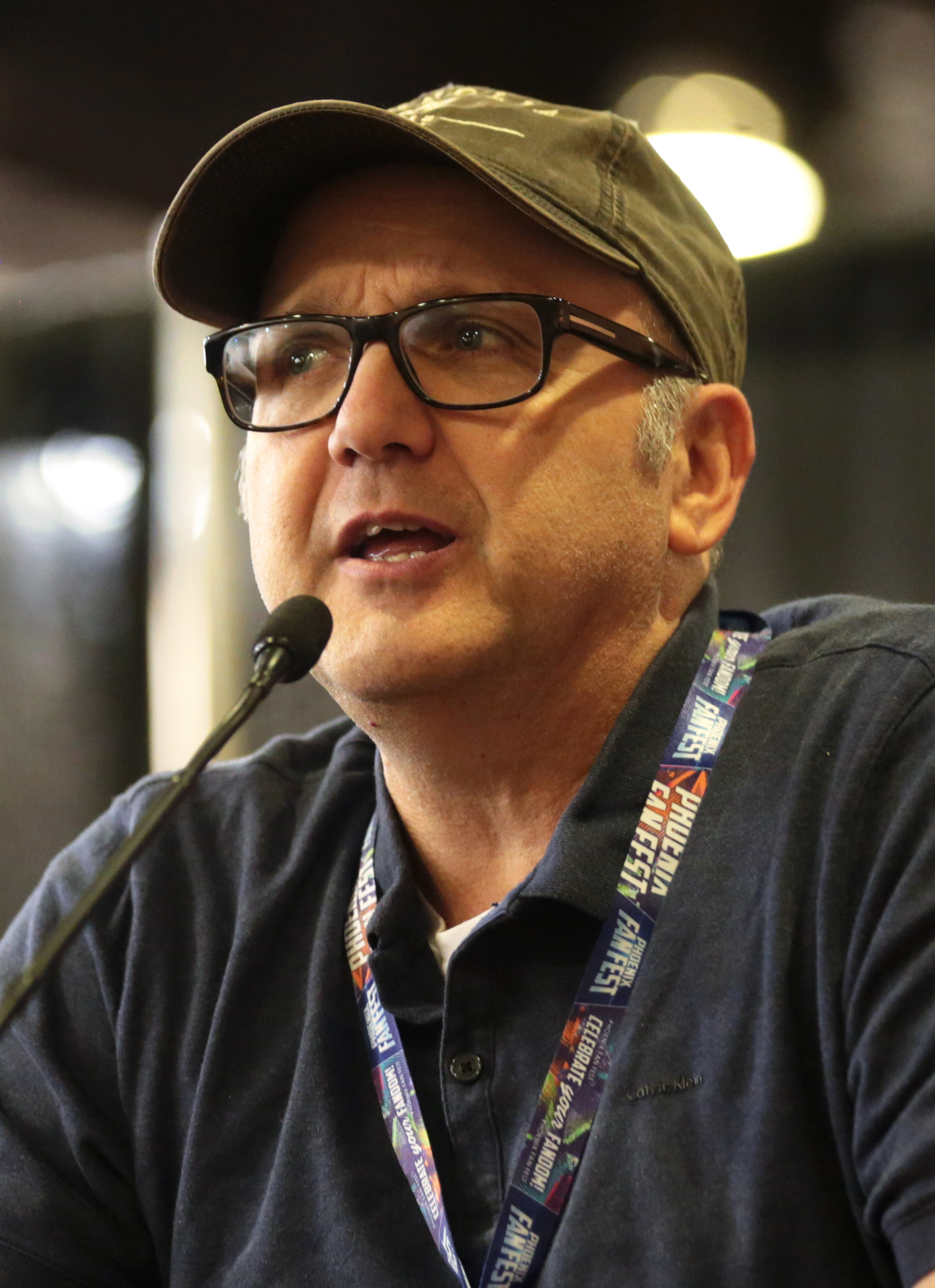
Paris Themmen

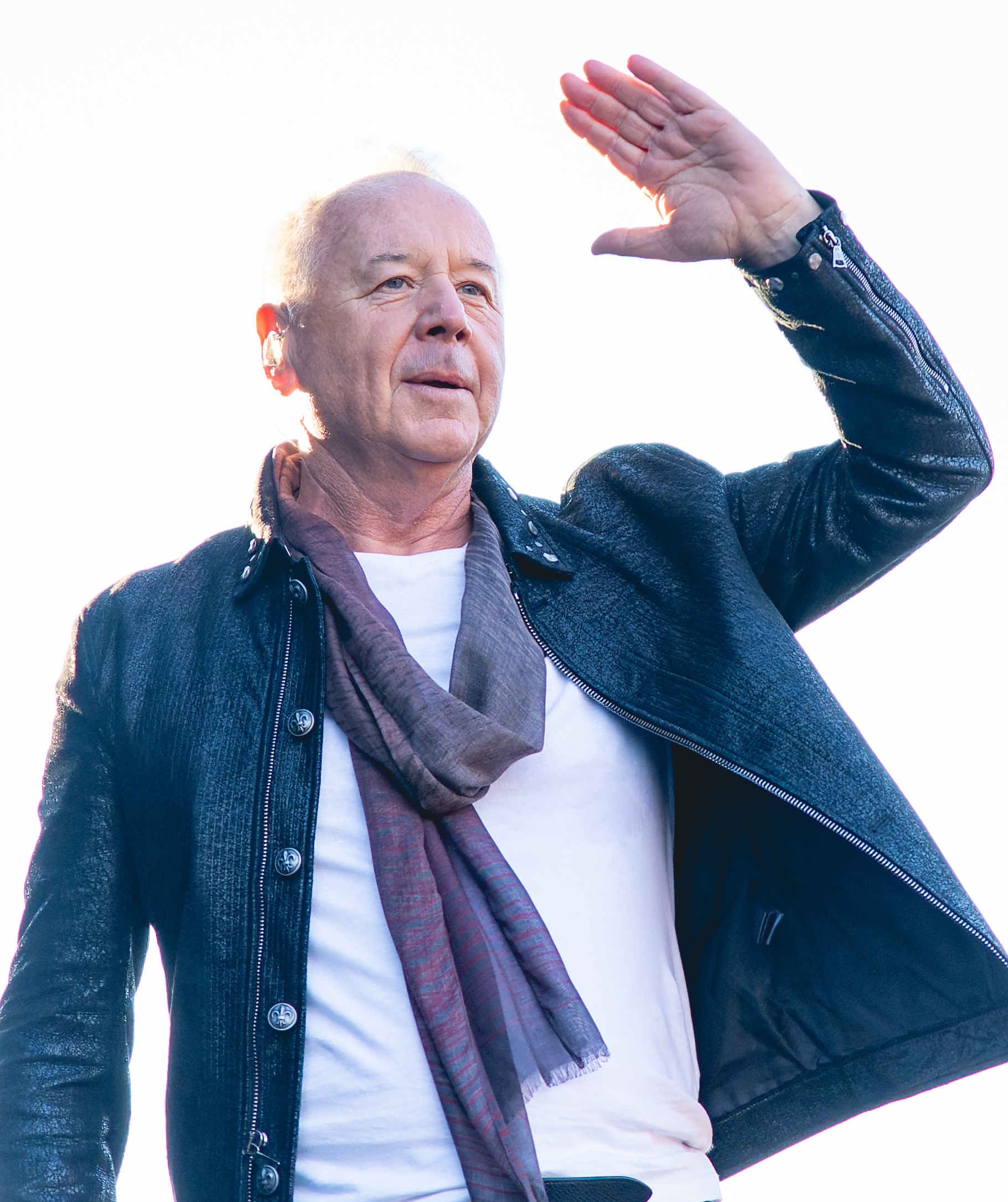
Jim Kerr

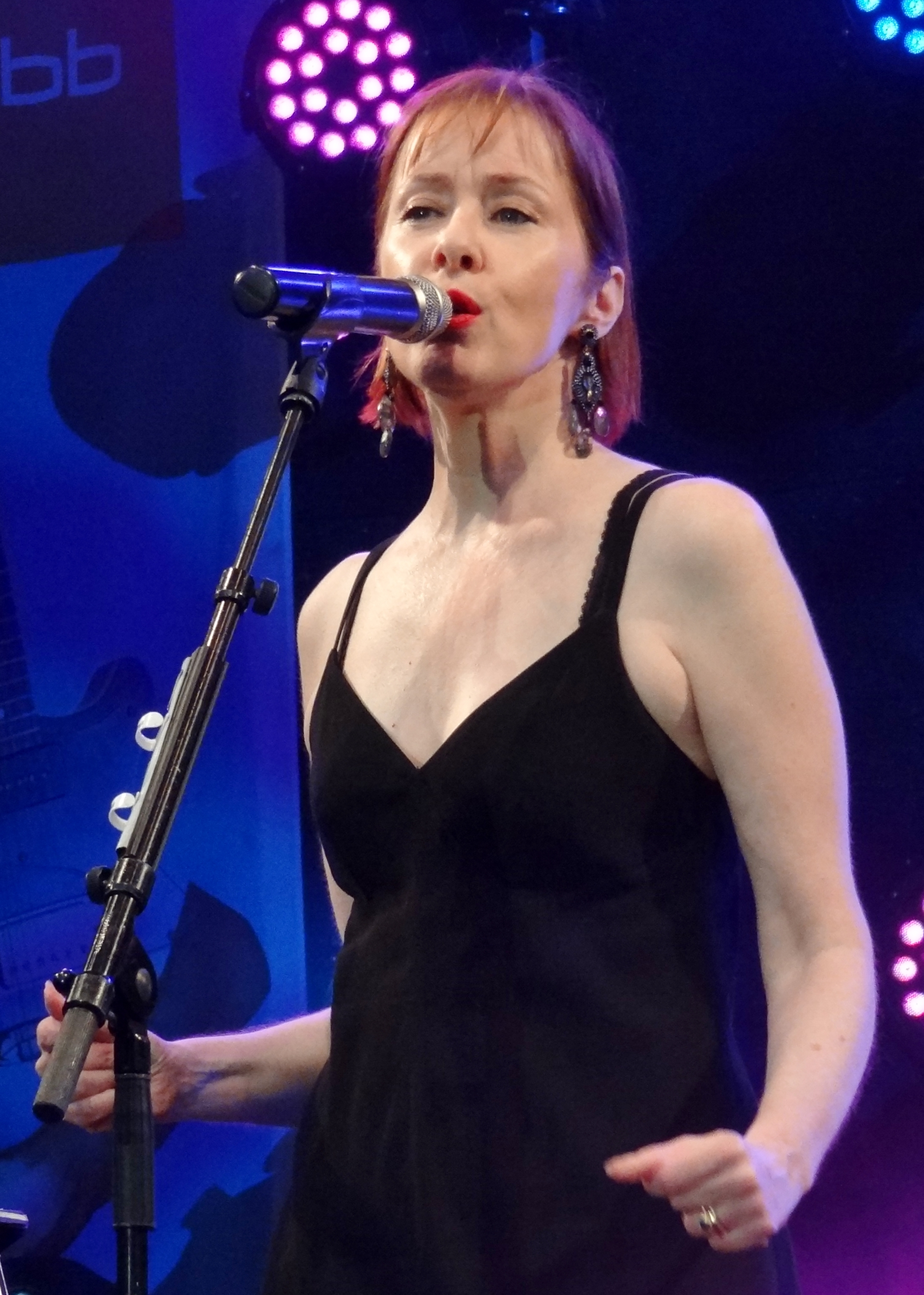
Suzanne Vega

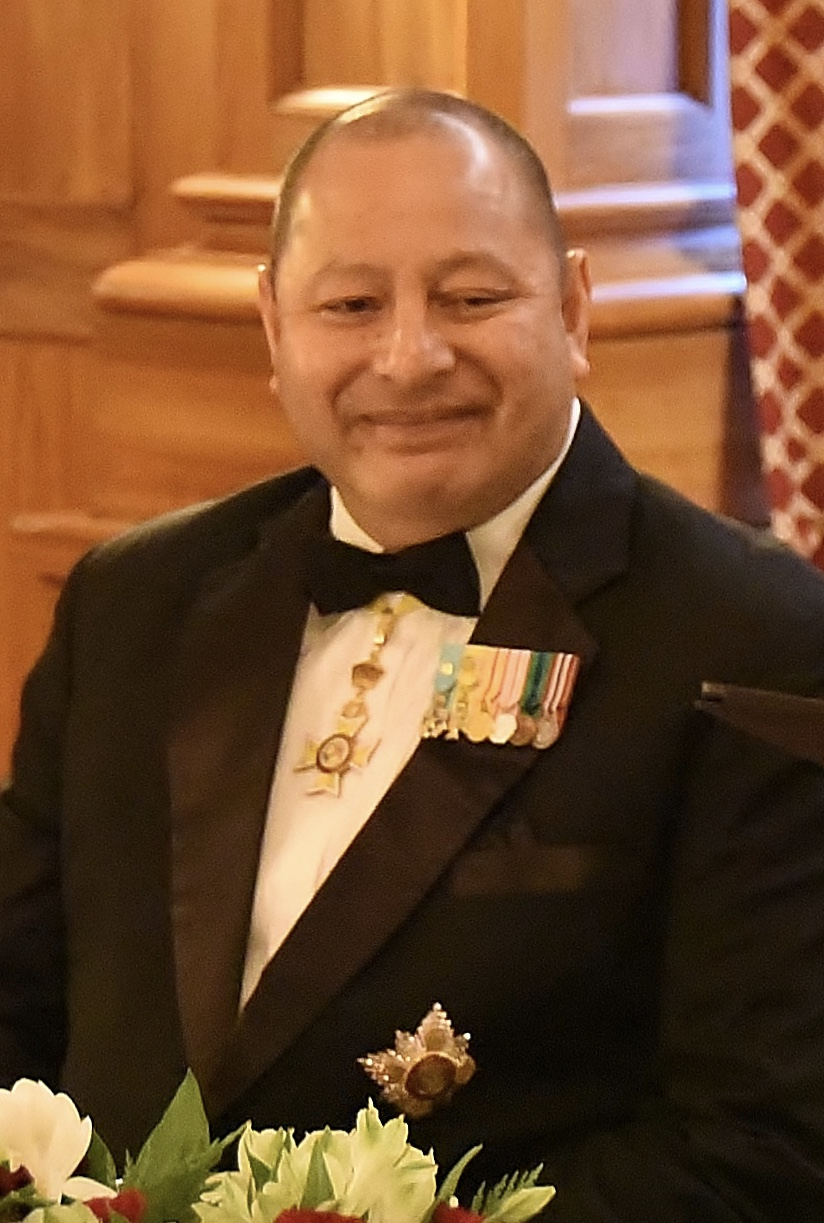
Tupou VI

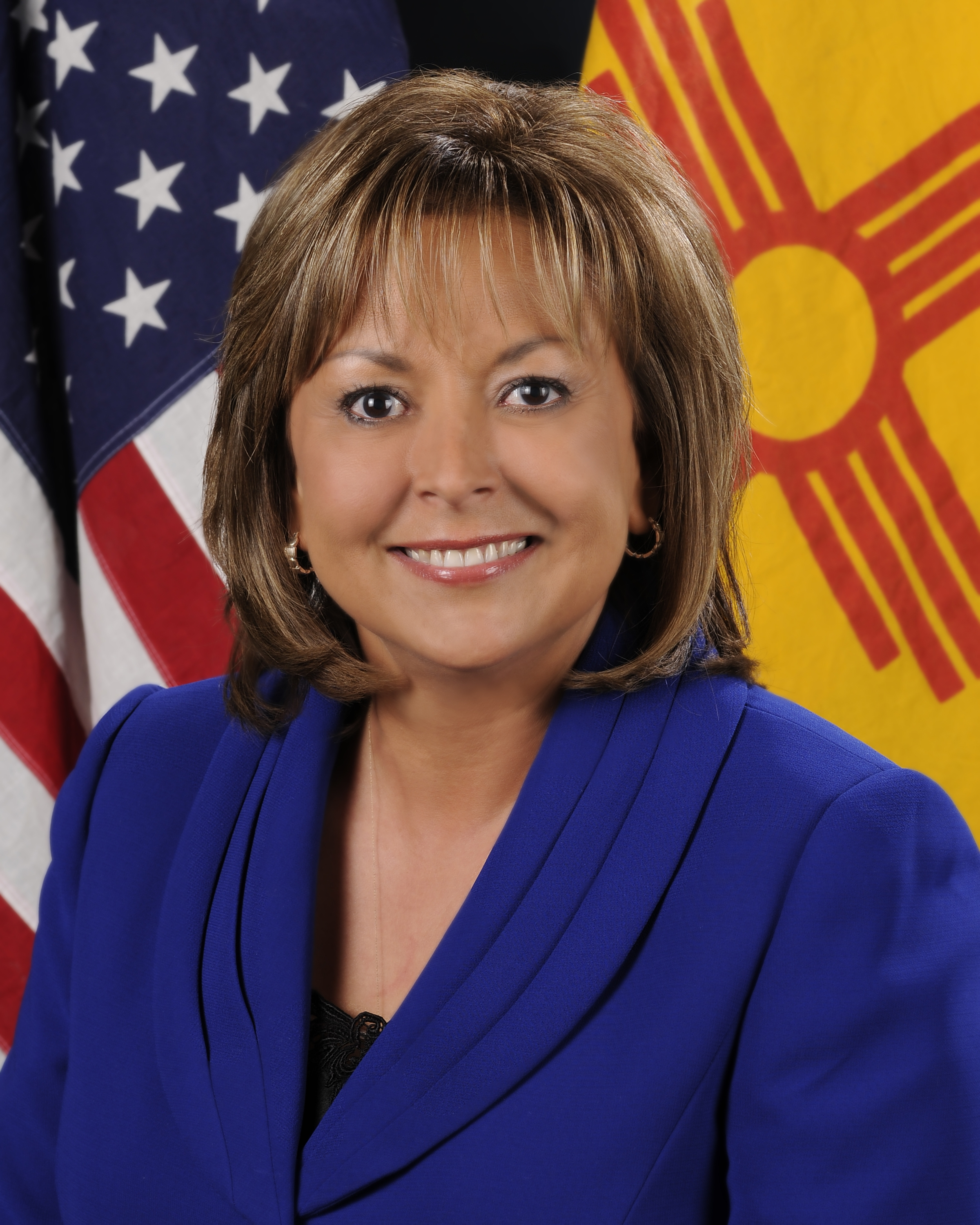
Susana Martinez

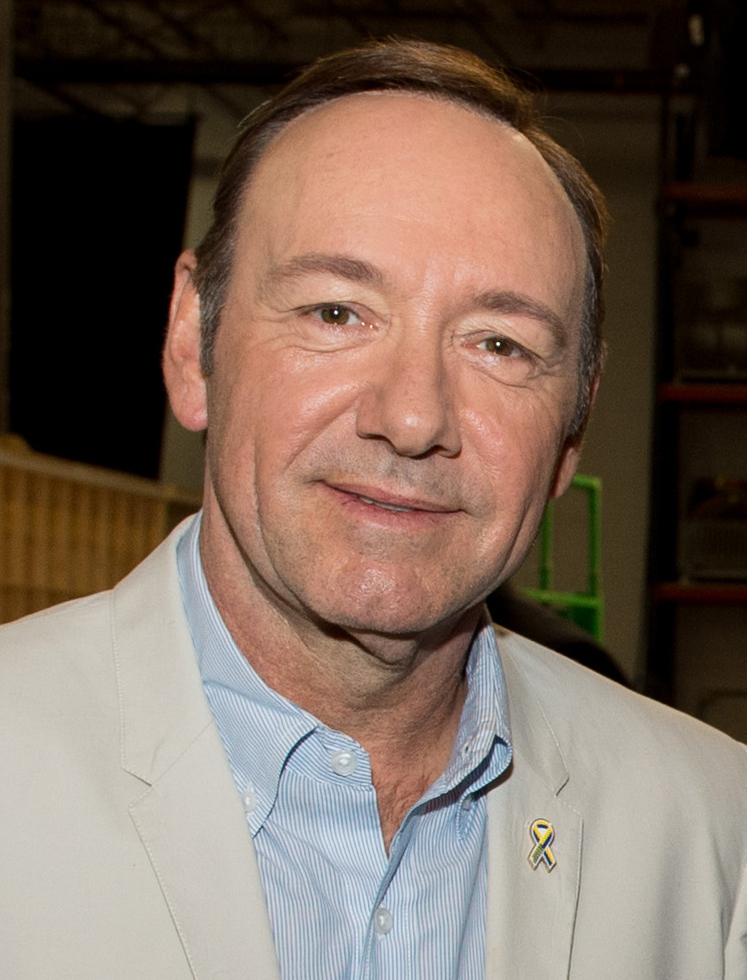
Kevin Spacey

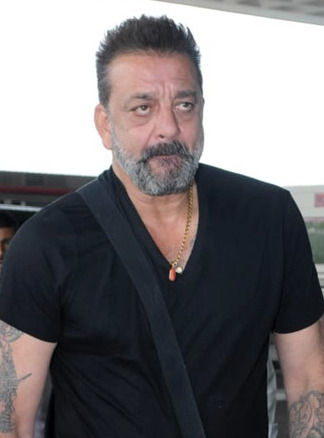
Sanjay Dutt

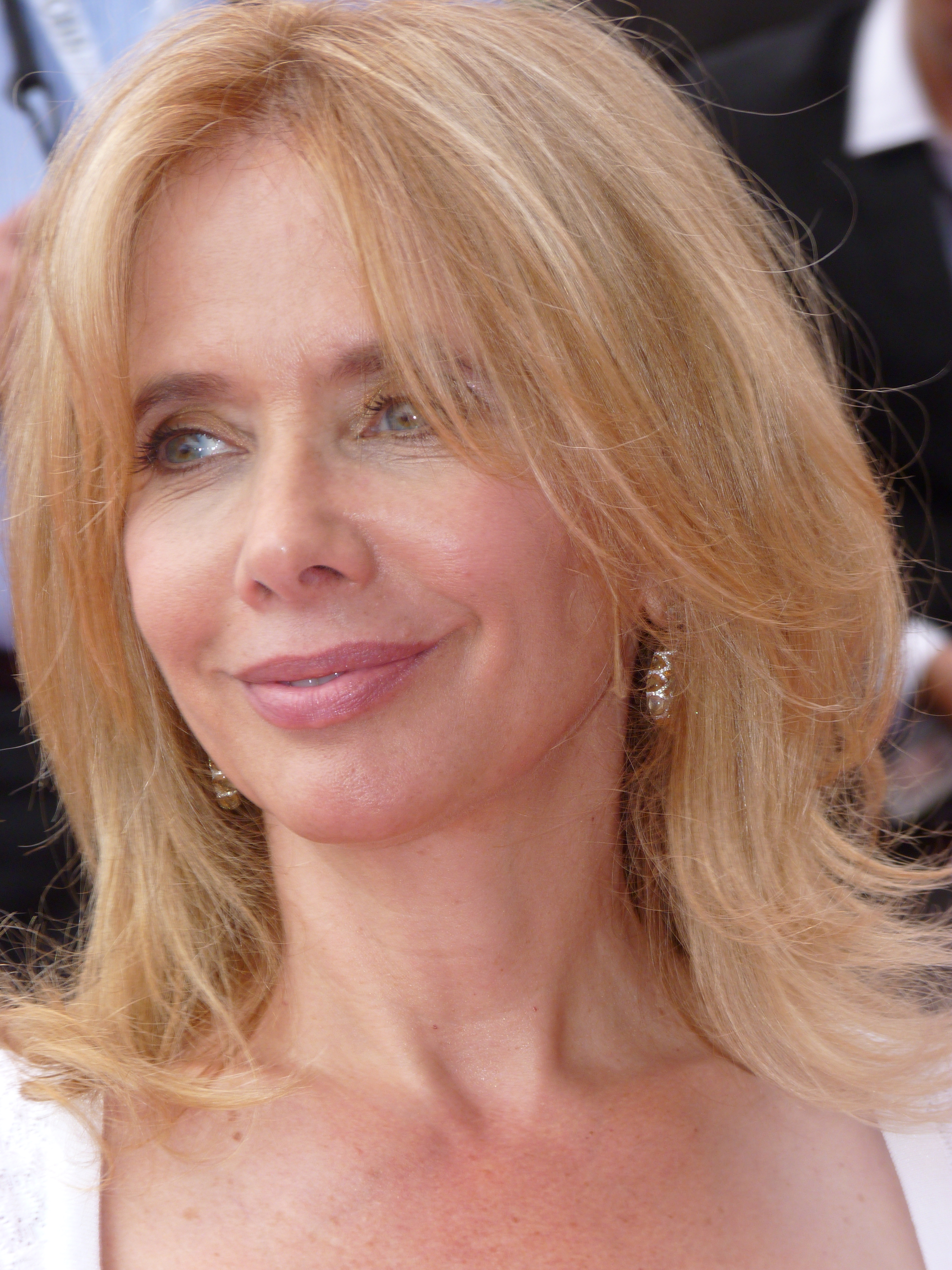
Rosanna Arquette

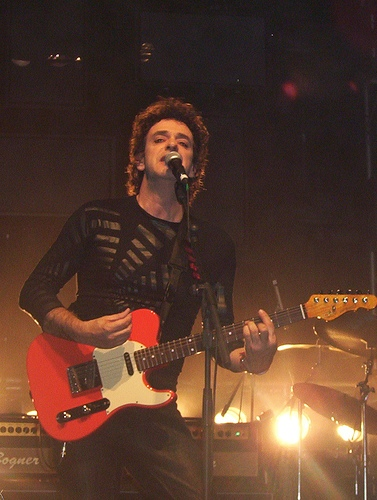
Gustavo Cerati

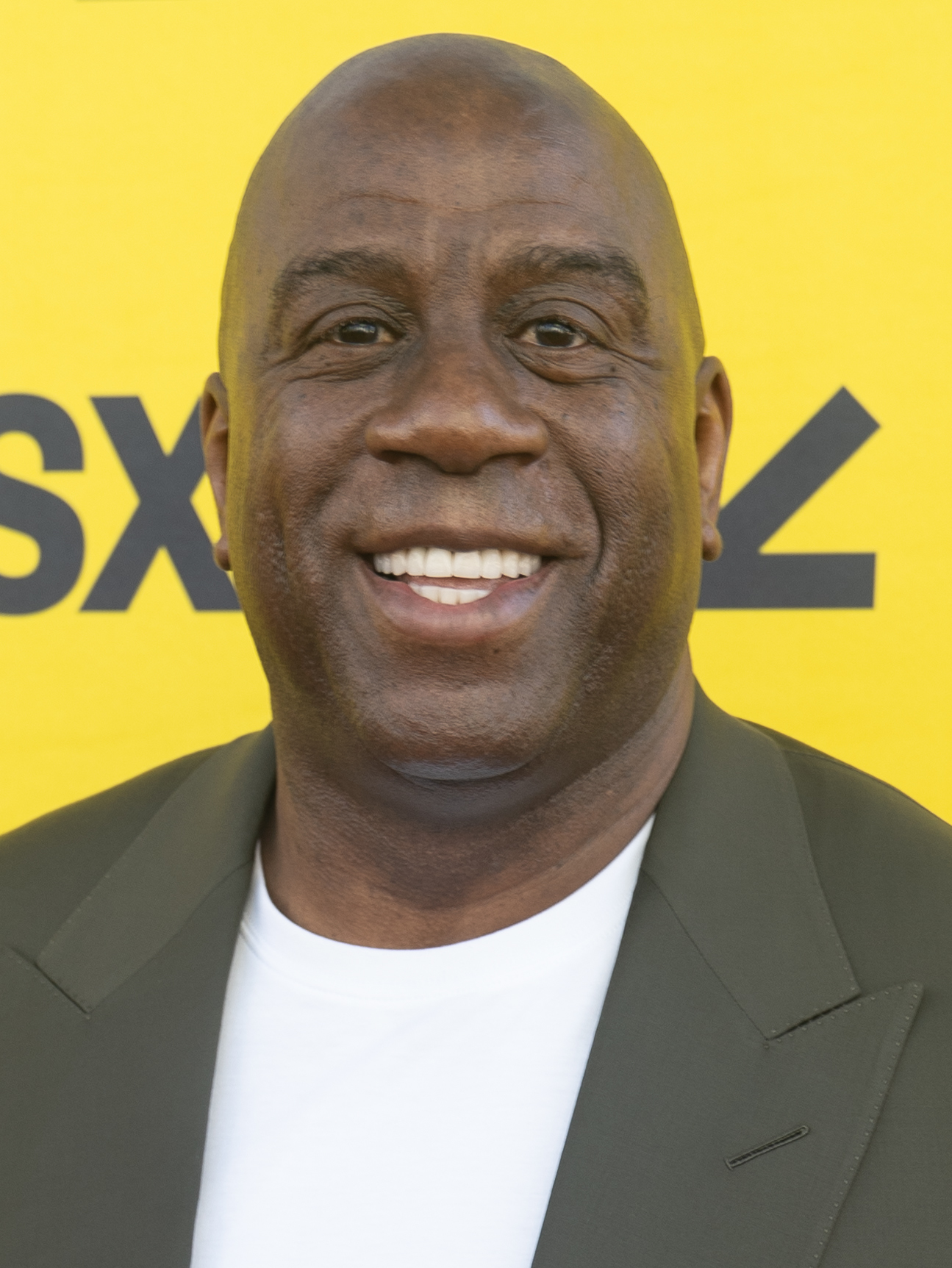
Magic Johnson

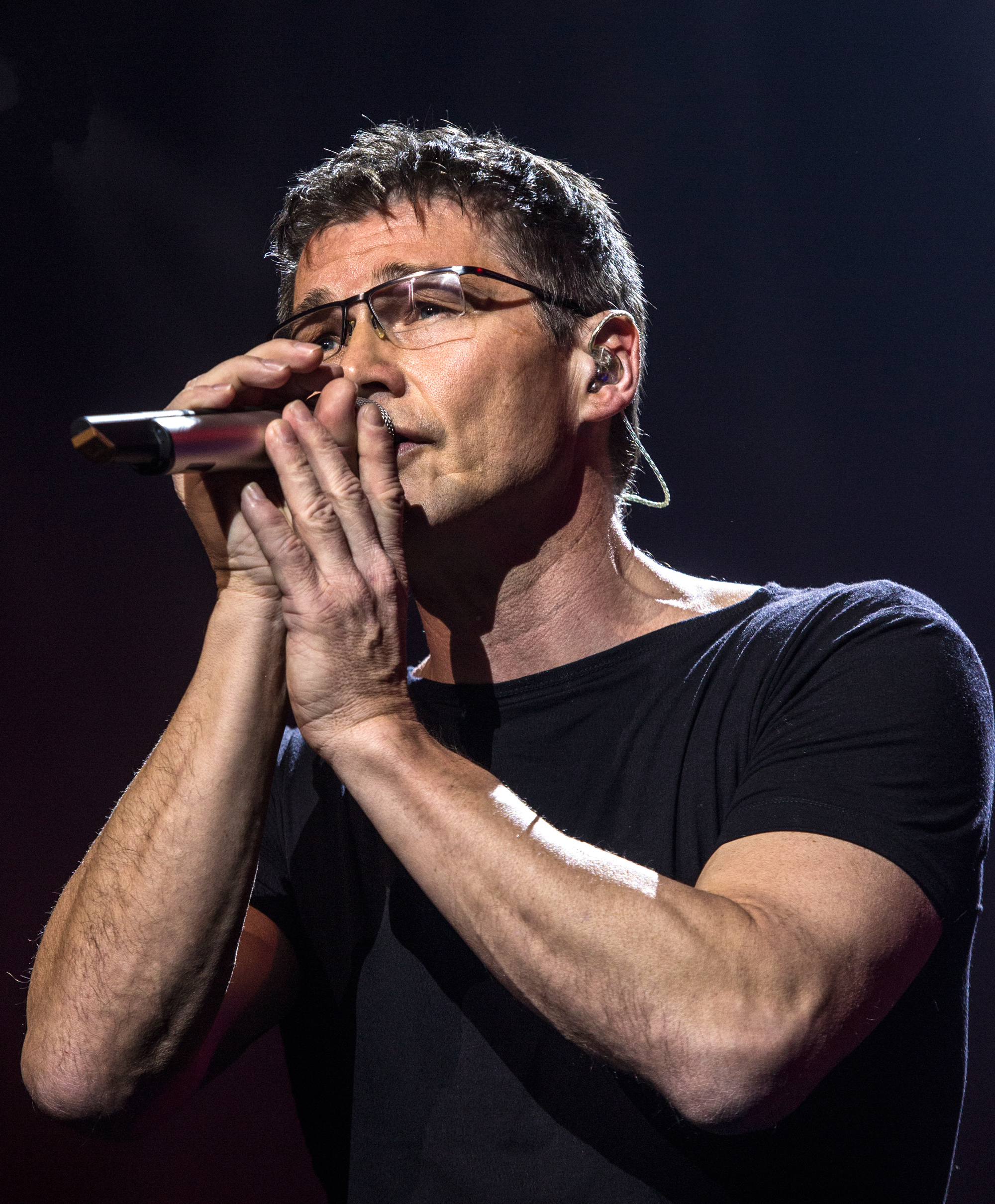
Morten Harket

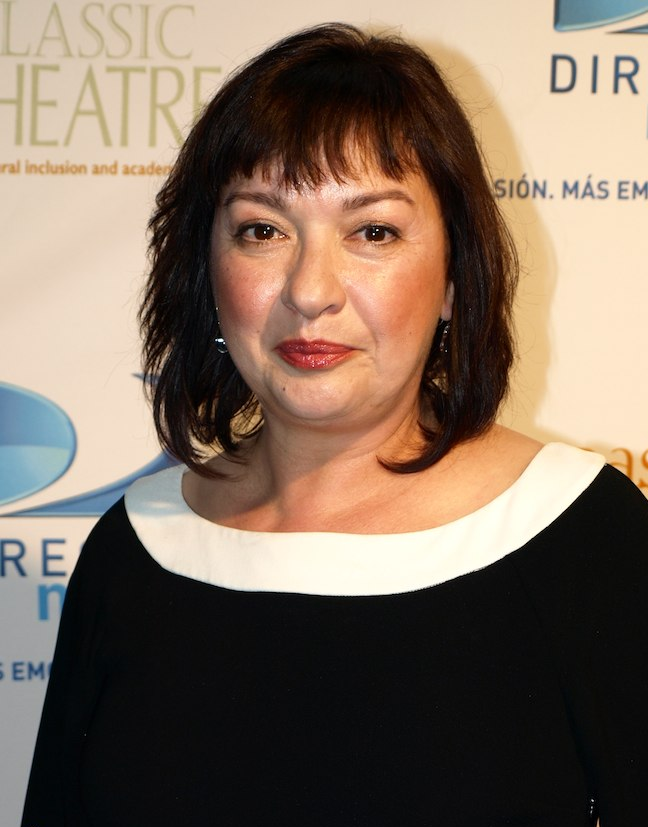
Elizabeth Peña

Simon Cowell

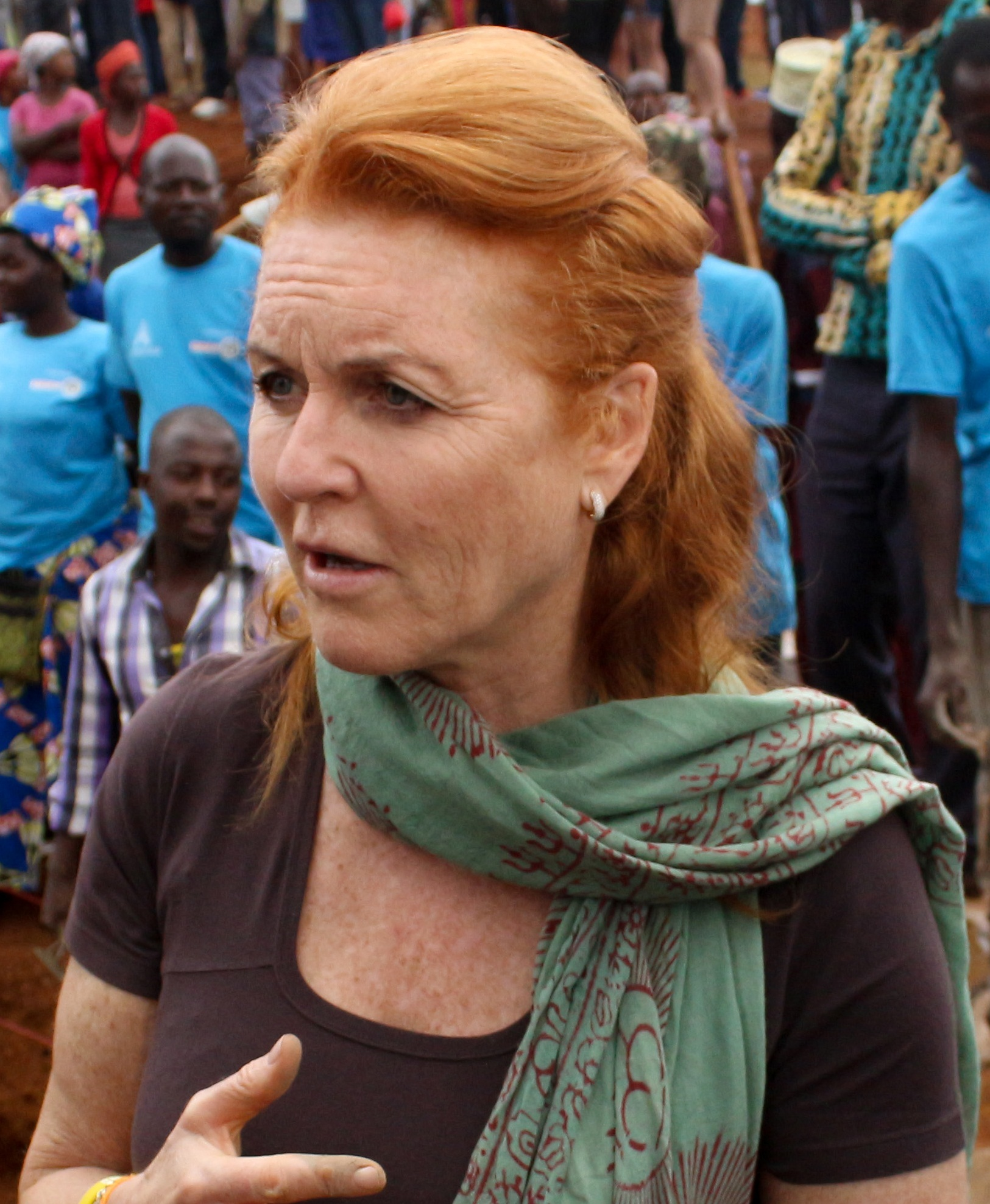
Sarah Ferguson

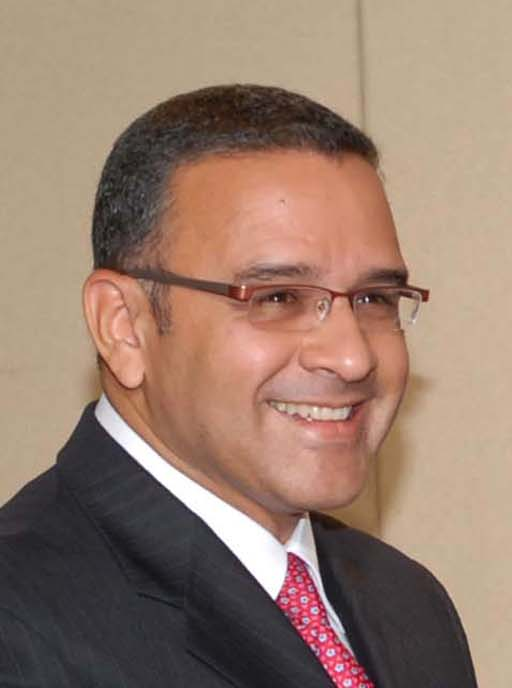
Mauricio Funes

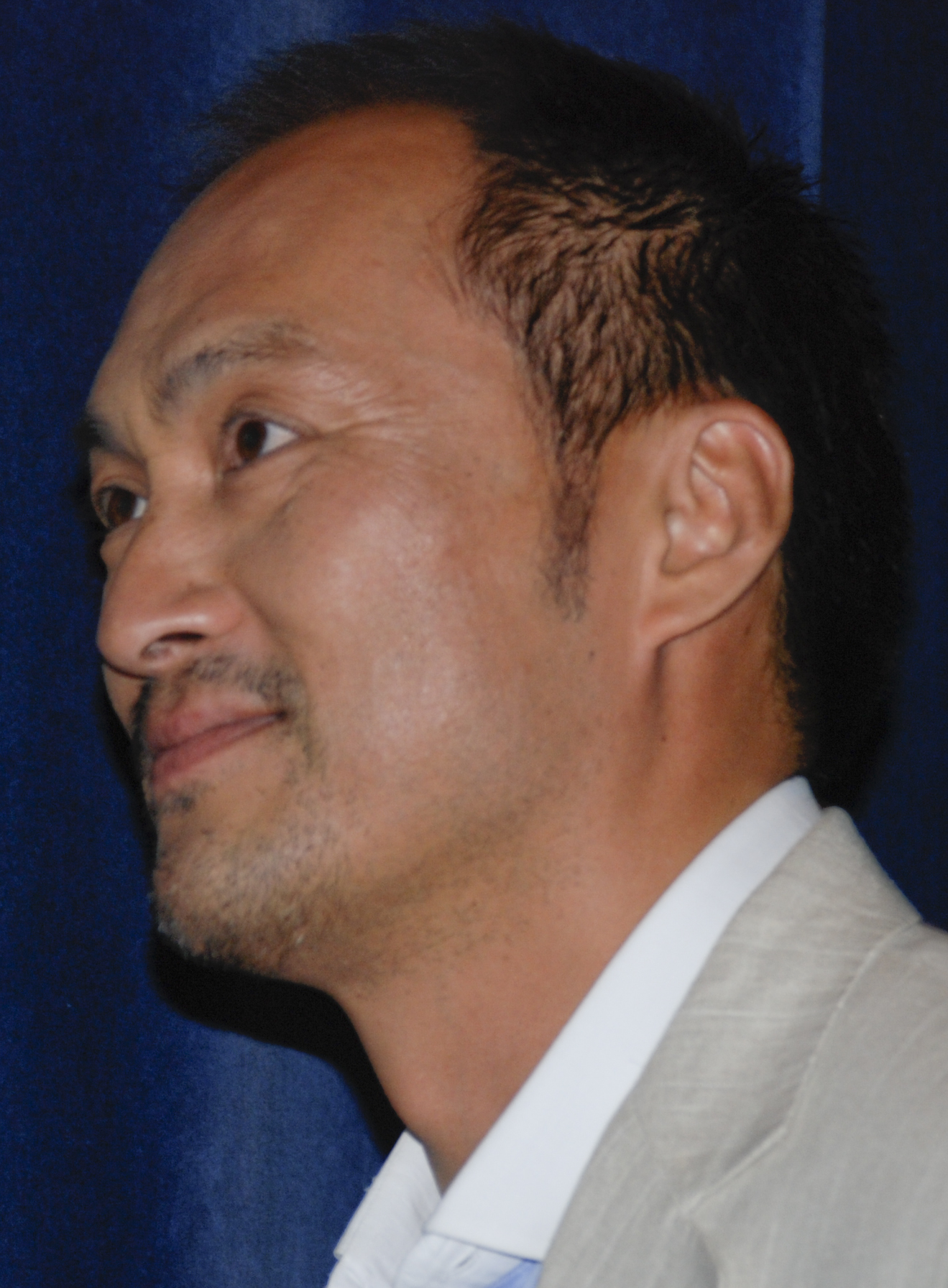
Ken Watanabe

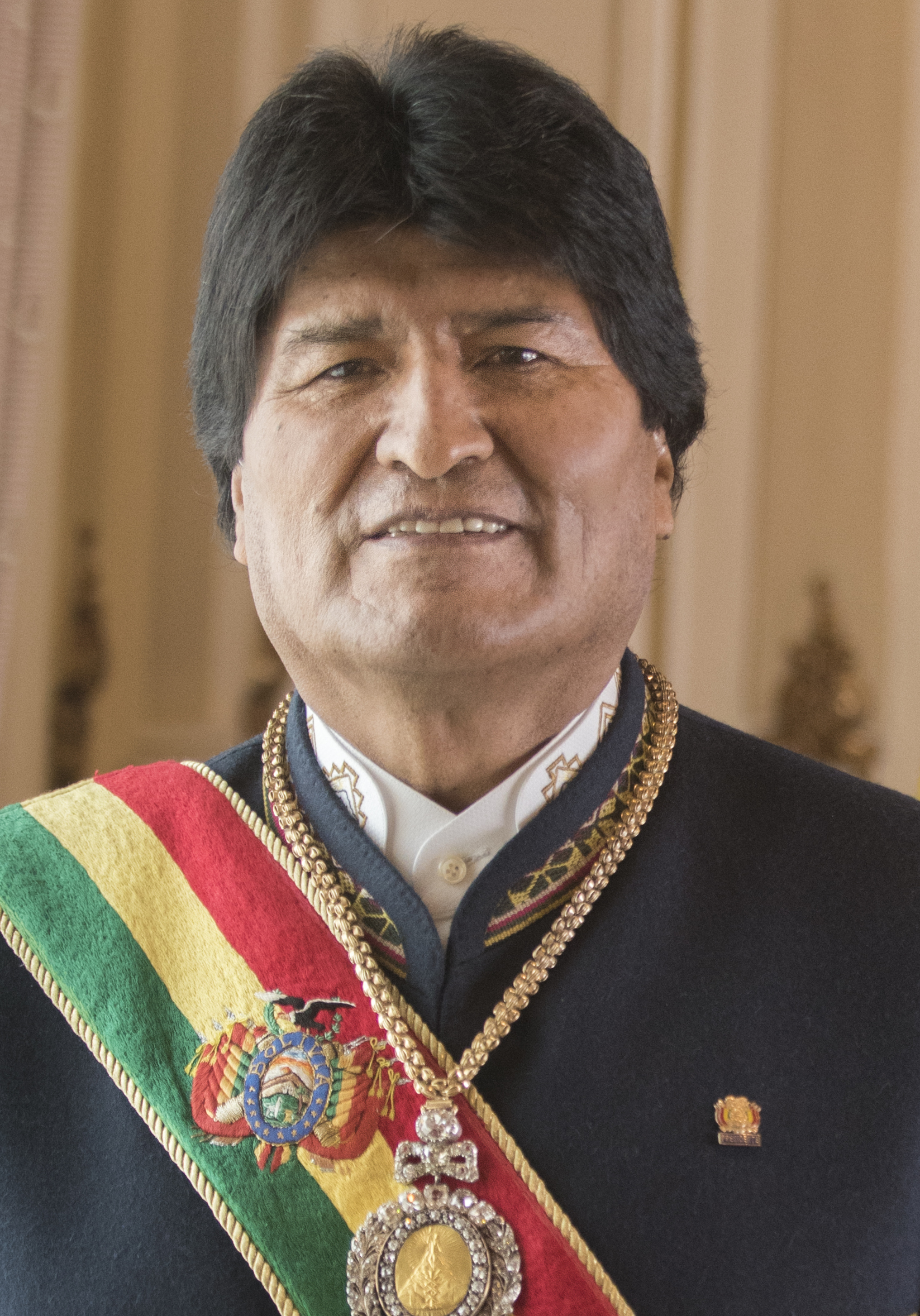
Evo Morales

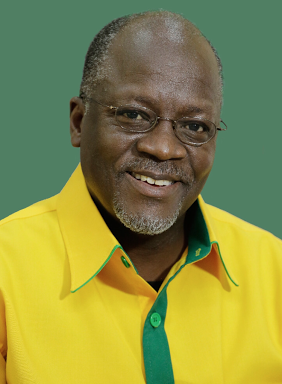
John Magufuli

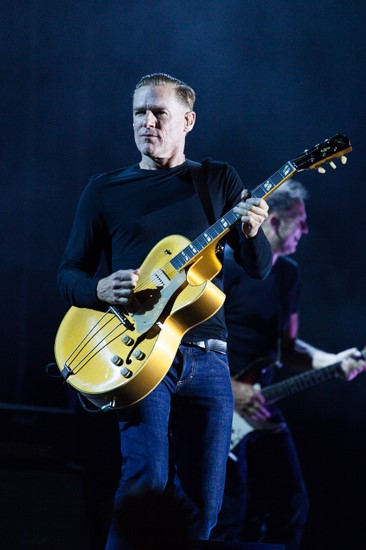
Bryan Adams

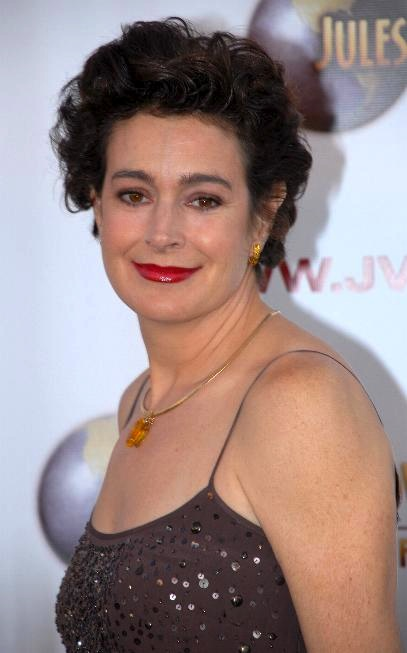
Sean Young

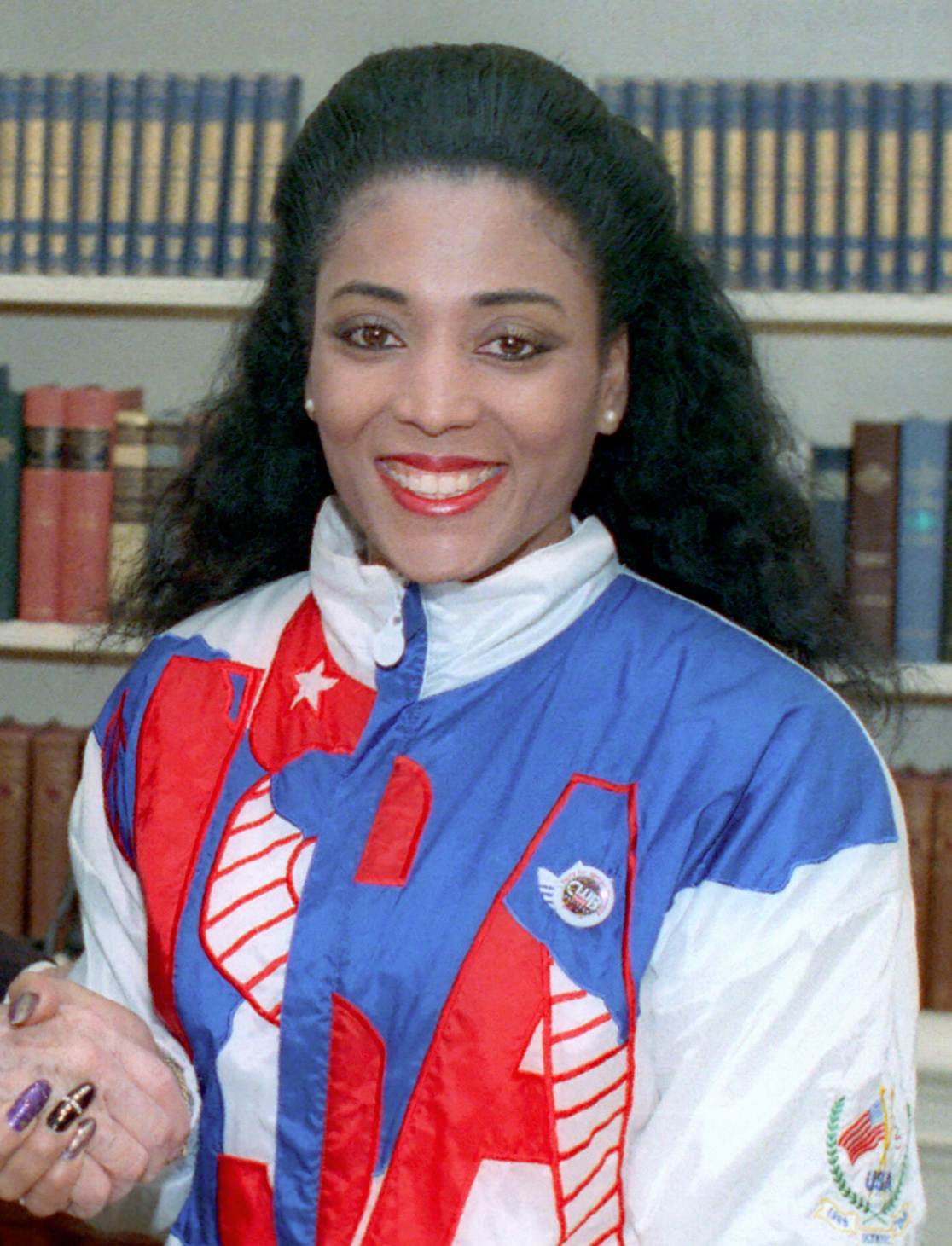
Florence Griffith Joyner

=== January ===
- January 1 – Azali Assoumani, President of the Comoros
- January 2 – Rajinder Gupta, Indian politician and industrialist
- January 4 – Vanity, Canadian singer and actress (d. 2016)
- January 5 – Clancy Brown, American actor
- January 9 – Rigoberta Menchú, Guatemalan recipient of the Nobel Peace Prize
- January 10 – Chris Van Hollen, American politician
- January 11 – Majed Abdullah, Saudi Arabian footballer
- January 16 – Sade, Nigerian-English singer
- January 17
  - Susanna Hoffs, American rock vocalist
  - Momoe Yamaguchi, Japanese singer
- January 20 – Joel Rifkin, American serial killer
- January 22 – Linda Blair, American actress
- January 24 – Kevin Magee, American basketball player (d. 2003)
- January 27 – Keith Olbermann, American news anchor and sportscaster
- January 30 – Jody Watley, African-American singer

=== February ===
- February 3 – Chan Santokhi, president of Suriname (d. 2026)
- February 5 – Jennifer Granholm, Canadian-American politician, 47th governor of Michigan (2003–2011)
- February 8 – Mauricio Macri, President of Argentina
- February 9 – Joachim Kunz, East German Olympic weightlifter
- February 13 – Benur Pashayan, Soviet Armenian Greco-Roman wrestler (d. 2019)
- February 14 – Renée Fleming, American soprano
- February 16 – John McEnroe, American tennis player
- February 18 – Jayne Atkinson, English-born American film, theatre and television actress
- February 22 – Kyle MacLachlan, American actor
- February 23 – Clayton Anderson, American astronaut
- February 26 – Rolando Blackman, Panamanian-American basketball player

=== March ===
- March 3 – Ira Glass, American radio personality
- March 4 – Irina Strakhova, Russian race walker
- March 5 – Vazgen Sargsyan, 8th Prime Minister of Armenia (d. 1999)
- March 6 – Tom Arnold, American actor and comedian
- March 7 – Donna Murphy, American actress and singer
- March 8 – Aidan Quinn, Irish-American actor
- March 9 – Takaaki Kajita, Japanese nuclear physicist, recipient of the Nobel Prize in Physics
- March 11 – Dejan Stojanović, Serbian-American poet, writer, essayist and businessman
- March 13 – Kathy Hilton, American socialite and philanthropist
- March 15 – Eliot Teltscher, American tennis player
- March 16 – Jens Stoltenberg, 27th Prime Minister of Norway
- March 17 – Danny Ainge, American basketball executive and player
- March 18
  - Luc Besson, French film producer, writer and director
  - Irene Cara, American singer and actress (d. 2022)
- March 21 – Nobuo Uematsu, Japanese composer
- March 22 – Matthew Modine, American actor
- March 26 – Catherine Keener, American actress
- March 28 – Laura Chinchilla, 49th president of Costa Rica
- March 29 – Perry Farrell, American singer, songwriter and musician
- March 30 – Andrew Bailey, executive director banking and chief cashier at the Bank of England

=== April ===
- April 2
  - Alberto Fernández, President of Argentina
  - Badou Ezzaki, Moroccan football player and manager
- April 3 – David Hyde Pierce, American actor
- April 7 – Rejoice Timire, Zimbabwean activist and politician (d. 2021)
- April 10 – Viviane Loschetter, Luxembourgish politician
- April 15
  - Emma Thompson, English actress
  - Debra Livingston, American Lawyer
  - Thomas F. Wilson, American actor
- April 16 – Alison Ramsay, Scottish field hockey player
- April 17 – Sean Bean, British actor
- April 21 – Robert Smith, lead vocalist of The Cure
- April 22 – Ryan Stiles, American-Canadian comedian
- April 24 – Paula Yates, British television presenter (d. 2000)
- April 26 – Pedro Pierluisi, Governor of Puerto Rico
- April 27
  - Sheena Easton, Scottish singer
  - Nicholas Kristof, American journalist and political commentator
- April 30
  - Stephen Harper, 22nd Prime Minister of Canada
  - Paul Gross, Canadian actor, producer, director and writer

=== May ===
- May 1 – Yasmina Reza, French playwright, actress, novelist and screenwriter
- May 3
  - Uma Bharti, Chief Minister of Madhya Pradesh
  - Ben Elton, British comedian and writer
- May 4 – Randy Travis, American singer
- May 9
  - Christian Bach, Argentine-Mexican actress and producer of telenovelas (d. 2019)
  - János Áder, President of Hungary
- May 10
  - Victoria Rowell, American actress
  - Cindy Hyde-Smith, US Senator
- May 12 – Ving Rhames, African-American actor
- May 14 – Patrick Bruel, French singer
- May 17 – Marcelo Loffreda, Argentine rugby player and coach
- May 20 – Israel Kamakawiwoʻole, Hawaiian singer (d. 1997)
- May 21 – Loretta Lynch, American politician, 83rd United States Attorney General
- May 22 – Morrissey, British singer
- May 23 – Bob Mortimer, English comedian, presenter, and actor
- May 24 – Pelle Lindbergh, Swedish-born hockey player (d. 1985)
- May 25 – Julian Clary, English actor, comedian, novelist and presenter
- May 27 – Donna Strickland, Canadian physicist, recipient of the Nobel Prize in Physics
- May 29
  - Rupert Everett, British actor
  - Gretchen, Brazilian singer and media personality

=== June ===
- June 7 – Mike Pence, American politician and former Vice President of the United States
- June 9 – Paul Graham, Canadian television producer
- June 10
  - Carlo Ancelotti, Italian football player and manager
  - Eliot Spitzer, American politician and governor of New York
- June 11 – Hugh Laurie, British actor, comedian and musician
- June 13
  - Klaus Iohannis, President of Romania
  - Jim Irsay, American businessman and former owner of the Indianapolis Colts (d. 2025)
- June 14 – Marcus Miller, American musician, composer and producer
- June 16 – James Brian Hellwig (The Ultimate Warrior), American professional wrestler and bodybuilder (d. 2014)
- June 17 – Ulrike Richter, German swimmer
- June 19
  - Anne Hidalgo, French politician, Mayor of Paris (2014–present)
  - Christian Wulff, Federal President of Germany
- June 21
  - Guerrinha, Brazilian basketball coach and basketball player
  - Marcella Detroit, American soprano vocalist, guitarist and songwriter
  - Louis Febre, Mexican composer
  - Kathy Mattea, American musician and activist
- June 22 – Wayne Federman, American comedian, actor and author
- June 24 – Andy McCluskey, English musician (OMD)
- June 27
  - Khadja Nin, Burundian singer and musician
  - Pétur Pétursson, Icelandic footballer
- June 29 – Gina Alajar, Filipino film and television actress and television director
- June 30 – Vincent D'Onofrio, American actor

=== July ===
- July 1
  - Mohamed Lemine Ould Guig, Mauritanian academic and political figure
  - Giovanni D'Aleo, Italian long-distance runner
- July 4 – Victoria Abril, Spanish actress and singer
- July 5
  - María Concepción Navarrete, Mexican politician
  - Marc Cohn, American singer-songwriter
- July 6 – Richard Dacoury, French basketball player
- July 7 – Barbara Krause, German swimmer
- July 8 – Mikhail Zingarevich, Russian entrepreneur and philanthropist
- July 9
  - Jim Kerr, Scottish rock singer (Simple Minds)
  - Kevin Nash, American professional wrestler
- July 11
  - Richie Sambora, American musician
  - Suzanne Vega, American singer
- July 12
  - King Tupou VI of Tonga
  - Charlie Murphy, African-American actor and comedian (d. 2017)
- July 14 – Susana Martinez, American politician, Governor of New Mexico
- July 15 – Vincent Lindon, French actor and filmmaker
- July 19 – Juan J. Campanella, Argentinian filmmaker
- July 20 – Giovanna Amati, Italian racing driver
- July 24 – Markus Graf, Swiss ice hockey player, coach, and executive
- July 25 – Fyodor Cherenkov, Russian footballer and manager (d. 2014)
- July 26 – Kevin Spacey, American actor
- July 29
  - Sanjay Dutt, Indian actor
  - Ruud Janssen, Dutch artist
  - John Sykes, British guitarist (d. 2024)
- July 30 − Abdullah of Pahang, sixteenth Yang di-Pertuan Agong of Malaysia

=== August ===
- August 3
  - John C. McGinley, American actor
  - Koichi Tanaka, Japanese scientist, recipient of the Nobel Prize in Chemistry
- August 5 – Pete Burns, English singer, songwriter and television personality (d. 2016)
- August 6 – Rajendra Singh, Indian water conservationist, Magsaysay Award (2001)
- August 7 – Koenraad Elst, Belgian Indologist
- August 10 – Rosanna Arquette, American actress
- August 11 – Gustavo Cerati, Argentinian singer (d. 2014)
- August 13 – Danny Bonaduce, American wrestler, actor and radio/television personality
- August 14
  - Marcia Gay Harden, American actress
  - Magic Johnson, African-American basketball player
  - Bill Hagerty, US Senator
- August 15 – Scott Altman, American astronaut
- August 17
  - Jonathan Franzen, American author
  - David Koresh, American spiritualist, leader of the Branch Davidian religious cult (d. 1993)
- August 18
  - Dorothy Bush Koch, American writer and philanthropist
  - Winona LaDuke, Native American environmentalist, author and activist
- August 21 – Liza Araneta Marcos, First Lady of the Philippines and lawyer
- August 25
  - Guglielmo Trinci, retired Italian professional baseball player
  - Sönke Wortmann, German film director
- August 26 – Stan Van Gundy, American basketball coach and TV commentator
- August 27
  - Juan Fernando Cobo, Colombian artist
  - Daniela Romo, Mexican singer, actress and TV hostess
- August 28 – Arthur Holden, Canadian actor and writer
- August 29
  - Rebecca De Mornay, American actress
  - Chris Hadfield, Canadian retired astronaut
- August 30 – Mark Jackson, Australian rules footballer and actor
- August 31 – Tony DeFranco, Canadian singer

=== September ===
- September 2 – Guy Laliberté, Canadian Cirque du Soleil founder
- September 4
  - Kevin Harrington, Australian actor
  - Armin Kogler, Austrian ski jumper
- September 6 – Gaetano Varcasia, Italian voice actor and theatre director (d. 2014)
- September 7
  - Pierre Nanterme, French business executive (d. 2019)
  - Drew Weissman, American biochemist, recipient of the Nobel Prize in Physiology or Medicine
- September 8
  - Daler Nazarov, Tajik composer, singer and actor
  - Kerry Kennedy, American human rights activist
- September 11 – John Hawkes, American actor
- September 12 – Sigmar Gabriel, German politician
- September 13
  - Kathy Johnson, American artistic gymnast
  - Chris Hansen, American journalist
- September 14
  - Morten Harket, Norwegian rock singer (A-ha)
  - Mary Crosby, American actress and daughter of Bing Crosby
- September 16 – Peter Keleghan, Canadian actor
- September 17 – Olivia Lozano, Venezuelan politician
- September 18
  - Ian Bridge, Canadian soccer player
  - Sérgio Britto, Brazilian singer and keyboardist
  - Mark Romanek, American director
  - Ryne Sandberg, American baseball player and manager (d. 2025)
- September 21
  - Dave Coulier, American comedian
  - Crin Antonescu, Acting President of Romania in 2012 and history teacher
- September 23
  - Jason Alexander, American actor and comedian
  - Elizabeth Peña, American actress (d. 2014)
- September 28 – Dantes Tsitsi, Nauruan politician
- September 29 – Jon Fosse, Norwegian Nynorsk novelist, dramatist and poet, recipient of the Nobel Prize in literature
- September 30
  - Ana Denicola, Uruguayan scientist
  - Ettore Messina, Italian basketball coach

=== October ===
- October 1 – Youssou N'Dour, Senegalese singer
- October 2 – Lena Hades, Russian artist
- October 3
  - Fred Couples, American golfer
  - Jack Wagner, American singer and actor
- October 4 – Chris Lowe, British musician
- October 5 – Maya Lin, American designer and artist
- October 6
  - Brian Higgins, American politician
  - Walter Ray Williams Jr., American professional bowler
  - Smash, American wrestler
  - Lai Ching-te, President of the Republic of China (Taiwan)
- October 7
  - Simon Cowell, English music producer and television talent show judge
  - Dylan Baker, American actor
- October 8
  - Erik Gundersen, Danish motorcycle racer
  - Carlos I. Noriega, Peruvian-American colonel and astronaut
- October 9
  - Bill Lee, American politician, 50th Governor of Tennessee
  - Boris Nemtsov, Russian politician (d. 2015)
- October 10
  - Kirsty MacColl, British singer-songwriter (d. 2000)
  - Julia Sweeney, American actress and comedian
  - Bradley Whitford, American actor and producer
- October 13 – Marie Osmond, American singer
- October 15
  - Emeril Lagasse, American chef and restaurant owner
  - Sarah Ferguson, British royal spouse
- October 17
  - Francisco Flores Pérez, President of El Salvador (d. 2016)
  - Norm Macdonald, Canadian comedian (d. 2021)
- October 18 – Mauricio Funes, 44th President of El Salvador (d. 2025)
- October 21 – Ken Watanabe, Japanese actor
- October 22 – Arto Salminen, Finnish writer (d. 2005)
- October 23
  - "Weird Al" Yankovic, American singer and parodist
  - Sam Raimi, American producer, writer and director
- October 24 – Michelle Lujan Grisham, American politician, governor and representative from New Mexico
- October 25 – Chrissy Amphlett, Australian rock singer (d. 2013)
- October 26
  - Evo Morales, President of Bolivia
  - Dimitris Tsiodras, Greek politician
- October 27 – Rick Carlisle, American basketball coach
- October 29 – John Magufuli, 5th President of Tanzania (d. 2021)
- October 31 – Neal Stephenson, American writer

=== November ===
- November 2 – Saïd Aouita, Moroccan athlete
- November 5 – Bryan Adams, Canadian singer and photographer
- November 10
  - Mackenzie Phillips, American actress
  - Mike McCarthy, American football coach
- November 11
  - Parithi Ilamvazhuthi, Indian politician (d. 2018)
  - Christian Schwarzenegger, Swiss legal scientist and professor
- November 14
  - Deta Hedman, Jamaican-born English darts player
  - Paul McGann, British actor
- November 18 – Jimmy Quinn, Northern Irish footballer
- November 19
  - Allison Janney, American actress
  - Rob Ashford, American stage director and choreographer
- November 20 – Sean Young, American actress
- November 23
  - Dominique Dunne, American actress (d. 1982)
  - Maxwell Caulfield, British actor
- November 25 – Charles Kennedy, British politician (d. 2015)
- November 26 – Sergey Golovkin, Russian serial killer and rapist (d. 1996)
- November 27 – Viktoria Mullova, Russian violinist
- November 28 – Judd Nelson, American actor
- November 29
  - Rahm Emanuel, American politician
  - Platon Lebedev, Russian executive
  - Neal Broten, American professional ice hockey player
- November 30
  - Cherie Currie, singer, musician, actress, and artist
  - Marie Currie, singer, songwriter, actress, and artist
  - Sylvia Hanika, German tennis player

=== December ===
- December 1 – Wally Lewis, Australian rugby league player
- December 3
  - Kathy Jordan, American tennis player
  - Eamonn Holmes, Northern Irish television presenter
- December 4 – Christa Luding-Rothenburger, German speed skater
- December 5 – Yoshitomo Nara, Japanese artist
- December 6 – Satoru Iwata, Japanese president of Nintendo (d. 2015)
- December 11 – Li Gui-min, Taiwanese politician
- December 13 – Johnny Whitaker, American actor
- December 14 – Evan Ziporyn, American composer
- December 15 – Betsy Arakawa, American classical pianist
- December 17 – Gregg Araki, American director
- December 19 – Waise Lee, Hong Kong actor
- December 20
  - Stephen Chan Chi Wan, general manager of TVB
  - Kazimierz Marcinkiewicz, 51st Prime Minister of Poland
- December 21 – Florence Griffith Joyner, American athlete (d. 1998)
- December 22 – Bernd Schuster, German footballer and manager
- December 24 – Lee Daniels, American director and producer
- December 25 – Michael P. Anderson, American astronaut (d. 2003)
- December 26
  - Glenna Cabello, Venezuelan political scientist
  - Hans Nielsen, Danish speedway rider
- December 28 – Ana Torroja, Spanish singer
- December 29
  - Marco Antonio Solís, Mexican singer
  - Patricia Clarkson, American actress
  - Paula Poundstone, American stand-up comedian
- December 30 – Tracey Ullman, British-American comedian and actress
- December 31
  - Val Kilmer, American actor (d. 2025)
  - Baron Waqa, Nauruan politician and composer, 14th President of Nauru

=== Full date unknown ===
- Paul Zgheib, Lebanese photographer
- Bernard Lavigne, French Judge
- Li Qiang, Premier of China since 2023
- Jorge Arroyo, Costa Rican writer
- Terry Smith, American sportsman
- Nina Hartley, American pornographic actress
- Peter Mullan, Scottish actor and filmmaker

== Deaths ==
=== January ===
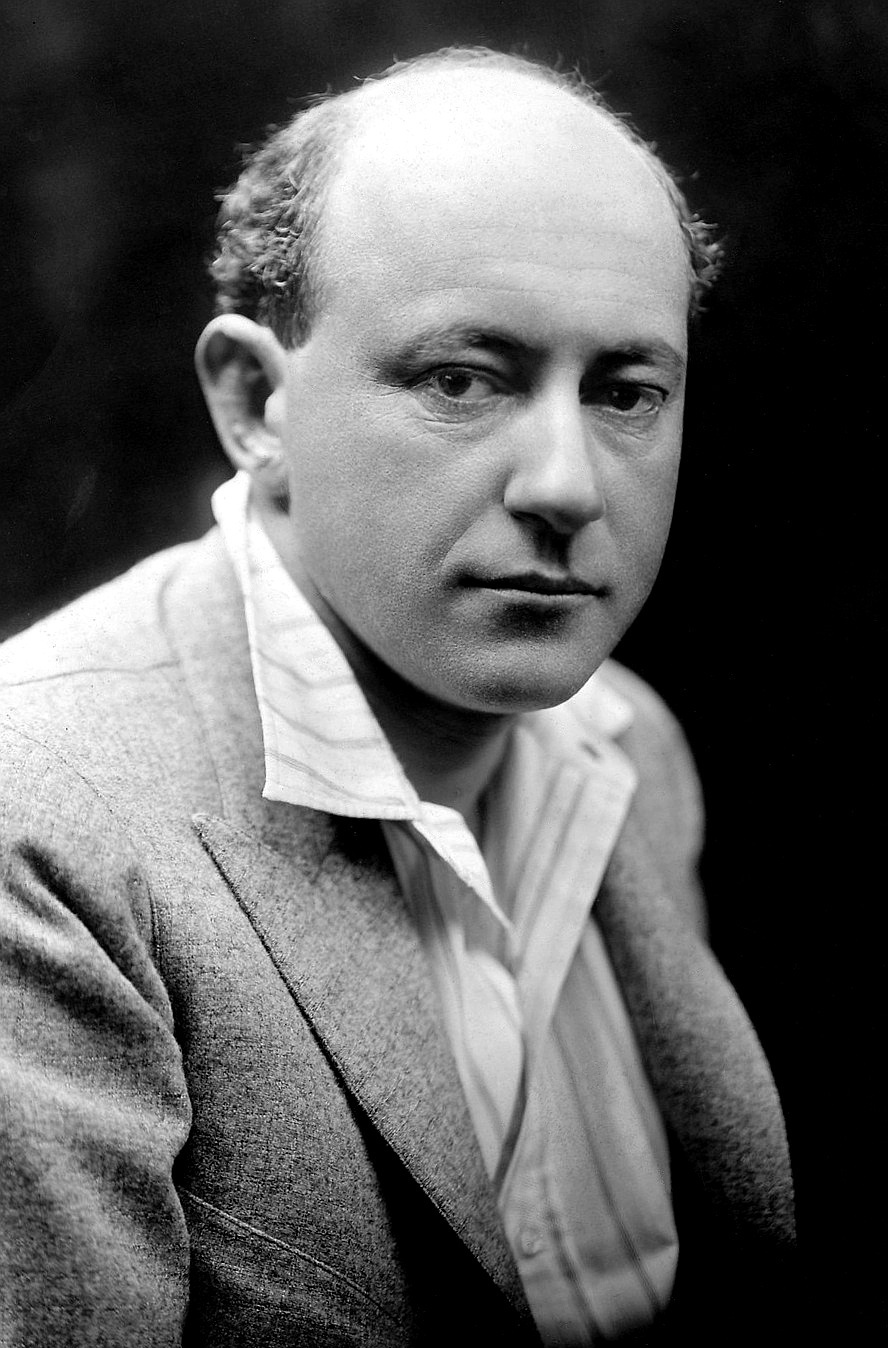
Cecil B. DeMille

- January 9 – Giuseppe Bottai, Italian Fascist journalist and politician (b. 1895)
- January 10 – Colin Gregory, Australian tennis player (b. 1903)
- January 14
  - Eivind Berggrav, Norwegian Lutheran bishop and reverend (b. 1884)
  - G. D. H. Cole, English political theorist, economist and historian (b. 1889)
- January 21
  - Cecil B. DeMille, American film director (b. 1881)
  - Frances Gertrude McGill, Canadian forensic pathologist (b. 1882)
  - Carl "Alfalfa" Switzer, American actor (b. 1927)
- January 22
  - Elisabeth Moore, American tennis champion (b. 1876)
  - Mike Hawthorn, English racing driver (b. 1929)

=== February ===
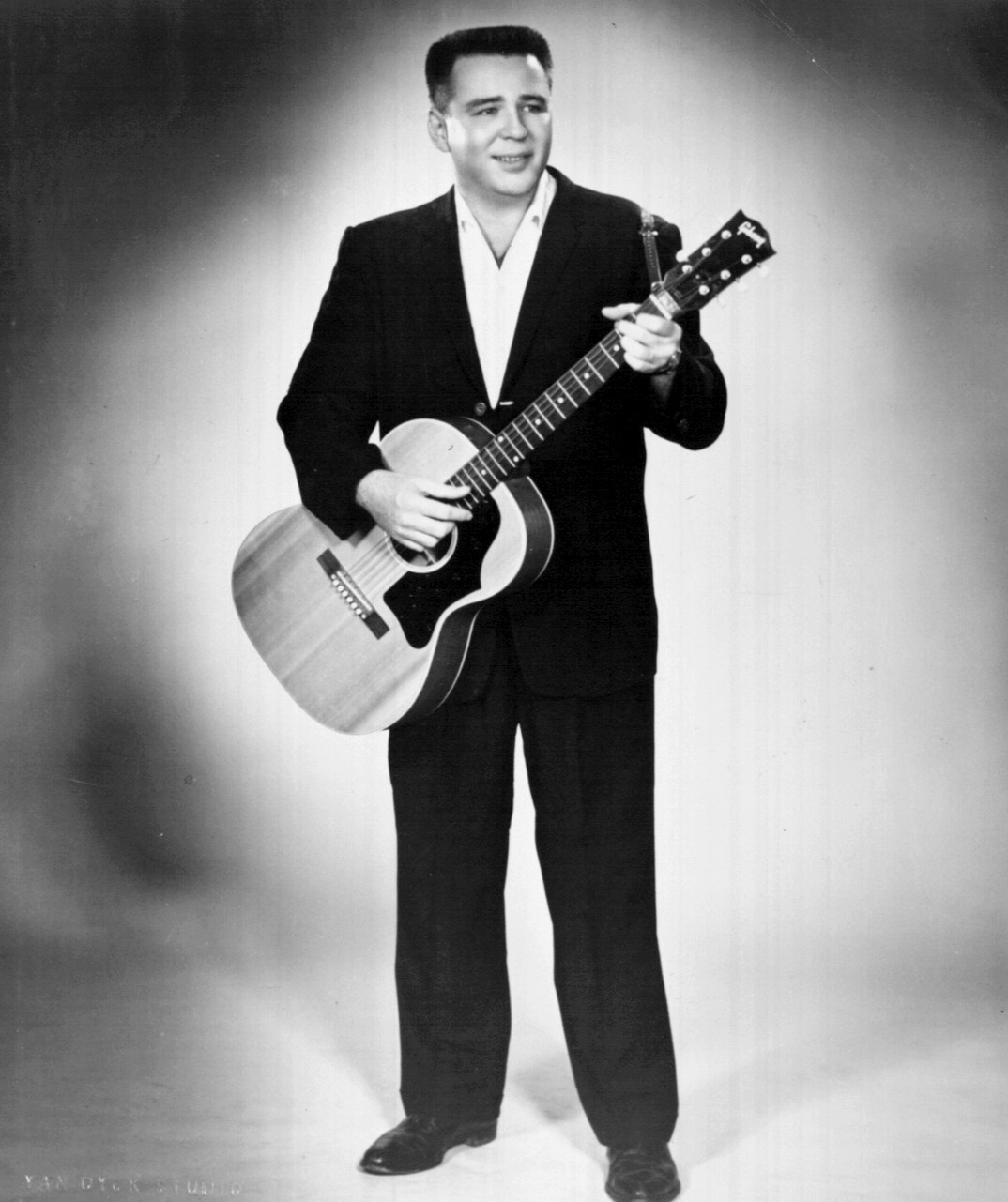
The Big Bopper

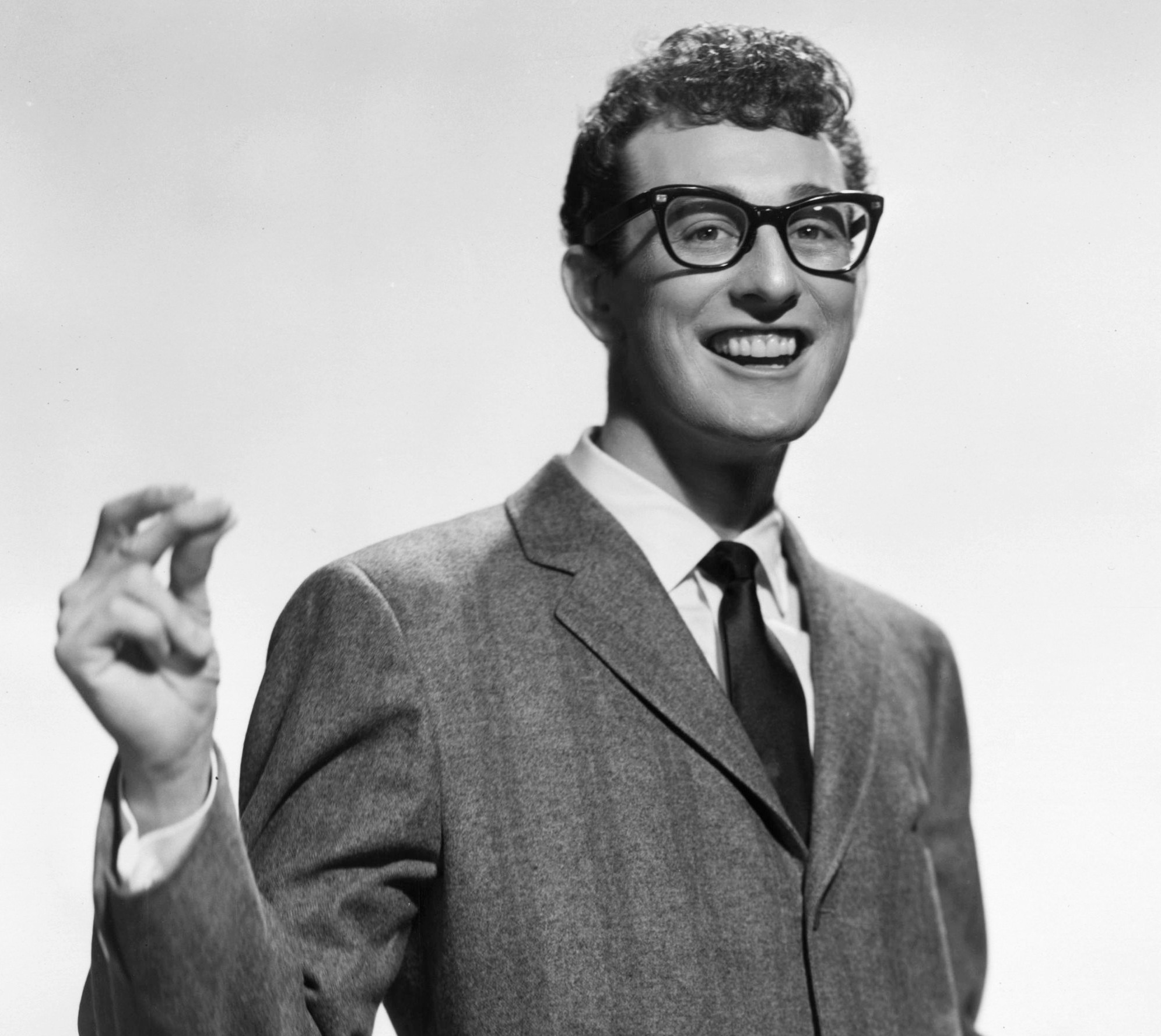
Buddy Holly

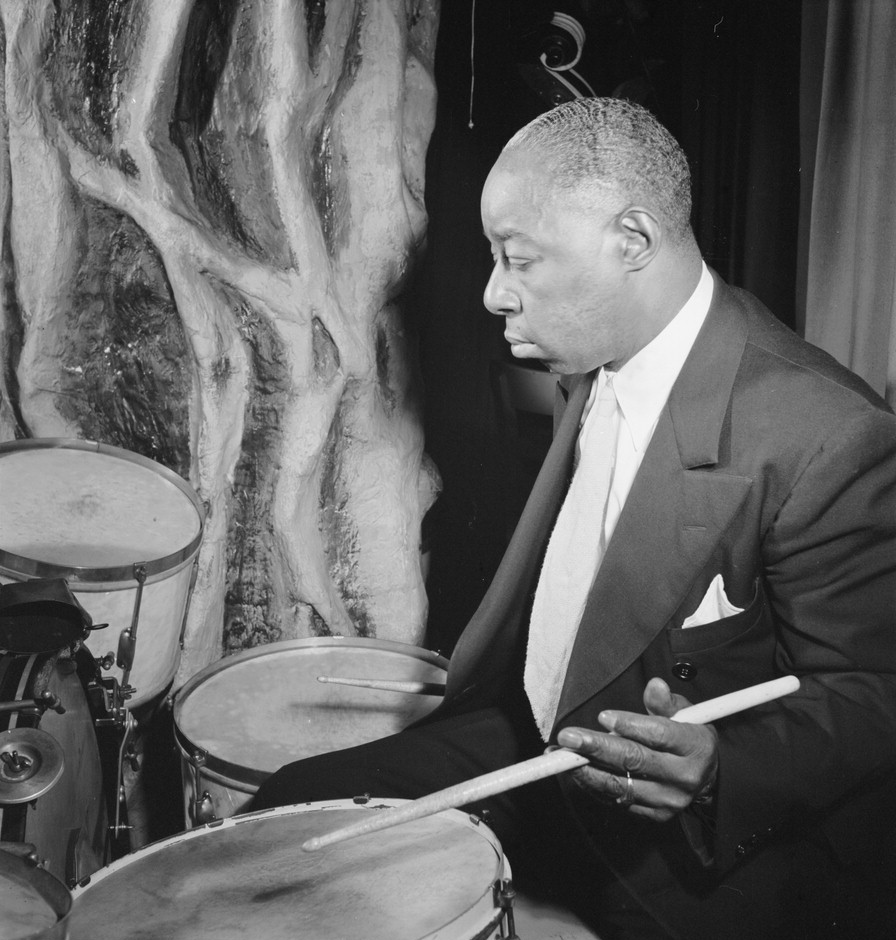
Baby Dodds

- February 3 – Killed in the crash of a private plane:
  - The Big Bopper (J.P. Richardson), American rock singer (b. 1930)
  - Buddy Holly, American rock singer (b. 1936)
  - Ritchie Valens, American rock singer (b. 1941)
- February 4 – Una O'Connor, Irish actress (b. 1880)
- February 7 – D. F. Malan, South African politician, 4th Prime Minister of South Africa (b. 1874)
- February 11 – Marshall Teague, American race car driver (b. 1921)
- February 12 – George Antheil, American composer (b. 1900)
- February 14 – Baby Dodds, American jazz musician (b. 1898)
- February 15 – Sir Owen Richardson, British physicist, Nobel Prize laureate (b. 1879)
- February 18 – Gago Coutinho, Portuguese aviation pioneer (b. 1869)
- February 22 – Helen Parrish, American actress (b. 1923)
- February 23 – Pierre Frieden, Luxembourgish politician and writer, 18th Prime Minister of Luxembourg (b. 1892)
- February 25 – Klawdziy Duzh-Dushewski, Soviet architect, diplomat and journalist (b. 1891)
- February 26
  - Princess Alexandra, 2nd Duchess of Fife, eldest grandchild of King Edward VII (b. 1891)
  - Kōtoku Satō, Japanese general (b. 1893)
- February 28
  - Maxwell Anderson, American screenwriter (b. 1888)
  - Beatrix Farrand, American gardener and architect (b. 1872)

=== March ===
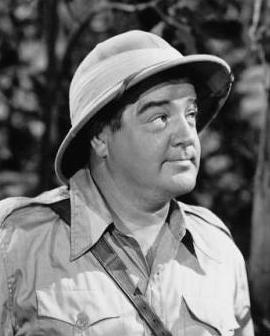
Lou Costello

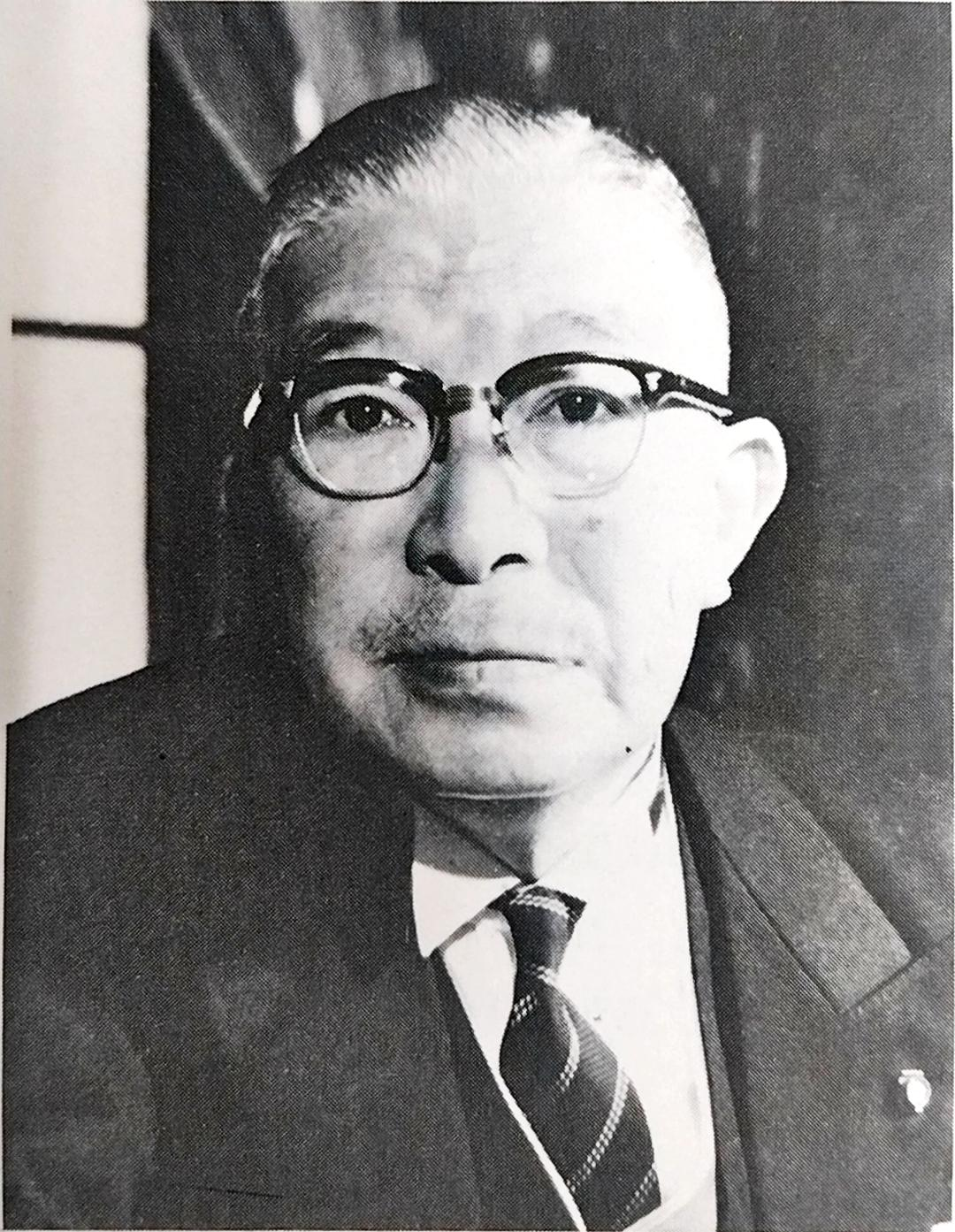
Ichirō Hatoyama

- March 1 – Mack Gordon, American composer and lyricist (b. 1904)
- March 2 – Eric Blore, English actor (b. 1887)
- March 3 – Lou Costello, American actor and comedian (b. 1906)
- March 4 – Maxie Long, American athlete (b. 1878)
- March 6
  - Guido Brignone, Italian actor (b. 1886)
  - Fred Stone, American actor (b. 1873)
- March 7 – Ichirō Hatoyama, Japanese politician, 36th Prime Minister of Japan (b. 1883)
- March 15
  - Shalva Dadiani, Soviet novelist (b. 1874)
  - Lester Young, American jazz saxophonist (b. 1909)
- March 17 – Galaktion Tabidze, Georgian poet (b. 1891)
- March 19 – Umberto Barbaro, Italian critic (b. 1902)
- March 23 – Dominick Trcka, Czechoslovak Roman Catholic priest and blessed (b. 1886)
- March 24 – Abd al-Rahman al-Mahdi, Sudanese political figure and religious leader, Imam of the Ansar and 1st Prime Minister of Sudan (b. 1885)
- March 26 – Raymond Chandler, American-born novelist (b. 1888)
- March 28 – Lyubov Golanchikova, Soviet pilot (b. 1889)
- March 29 – Barthélemy Boganda, 1st Prime Minister of the Central African Republic (b. 1910)

=== April ===
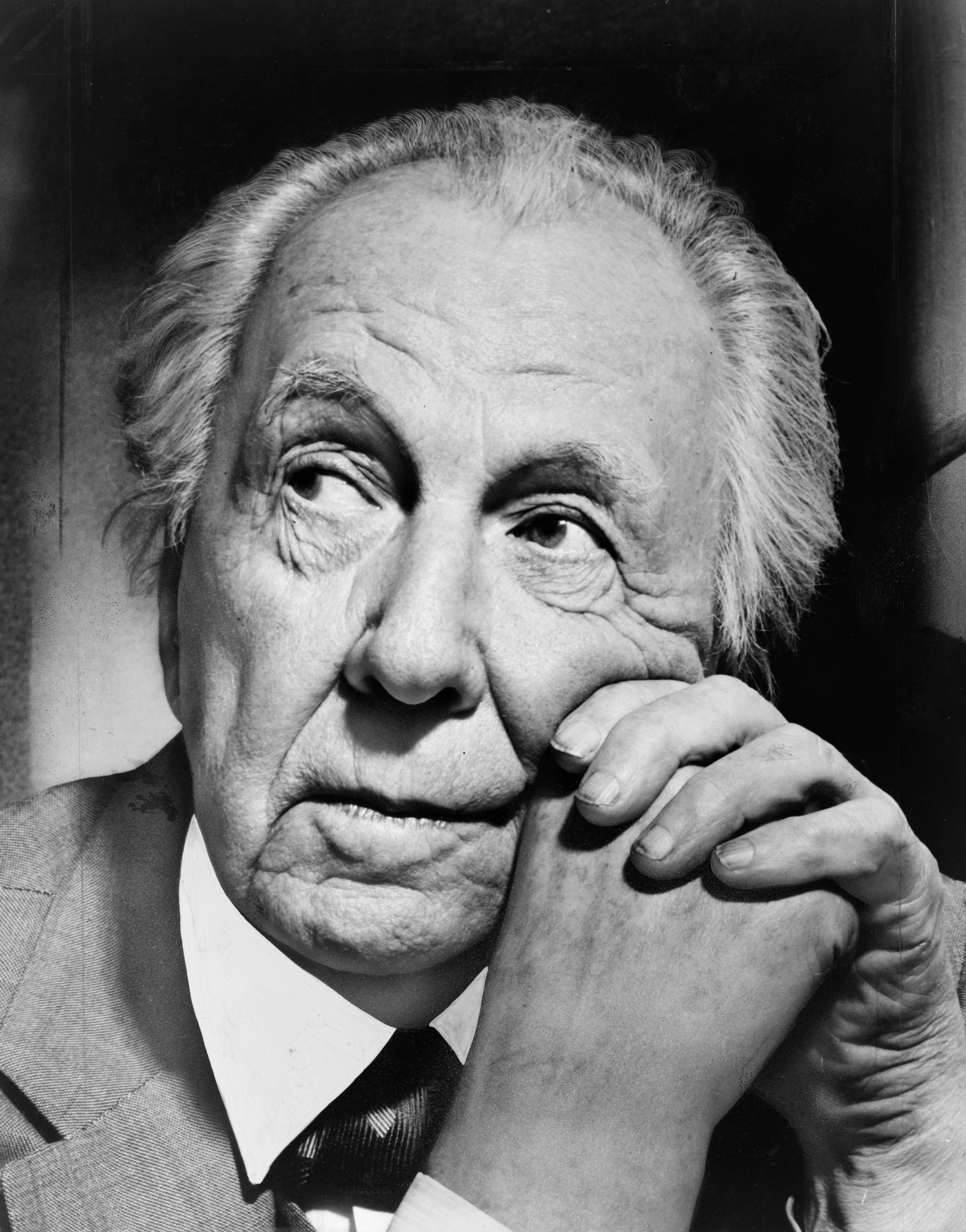
Frank Lloyd Wright

- April 2 – Nicholas Charnetsky, Soviet Orthodox priest, bishop, martyr and blessed (b. 1884)
- April 8 – Jonathan Zenneck, German physicist and electrical engineer (b. 1871)
- April 9 – Frank Lloyd Wright, American architect (b. 1867)
- April 18 – Irving Cummings, American actor (b. 1888)
- April 26 – Ki Hajar Dewantara, founder of Taman Siswa school, first Minister of Education of Indonesia (b. 1889)
- April 28 – María Guggiari Echeverría, Paraguayan Roman Catholic religious professed and venerable (b. 1925)
- April 29 – Sir Kenneth Anderson, British general (b. 1891)

=== May ===
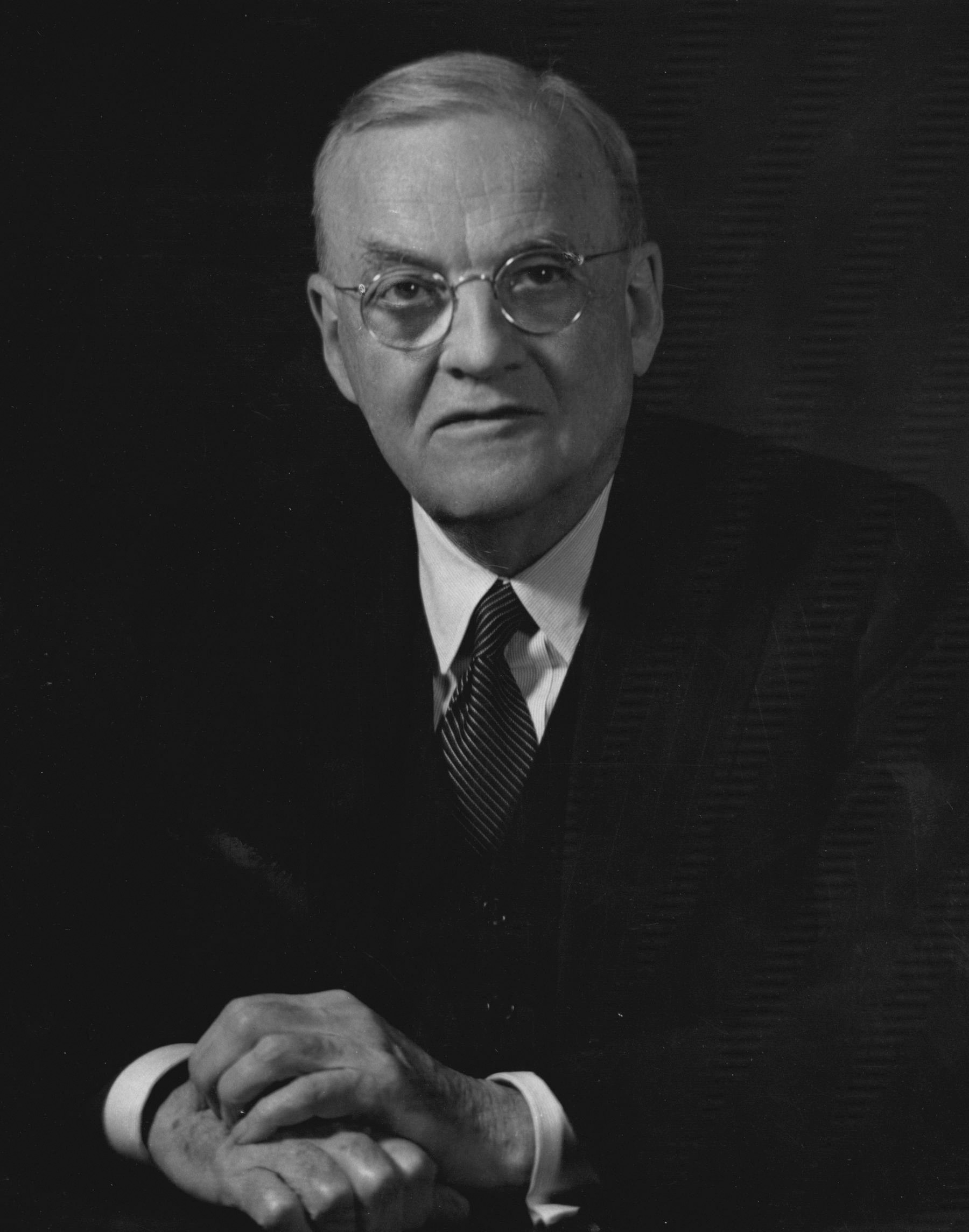
John Foster Dulles

- May 5
  - Georges Grente, French Roman Catholic cardinal and eminence (b. 1872)
  - Carlos Saavedra Lamas, Argentine politician, recipient of the Nobel Peace Prize (b. 1878)
- May 8
  - Renato Caccioppoli, Italian mathematician (b. 1904)
  - Ibrahim of Johor, Malaysian sultan (b. 1873)
- May 11 – Marcella Albani, Italian actress (b. 1899)
- May 14 – Sidney Bechet, American-born jazz saxophonist (b. 1897)
- May 17 – George Albert Smith, English film pioneer (b. 1864)
- May 18
  - Apsley Cherry-Garrard, Antarctic explorer (b. 1886)
  - Enrique Guaita, Argentinian footballer (b. 1910)
- May 20 – Alfred Schütz, Austrian sociologist (b. 1899)
- May 21 - Marie Denizard, French feminist, first woman to stand as a candidate in a French presidential election (b. 3 April 1872)
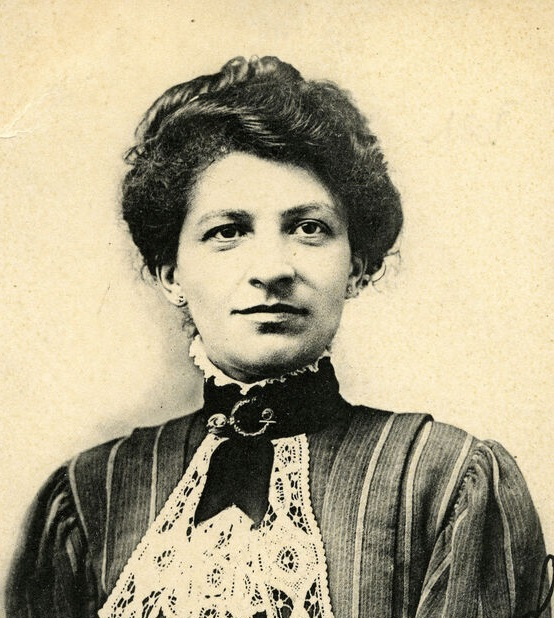
  Marie Denizard
- May 24 – John Foster Dulles, 52nd United States Secretary of State (b. 1888)
- May 29 – Ed Walsh, American baseball player (b. 1881)

=== June ===
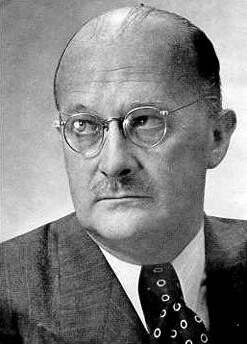
Adolf Otto Reinhold Windaus

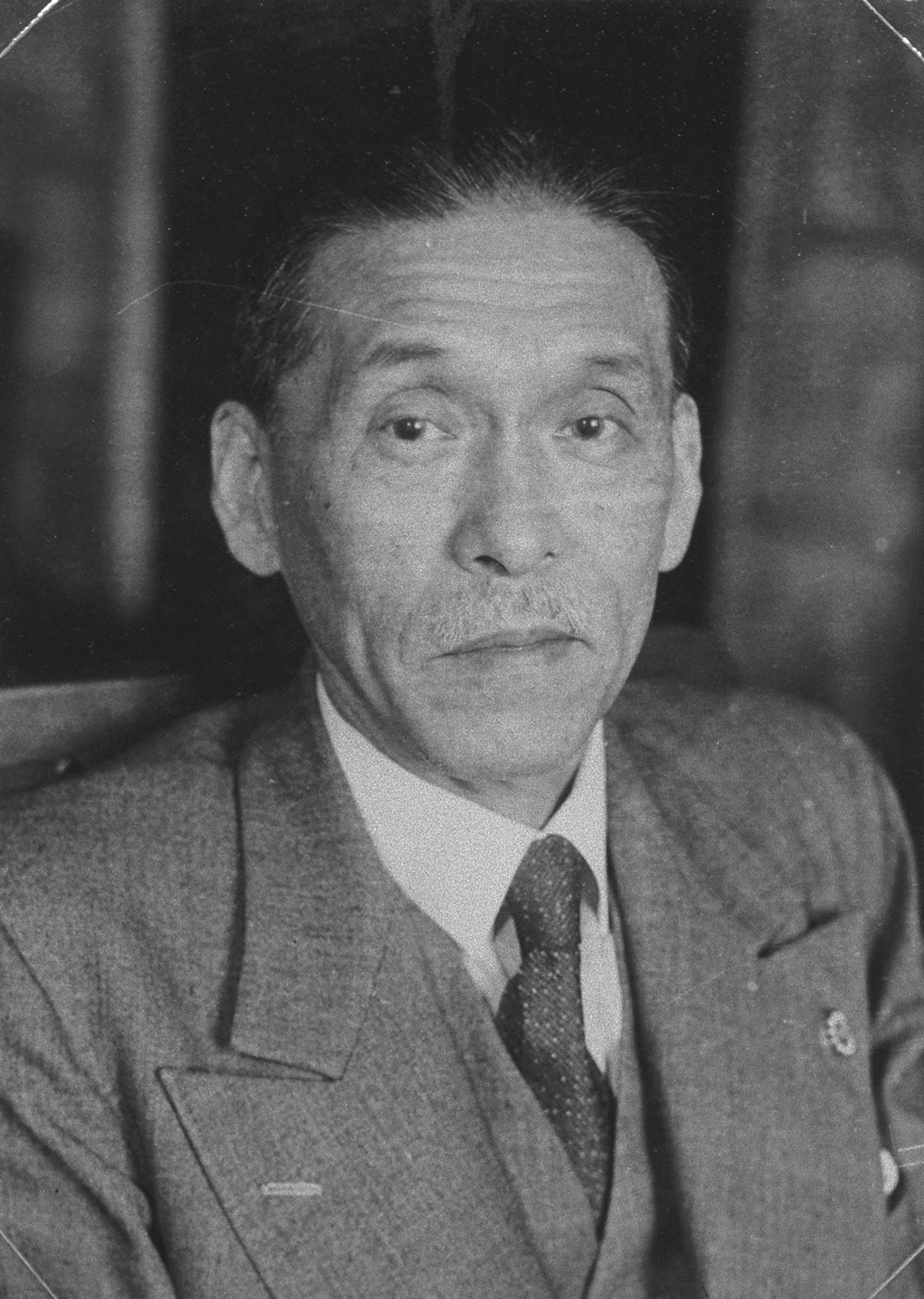
Hitoshi Ashida

- June 1 – Sax Rohmer, English author (b. 1883)
- June 4 – Charles Vidor, American director (b. 1900)
- June 8 – Pietro Canonica, Italian sculptor (b. 1869)
- June 9 – Adolf Windaus, German chemist, Nobel Prize laureate (b. 1876)
- June 13 – Seán Lester, Irish diplomat (b. 1888)
- June 14 – Jerónimo Méndez, Chilean politician, acting President of the Republic (b. 1887)
- June 15 – Kazimierz Bein, Polish ophthalmologist (b. 1872)
- June 16 – George Reeves, American television actor (b. 1914)
- June 18
  - Ethel Barrymore, American stage and screen actress (b. 1879)
  - Vincenzo Cardarelli, Italian poet (b. 1887)
- June 20
  - Hitoshi Ashida, Japanese politician, 34th Prime Minister of Japan (b. 1887)
  - Sir Ian Clunies Ross, Australian scientist (b. 1899)
- June 22 – Bruce Harlan, American Olympic diver (b. 1926)
- June 23
  - Cesare Maria De Vecchi, Italian soldier (b. 1884)
  - Boris Vian, French writer, poet, singer and musician (b. 1920)
- June 27
  - Elias, Duke of Parma (b. 1880)
  - Giovanni Pastrone, Italian actor, director and screenwriter (b. 1883)
- June 30 – José Vasconcelos, Mexican politician, writer and philosopher (b. 1882)

=== July ===
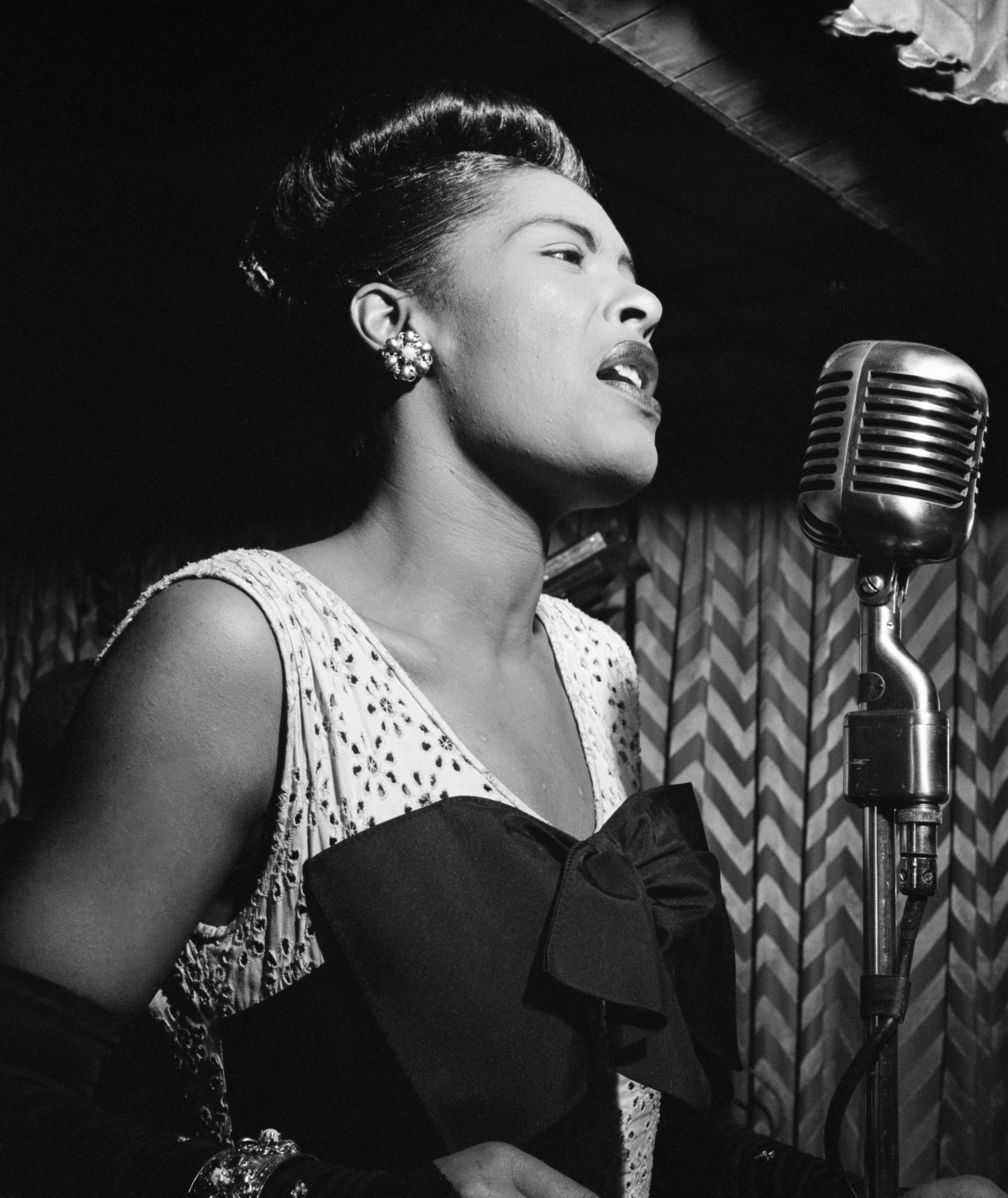
Billie Holiday

William D. Leahy

- July 2 – Sergei Chetverikov, Russian biologist (b. 1880)
- July 3 – Johan Bojer, Norwegian novelist and dramatist (b. 1872)
- July 6 – George Grosz, German artist (b. 1893)
- July 7
  - Hermenegildo Anglada Camarasa, Spanish painter (b. 1871)
  - Ernest Newman, English music critic (b. 1868)
- July 14 – Grock, Swiss clown (b. 1880)
- July 15
  - Ernest Bloch, Swiss-born American composer (b. 1880)
  - Agostino Gemelli, Italian Franciscan friar and reverend (b. 1878)
- July 17 – Billie Holiday, American singer (b. 1915)
- July 20 – William D. Leahy, American admiral (b. 1875)
- July 25
  - Yitzhak HaLevi Herzog, Polish-born Chief Rabbi of Ireland, and later of Israel (b. 1888)
  - King Mutara III of Rwanda (b. 1911)
- July 27 – Aleksandar Tsankov, 21st Prime Minister of Bulgaria (b. 1879)
- July 30 – María Natividad Venegas de la Torre, Mexican Roman Catholic nun and saint (b. 1868)

=== August ===
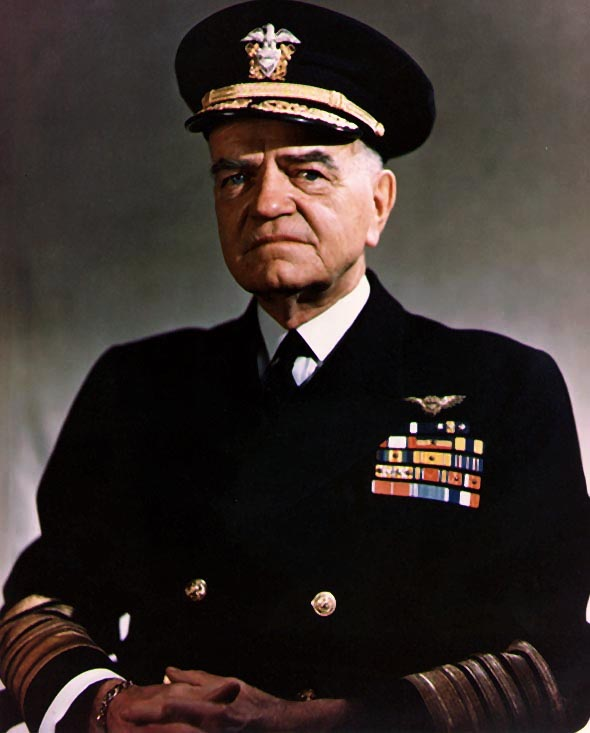
William Halsey Jr.

- August 4 – Ioan Bălan, Romanian Orthodox prelate (b. 1880)
- August 6 – Preston Sturges, American film director and writer (b. 1898)
- August 8
  - Albert Namatjira, Australian Aboriginal artist (b. 1902)
  - Luigi Sturzo, Italian Roman Catholic priest and politician (b. 1871)
- August 9 – Emil František Burian, Czechoslovak poet (b. 1904)
- August 16
  - William Halsey Jr., American US Navy Fleet admiral (b. 1882)
  - Wanda Landowska, Polish harpsichordist (b. 1879)
- August 19 – Blind Willie McTell, American Piedmont blues singer and guitarist (b. 1901)
- August 21 – Sir Jacob Epstein, American-born British sculptor (b. 1880)
- August 28
  - Raphael Lemkin, Polish lawyer (b. 1900)
  - Bohuslav Martinů, Czech composer (b. 1890)

=== September ===
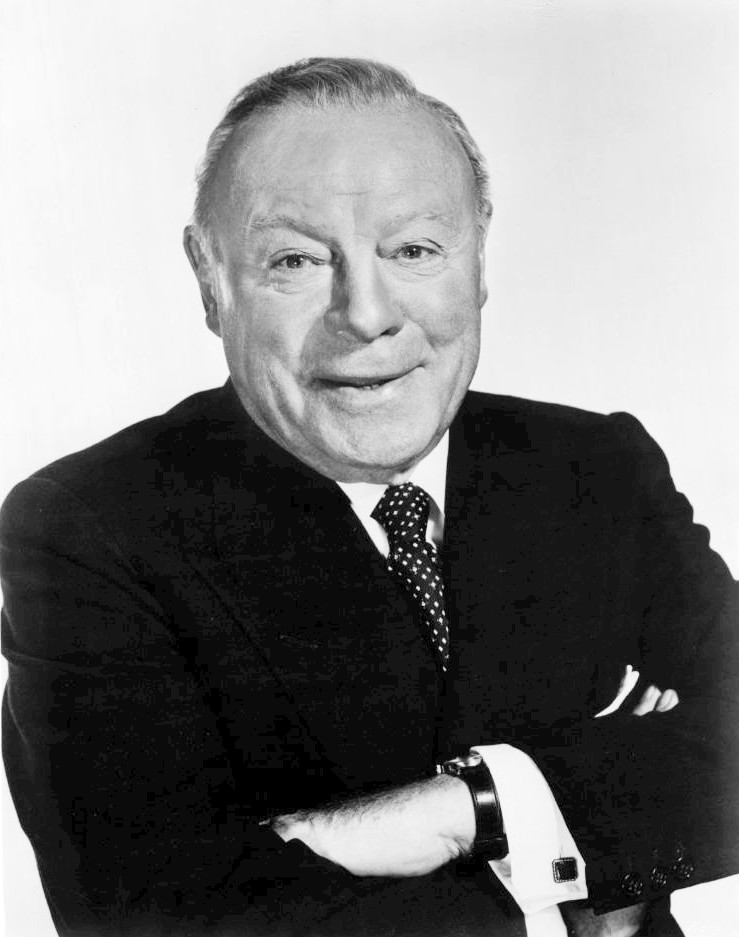
Edmund Gwenn

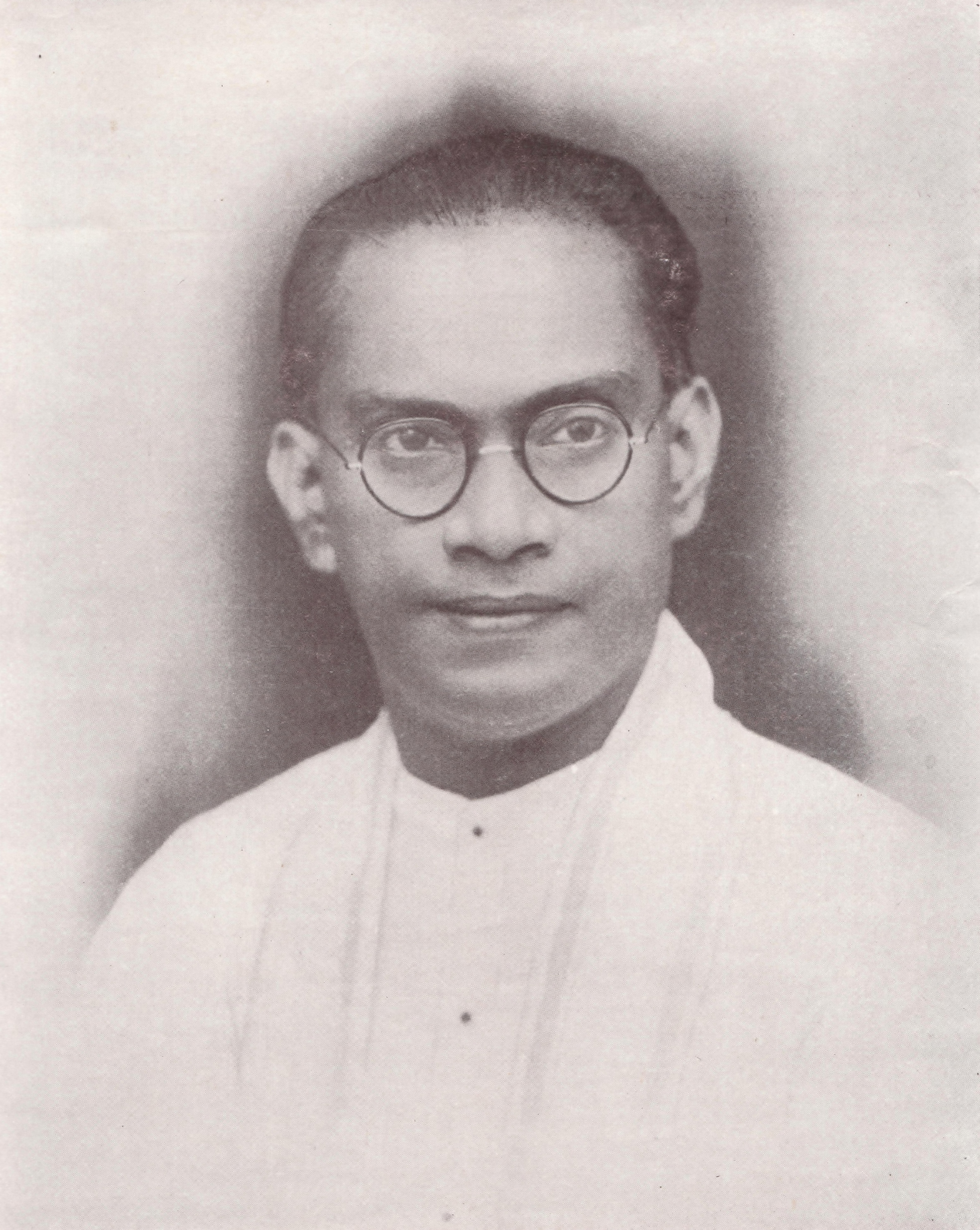
S. W. R. D. Bandaranaike

- September 6
  - Edmund Gwenn, English actor (b. 1877)
  - Kay Kendall, English actress (b. 1927)
- September 7 – Maurice Duplessis, Premier of Quebec (b. 1890)
- September 9 – Ramón Fonst, Cuban fencer (b. 1883)
- September 11 – Paul Douglas, American actor (b. 1907)
- September 14 – Wayne Morris, American actor (b. 1914)
- September 18 – Adolf Ziegler, German painter (b. 1892)
- September 20 – Nikandr Chibisov, Russian commander (b. 1892)
- September 22
  - Josef Matthias Hauer, Austrian composer and music theorist (b. 1883)
  - Edmund Ironside, 1st Baron Ironside, British field marshal (b. 1880)
- September 24 – Wolfgang Paalen, German-Austrian-Mexican painter, sculptor and art philosopher (b. 1905)
- September 25 – Helen Broderick, American actress (b. 1891)
- September 26 – S. W. R. D. Bandaranaike, 4th Prime Minister of Ceylon (b. 1899)
- September 28
  - Rudolf Caracciola, German racing driver (b. 1901)
  - Vinnie Richards, American tennis player (b. 1903)
- September 30 – Taylor Holmes, American actor (b. 1878)

=== October ===
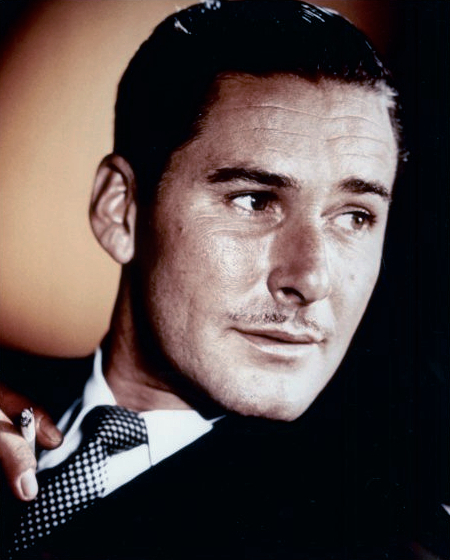
Errol Flynn

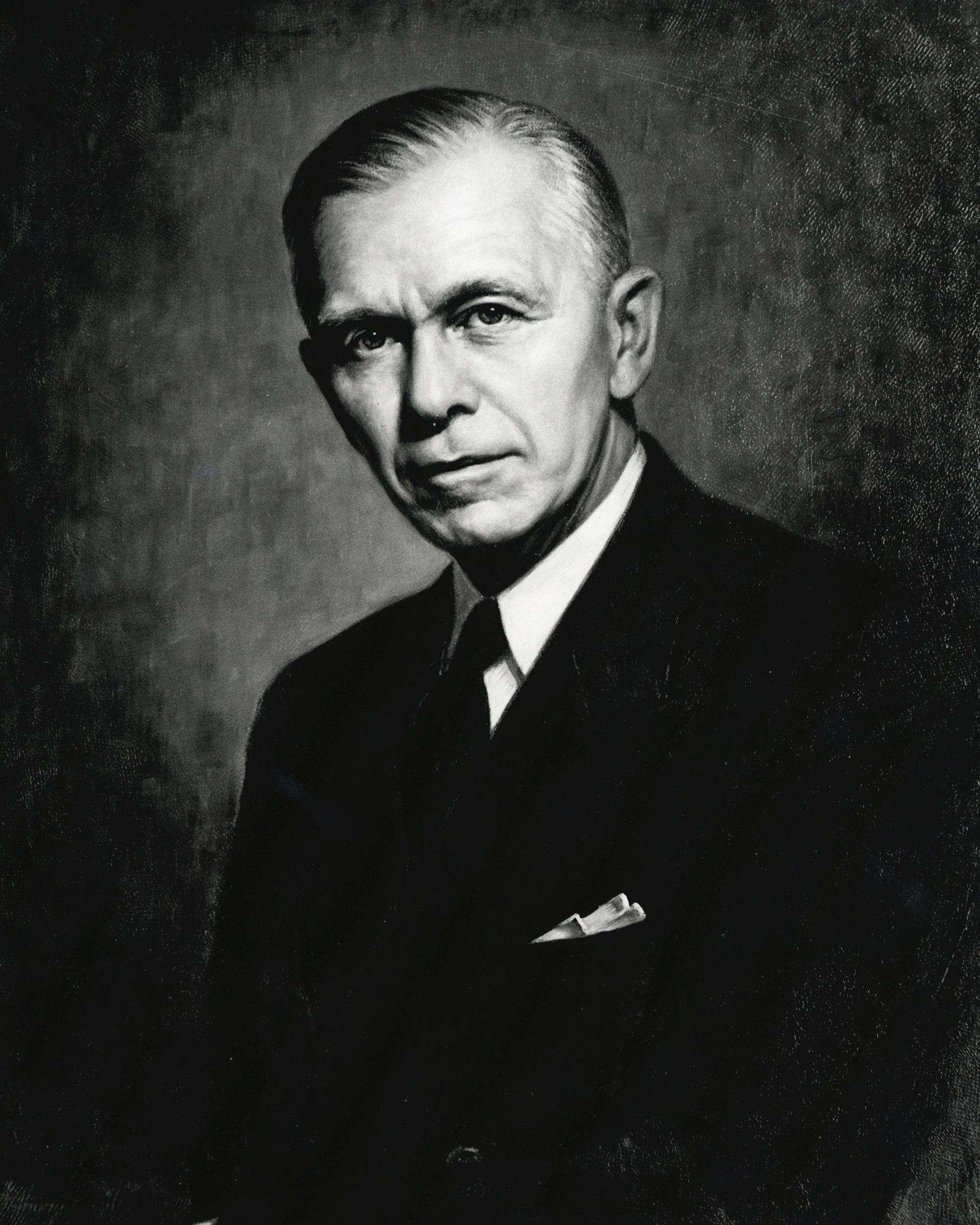
George Marshall

- October 1 – Enrico De Nicola, Italian jurist, politician and journalist, 1st President of Italy (b. 1877)
- October 3 – Sakiko Kanase, Japanese hostess, model, and teacher (b. 1935)
- October 6 – Bernard Berenson, American art historian (b. 1865)
- October 7 – Mario Lanza, American tenor (b. 1921)
- October 9 – Shirō Ishii, Japanese microbiologist and lieutenant general of Unit 731 (b. 1892)
- October 14 – Errol Flynn, Australian actor (b. 1909)
- October 15 – Stepan Bandera, Ukrainian nationalist leader (b. 1909)
- October 16 – George C. Marshall, United States Secretary of State, recipient of the Nobel Peace Prize (b. 1880)
- October 18 – Boughera El Ouafi, Algerian athlete (b. 1903)
- October 19 –
  - Ebrahim Hakimi, 29th Prime Minister of Iran (b. 1869)
  - Josef Hoop, Prime Minister of Liechtenstein (b. 1895)
- October 20 – Werner Krauss, German actor (b. 1884)
- October 22 – Joseph Cahill, Australian politician (b. 1891)
- October 28 – Camilo Cienfuegos, Cuban revolutionary (b. 1932)
- October 29 – King Sisavang Vong of Laos (b. 1885)

=== November ===
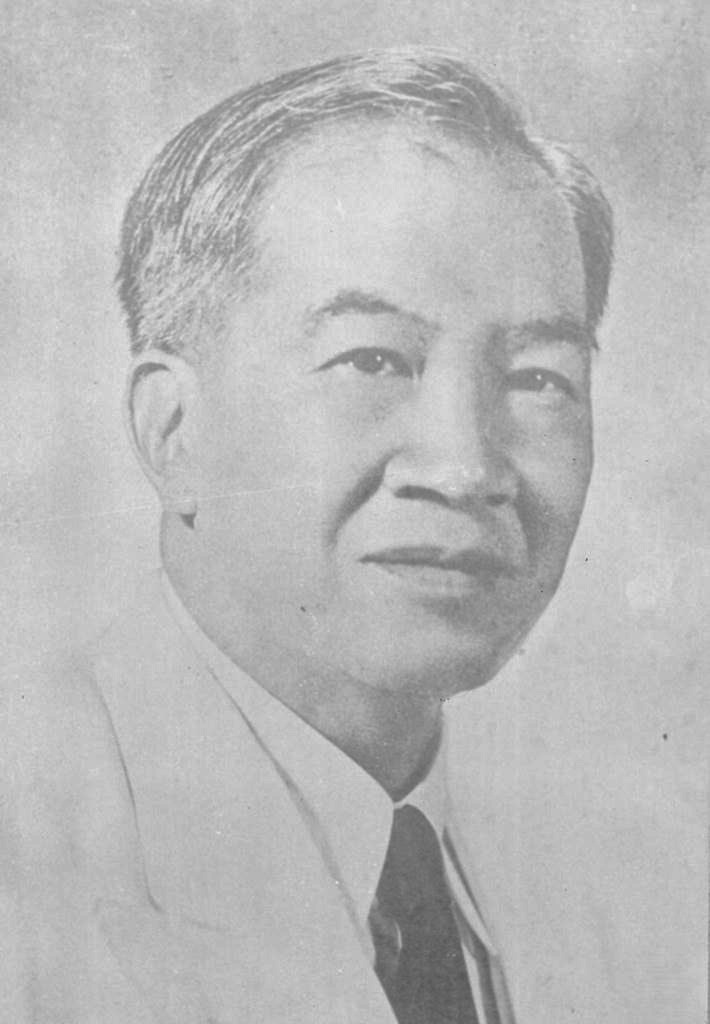
Jose P. Laurel

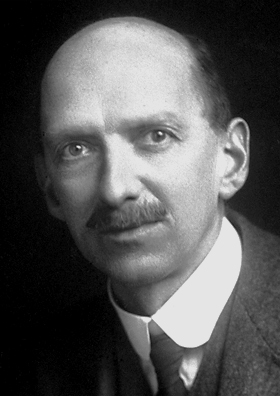
Charles Thomson Rees Wilson

- November 1 – Zhang Jinghui, Chinese general and politician, Prime Minister of Manchukuo (b. 1871)
- November 2 – Federico Tedeschini, Italian Roman Catholic cardinal and eminence (b. 1873)
- November 4
  - George of Drama, Greek Orthodox priest, elder and saint (b. 1901)
  - Friedrich Waismann, Austrian mathematician, physicist and philosopher (b. 1896)
- November 6
  - José P. Laurel, Filipino politician and judge, 3rd President of the Philippines (b. 1891)
  - Ivan Leonidov, Russian architect (b. 1902)
- November 7 – Victor McLaglen, English actor and boxer (b. 1886)
- November 10 – Lupino Lane, British actor (b. 1892)
- November 15 – Charles Thomson Rees Wilson, Scottish physicist, Nobel Prize laureate (b. 1869)
- November 17 – Heitor Villa-Lobos, Brazilian composer (b. 1887)
- November 20 – Alfonso López Pumarejo, 2-time President of Colombia (b. 1886)
- November 21 – Max Baer, American boxer and actor (b. 1909)
- November 22 – Molla Mallory, American tennis champion (b. 1884)
- November 24
  - Stepan Erzia, Russian sculptor (b. 1876)
  - Ion Gigurtu, 42nd Prime Minister of Romania (b. 1886)
- November 25 – Gérard Philipe, French actor (b. 1922)

=== December ===
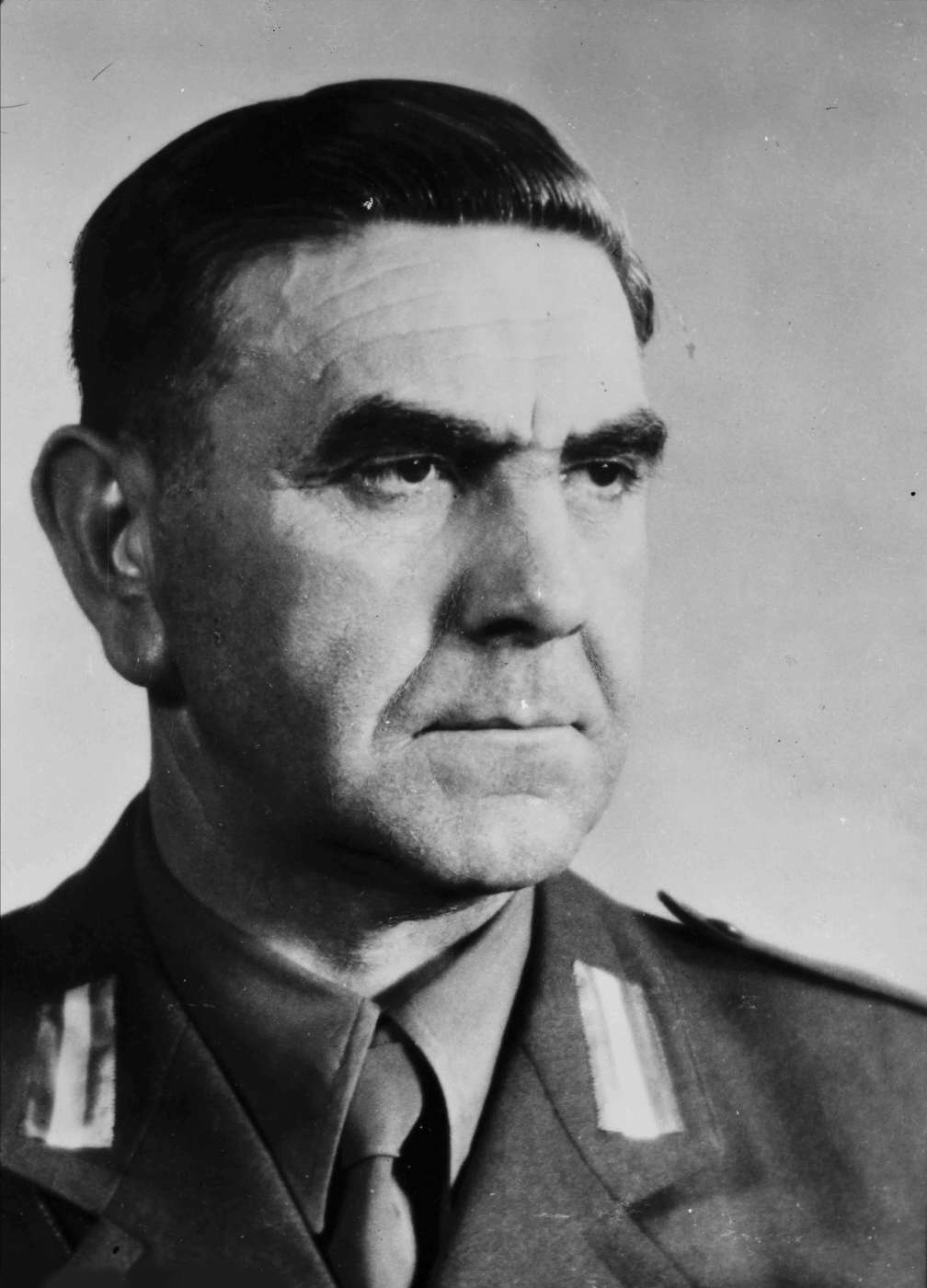
Ante Pavelić

- December 3 – Juozapas Skvireckas, Soviet Orthodox archbishop and reverend (b. 1873)
- December 4 – Hubert Marischka, Austrian film director (b. 1882)
- December 7
  - Charlie Hall, English actor (b. 1899)
  - Prince Kuni Asaakira (b. 1901)
- December 11 – Jim Bottomley, American baseball player (b. 1900)
- December 14 – Stanley Spencer, British painter (b. 1891)
- December 19 – Andrés Martínez Trueba, 31st President of Uruguay (b. 1884)
- December 22 – Gilda Gray, Polish-born dancer and actress (b. 1901)
- December 23 – Edward Wood, 1st Earl of Halifax, British politician (b. 1881)
- December 28 – Ante Pavelic, Croatian fascist leader and WWII war criminal (b. 1889)

=== Unknown ===
- Al-Abbas ibn Ibrahim as-Samlali, Moroccan historian (b. 1877)
- Elena Săcălici, Romanian artistic gymnast (b. 1935)

== Nobel Prizes ==

- Physics – Emilio Gino Segrè, Owen Chamberlain
- Chemistry – Jaroslav Heyrovský
- Physiology or Medicine – Severo Ochoa, Arthur Kornberg
- Literature – Salvatore Quasimodo
- Peace – Philip Noel-Baker
