= List of Shinto shrines in the United States =

This is a list of Shinto shrines in the United States, including demolished shrines.

== United States ==
Shrine name	Location	Enshrined deity
California
Shinto Shrine of Shusse Inari in America (アメリカ出世稲荷神社)	Los Angeles	(宇迦之御魂神) Uka-no-Mitama-no-Kami (誉田別命) Homudawake-no-Mikoto (大床主神) Ōtokonushi-no-kami (武みかづちの神) Takemikaduchi-no-kami (経津主神) Futsunushi-no-kami (水波女神) Mizuhanome-no-kami
San Pedro Daijingū (サンピドロ大神宮)	Los Angeles	
Colorado
Kami Shrine (Drala Mountain Center)	Red Feather Lakes	Amaterasu-Ōmikami (天照大神), Toyouke-Omikami, Sarutahiko-no-Ōkami, Ame-no-Uzume-no-Mikoto (猿田彦大神・天鈿女命)
Florida
Kannagara Inari Salon and Kannagara Chikyu Jinja (神長柄稲荷サロンと神長柄地球神社)	Kissimmee	(稲荷大神) Inari Ōkami
Hawaii
Daijingū Temple of Hawaii (ハワイ大神宮)	Honolulu	(天照皇大神) Amaterasu-Sume-Ōkami (天之御中主神) Amenominakanushi-no-Kami (ジョージ・ワシントン) George Washington (エイブラハム・リンカーン) Abraham Lincoln (カメハメハ1世) King Kamehameha (カラカウア) King Kalakaua
Hawaii Ishizuchi Jinja (ハワイ石鎚神社)	Honolulu	Ishizuchi-Hiko-no-Mikoto (石鎚毘古命)
Hawaii Kotohira Jinsha – Hawaii Dazaifu Tenmangu (ハワイ金刀比羅神社・ハワイ太宰府天満宮)	Honolulu	Ōmononushi-no-Mikoto, Sugawara-no-Michizane-kō (大物主命・菅原道真公)
Hilo Daijingū (ヒロ大神宮)	Hilo	Amaterasu-Sume-Ōkami, Toyouke-no-Ōkami (天照皇大神・豊受大神)
Izumo Taishakyo Mission of Hawaii (ハワイ出雲大社)	Honolulu	Ōkuninushi-no-Ōkami, Hawaiubusunagami (大國主大神・ハワイ産土神)
Maalaea Ebisu Kotohira Jinsha (マラエア恵比須金刀比羅神社)	Maalaea	Ebisu (恵比須)
Maui Jinsha Mission (マウイ神社)	Wailuku	
Wakamiya Inari Shrine (若宮稲荷神社)	Waipahu	Inari Ōkami (稲荷大神)
Washington
Tsubaki Grand Shrine of America (アメリカ椿大神社)	Granite Falls	Sarutahiko-no-Ōkami, Ame-no-Uzume-no-Mikoto (猿田彦大神・天鈿女命),

== United States territories ==
Shrine name	Location	Enshrined deity
Northern Mariana Islands
Saipan Katori Jinja 彩帆香取神社)	Garapan, Saipan	Futsunushi-no-kami (経津主神)
Saipan Hachiman Jinja (彩帆八幡神社)	Kagman, Saipan	Saipan-Kunitama-no-Ōkami (サイパン国魂大神), Hachiman-Ōkami (八幡大神), Isaizu-Ōkami (久伊豆大神)

== See also ==
- Shinto
- Shinto shrine
- List of Shinto shrines
- Overseas Shinto
- Buddhist Churches of America
- Honpa Hongwanji Mission of Hawaii
- Hawaii Shingon Mission
- Gedatsu Church of America
- List of Buddhist temples in the United States
