= Japanese migration to Indonesia =

Japanese people in Indonesia Japanese Indonesians インドネシアの日本人 / 日系インドネシア人 Orang Jepang di Indonesia
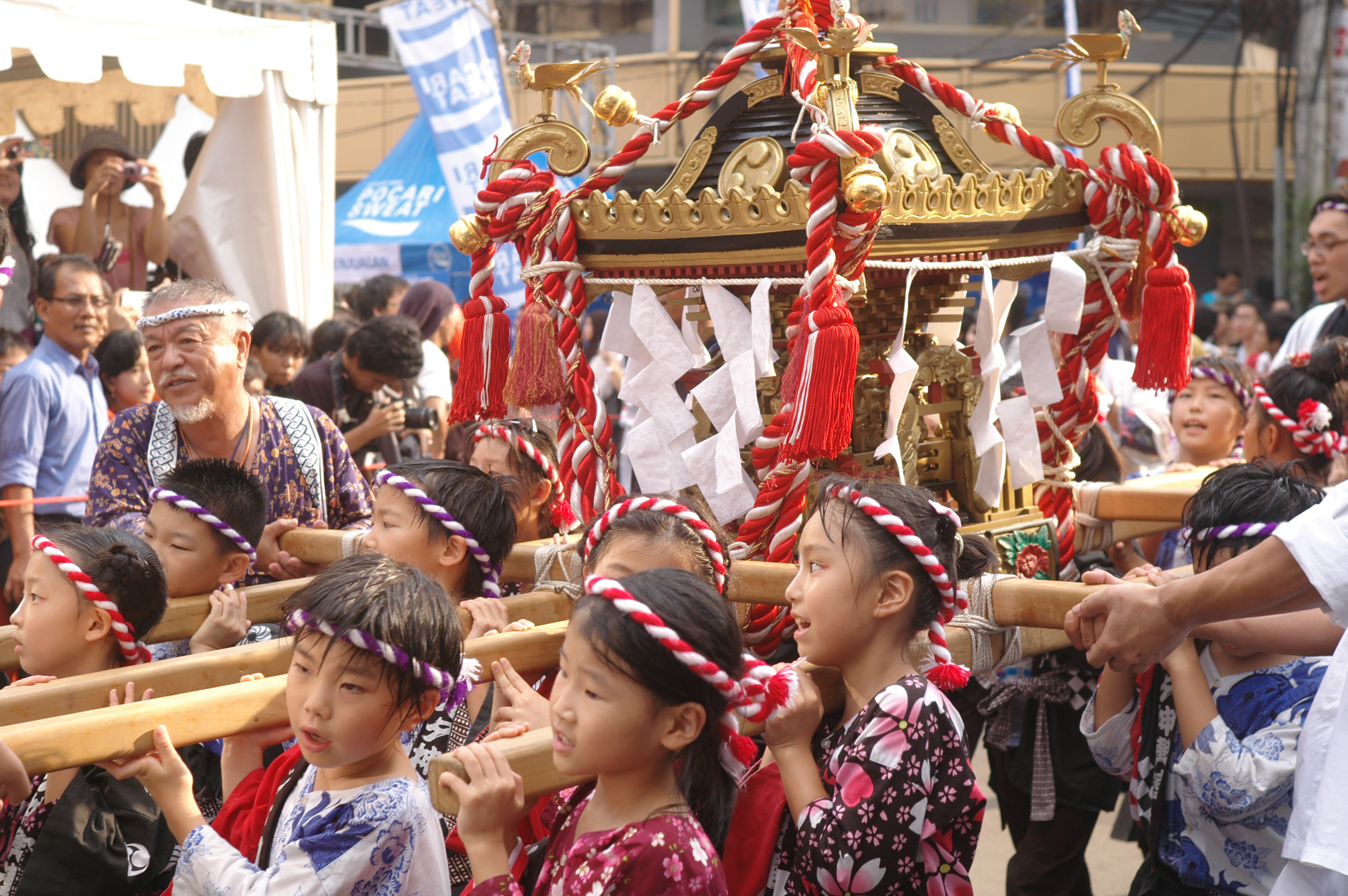
- Mikoshi Parade (Mikoshi Kids) festival in Blok M, South Jakarta, Indonesia.

Total population
- 14,984 (2024)

Regions with significant populations
- Jakarta metropolitan area, Cikarang, Bali, East Java (Surabaya, Banyuwangi Regency), Medan, Semarang

Languages
- Japanese and Indonesian

Related ethnic groups
- Japanese diaspora
- The population figure quoted includes Japanese nationals only.

Large-scale Japanese migration to Indonesia dates back to the late 19th century, though there was limited trade contact between Japan and Indonesia as early as the 17th century. In October 2009, there were about 11,263 Japanese expatriates in Indonesia. At the same time, there are also identifiable populations of descendants of early migrants, who may be referred to as Nikkei Indonesians or Indonesian Nikkei.

== Migration history ==
Prior to the Tokugawa shogunate's establishment of their isolationist sakoku policy, the Dutch East India Company (VOC) were known to use Japanese mercenaries to enforce their rule in the Maluku Islands. One of Indonesia's early residents of Japanese descent was Saartje Specx, the daughter of Dutch colonial governor Jacques Specx, who ruled Batavia (present-day Jakarta) from 1629 to 1632. 1898 colonial government statistics showed 614 Japanese in the Dutch East Indies (166 men, 448 women).

The Japanese mercenaries have also aided the Dutch East India company on their conquest of the Banda Islands. Atrocities are committed against the locals of the island by both the Mercenaries and the soldiers of Dutch East India company.

As the Japanese population grew, a Japanese consulate was established in Batavia in 1909, but for the first several years its population statistics were rather haphazard. Their reports showed 782 registered Japanese migrants in Batavia in 1909 (with estimates that there were another 400 unregistered), and 278 (57 men, 221 women) in Medan in 1910. Between ca. 1872 and 1940 large numbers of Japanese prostitutes (karayuki-san) worked in brothels of the archipelago. Beginning in the late 1920s, Okinawan fishermen began to settle in north Sulawesi. There was a Japanese primary school at Manado, which by 1939 had 18 students. In total, 6,349 Japanese people lived in Indonesia by 1938.

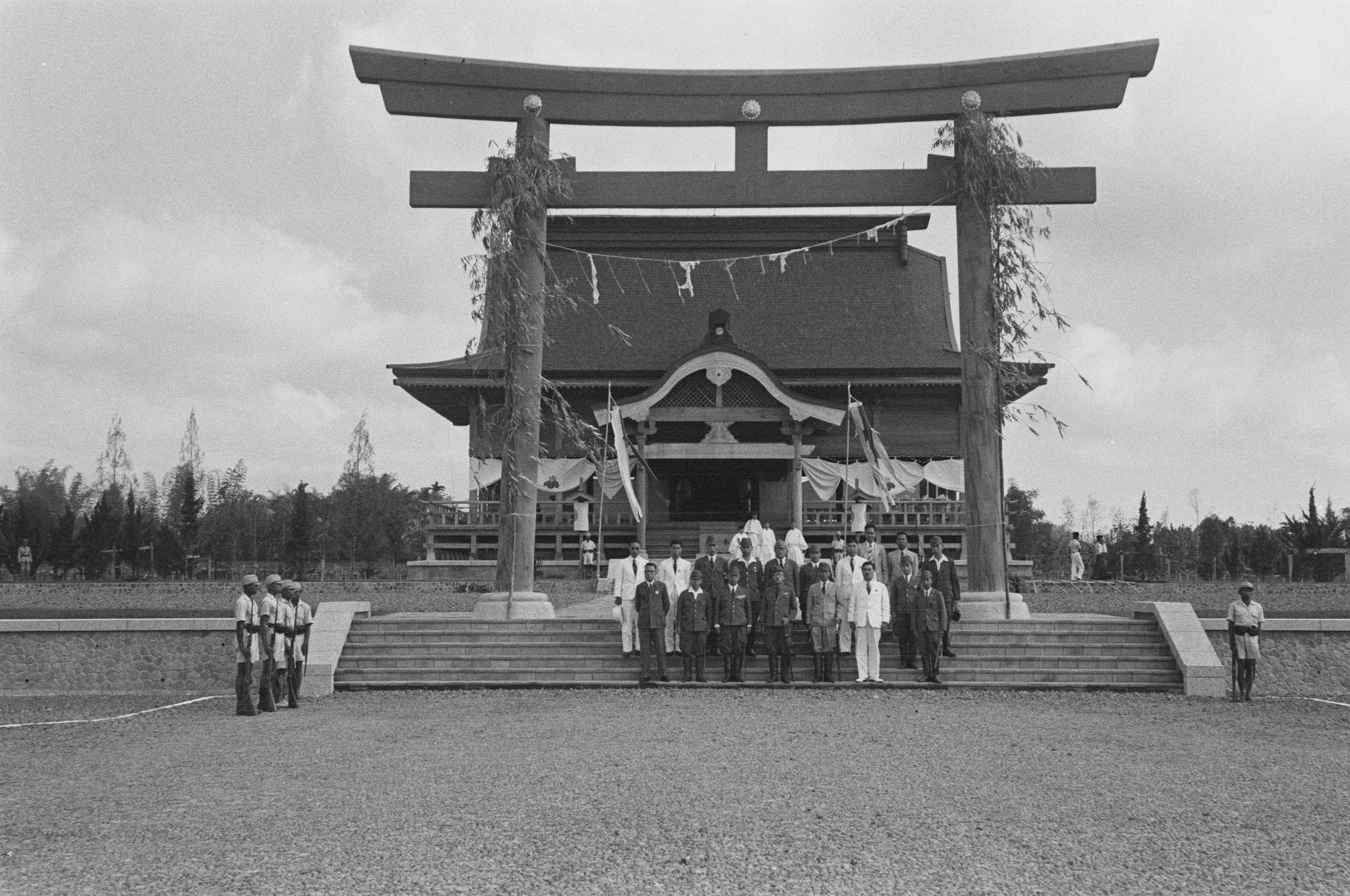
Ching Nan Jinja, a Japanese Shinto shrine located in Malang, is one of the 11 Shinto shrines built in Indonesia during the Japanese occupation.

After the end of the 1942‒1945 Japanese occupation of the Dutch East Indies, roughly 3,000 Imperial Japanese Army soldiers chose to remain in Indonesia and fight alongside local people against the Dutch colonists in the Indonesian National Revolution; roughly one-third were killed (among whom many are buried in the Kalibata Heroes' Cemetery), while another one-third chose to remain in Indonesia after the fighting ended. In the 1960s, Sukarno asked the Japanese government to provide scholarships to Indonesian students to study in Japan as part of the technology transfer effort as well as part of the war spoils. Some of these Indonesian students married Japanese and produced Indonesian Nikkei descendants. The Indonesian students who graduated from Japan are now members of Persada, the Association of Alumni from Japan, which was founded in 1963.

However, not all of these soldiers were Japanese, several famous soldiers who remained like Li Baiqing 李柏青 and Chen Chih-hsiung were ethnic Han Chinese from Taiwan.

In the 1970s, Japanese manufacturers, especially in the electronics sector, began to set up factories in Indonesia; this sparked the migration of a new wave of Japanese expatriates, mainly managers and technical staff connected to large Japanese corporations. In the late 1990s, there was also migration in the opposite direction; many of the Nikkei Indonesians from Sulawesi began migrating to Japan to work in the seafood processing industry. As of 2004, there were estimated to be about 1,200 of them living in the town of Ōarai, Ibaraki. Furthermore, there was a large outflow of Japanese expatriates in 1998, due to the May riots and the associated political chaos. However, a decade later, the Japanese still made up Jakarta's second-largest expatriate community, after the Koreans.

== Business and employment ==
The Japanese communities in the Dutch East Indies, like those in the rest of colonial Southeast Asia, remained prostitution-based as late as World War I. The remnant of this prostitution business can be trace in Surabaya's Jalan Kembang Jepun, "the Street of the Japanese Flowers", located in the city's old Chinatown. Prostitution was outlawed in the Dutch East Indies in 1912, but many Japanese women appear to have continued working in the trade clandestinely. However, by the 1930s, the economic focus of the Japanese community had shifted largely towards agriculture, marine industries, and retailing of imported Japanese products. More recent Japanese expatriates are typically investors connected with electronics manufacturing.

== Social integration ==
Early Japanese migrants to the Dutch East Indies were classified as "foreign orientals" by the Dutch government. This status meant they were subject to restrictions on their freedom of movement, place of residence, and employment. However, in 1898, they were reclassified as "honorary Europeans", giving them formal legal equality with the colonisers and removing those restrictions. Yet despite this formal equality, local peoples' image of the Japanese people in their midst was still not very positive. During the World War II occupation of Indonesia, many Japanese officers took local women as concubines. Children born from such relationships, growing up in the post-war period often found themselves the target bullying due to their ancestry, as well as suffering official discrimination under government policies which gave preference to pribumi in the hiring of civil servants.

In Jakarta, Grand Wijaya Center and Blok M have clusters of businesses catering to Japanese expatriates, including restaurants, supermarkets selling imported food products, and the like; Blok M in particular is noted for its concentration of izakaya.

== Marriage ==
759 Japanese living in Indonesia have the right of permanent residency; these consist primarily of Japanese women married to Indonesian men. In Bali the number of Japanese residents registered with the Japanese Consulate in Denpasar has increased from 43 in 1987, to 595 in 1995, and further to 1,755 in 2006 and 2,225 in 2010. The consulate receives an annual average of about 100 cases of marriage registration, with over 90 percent of them involving Japanese women who marry local men. It processes between 10 and 12 applications for divorce per year. Some met their husbands in the context of study abroad, either when the husband-to-be was studying in Japan, or when both were studying in an Anglophone country such as the United States or Australia. Others came to Indonesia, especially Bali, as tourists, and met their husbands there. Japan is one of the largest sources of tourists in Bali, and many Japanese women married to Indonesian men are settled there; one scholar who studied the phenomenon in 1994 estimated four hundred resided there at the time.

A large number of the tourists consist of young urban women; they see Bali not as an exotic destination, but rather a nostalgic one, evoking the past landscape of Japan and a return to their "real selves" which they feel are being stifled by life in Japanese cities. Among these, a few come first as tourists, especially to Kuta and Ubud, and then after repeat visits, marry a local man. In some cases, these visits take the form of "romance tourism" or "female sex tourism", with women entering into relationships with male sex workers, known colloquially as "Kuta Cowboys". They use Indonesian and Japanese, or less commonly English when communicating with their husbands, children, and grandchildren, but Indonesian far more commonly than other languages when communicating with other relatives.

== Media ==
The Daily Jakarta Shimbun is Indonesia's only Japanese language newspaper. It was founded in 1998 by Yasuo Kusano, who was formerly the Mainichi Shimbun bureau chief in Jakarta from 1981 to 1986; he returned to Indonesia after the fall of Suharto, and, finding that many publications banned during the Suharto era were being revived, decided to found a newspaper to provide accurate, in-depth information about Indonesia's new democratisation to Japanese readers. Since then, its circulation has grown from 50 copies to more than 4,000.

Portrayals in Indonesian popular culture centred on Japanese characters include Remy Sylado's 1990s novel Kembang Jepun. Set during World War II, it tells a story of a geisha and her Indonesian husband who participates in Supriyadi's anti-Japanese uprising. It was reprinted as a full-length book by Gramedia Pustaka Utama in 2003. Another work with a similar theme is Lang Fang's 2007 novel Perempuan Kembang Jepun, from the same publisher, about a 1940s geisha who becomes the second wife of a Surabaya businessman. The Indonesian martial arts film The Raid 2 depicts a Japanese crime syndicate in Jakarta.

== Education ==
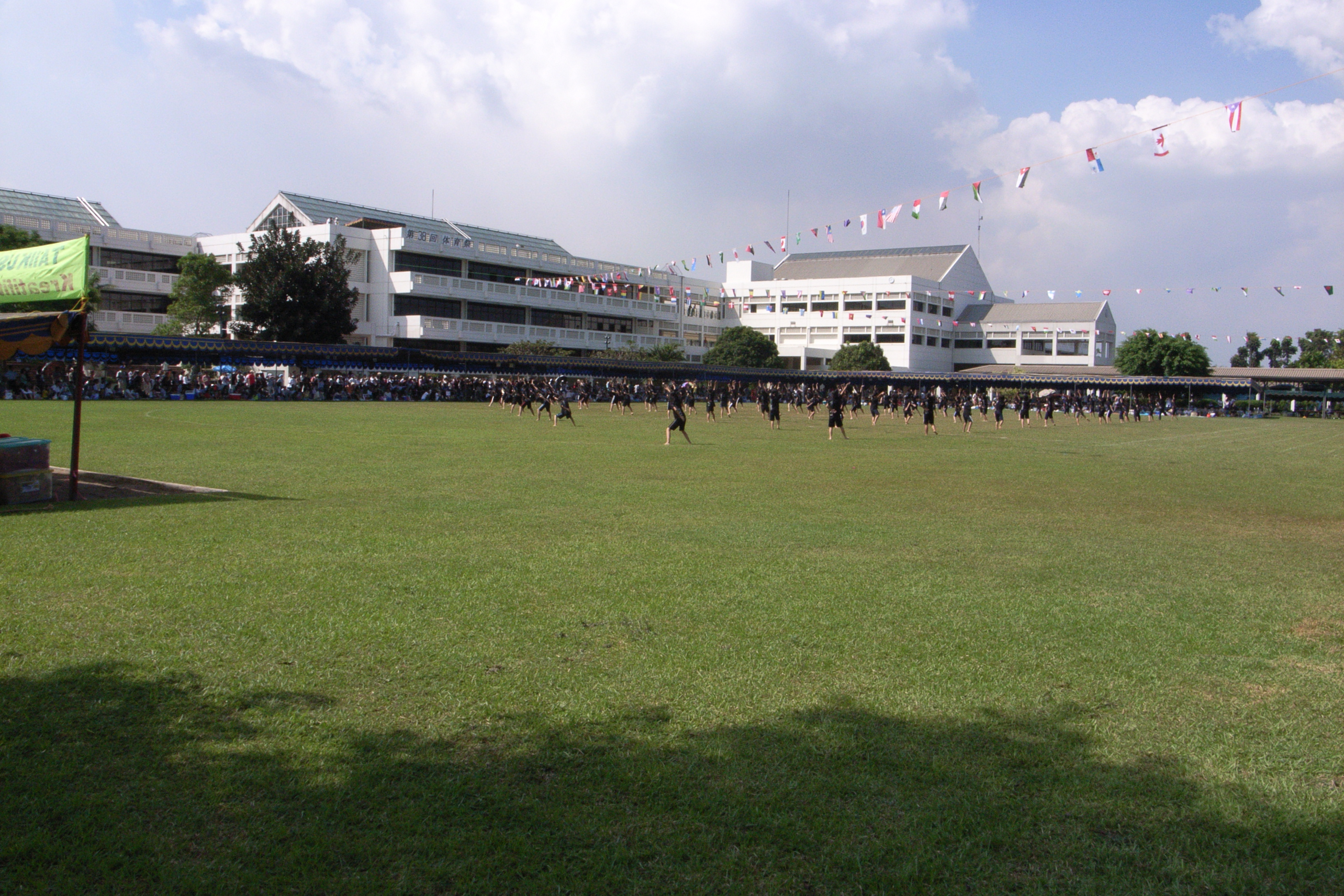
Jakarta Japanese School

Locations of Japanese international schools, day and supplementary, in Indonesia recognized by MEXT (gray dots represent closed schools)

Several Japanese international schools are in Indonesia. The Jakarta Japanese School is located in South Tangerang, Banten in Greater Jakarta. In 2018 Cikarang Japanese School (CJS, チカラン日本人学校) opened its doors in Deltamas, Cikarang.

The Bandung Japanese School (Indonesian: Sekolah Jepang Bandung; バンドン日本人学校) is in Bandung. The Sekolah Jepang Surabaya (スラバヤ日本人学校) is located in Surabaya.

The Japanese School of Bali is a supplementary school (hoshu jugyo ko or hoshuko) in Denpasar, Bali. The Makassar Japanese Language Class is a supplementary programme in Makassar, Sulawesi.

The Medan Japanese School (メダン日本人学校), a day school, previously existed. A hoshuko in Semarang also closed.

== Notable people ==
- Ayana Shahab, former member of JKT48 (her mother is Japanese while her father is Indonesian mixed Arab).
- Aiko Harumi, former member of JKT48.
- Aelke Mariska, actress.
- Aiko Saruwosuri Isura (also known as Chef Aiko), TV presenter and chef.
- Alwi Assegaf, actor (mixed Arab descent).
- Batara Eto, Indonesian-born Japanese entrepreneur, co-founder of Mixi.
- Dewi Sukarno, Eight wife of Sukarno, the first president of Indonesia.
- Dian Nitami, actress (her maternal grandfather is a Japanese, placing her in sansei generation).
- Dominique Diyose, actress and model.
- Erika Ebisawa, former member of JKT48.
- Fuyu Iwasaki, Indonesian badminton player of mixed Japanese descent.
- Haruka Nakagawa, former member of AKB48 and JKT48.
- Hiroaki Katō, TV presenter and actor.
- Hiromitsu Harada, a famed Japanese chef who frequently appeared in television, introducing Japanese culinary in comical style.
- Ichiki Tatsuo, Journalist who defected to Indonesia during the Indonesian national revolution.
- Kento Toyoda, footballer.
- Keiko Warman, actor.
- Mondo Gascaro, musician, singer and songwriter.
- Seiya Da Costa Lay, professional footballer.
- Staffan Horito, professional footballer.
- Machiko Kusnaeni, former managing director of RRI.
- Noboru Otobe, Japanese soldier who stayed in Indonesia to support the independence movement.
- Nobuyuki Suzuki, actor and film producer
- Rahmat Shigeru Ono, Japanese defector to Indonesia, Mayor in the Indonesian Army.
- Reino Barack, businessman and socialite.
- Rene Nozawa, former member of JKT48.
- Rina Chikano, member of JKT48 and former member of AKB48.
- Rio Waida, surfing athlete.
- Rosano Barack, businessman and one of the founders of Global Mediacom.
- Ryuji Utomo, footballer who currently plays as a defender for Liga 1 club Persija Jakarta and the Indonesia national football team.
- Sakiko Kanase, Model and Hostess, Sixth wife of Sukarno.
- Saartje Specx, Daughter of Jacques Specx.
- Tiara Andini, actress and singer
- Tomegoro Yoshizumi, spy and journalist who defected to Indonesia during the Indonesian national revolution.
- Umaru Takaeda, songwriter and musician.
- Yuka Tamada, musician and actress.
- Yukino Amira, actress.
- Yuki Kato, actress (her father is a Japanese).

== Gallery ==
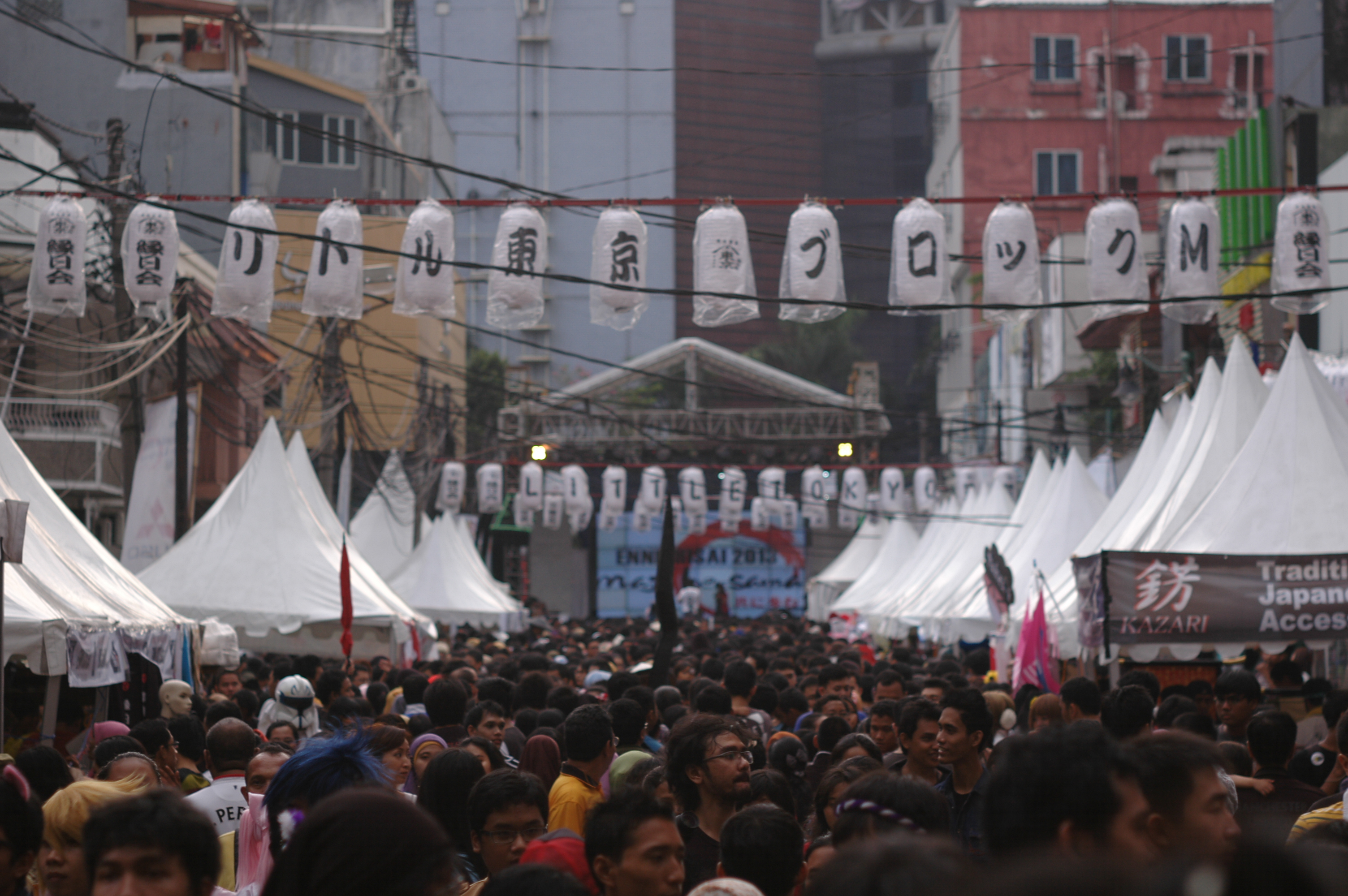
Ennichisai, a Japanese cultural festival organised by the Japanese community in Jakarta.

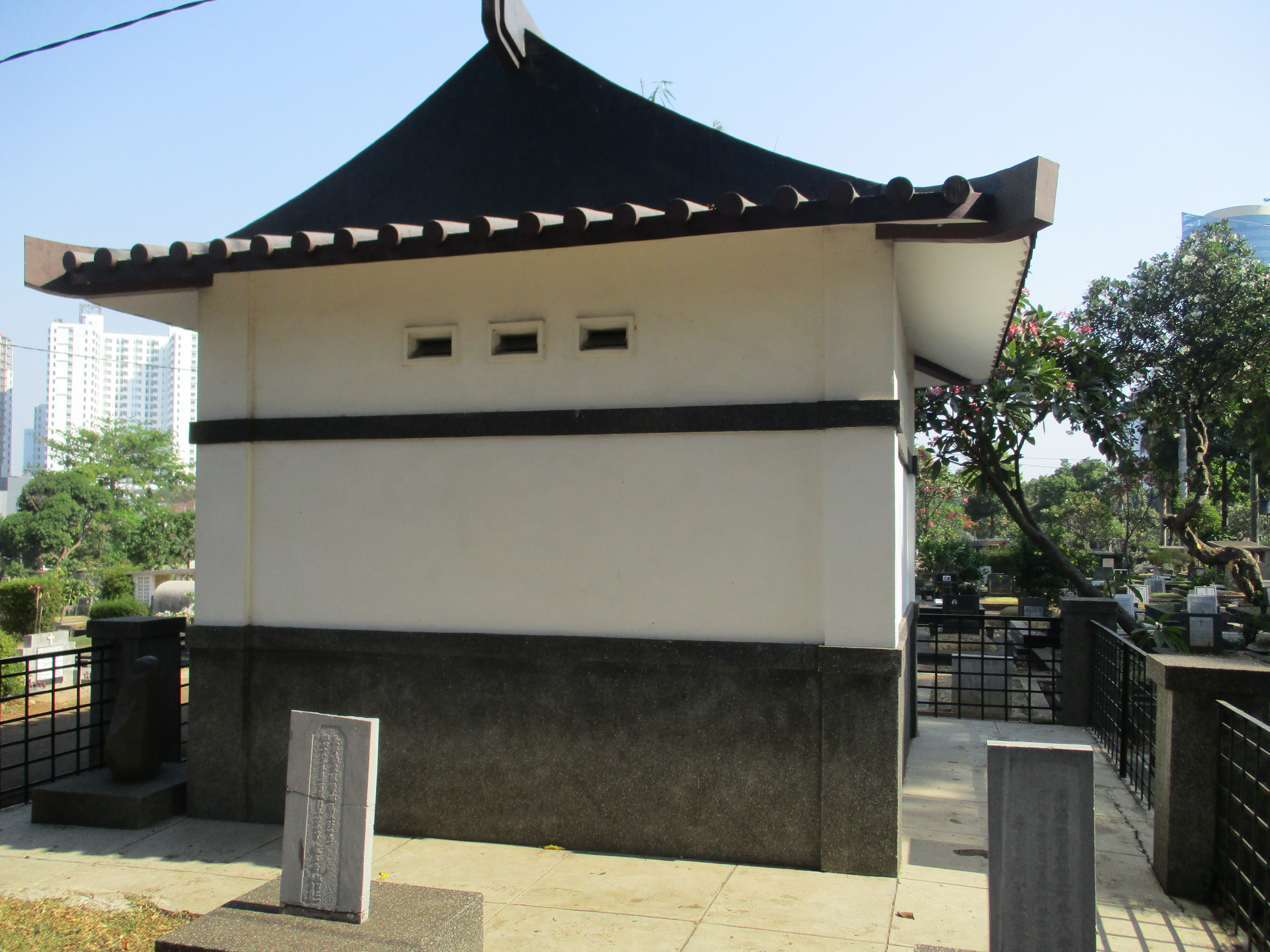
Japanese ashes house in Jakarta (TPU Petamburan)

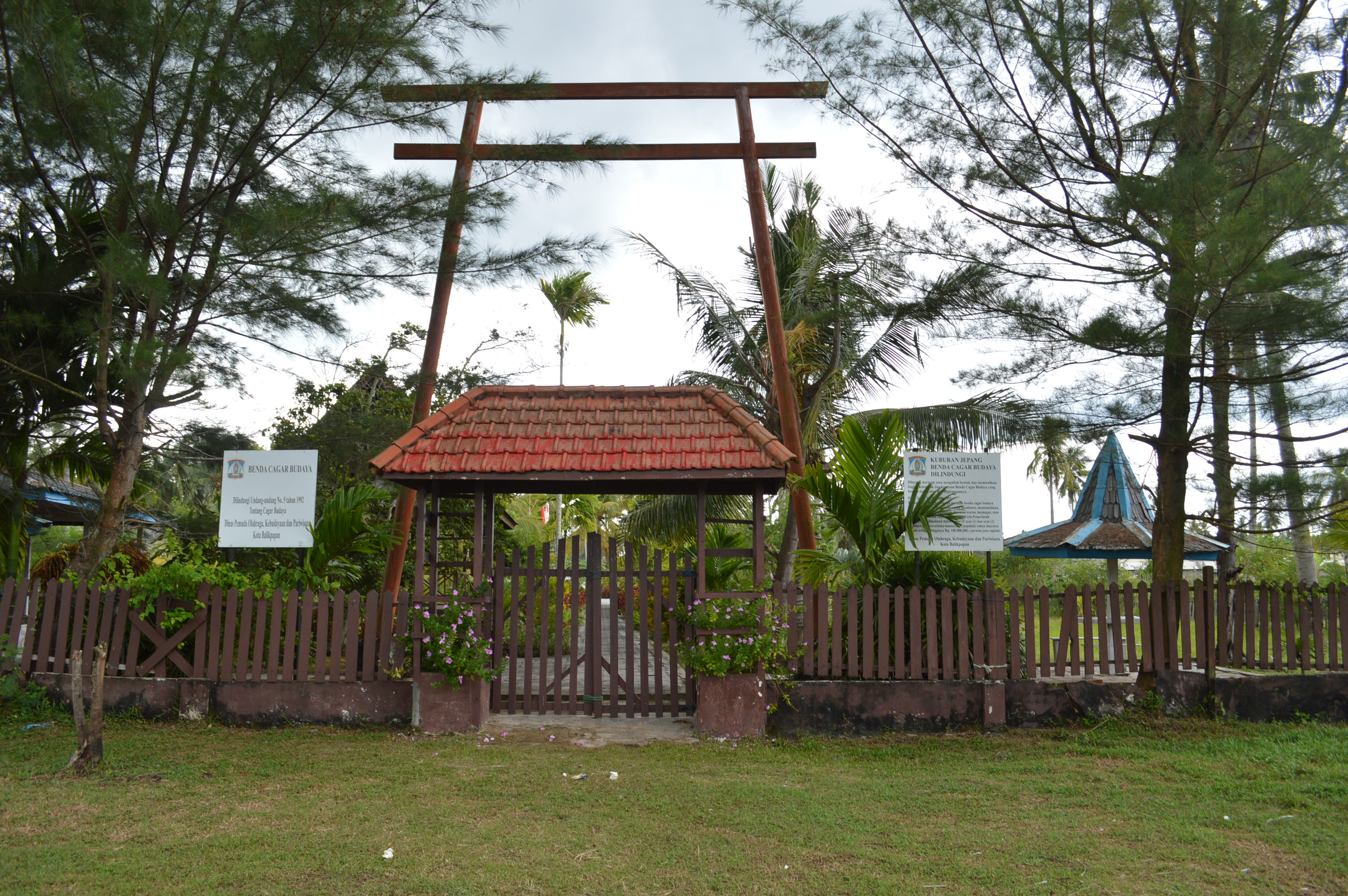
Japanese cemetery with a Torii in Balikpapan.

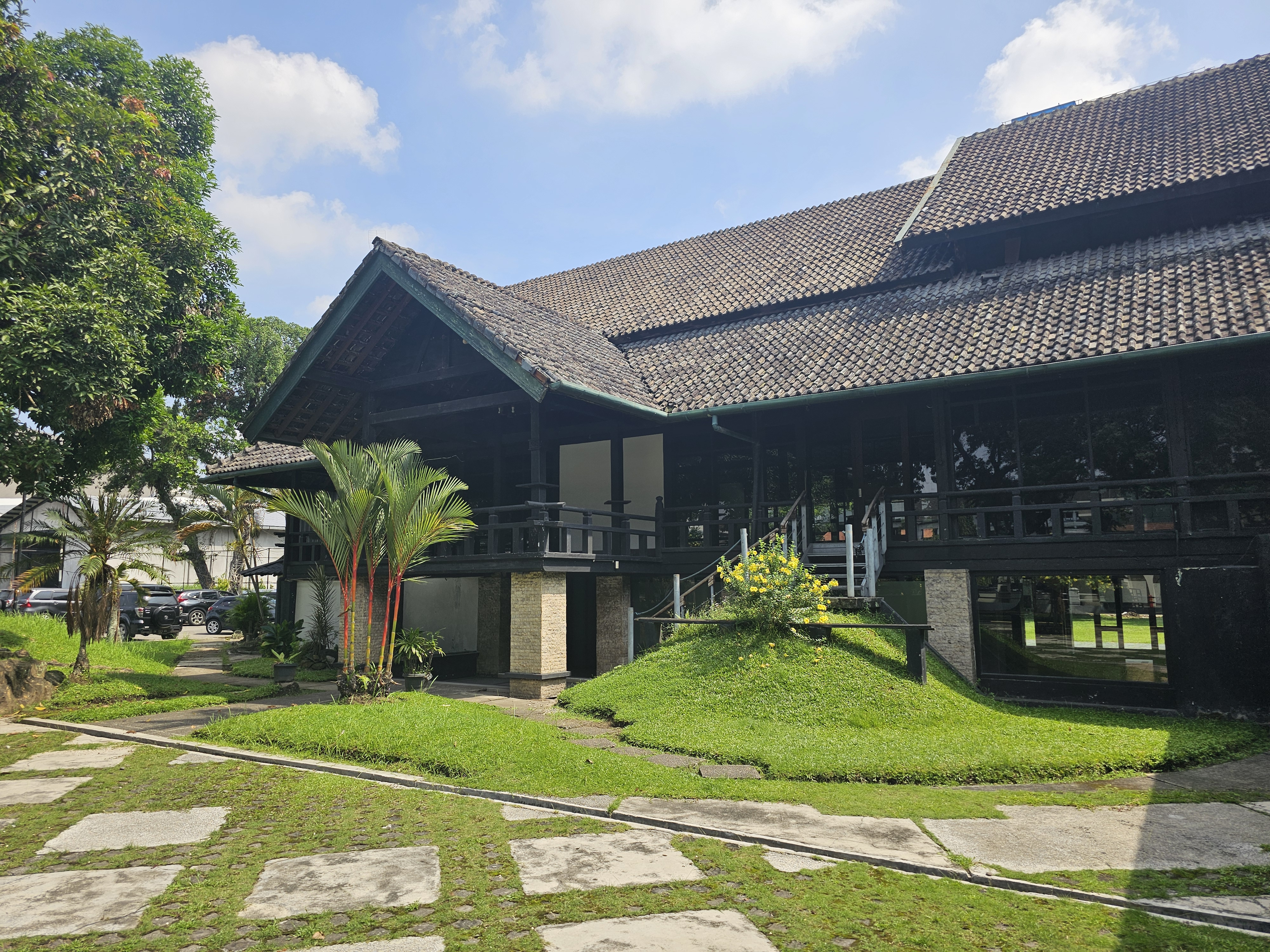
Shamusho of Hirohara Shrine in Medan.

== See also ==
- Jagatara-bumi
- Indonesia–Japan relations
- Chinese Indonesians
- Indonesians in Japan
- Koreans in Indonesia
- Filipinos in Indonesia
