= Hawaii Ishizuchi Jinja =

Former Shinto shrine in Honolulu, Hawaii

- ハワイ石鎚神社
- The shrine in 2010

Religion
- Affiliation: Shinto
- Deity: Ishizuchi-Hiko-no-Mikoto; Iwatsuchihiko-no-mikoto
- Status: Closed

Location
- Location: 2020 South King Street, Honolulu, Hawaii
- Country: United States
- Interactive map of Hawaii Ishizuchi Jinja
- Coordinates: 21.2950°N 157.8294°W

Architecture
- Architect: Yoshitaka Hayashi
- Creator: Minematsu Hayashi and his sons Yoshitaka and Masaharu
- Established: 1913
- Completed: 1963

Hawaii Ishizuchi Jinja (ハワイ石鎚神社) was a Shinto shrine in Honolulu, Hawaii, United States. It was established on February 17, 1913, by Shina Miyake (三宅志奈), and became a branch of Ishizuchi Jinja in Ehime Prefecture, Japan. Following the closure of its organization in November 2023, its kami were transferred to Izumo Taisha Hawaii.

The shrine's observances included hatsumōde, the customary first shrine visit of the New Year. Its centennial celebration in 2013 brought together priests and members of the parent shrine in Japan for a religious ceremony, followed by dinner and entertainment.

== History ==
=== Foundation and early organization ===
The shrine originated in the religious activities of Shina Miyake (三宅志奈), an immigrant from Hiroshima Prefecture who had grown up in a household affiliated with Jōdo-shū Buddhism. According to a later account of the shrine's foundation, on February 17, 1913, she reported possession by a deity she called Takayama no Takagami. An immigrant from Saijō identified this deity with the god of Mount Ishizuchi, and Miyake adopted that identification. She subsequently traveled to Japan for religious training and returned with a divided spirit of the deity from Ishizuchi Jinja. Early devotees sought healing through her mediumship.

Worship initially took place at an altar in Miyake's home. A temporary shrine was established on Alapai Street. The congregation received recognition as a nonprofit religious organization from the territorial government on October 22, 1917. According to contemporary newspaper accounts like the Honolulu Star-Bulletin published in 1962, the South King Street property was acquired in 1918, and a shrine was built there that year.

Miyake returned to Japan on June 13, 1927. Tomiji Kimura, who had trained at Ishizuchi Jinja and Taga Shrine in Matsuyama, succeeded her as the second chief priest. Under Kimura, purification rites and festivals became the principal activities, replacing the earlier emphasis on Miyake's mediumship. During his tenure, the shrine joined the Honolulu Shinto Federation.

=== Wartime disruption and postwar recovery ===
Following the attack on Pearl Harbor, Kimura was arrested by the Federal Bureau of Investigation in December 1941 and held at Sand Island. In February 1942, he was transferred to the continental United States, where he was incarcerated at several camps, including Fort Missoula and the Santa Fe camp. He returned to Hawaii in November 1945 aboard the Yarmouth.

The shrine had been taken over by government authorities, and Kimura was unable to resume public religious activities after his return. On June 1, 1949, the Office of Alien Property issued Vesting Order 13323 under the Trading with the Enemy Act, vesting the shrine's real estate, ornaments, equipment and furnishings in the United States Attorney General.

On February 5, 1954, the Pacific Citizen reported that the Office of Alien Property had approved the return of the property, subject to a final audit. It noted that Kimura had been occupying the premises but could not conduct services while the property remained vested.

Public activities resumed with hatsumōde in 1955.

By February 1962, construction had begun on a building designed to accommodate a preschool on the first floor and the shrine on the second level. The previous shrine, built on the property in 1918, was demolished in 1962 to make way for the new development. The new sanctuary was completed in 1963 to commemorate the shrine's fiftieth anniversary.

=== Later development and relations with other shrines ===
In 1965, the kami of Hawaii Kato Jinja were enshrined at Ishizuchi Jinja. Kato Jinja, established in 1911, had been affiliated with Katō Shrine in Kumamoto Prefecture and venerated Katō Kiyomasa.

After Kimura's death, Shigeo Fujino became Ishizuchi's third chief priest. Fujino also served Hawaii Kotohira Jinsha – Hawaii Dazaifu Tenmangu, and the two congregations agreed to cooperate as sister shrines under his leadership. Fujino died in 1988. Naoya Shimura became chief priest in 1999.

The relationship with the parent shrine in Japan continued through visits by priests and members. At the 2013 centennial, Shimura was joined by Chief Priest Okimi Sogame, two other priests and members of Ishizuchi Jinja Honkyo.

=== Closure and transfer of the kami ===
The organization closed in November 2023, its 110th anniversary year. Izumo Taisha's subsequent account attributed the decision to the shrine's gradual decline and the effects of the COVID-19 pandemic. On November 19, 2023, the kami of both Ishizuchi Jinja and Kato Jinja were transferred to Izumo Taisha Hawaii. Members of both congregations attended the re-enshrinement ceremony conducted by Izumo's priests. The sacred body was placed in the right-side altar of the Izumo shrine. It has since been listed for sale at 4.5 million dollars.

== Architecture ==
Minematsu Hayashi (left), Yoshitaka Hayashi (center) and Masaharu Hayashi (right) working on a carving for the shrine in 1962.

The sanctuary completed in 1963 was built in the nagare-zukuri style, with a kokera-buki wooden-shingle roof. It was constructed by Minematsu Hayashi and his sons Yoshitaka and Masaharu, shrine builders from Saka-machi, Aki District, Hiroshima Prefecture, who arrived in Hawaii in August 1962. Yoshitaka was identified as the group's architect, while Masaharu was a woodcarver who had completed a thirteen-year apprenticeship in Japan. Members of the congregation paid the builders' salaries, transportation, housing and food expenses.

A newspaper report published during construction described the sanctuary as measuring 40 by 15 feet (12.2 by 4.6 m) and being made entirely of Douglas fir. Its components were precut for assembly above the preschool, and the wood was intended to remain unpainted. The carved pieces were to be joined with bolts, wooden pegs and concealed nails.

The sanctuary occupied the upper level of the building, reached by an exterior stairway; a hall occupied the lower level. A white torii marked the entrance to the grounds.

A 2024 property brochure recorded a total building area of 5,102 square feet (474 m^{2}) and a land area of 13,062 square feet (1,213 m^{2}).

== Kami and worship ==
A bilingual explanatory sign at the shrine identified its deity as Iwatsuchihiko-no-mikoto, also known as Ishizuchi-Ōkami, and described him as a child of Izanagi and Izanami. It explained that the deity was represented by three images, symbolizing the next three divine virtues:

Image	Virtue	Blessings described on the sign
Ball bearing (nigi-mitama)	"Benevolence"	Household security; protects convalescence of illness
Mirror (kushi-mitama)	"Wisdom"	Protects prosperity of agriculture, industry, commerce and fishery; and scholastic achievement
Sword (ara-mitama)	"Courage"	Encourages courage and perseverance, abolishes evil, and protects against crisis

The sign also described a ceremony in which a sacred image was placed against the worshipper's body to receive the deity's virtues. The doctrine of the Ishizuchi belief, or "Faith of the Movement Veneration of Ancestral Spirits", included:

Doctrine	Virtue	Blessings described on the sign
Shubatsu	"Cleansing"	Cleanse mind and body through ablution, first step in purification
Shugyou	"Training"	Discard malice intentions and experience feelings of selflessness
Chinkon	"Repose of souls"	By being touched by the spirit of God, the spirit will become calm by becoming one with God

== Festivities ==
According to the sign at the shrine, it had the following festivities:

Annual Hawaii Ishizuchi Shrine Shinto Rituals

- New Year's Day Festival
- First Shinto Assembly
- Last Day of Winter & Star Festival
- Anniversary of Ishizuchi-Ookami's arrival to Hawaii
- Spring Festival
- Purification Ritual
- Summer Festival
- Purification & Final Night Ritual
- Monthly Ritual

== See also ==
- Shinto
- Shinto shrine
- List of Shinto shrines
- Overseas Shinto
- List of Shinto shrines in the United States
- Hawaii Kotohira Jinsha – Hawaii Dazaifu Tenmangu
- Izumo Taishakyo Mission of Hawaii
