= San Pedro Daijingū =

Shinto shrine in California, US

- サンピドロ大神宮
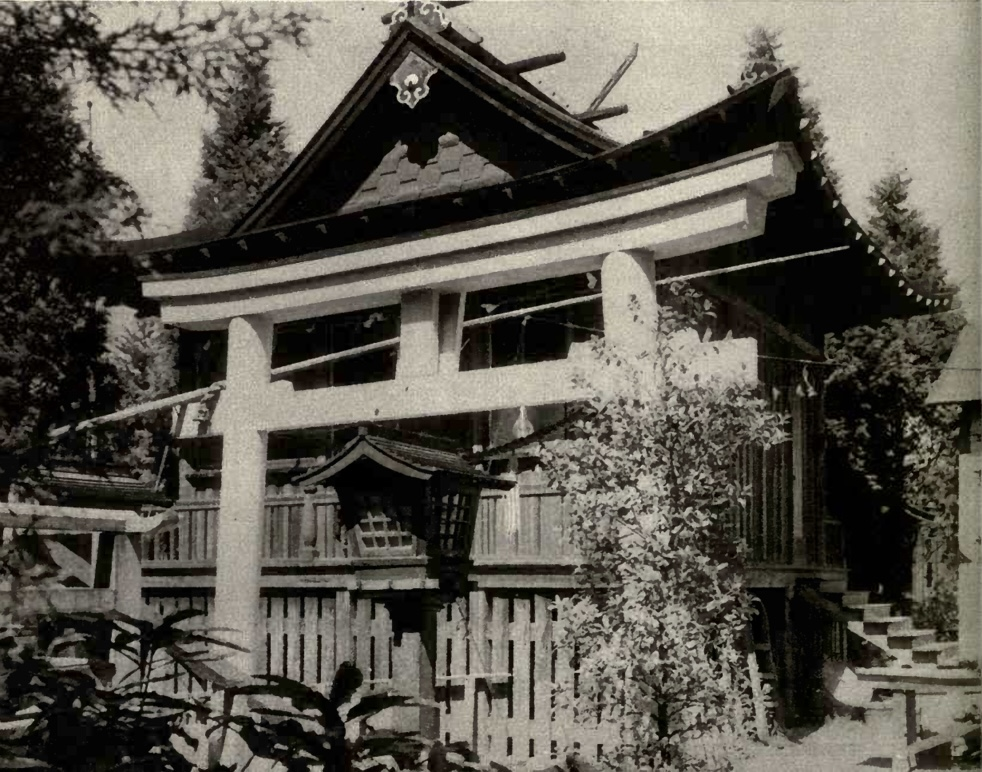
- The shrine in a photograph published in 1941

Religion
- Affiliation: Shinto
- Type: Shinto Shrine

Location
- Location: 226 Terminal Way, Terminal Island, Los Angeles
- State: California
- Country: United States
- Approximate former site at 226 Terminal Way
- Coordinates: 33.740°N 118.269°W(approximate)

San Pedro Daijingū (サンピドロ大神宮) was a Shinto shrine serving the Japanese American fishing community on Terminal Island in Los Angeles, California. Its Japanese name appears in the 1937 community history San Pidoro Dōhō Hattenroku.

== History ==
Shinkichi Miyoshi proposed establishing the shrine in 1930. The lease permit to establish the shrine, then called the North American Shinto Temple, East San Pedro Branch, at 226 Terminal Way, was submitted to the Harbor Commission and accepted in March 1931. A celebration followed, and then in September, Miyoshi went to Daijin-Gu shrine in Honolulu, Hawaii, for religious study. After two months, Miyoshi came back to Terminal Island a Shinto priest. On December 6, 1931, a public ceremony was held to mark the building of the shrine's foundation. In summer of 1933, with the name change to San Pedro Daijin-Gu, the shrine was formally registered as a nonprofit organization in California.

Shinkichi Miyoshi preparing to leave the shrine, with portraits of Abraham Lincoln and George Washington in the background; photograph published February 28, 1942.

The shrine displayed portraits of George Washington and Abraham Lincoln. In a 1935 report by The Straits Times, portraits of both presidents had been enshrined and their birthdays designated as days of worship. Both portraits were still present during preparations for the forced evacuation of Terminal Island in February 1942, appearing behind Miyoshi in a photograph published in the Daily News on February 28.

Following the forced removal of Terminal Island's Japanese American residents in 1942, the United States Navy demolished the shrine along with most of the settlement's buildings.

== Architecture ==
The shrine consisted of a small, single-room building in Japanese architectural design. A torii and two fox statues marked the entrance to the property.

== Legacy ==
The Terminal Island Japanese Memorial, dedicated in 2002, includes a torii recalling the community's former Shinto shrine, alongside bronze statues of two fishermen.

== Gallery ==
Exterior view of the temple

Alternate angle

A woman and her son walk past the Shinto Shrine in the Japanese community on Terminal Island.

== See also ==
- List of Shinto shrines in the United States
- Overseas Shinto
- Internment of Japanese Americans
- Daijingu Temple of Hawaii
