= The Daily Jakarta Shimbun =

Japanese-language newspaper in Indonesia

- Type: Daily newspaper
- Publisher: PT. Bina Komunika Asiatama
- Founded: 28 July 1998
- Language: Japanese
- City: Jakarta
- Country: Indonesia
- Website: jakartashimbun.com

The Daily Jakarta Shimbun (じゃかるた新聞, Jakaruta Shinbun; Indonesian: Harian Jakarta Shimbun) is a Japanese-language newspaper in Indonesia.The Daily Jakarta Shimbun was first published on November 16, 1998. The company publishing the paper, PT. Bina Komunika Asiatama, has its headquarters in Jakarta. Circulation in 2009 was about 4,000.

== History ==
The company was established on 28 July 1998 by 6 founders namely Mr. Fredi Chandra, Mr. Adam Nugroho, Mr. Jusuf Karadibrata, Mr. Drs. Soekrisno and Dr. Ryuji Nakamura led by General Wiyogo Atmodarminto. The 6 members directly negotiated to the Ministry of Information, the regulatory authority for media licensing at the time, and obtained a license to publish on 6 November 1998.

The company invited Mr. Yasuo Kusano, a Japanese journalist, as editor-in-chief of the newspaper. Kusano was formerly the Mainichi Shimbun bureau chief in Jakarta from 1981 to 1986. After the fall of Suharto, he found that many publications banned during the Suharto era were being revived, decided to join this newspaper to provide accurate, in-depth information about Indonesia's new democratization to Japanese readers. Its circulation was 200 in the beginning.

The Daily Jakarta Shimbun is the sister publication of The Daily Manila Shimbun which was launched in 1992 by Hirochika Noguchi.

== Contents ==
Each issue has eight pages except on Fridays; on those days there is also an additional lifestyle supplement. Therefore, Friday issues have a total of 12 pages. Since January 2020, it has been structured with eight pages.

== Distribution ==
The newspaper company distributes copies to Garuda Indonesia for the airline to provide to Japanese customers. It also distributes copies to language centers and universities for students of the Japanese language.

== See also ==
- Japanese migration to Indonesia
- Jakarta Japanese School
