= Manila Shimbun =

Japanese language newspaper in the Philippines

日刊まにら新聞 The Daily Manila Shimbun
- The front page of the Manila Shimbun on March 27, 2013
- Type: Daily newspaper
- Format: Broadsheet
- Founder: Hirochika Noguchi
- Editor-in-chief: Eiichiro Ishiyama
- Founded: May 3, 1992
- Ceased publication: December 31, 2021 (print edition)
- Relaunched: October 1, 2022 (print edition)
- Language: Japanese (primary); English (secondary)
- Headquarters: Makati, Metro Manila, Philippines
- Circulation: 4,500 (2020)
- Website: manila-shimbun.com

The Manila Shimbun (まにら新聞), officially called The Daily Manila Shimbun (日刊まにら新聞, Nikkan Manira Shinbun), is a daily newspaper in the Philippines written in the Japanese language. It is Southeast Asia's first modern-day daily Japanese-language newspaper. It began publishing under its current name in January 1996, and later launched a sister publication in Indonesia, The Daily Jakarta Shimbun, in November 1998.

Published as a broadsheet, the newspaper is written primarily in Japanese but also has a section in English, run by both Japanese and Filipino staff members.

== History ==
Established on May 3, 1992 as the Kyodo News Daily,

In 2014, the newspaper signed a memorandum of agreement with the Tourism Promotions Board, an attached agency of the Department of Tourism, to promote Japanese tourism in the Philippines through media placements both in the Manila Shimbun and its sister magazines.

The newspaper ended its print edition in December 2021 due to the COVID-19 pandemic in the Philippines, leaving the online edition as its sole format, although the print edition resumed production on October 1, 2022. Production was halted again in November 2023, and then resumed on September 1, 2024.

On June 16, 2026, the newspaper reportedly suspended operations.

== Corporate Social Responsibility ==
The newspaper also has a history of community outreach, particularly to non-Japanese-speaking Filipinos, through the Daily Manila Shimbun Culture Center. It began organizing an annual cooking festival in 1998, as well as a Filipino-language essay writing contest in 2002.

== Awards ==
It has won several awards from the Association of Nikkei and Japanese Abroad, including two grand prizes in 2004 and 2007, while a journalist for the newspaper, Takehide Mizutani, won the Takeshi Kaikō Prize in 2011 for his book The Men Who Abandoned Japan (日本を捨てた男たち), inspired by the homeless Japanese he met in the Philippines as a journalist.

== Name ==
The Manila Shimbun also refers to an unrelated World War II-era newspaper published by the Manila Shimbunsha (マニラ新聞社), a corporation that held a monopoly on all wartime print information dissemination for propaganda purposes, including control over pre-war outlets that were allowed to remain open.
