= List of Shinto shrines =

For lists of Shinto shrines, see:

- List of Shinto shrines in Japan
  - List of Shinto shrines in Kyoto
- List of Shinto shrines outside Japan
  - List of Shinto shrines in Taiwan
  - List of Shinto shrines in the United States

== See also ==
- List of Jingū
- List of Tōshō-gū
- Overseas Shinto
