= Wakamiya Inari Shrine =

- U.S. National Register of Historic Places
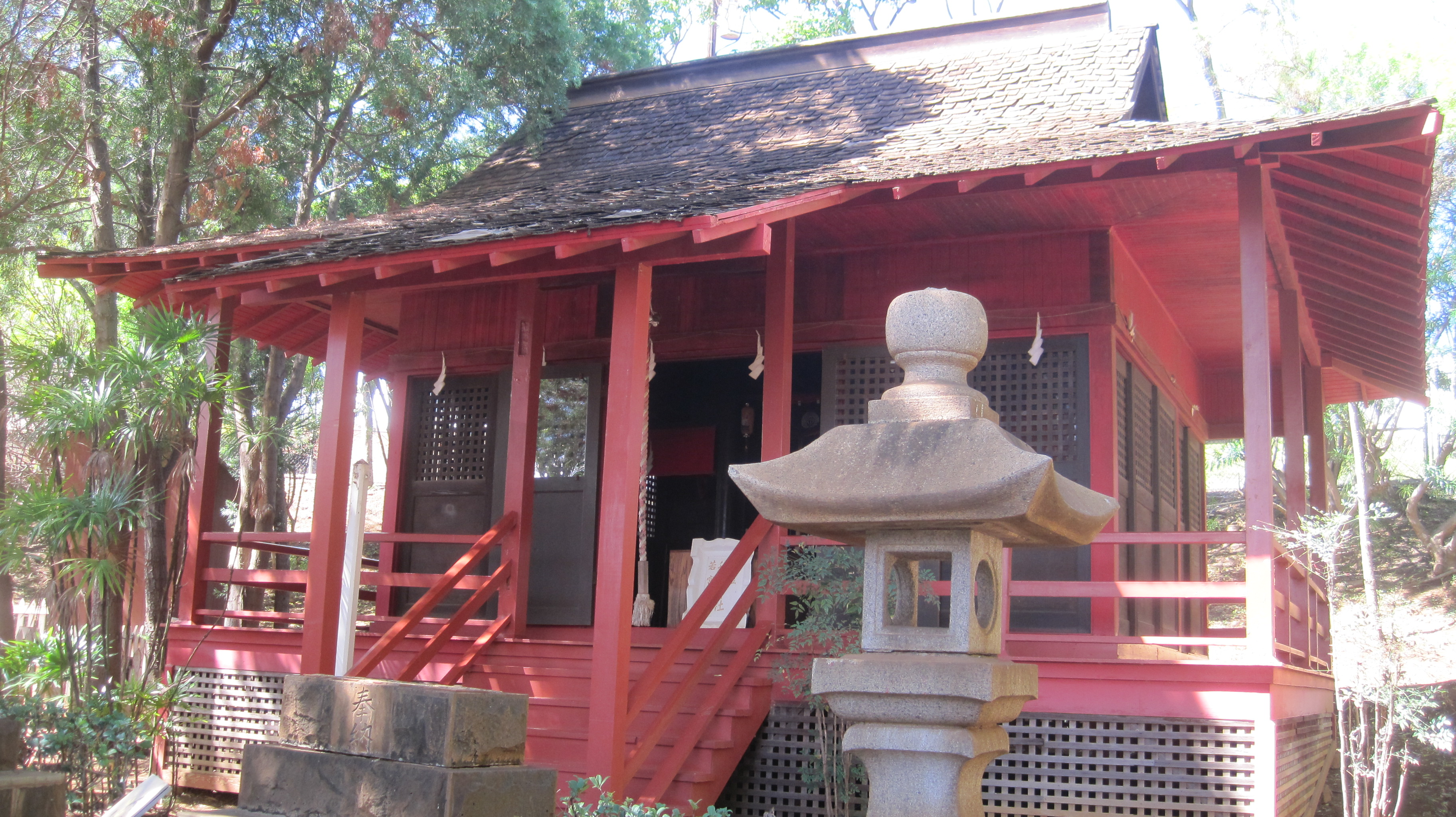
- Main building

- Location within Hawaii
- Nearest city: Waipahu, Hawaii
- Coordinates: 21°23′9.6″N 158°0′41.4″W
- Area: 1/4 acre
- Built: 1914, 1918
- Architect: Haschun
- Architectural style: Japanese
- NRHP reference No.: 80001285
- Added to NRHP: 8 January 1980

Wakamiya Inari Shrine at Waipahu Cultural Garden in Waipahu, Hawaiʻi, is the last surviving example of Inari Shrine architecture on Oʻahu. Unlike most Shinto shrines, which are unpainted, those dedicated to the fox deity Inari, the god of the harvest, are painted bright red. This shrine thus represents not just the religious heritage of Japanese immigrants to Hawaiʻi, but also their principal early roles as agricultural laborers on sugarcane and pineapple plantations. It was added to the National Register of Historic Places on 8 January 1980.

The simple wood frame building measures 19 by 26 feet, with wooden steps leading up to a raised floor with a balustraded verandah that wraps around the sanctuary. Long eaves of the irimoya (hip-and-gable) roof extend over both the front steps and the verandah. The sanctuary is enclosed by sliding doors with latticework tops and contains an inner altar behind a bell rope and a box for offerings. The building has been carefully restored but still lacks the chigi (forked finials) above the ornamental ridgepole.

The shrine was founded by Reverend Yoshio Akizaki, a Shinto priest who had studied in Tokyo in 1912. Originally built in 1914 in Honolulu's industrial area of Kakaʻako by a Japanese architect known only as Haschun, it was relocated in 1918 to 2132 South King Street in Moʻiliʻili, the heart of the city's Japanese community. After the death of the founder in 1951, his son Takeo inherited both the property and the priesthood. After Takeo's death, the property was sold and the shrine was relocated to Waipahu Cultural Garden in 1979 to make way for a sporting goods store.

The relocated shrine is in a rural rather than urban setting and the surrounding garden lacks several of its original elements, including its water purification basin (chōzuya or temizuya), its paired stone images of guardian lions and fox deities, and its original torii, although a new torii has been reconstructed at the new site. For its 100th anniversary in 2014, it received a new roof and won a Historic Preservation Honor Award.

== Gallery ==
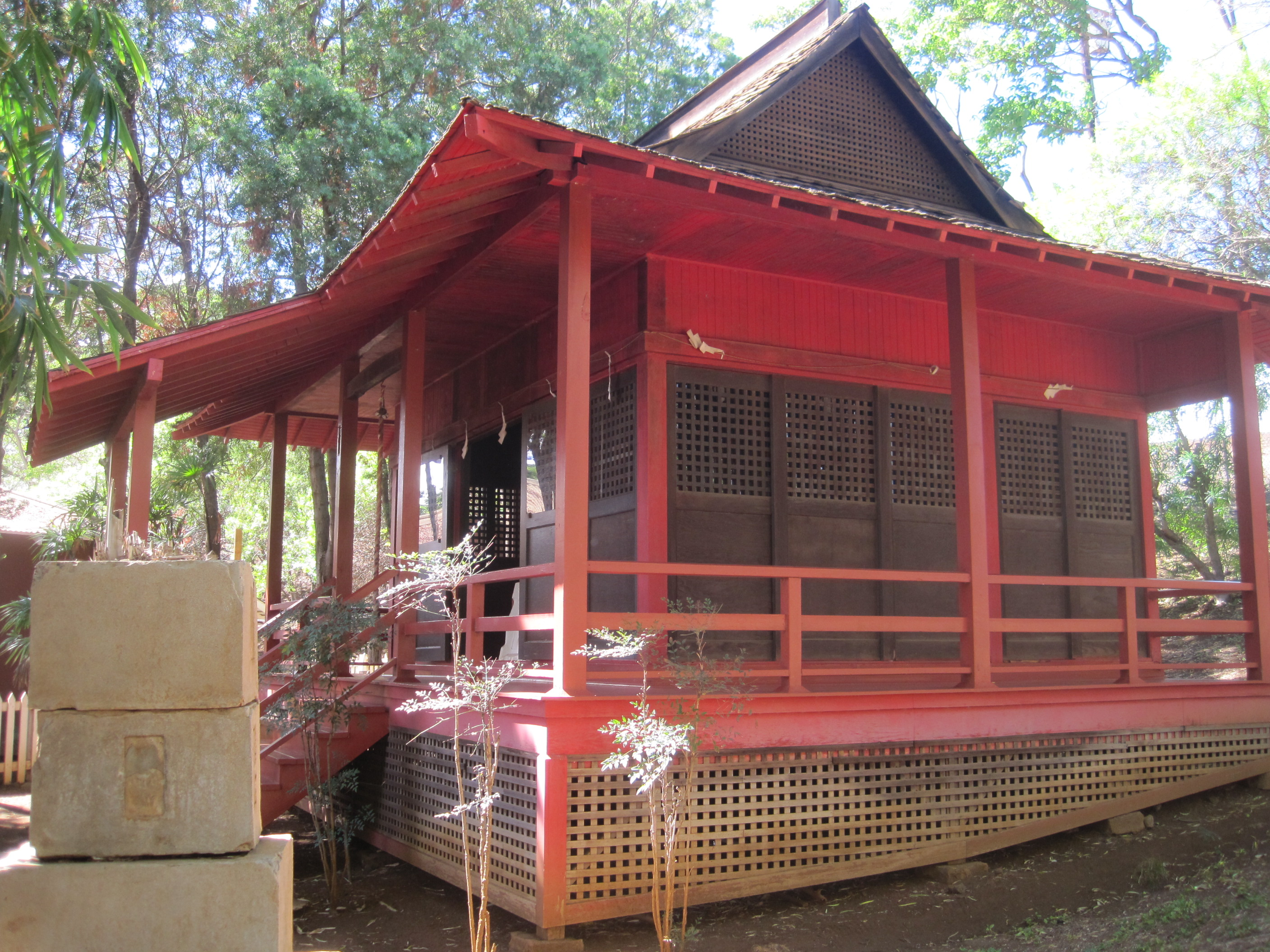
Side view of main building

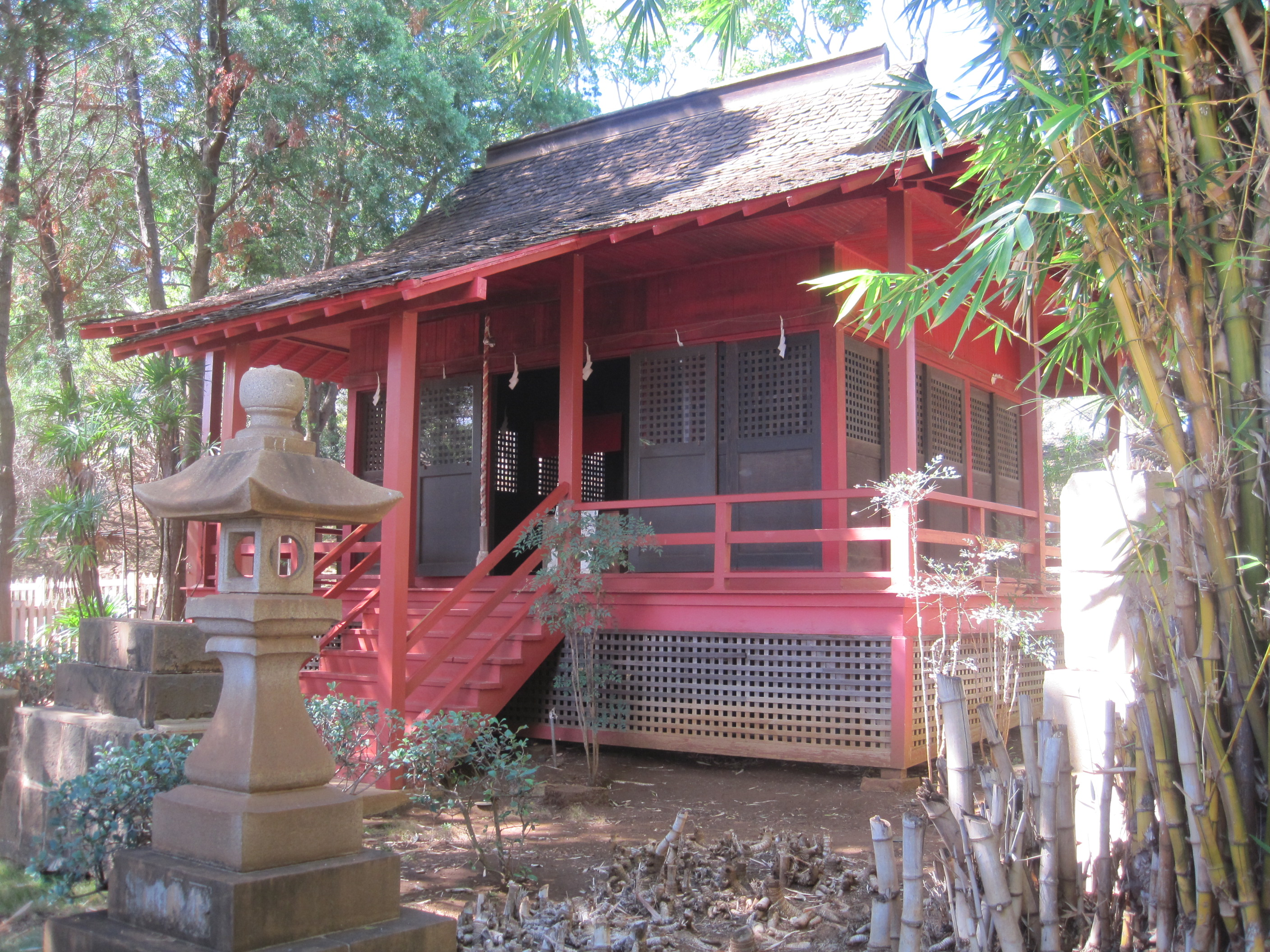
View from bamboo thicket

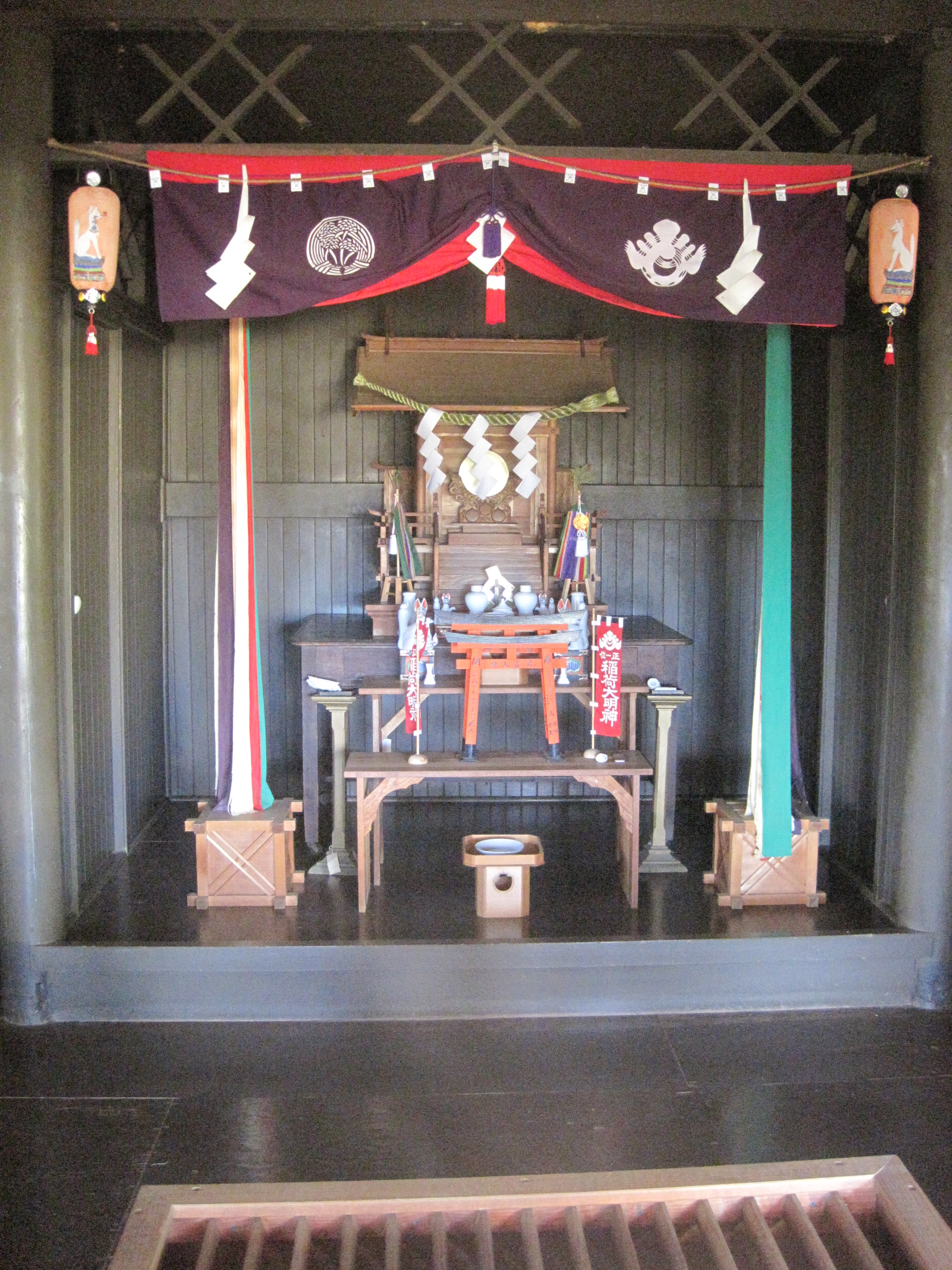
Inner altar behind offering box

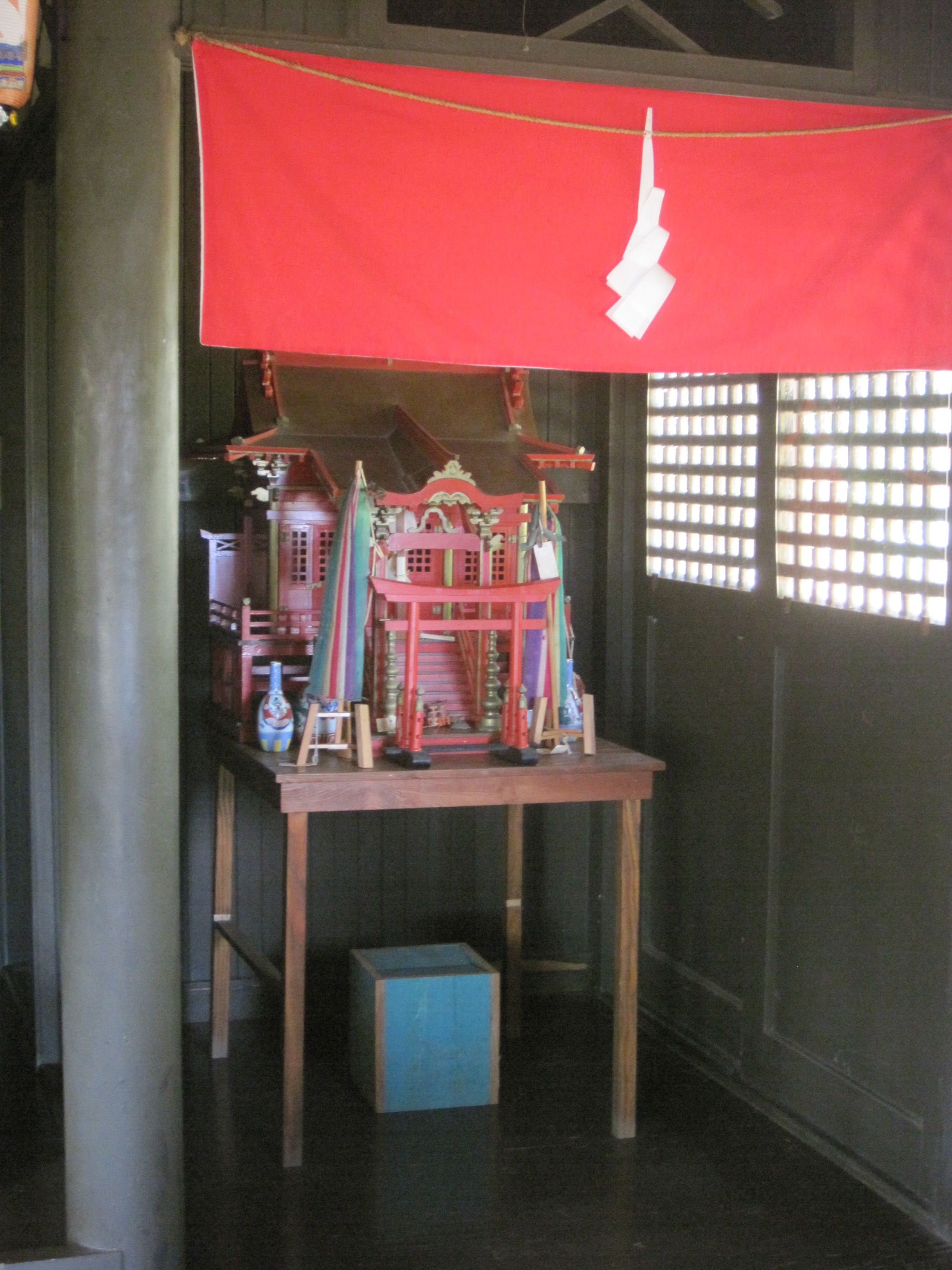
Scale model of an Inari shrine beside altar
