= Sakiko Kanase =

Japanese hostess, model, and teacher (1935–1959)

- Born: January 20, 1934; Japan
- Died: 3 October 1959 (aged 25); Jakarta, Indonesia
- Burial place: Blok P Cemetery
- Other name: Saliku Maisaroh
- Occupations: Hostess; model; teacher
- Spouse: Sukarno (m. 1958)

Sakiko Kanase (金勢さき子, Kanase Sakiko), also known as Saliku Maisaroh (サリク・マエサロ, Saliku Maesaroh), was a Japanese hostess, model, and teacher. She is best known as the competitor of Dewi Sukarno at Benibasha night club in which they both attracted the attention of President Sukarno, who later married Kanase in 1958 and Dewi in 1962.

== Early life ==
Kanase was born on January 20, 1934.

== Personal life ==
=== Marriages, family, and relationships ===
In Kyoto, Kanase met with President Sukarno after being introduced through the Kinoshita Sansho company. She later converted to Islam and changed her name to Saliku Maisaroh. Kanase later married Sukarno in 1958. Their marriage lasted until Kanase's death in October 1959.

=== Death ===
After being married for one year to President Sukarno, Kanase committed suicide at a house in Menteng, Central Jakarta, on 3 October 1959 at the age of 24, just three weeks after Dewi Sukarno's landing in Jakarta. Her disappointment in Sukarno and her embarrassment because of Dewi, who was the second hostess after herself, to become Sukarno's favorite wife. When she died, Sukarno and Dewi were in Bali. Kanase was buried on 4 October at Blok P Cemetery in South Jakarta and her funeral was managed by M.A. Sabar, whose address is Jalan Pekalongan 4, Central Jakarta, which after being traced, was the residence of Brigadier General Sabur, Sukarno's aide who later became the commander of Tjakrabirawa Regiment, presidential guard special forces. In 1977, her grave was moved to Japan by Japan consulate at the request of Kanase's parents. With the help of a businessman in Jakarta, the burial was then carried out and the removal of the body cost around 1,600 US dollars. Kanase's death at that time had attracted the attention of the Japanese press. Shūkan Shinchō, a famous weekly news magazine in Tokyo, wrote a special report on the mystery of Kanase's death in its February 1960 edition. The magazine also mentioned the presence of the two Japanese women in Jakarta, Kanase and Dewi, who were related to the business competition between Kinoshita Sansho and the Tonichi company.

Dewi later acknowledge on the existence of Kanase on 3 November 1959 after completing the ceremony in the Istana Negara room by facing the Quran and kris and then swearing in front of it witnessed by the adjutant Sabur and the head of the guard Mangli. He then asked Sukarno about Kanase who then replied that she had died.

== Career ==
Kanase started her career as a hostess and model at Benibasha night club in Tokyo, the same club which was Dewi Sukarno work at before she moved to Copacabana night club. In November 1958, she came to Jakarta using the name Saliku Maisaroh to work as a teacher for a daughter of Kinoshita Sansho staff.
