= Staffan Horito =

Indonesian footballer (born 2006)

Personal information
- Full name: Staffan Qabiel Horito
- Date of birth: 21 July 2006 (age 20)
- Place of birth: Jakarta, Indonesia
- Height: 1.73 m (5 ft 8 in)
- Positions: Full-back; winger; midfielder

Team information
- Current team: Kaptiva Sports Academy
- Number: 6

Youth career
- Years: Team
- 2021–2022: Persija Barat
- 2022–2023: Sant Cugat
- 2023–: Kaptiva Sports Academy

Staffan Qabiel Horito (born 21 July 2006) is an Indonesian footballer who plays as a full-back for Spanish side Sant Cugat.

== Club career ==
Born in Jakarta, Horito began his career with local sides in the country, including Persija Barat, before a move to Spain, where he joined the academy of Sant Cugat, an affiliate of Barcelona. Assigned to the club's Juvenil C side for the 2022–23 season, he played in thirty out of thirty-four games, helping Sant Cugat to the Juvenil Segona Divisío title.

In August 2023, he was invited on trial with La Liga side Celta de Vigo.

== International career ==
In July 2023, he was called up by manager Bima Sakti to the Indonesian under-17 side as one of thirty-four players summoned for a training camp. He was removed from the squad later in the same month, having not met the expected standard of quality.

== Personal life ==
Horito's paternal grandfather is from the Dayak tribe; born in Sampit he is of Japanese descent. His paternal grandmother is from Malang, and is of Chinese descent. His maternal grandparents are from Suruh in Salatiga.

He is trilingual, speaking Indonesian, English and Spanish.
