= Jakarta Japanese School =

- ジャカルタ日本人学校; Sekolah Jepang Jakarta

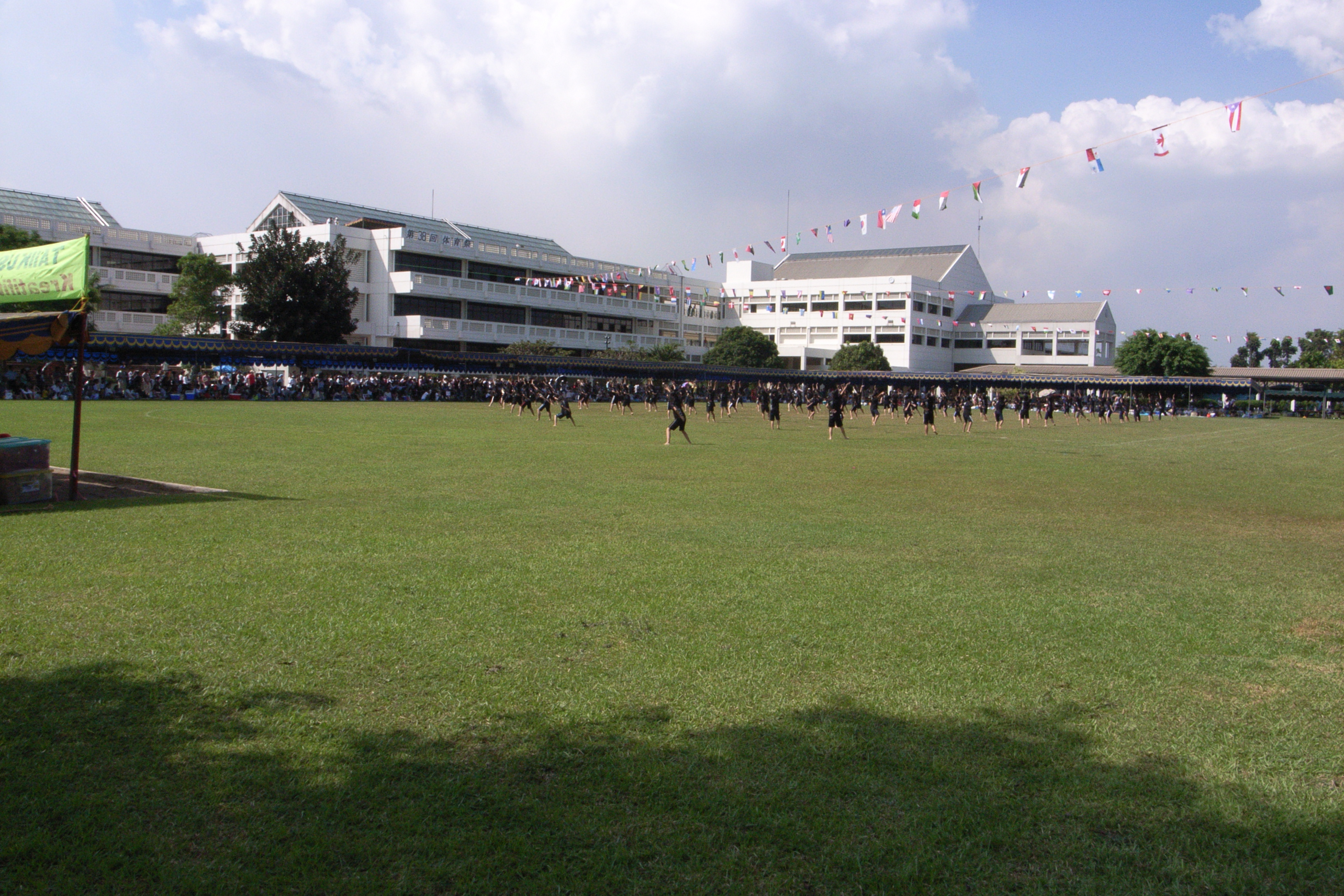
- Classroom building

Location
- JL.Titihan Raya, Bintaro Jaya Sektor 9, Perigi Lama, Pondok Aren, South Tangerang 15227; Indonesia
- Coordinates: 6.285043299999999°S 106.70053340000004°E

Information
- Type: Japanese international school
- Established: 1969; 1996 (current location)
- Website: jjs.or.id

The Jakarta Japanese School (JJS; ジャカルタ日本人学校 Jakaruta Nihonjin Gakkō; Indonesian: Sekolah Jepang Jakarta) is a Japanese international school in Pondok Aren, South Tangerang, Indonesia. It is regionally located in the Greater Jakarta area.

== Notable alumni ==
- Kenjiro Tsuda, voice actor
- Yoko Kamio, manga artist

== See also ==
- Japanese migration to Indonesia
