= San Marino Shrine =

Shinto shrine in Serravalle, San Marino

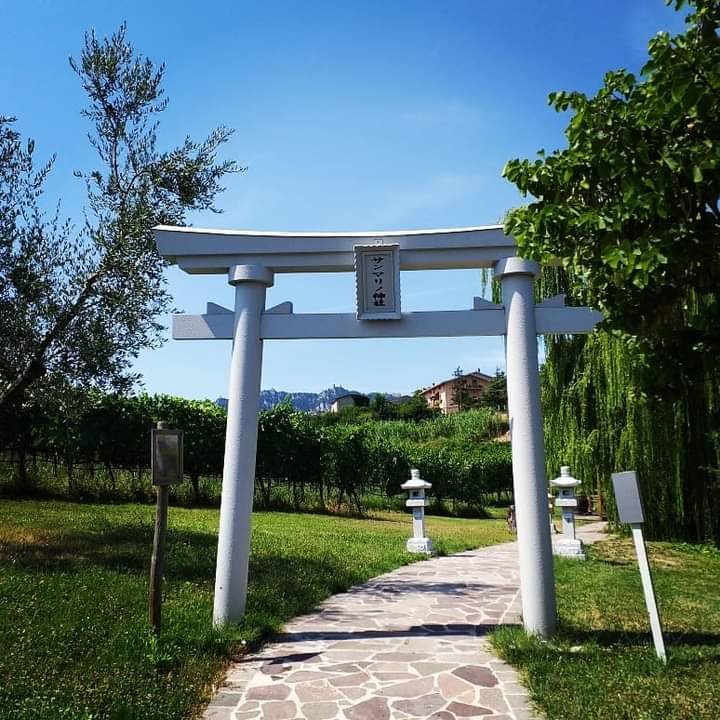
- Torii of the Shinto Shrine of San Marino

- Location within San Marino

Religion
- Affiliation: Shinto
- Deity: Amaterasu

Location
- Interactive map of San Marino Shrine
- Coordinates: 43°57′29″N 12°28′56″E

Architecture
- Style: shinmei-zukuri
- Established: 2014

Website
- https://www.sanmarino-jinja.com/

San Marino Shrine (Japanese: サンマリノ神社, Hepburn: San Marino Jinja) is a shrine in Serravalle, Republic of San Marino. It is the first official Shinto shrine in Europe supported by the Association of Shinto Shrines when the shrine was established.

== History ==
Manlio Cadero planned the construction of the shrine in consultation with the Jinja Honcho. It was financed through the sale of 'Japan-San Marino Friendship Charity Gold Coins'.

The shrine was founded on 21 June 2014, and opened to the public the following day. The San Marino shrine was inaugurated in the presence of 150 personalities including the president of the Association of Shinto Shrines and Yoko Kishi, mother of the former Prime Minister of Japan Shinzō Abe and daughter of Prime Minister Nobusuke Kishi. The shrine was established at the initiative of the Japan San Marino Friendship Society (JSFS) in commemoration of the victims of the 2011 Tōhoku earthquake and tsunami.

The Association of Shinto Shrines considers San Marino Jinja as the first official shrine in Europe. However, as not all shrines fall under Association, the "Yamakage Shinto Holland Saigu" in The Netherlands, established in 1980 by the Japanese Dutch Shinzen Foundation, is actually the first jinja in Europe.

From 2019, marriages recognized by the Civil Registry office of the Republic of San Marino can be celebrated there, therefore valid throughout the world.

== Main shrine ==
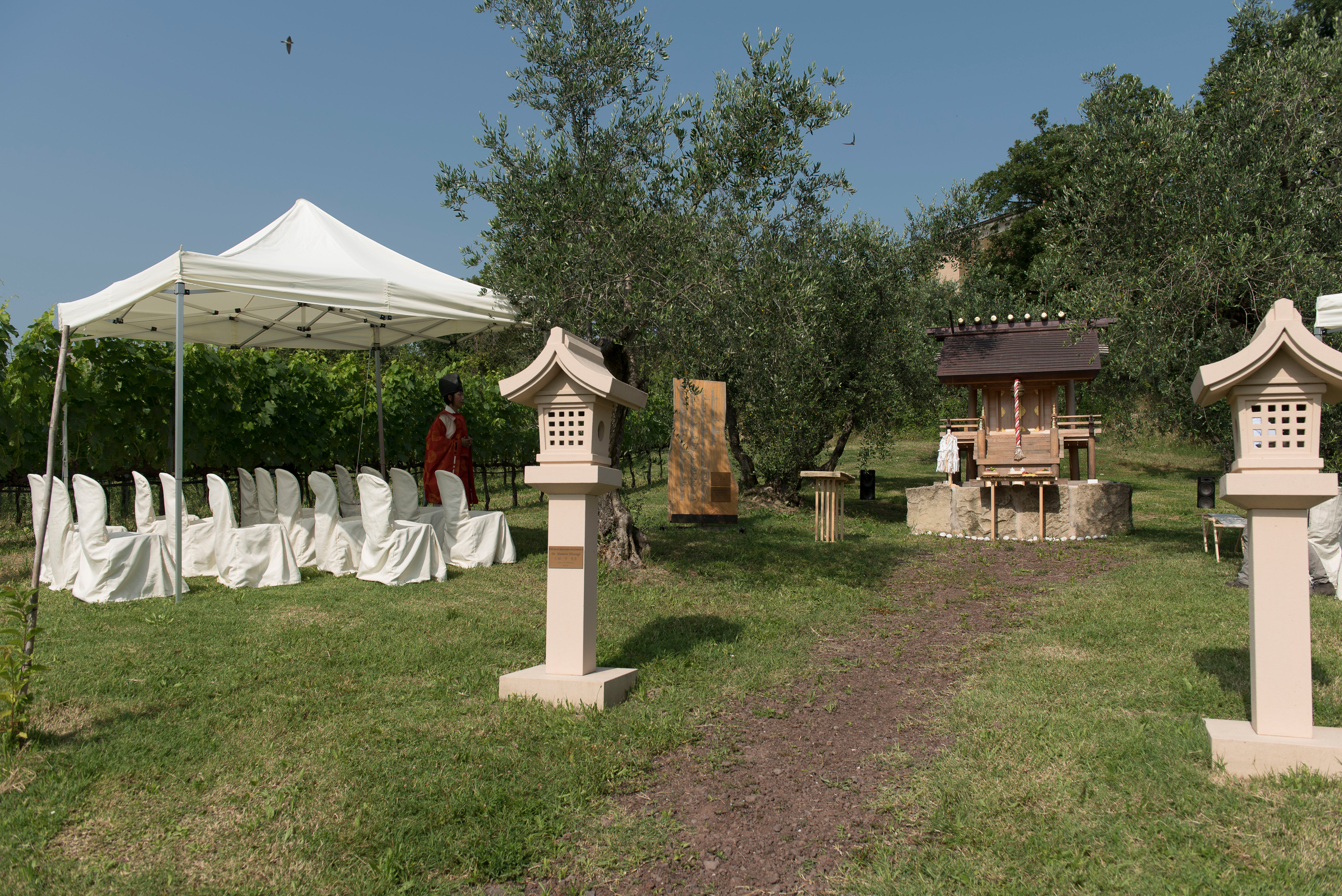
The sanctuary of San Marino with the tōrō (stone lanterns) at its entrance.

The style of the main hall is shinmei-zukuri, the same as that of the Ise Jingu. In the shrine area there are also a torii (portal), a pair of tōrō (lanterns) and a small chōzuya (ablution fountain), all very frequent elements in Shinto architecture. The shine of San Marino consists of a small square-based monument with a side of 2.5 meters and made in Japan with cedar wood. Parts of the main hall were built using wood from the Ise Jingu shrine.

The main hall was built in Japan, dismantled and transported by sea to San Marino, where it was rebuilt by Japanese architects on a foundation made of typical sandstone.

The temple is surrounded by numerous rows of vines, set against the backdrop of the Mediterranean mountains and landscapes.

== Deities ==
The Shrine of San Marino is consecrated to the kami Amaterasu, the personification of the Sun, the primary source of life on Earth. She is thus the most important deity of the Shinto pantheon, as she is also a traditional ancestor of Japanese emperors. starting with the legendary Jimmu, her great-grandson.

== Shinto priest ==
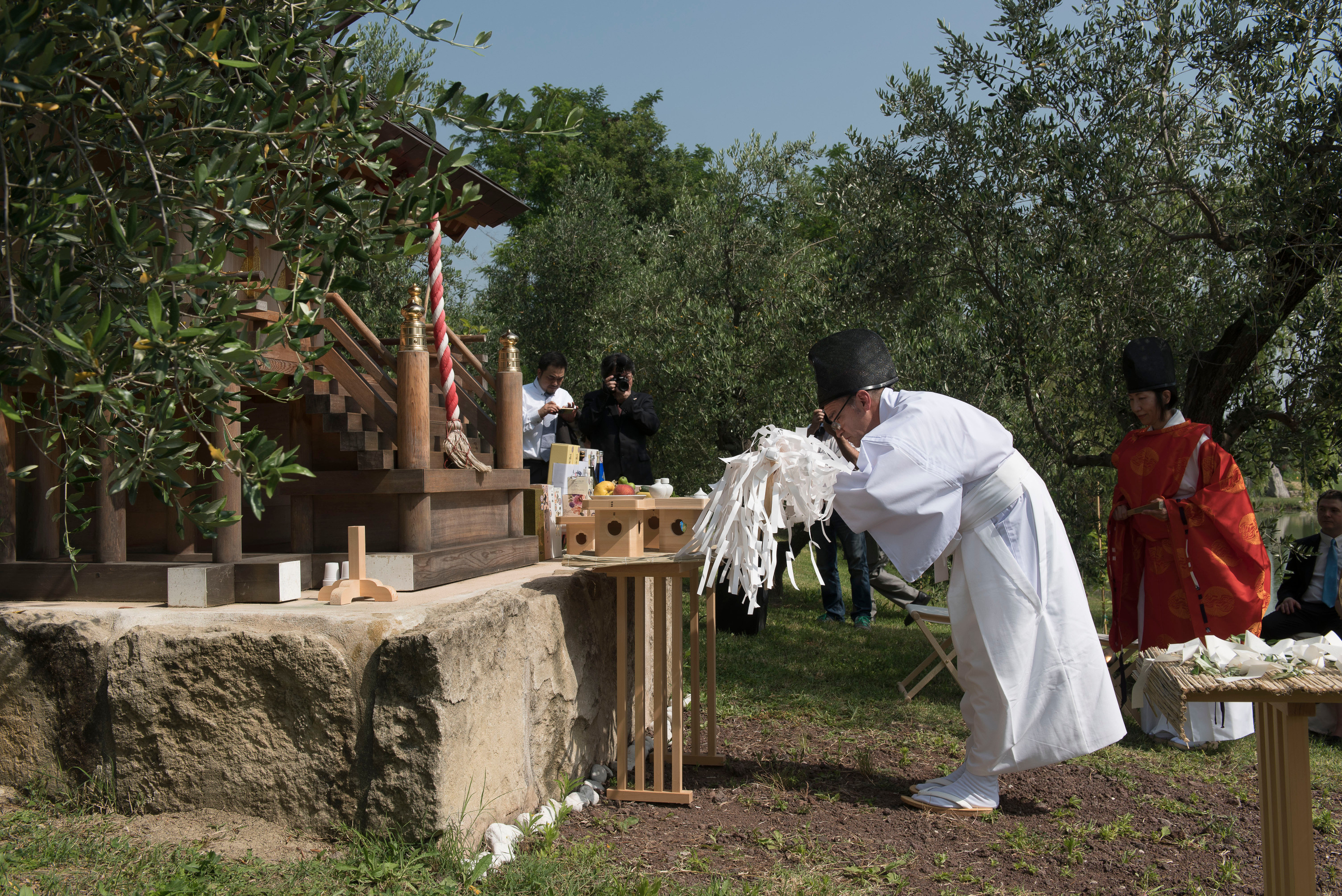
Chief priest Francesco Brigante performs a Shinto ritual at San Marino Shrine (2016)

The miyazukasa (chief Shinto priest) of the San Marino Shrine is Francesco Brigante (フランチェスコ・ブリガンテ, Furanchesuko Burigante), who received his Shinto priesthood status from the Shinto Shrine Honcho and was appointed as chief priest in 2013 and awarded the bushidō honour. He is a local San Marino hotel owner who trained at Yudonosan Shrine in Yamagata Prefecture.

Currently, the shrine is headed by Yoshiki Jinguji, who obtained his priesthood qualification to serve the San Marino Shrine at the Dewa Sanzan Shrine (Mt. Haguro) priesthood training school, also in Tsuruoka City, Yamagata Prefecture.
