= Izumo Taishakyo Mission of Hawaii =

Shinto shrine in Honolulu, Hawaii

Hawaii Izumo Taisha 布哇出雲大社 ハワイ出雲大社
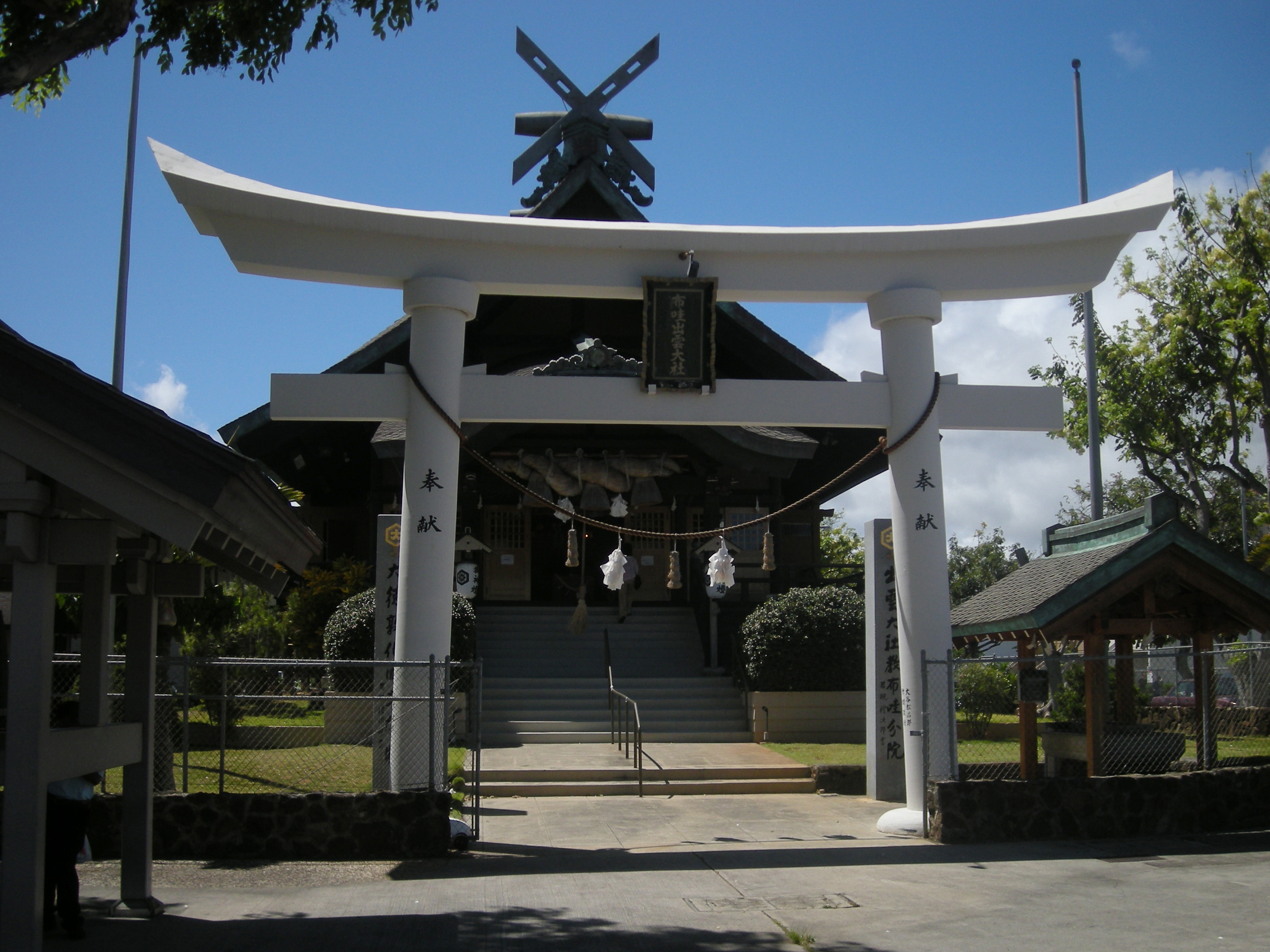

- Location within Hawaii

Religion
- Affiliation: Shinto
- Deity: Ōkuninushi, Hawaii Ubusuna-no-Kami
- Leadership: Bishop Daiya Amano; Rev. Jun Miyasaka

Location
- Location: 215 N Kukui St, Honolulu, HI 96817
- Coordinates: 21°18′55.984″N 157°51′39.682″W

Architecture
- Style: Taisha-zukuri
- Established: 1906

Website
- www.izumotaishahawaii.com

The Izumo Taishakyo Mission is a Shinto shrine located in downtown Honolulu, Hawaii. It is one of the few active Shinto shrines in the United States. The wooden A-frame structure was inspired by Shimane Prefecture's classical Japanese shrine Izumo-taisha. It was designed by architect Hego Fuchino and built by master carpenter Ichisaburo Takata.

The primary kami of this shrine is Ōkuninushi and Hawaii Ubusuna-no-Kami. Also enshrined are Okinawa Shrine, Naminoue Shrine, Futenma Shrine, Inari Shrine, and Ebisu Shrine, and Waianae Ujigami.

The shrine is the site of the annual New Year's Day hatsumōde as well as other events throughout the year. A replica of the Hiroshima Peace Bell is on view. The annual Hiroshima Commemoration and Peace Service is held at Hawaii Izumo Taisha to commemorate the atomic bombing of Hiroshima.

== History ==
Izumo-taishakyo

Hawaii Izumo Taisha was founded in 1906 when Rev. Katsuyoshi Miyao opened a temporary worship site on Aala Street near Aala Park on 26 September 1906. A temporary shrine building was completed on 25 August 1907. A permanent shrine building was completed in 1922. By 1941, there were branches of Izumo Taishakyo operating in Hilo, Wailuku, Waipahu, Pearl City, Honouliuli, Ewa Lower Camp, Aiea, and Kakaako.

The shrine was closed on 7 December 1941 at the outset of World War II. The shrine was illegally acquired by the City and County of Honolulu in June 1942. After internment on the mainland, the priest and family returned to Hawaii in mid-December 1945. A temporary shrine was consecrated in a residence-like warehouse in McCully area of Honolulu and served as a worship site from 1946-1968.

The original shrine property was returned to the shrine organization in October 1961 as a result of lengthy legal and legislative appeals. The shrine building was moved in 1963 to its present location to make way for Federal Housing Administration redevelopment. The shrine was restored from 1968-1969 at a cost of $170,000. Funds were donated entirely by the people of Hawaii. The shrine was rededicated on 22 December 1968.

== See also ==
- Japanese Peace Bell
- Hiroshima Peace Memorial Park
- List of Shinto shrines in the United States
