= Industrial and Administrative Group =

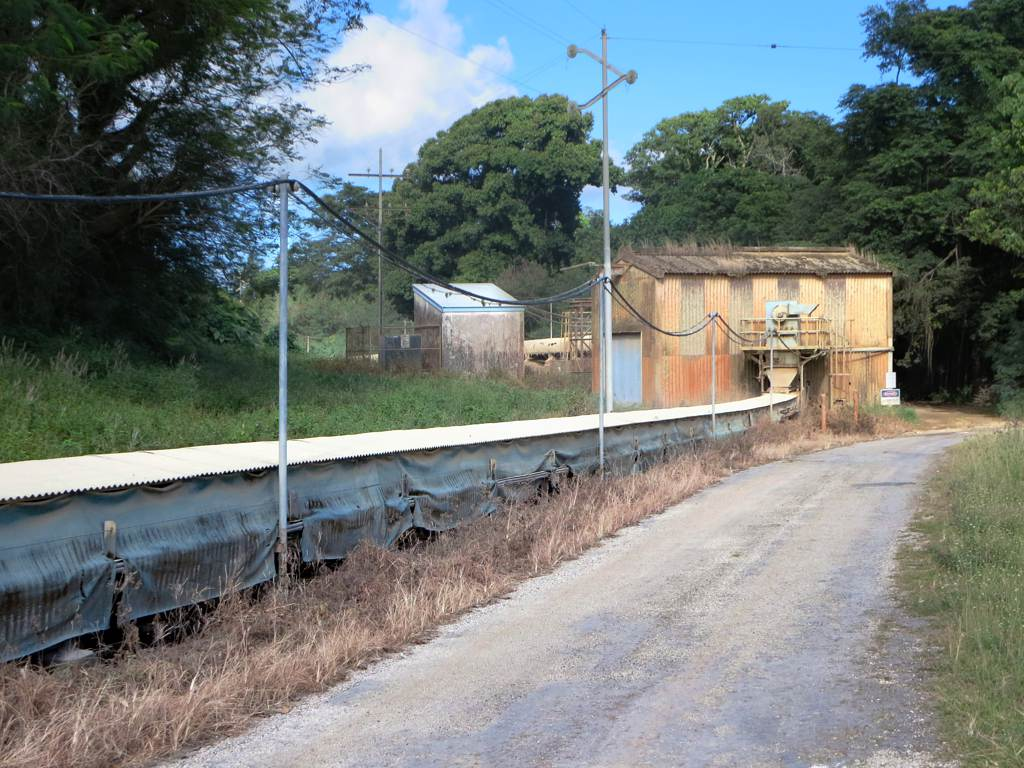
- The former phosphate conveyor belt

- Location of Christmas Island in the Indian Ocean
- Location on Christmas Island
- 10.4237°S 105.6741°E
- Location: Murray Road, Christmas Island, Australia

History
- Built: c. 1890s
- Built for: Clunies-Ross family

Commonwealth Heritage List
- Official name: Industrial and Administrative Group
- Type: Listed place (Historic)
- Designated: 22 June 2004
- Reference no.: 105246

The Industrial and Administrative Group is a heritage-listed historic precinct on Murray Road overlooking Flying Fish Cove in the Australian territory of Christmas Island. It was added to the Australian Commonwealth Heritage List on 22 June 2004.

== Description ==
The Industrial and Administrative Group comprises the former Christmas Island Club, the ruins of the former Manager's house to the west of the club, the cemetery adjacent to these ruins, the Bulk Storage and Dust Storage Sheds, carpentry shop, the Padang, Administration Office, Wireless Operator's house, the remains of the Shinto Shrine near the tennis court, the Asian Clerks' quarters, the inscription to the completion of the first road in 1894 on the rockface behind the Asian Clerks' quarters, the bases of the pre-1915 and the 1935 phosphate chutes respectively behind the Asian Clerks' quarters and behind the Malay School, the Christian Centre (former library), fuel tank in No. 1 Tank Farm displaying strafe marks, the Hardware Store, the Down Hill Conveyer from Drumsite to the Dry Storage Bins, and the phosphate loading cantilevers at the wharf.

This area has been the focus of industrial and administrative activity on the Island since its earliest occupation and includes evidence of each phase of settlement on the island. The site of Clunies-Ross' original plantation settlement has been the subject of intensive redevelopment and no above-ground evidence of it is apparent today. The one remaining indication of this phase of occupation is an inscription on the rockface, near the Asian Clerk's Quarters, which commemorates the completion of the first road on the island in 1894.

The second phase of mining and settlement on the island is represented by the Christmas Island Club, the main recreational and social focus for the Europeans on the Island; the former Manager's House which is now a ruin with only the foundations to indicate its layout; the Christian cemetery, near the Manager's House, with burials dating from 1907; the bases of the pre-1915 and 1935 phosphate chutes, the Dry Storage and Bulk Storage Sheds with overhead rail system designed to allow wagons to enter the shed on tracks elevated about 6m above the floor and dump the loose phosphate down onto the floor below; the carpentry shop which includes original sections of the island gaol built c. 1903 and one of the oldest structures on the island; the padang which was used for sporting activities since the first days of mining and as a parade ground during the Second World War; the Administration Office which formerly featured a timber balustraded upper verandah and which occupied a dominant position in keeping with the central role of mining on the island; and the Wireless Operator's House, built c. 1938. Despite the efficiency of the incline it appears that a second attempt to construct a chute system was undertaken in the 1930s. This chute ran from Drumsite near the cliff face to a point behind the present Malay Kampong. A lower level rail loading facilities were constructed for movement of the ore to the shore was constructed in conjunction with the chute, however, it appears this system was not successful and the incline remained the main system for moving the ore from the plateau to the lower terrace. Ore bins and the remnants of the cable and pulley system at the base of the 1935 chute still survive.

Later structures of historical value include the Japanese Shinto shrine remains of which only the steps survive as it was destroyed, at the request of the Islanders, by returning British troops in 1945; the Asian Clerk's Quarters as they represent an early attempt by the British Phosphate Commission to provide a higher standard of accommodation for senior Asian staff and contribute to the streetscape, and the Christian Centre as it incorporates part of the Cocos Malay Kampong built to accommodate the group of Cocos people who came to Christmas Island after World War II. More recent structures of interest include the storage tanks and Hardware Store with their evidence of Japanese strafing, and the down hill conveyer and phosphate loading cantilevers which form a strong visual focus for the area and are a constant reminder of the long term importance of phosphate mining to Christmas Island.

== Condition ==
The Christmas Island Club was partially destroyed by fire but retains its essential character as a "refuge" or retreat for the island's managerial personnel. The former Manager's House is in ruins but foundations remain to indicate its layout.

The use of buildings in the precinct is constantly changing, with some vacant buildings likely to be utilized. The decline of the mechanical and workshop activities has lessened the area's services aspect. The Administration Building is in generally good condition. The former Asian Staff Quarters are in good condition but have poor ventilation and interiors. The former Wireless Operator's Building has recently been sold and is now privately owned; there has been some stabilisation work, though more work is required. The Christmas Island Club is in fair condition, though the interior shows signs of lack of use. Houses near the Roundabout are in good condition; painting is needed. Some conservation work is required on a number of headstones in the European cemetery.

== Heritage listing ==
The Industrial and Administrative Group was listed on the Australian Commonwealth Heritage List on 22 June 2004.

This area has been the focus of industrial and administrative activity on the island since its earliest occupation and includes evidence of each successive phase of settlement and mining on the island. Some of the oldest structures are located in this area as well as rare evidence of World War ii strafing and the subsequent Japanese occupation. This area contains a number of individual structures of historical or technical significance including the Clunies Ross era road inscription, the 1903 gaol, the storage shed with overhead rail system and the remains of the Japanese shinto shrine. The Wireless Operator's House is of architectural significance and illustrates many features of south east Asian colonial architecture including features designed to improve ventilation. The phosphate conveyor and large loading cantilevers are of special significance as they form a strong visual focus for the area and along with other large industrial structures, such as the Bulk and Transit Shed, are a constant reminder of the long term importance of mining to Christmas Island
