= Rahmat Shigeru Ono =

Japanese WWII soldier and Indonesian rebel leader (1945-1949)

- 小野 茂

Personal details
- Born: Shigeru Ono (小野 茂); 26 September 1919 Ōtomari, Karafuto, Empire of Japan (now Korsakov, Russia)
- Died: 25 August 2014 (aged 94) Batu, East Java, Indonesia
- Spouse: Darkasih (m. 1950-1982; her death)
- Children: 4

Military service
- Allegiance: Empire of Japan (1939–1945); Indonesia (1945–1949)
- Branch/service: Indonesian Army
- Years of service: 1939–1949
- Rank: Major
- Battles/wars: Indonesian National Revolution

Major Haji Rahmat Shigeru Ono (26 September 1919 – 25 August 2014) was a Japanese soldier who defected and sided with Indonesia. When Japan was defeated by the Allies, Ono became one of the troops who refused to return home to Japan in disgrace and chose to join the Indonesian people to seize independence, they were known as the elite commandos of the Pasukan Gerilya Spesial (Special Guerrilla Force) under Untung Surapati's troops. Ono, known by the soubriquet "Rahmat", was the last surviving Japanese volunteer in the Indonesian Revolution.

== Guerrilla career ==
Before his left hand was slashed in a grenade explosion, Ono was known to be an expert in using the katana, once using only the blade, Ono and 9 other Japanese killed some 20 Dutch troops by hurling grenades and anti-tank bombs into the soldiers' post in Pajajaran, Malang, East Java. These guerrillas trained rebel TNI (Indonesian National Armed Forces) troops at the foot of Mount Semeru. The Dutch recognised Indonesian sovereignty on 2 November 1949.

== Personal life and death ==
In July 1950, Ono married Darkasih. Their first child was born on 24 June 1951, and was named Tutik. That same year, Ono became an Indonesian citizen. His wife died of cancer in 1982. They had four children, ten grandchildren, and six great-grandchildren.

The story of his life is told in Those Who Have Been Forgotten: Memoirs of Rahmat Shigeru Ono, A Former Japanese Soldier Who Sided with the Republic, by Eiichi Hayashi.

Ono died on 25 August 2014, aged 94, of cancer. At the time, President Susilo Bambang Yudhoyono had asked him to be present at the Merdeka Palace to celebrate the Independence of the Republic of Indonesia.
