= Daijingu Temple of Hawaii =

Shrine in Honolulu, Hawaii

Coordinates: 21.3353682°N 157.8375732°W

- ハワイ大神宮
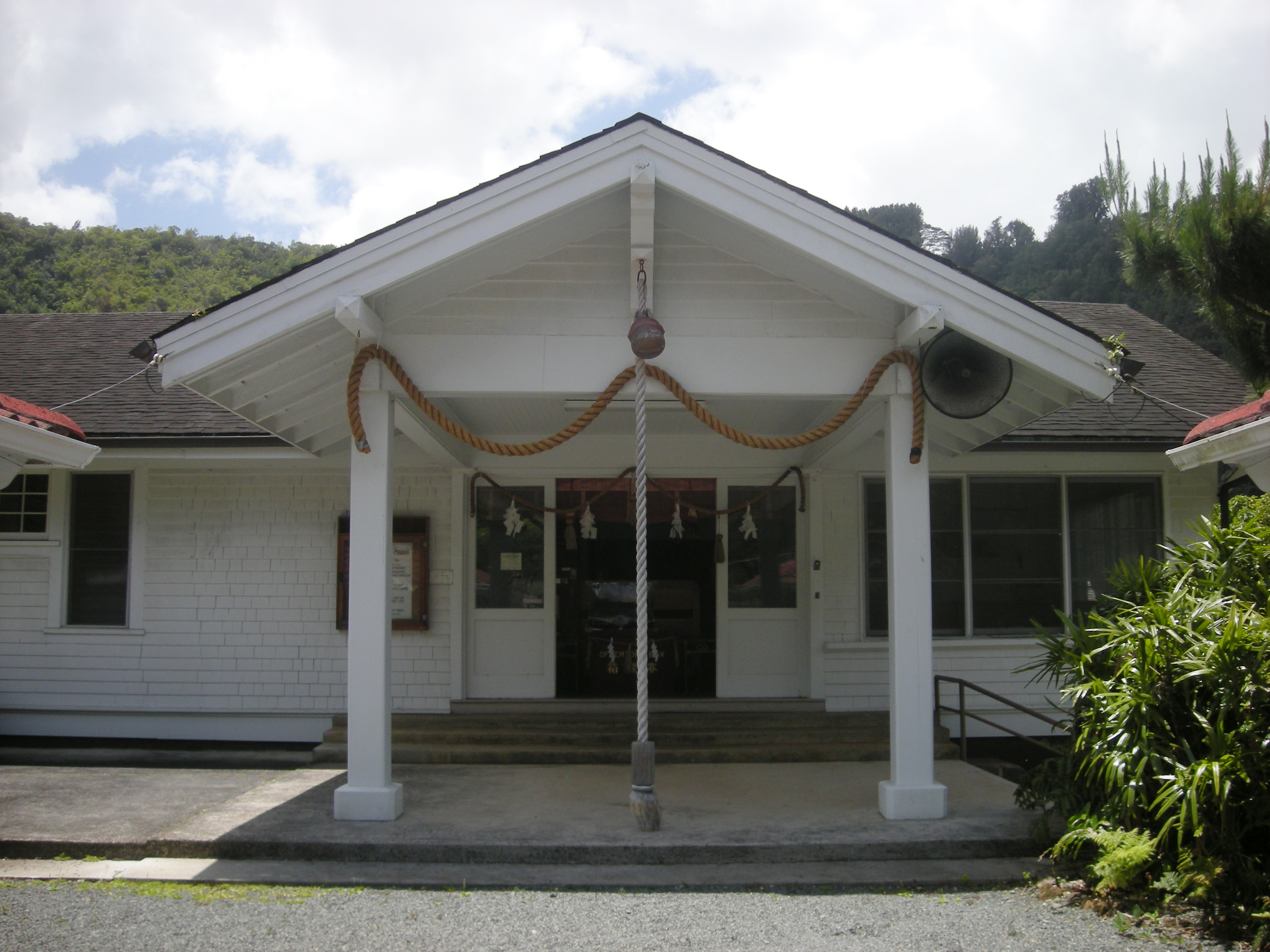

Religion
- Affiliation: Shinto
- Deity: Amaterasu

Location
- Location: 61 Puiwa Road, Honolulu, HI 96817
- Interactive map of Daijingu Temple of Hawaii

Website
- http://www.daijingutemple.org

The Daijingu Temple of Hawaii is a Shinto Shinmei shrine located in Honolulu, Oahu, Hawaii. It is also known as the Honolulu Grand Shrine (ホノルル大神宮) and is the oldest Shinto shrine on Oahu.

== History ==
In 1903, Matsue Chiya, an immigrant from Kōchi Prefecture founded the shrine on Aala Lane. Masato Kawasaki was welcomed as head priest in 1907. With the onset of World War II, the shrine's building and property was confiscated by the United States government. The Japanese community survived the war and moved the shrine to a temporary location in 1947. The present location was established November 1, 1958.

Daijingu Temple of Hawaii is the only shrine in American territory with a recorded history of holding worship services for a Japanese war hero before the start of the Pacific War. Admiral Tōgō Heihachirō was worshiped by members of the Imperial Japanese Navy and local Japanese-Americans. This has prompted scholars to consider Shinto in Hawaii as a new American religion rather than a diaspora tradition.

== Enshrined kami and historical figures ==
Presiding kami:

- Amaterasu
- Ame-no-Minakanushi

Other enshrined kami and historical figures:

- Yaoyorozu no Kami
- George Washington
- Abraham Lincoln
- King Kamehameha I
- King Kalākaua
