= Overseas Shinto =

Practice of Shinto outside Japan

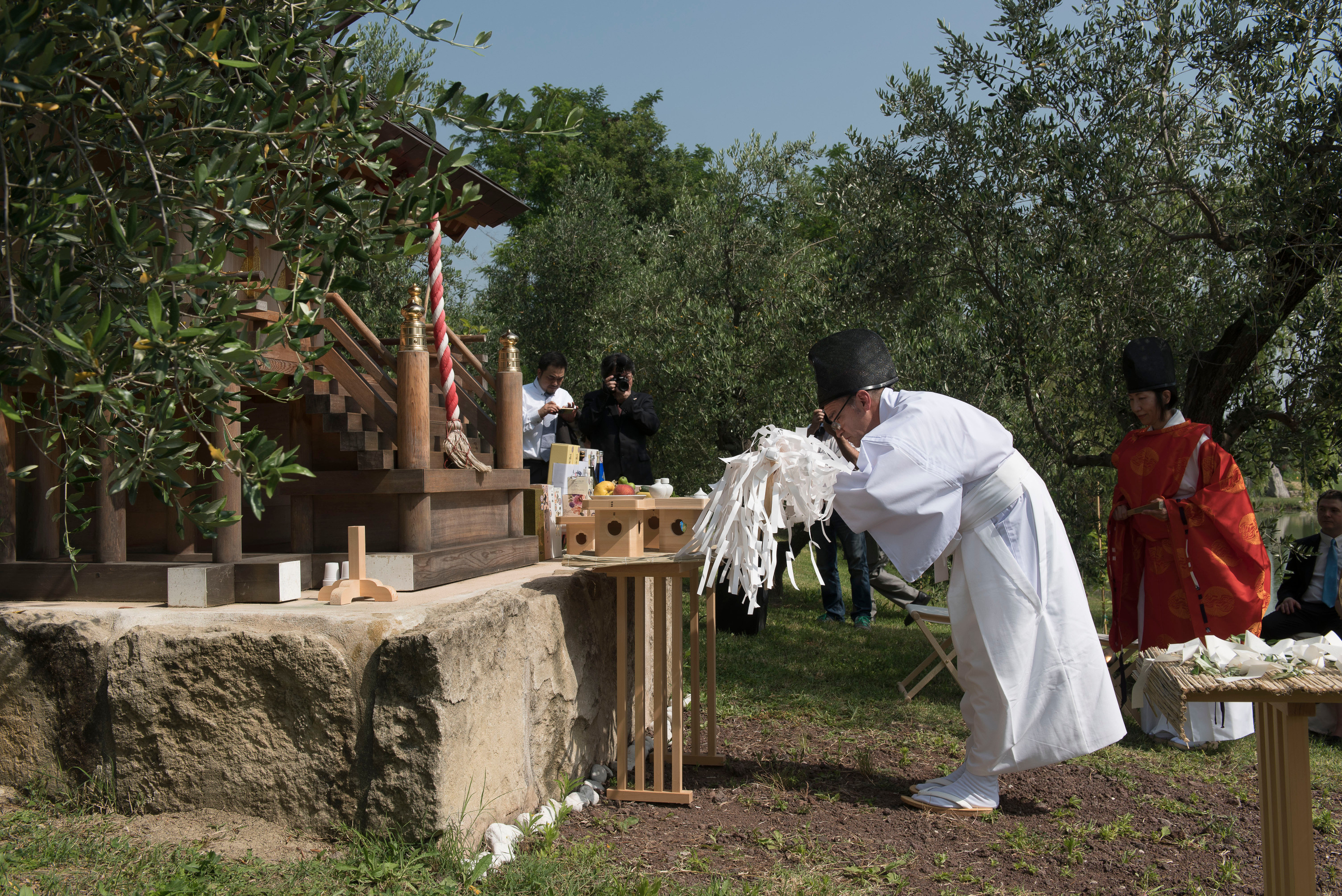
A Shinto rite carried out at a jinja in San Marino, Southern Europe

Overseas Shinto designates the practice of the Japanese religion of Shinto outside Japan itself. Shinto has spread abroad by various methods, including the imperial expansion of the Empire of Japan during the Meiji period, the migration of Japanese to other countries, and the embrace of Shinto by various non-Japanese individuals.

Jinja outside Japan are termed kaigai jinja ("overseas shrines"), a term coined by Ogasawara Shozo.

== In Europe ==
=== San Marino ===
On June 22, 2014, Europe's first Shinto shrine officially supported by the Jinja Honcho, San Marino Shrine, was opened in Serravalle, San Marino. The San Marino shrine was inaugurated in the presence of 150 personalities including the president of the Association of Shinto Shrines and Yoko Kishi, mother of the former Prime Minister of Japan Shinzō Abe and daughter of Prime Minister Nobusuke Kishi. The shrine was established in commemoration of the victims of the 2011 Tōhoku earthquake and tsunami.

=== Italy ===
Makoto no Michi, a Shinto-based Japanese new religion, has a significant presence in Italy. The history of Makoto no Michi in Italy dates back to the early 1990s. Kurihara Koshi, a Makoto no Michi member who was born in Ibaraki Prefecture in 1957, introduced Makoto no Michi to Italy in 1990. He settled in Italy and taught aikido (合気道) there. Later in 1996, Koshi started his own aikido-derived martial art called shinkido (神気道) in Rome. During the early 1990s, waterfall misogi rituals were performed at Sassinoro, Monte Pollino, and Zompo lo Schioppo. The I-no-miya Dōjō (伊宮道場, "Italy-miya Dōjō") was inaugurated in Rome in 1996, and the Tempio della Luna (Japanese: Tsuki-miya 月宮, "Temple of the Moon") was inaugurated in Assisi in 2002. As of 2024, there are approximately 100 Makoto no Michi members in Italy.

=== Netherlands ===
Yamakage Shinto, a Sect Shinto-based shinshūkyō (Japanese new religion), has a shrine called Yamagake Shintō Nichiran Shinzensaigū (山蔭神道日蘭親善斎宮) in Amsterdam, the Netherlands. It is led by Paul de Leeuw, a Dutch Shinto priest.

== In Asia ==
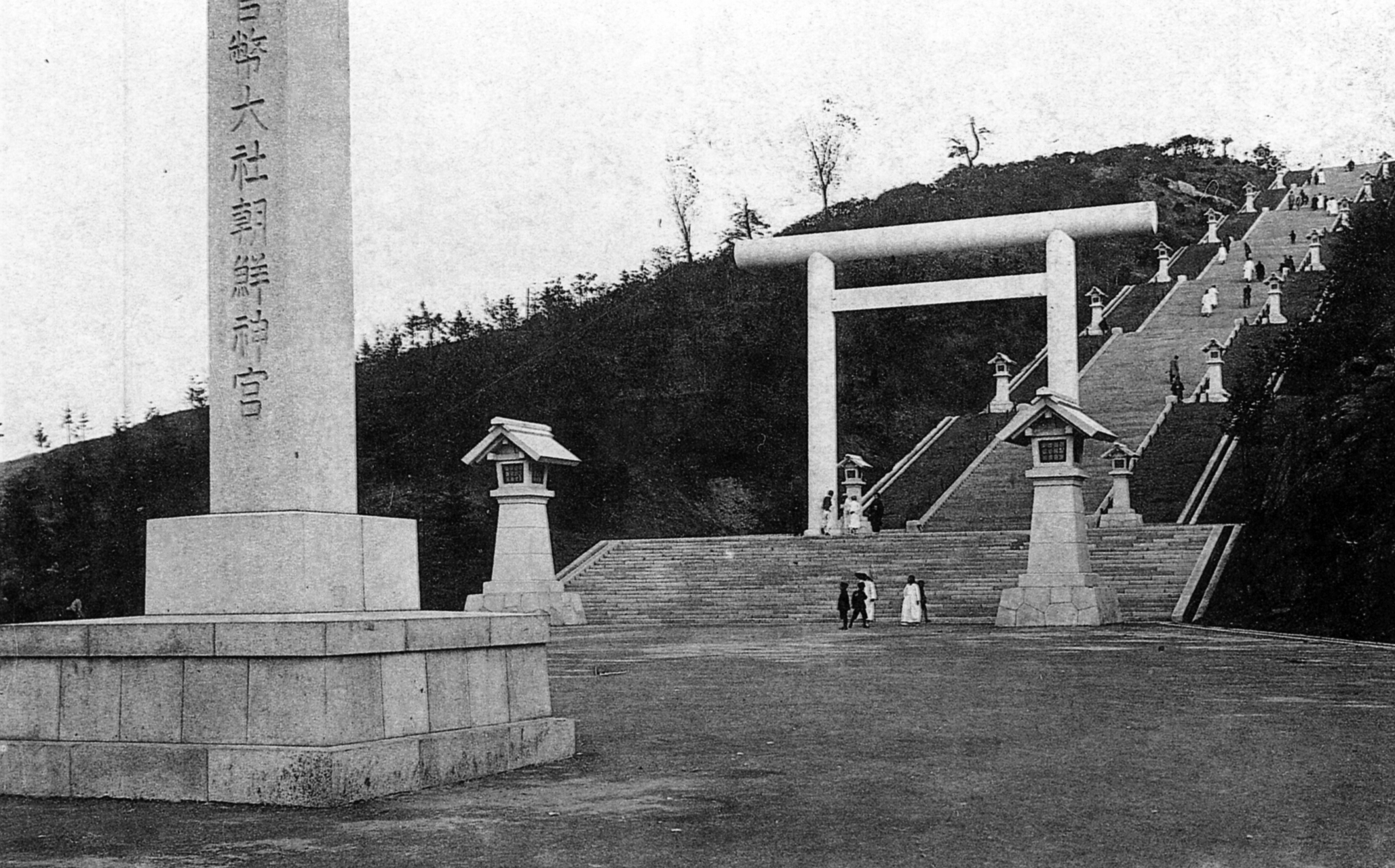
The Chōsen Jingū in Seoul, Korea, established during the Japanese occupation of the peninsula

In Japanese-controlled territories (China, Korea, the Pacific Islands, Taiwan, Manchukuo and Karafuto Prefecture), shrines were erected by both Japanese settlers and colonial authorities. Most of the sanctuaries were built by settlers, but many of them later received government recognition and funding. At first, Japanese communities built jinja for their use, often using ritual objects from their old shrines. In 1900, the Japanese authorities erected the first large shrine in the colonies, it became Taiwan Grand Shrine. It was followed by other major shrines, such as Chōsen Shrine in Korea and Karafuto Shrine on Sakhalin. These shrines were built by decree of the governor and without consultation with the Shinto clergy, and their policies were determined by the military.

=== Southeast Asia ===
During the Second World War, the expansion of Japanese influence in Southeast Asia led to the construction of Shinto shrines as part of the imposition of State Shinto. Countries including the Philippines, Singapore, Malaya, Borneo, and Indonesia saw the establishment of such sites. In Singapore, Syonan Shrine was formerly built to commemorate the many Japanese soldiers and military personnel who fell in the Japanese conquest of Singapore.

In Indonesia, a total of 11 shrines were built. Among the most notable were Chinnan Shrine in Malang, Java, which was initially built to be the southernmost Shinto shrine in Asia and Hirohara Shrine in Medan, regarded as one of the last remaining Shinto shrines in Southeast Asia that date from before 1945. Hirohara Shrine featured distinctive rites associated with wartime devotion and reverence for the imperial family, originating from its foundation by the Imperial Guard. Among these were the performance of the Great Ceremony and the practice of Miyagi yohai, a form of worship directed toward the imperial palace from afar.

Another shrine that still survived is Yorioka Shrine in Malaysia, Sarawak, which built around 1912‒1923 by a Japanese rubber plantation worker in Samarahan but abandoned after the World War II. The shrine were rediscovered in 1982 by a Japanese woman named Ms. Sakai and restored it in collaboration with the Rotary Club Tokyo Haneda in 2019. This make Yorioka Shrine as the oldest suriviving shrine in the Southeast Asia.

== In the Americas ==
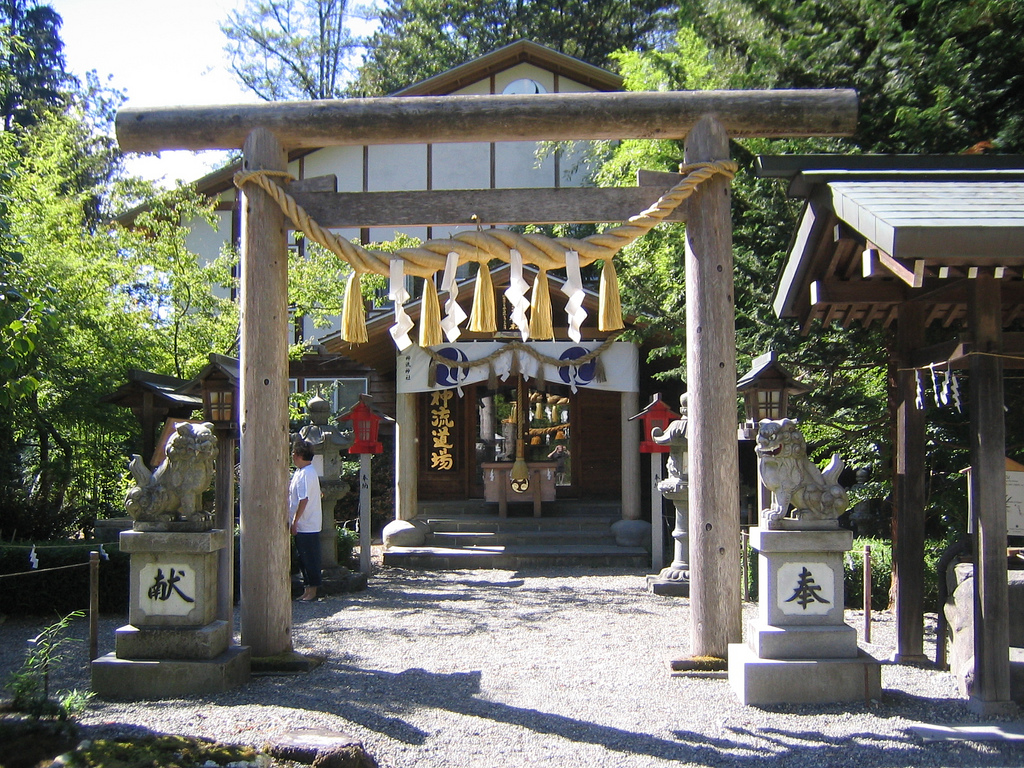
Tsubaki Grand Shrine of America circa 2007. One of the largest Overseas Shinto Shrines. It closed in 2023.

=== United States ===
Shinto Shrines, and Shintoism in general, has a long history in the United States. Shintoism was brought to Hawaii and the US West Coast by Japanese immigration in the 19th and 20th century. Immigrants from Japan brought their religious beliefs and practices, including Buddhism and Shinto, with them. Due to the events of World War 2, Americans grew suspicious of Shinto because of its use by Japanese leaders to justify increasing military aggression and, among other groups, was placed on the Attorney General's proscribed list. The Attorney Generals List was a collection of Subversive Organizations created to identify groups considered sympathetic to enemy powers or disloyal to the United States. This made it difficult for Shinto Shrines to be built and properly maintained and caused Shintoism to struggle to survive. Specifically after The Attack on Pearl Harbor Shinto priests were investigated by the US government which resulted in many Japanese Americans getting rid of Japanese cultural artifacts. At some Shinto shrines, Japanese residents in Hawaii went so far as to enshrine the spirit of George Washington to demonstrate their loyalty to the United States. In other cases, Japanese Americans focused on adapting to local religions and independent movements such as Konkokyo, which already had a presence in the diaspora Shinto Shrines struggled because of this rejection of the religion, however in truth many Shrines, such as Kotohira Jinsha Dazaifu Tenmangu, did not receive state funding from Imperial Japan. Despite this, the suspicion and aversion to Shinto Shrines from Japanese and other Americans did cause Shrines to shut down, such as a second Kotohira shrine located on Koula Street in Kaka‘ako that chose to dissolve in 1944 because of this wartime pressure. Many years later on October 14, 1955, Shinto Shrines were removed/redesignated from this prescribed list, and were no longer seen as restricted and a threat by the U.S. government.

The first Shinto shrine in Hawaii was Hilo Daijingu, built in 1898. It is known that shortly before the attack on Pearl Harbor on December 7, 1941, Japanese Shintoists in Hawaii held ceremonies in honor of the former commander-in-chief of the Japanese fleet, Tōgō Heihachirō. One of the shrines, built at the beginning of the 20th century, was subordinate to both the Japanese authorities responsible for the shrine system and the American authorities, since it was registered in the state as a non-profit organization. American Shintoists were culturally influenced by their local environment. As stated earlier, the spirits of George Washington and Hawaiian King Kamehameha I entered the local pantheon of Hawaiian Shinto. The few shrines on the West Coast of the United States were not restored after the war.

=== Brazil ===
Two Shinto shrines were built in Brazil before the outbreak of World War II, both in the state of São Paulo. The first one was built in 1920 by Uetsuka Shuhei in the city of Promissão. The second temple was built by immigrants in the municipality of Bastos 18 years later. Most emigrants performed rituals of worshiping the gods with their families, and less often with their neighbors. 11 major shrines are still located in Brazil.

== In Oceania ==
=== Micronesia ===
Shinto shrines dating from during or after World War II exist in some Micronesian countries.

== In Africa ==
Some Shinto-inspired new religions have gained ground in various countries in Sub-Saharan Africa. For example, there are Tenrikyo churches in the Republic of the Congo and in Kenya.
