= Indonesians in Japan =

Indonesians in Japan 在日インドネシア人 Orang Indonesia di Jepang
Total population
- 307,456 (in June, 2026)

Regions with significant populations
- Tokyo (Meguro), Aichi (Chūkyō, Toyota), Osaka, Saitama, Chiba, Okinawa (Naha), Fukuoka, Yokohama, Shizuoka, Hiroshima, Kobe

Languages
- Japanese, Indonesian, various languages of Indonesia

Religion
- Islam · Christianity · Buddhism · Hinduism · Shintoism

Indonesians in Japan (在日インドネシア人, Zainichi Indoneshiajin; Indonesian: orang Indonesia di Jepang) form Japan's largest immigrant group from a Muslim-majority country. As of June 2026, Japanese government figures recorded 307,456 legal residents of Indonesian nationality.

== Demography and distribution ==
Indonesians in Japan tend to be younger than other Muslim migrants; 64.5% of legal residents are recorded to be between 20 and 30 years old, whereas the majority of the other large Muslim migrant groups (Iranians, Bangladeshis, and Pakistanis) are between 30 and 40 years old. 37% of legal residents live in the Kantō region, a much smaller proportion than for other Muslim migrants; that includes 2,175 people in Tokyo itself, 1,236 in Saitama, 1,204 in Ibaraki, 1,002 in Kanagawa, 845 in Chiba, 519 in Gunma, and 244 in Tochigi. The Keihanshin area and the Chūkyō Metropolitan Area, each have roughly 10% of Japan's Indonesian population; a further 6% can be found in both Nagano Prefecture and Shizuoka Prefecture. The remainder are scattered throughout the other prefectures, with between 30 and 500 in each one.

In 1998 the chief of a factory association in Oarai has invited Japanese (Okinawans) descendants and migrants from North Sulawesi to work for seafood industries. Majority of the Indonesians were later arrested for being undocumented migrants and were sent back.

== Education ==
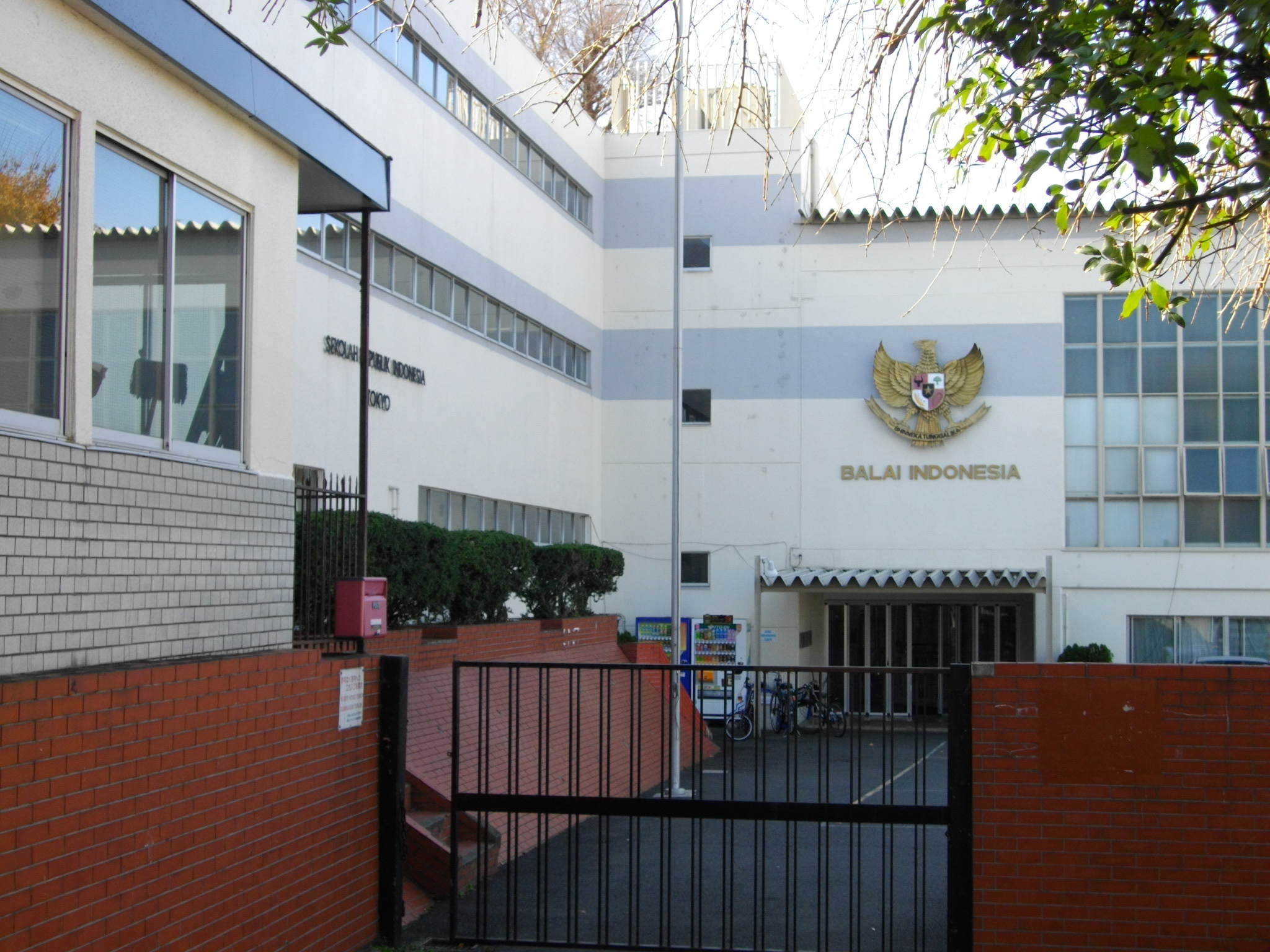
Tokyo Republic of Indonesia School

The Tokyo Republic of Indonesia School, an Indonesian international school, is in Tokyo.

== Business and employment ==
Some Indonesians in Japan run used car export businesses. This trend was believed to have begun in the late 1970s, when one Indonesian working in Japan sent a car back to his homeland. The potential for doing business in used cars also attracted more Indonesians to come to Japan in the 1990s.

== Notable people ==
- Ricky Yacobi (1963-2020) – Professional footballer
- Riki Matsuda – Professional footballer
- Riku Matsuda – Professional footballer
- Ryu Nugraha – Professional footballer
- Hana Kimura (1997-2020) – Professional wrestler
- Batara Eto – Businessman, co-founder of Mixi
- Dewi Sukarno – Wife of Sukarno
- Hary Gunarto – Engineer, Writer, and Professor at the Ritsumeikan Asia Pacific University
- Moona Hoshinova – Streamer/Idol/Singer under Japanese entertainment industry Hololive
- Kobo Kanaeru – Streamer/Idol/Singer under Japanese Entertainment industry Hololive

== See also ==
- Indonesia–Japan relations
- Overseas Indonesian
- Japanese migration to Indonesia
