= Dewi Sukarno =

Japanese businesswoman, wife of Sukarno

- デヴィ スカルノ
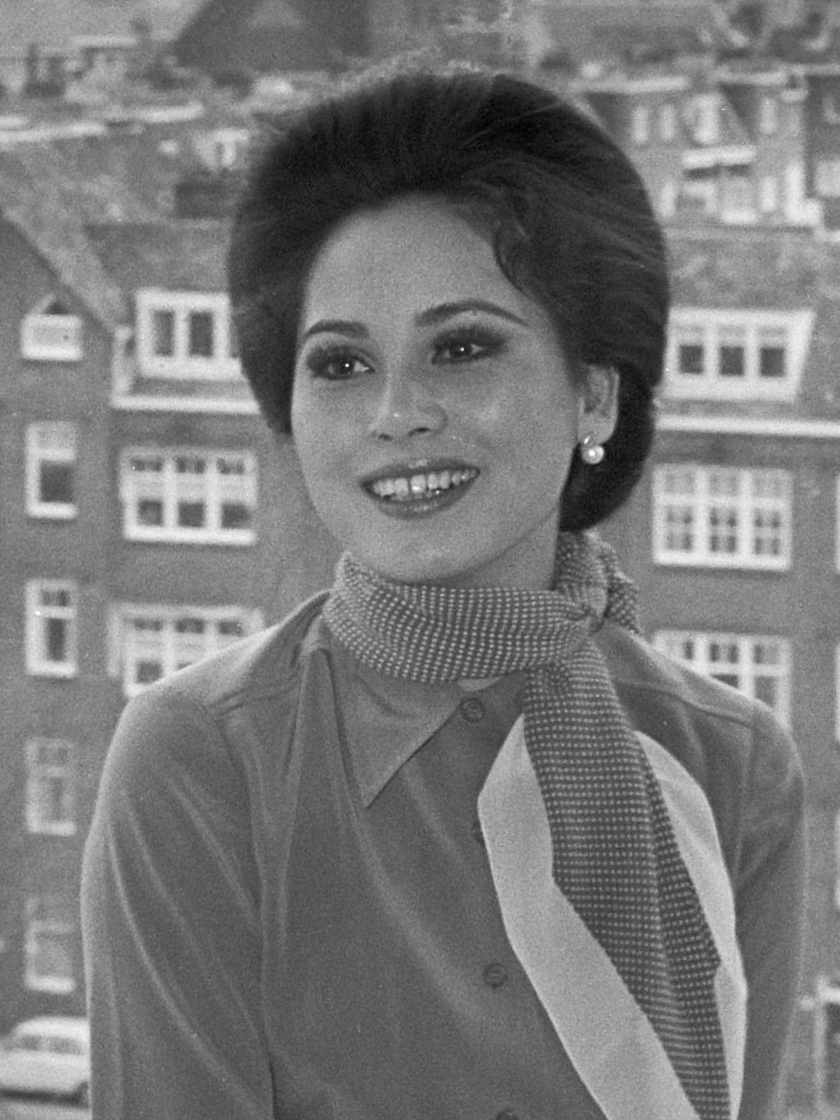
- Sukarno in Amsterdam in 1970
- Born: Naoko Nemoto 根本 七保子; February 6, 1940 (age 86); Tokyo, Empire of Japan
- Occupations: Geisha, Businesswoman, socialite, television personality, activist
- Known for: Wife of Indonesian President Sukarno
- Spouse: Sukarno (m. 1962; died 1970)
- Children: Kartika Sari Dewi Sukarno

YouTube information
- Channel: デヴィ夫人- Lady. Dewi Channel
- Years active: 2019–present
- Genre: Vlog
- Subscribers: 293 thousand
- Views: 65.7 million
- Last updated: January 20, 2026

Ratna Sari Dewi Sukarno (ラトナ サリ デヴィ スカルノ, Ratona Sari Devi Sukaruno; born Naoko Nemoto (根本 七保子, Nemoto Naoko); February 6, 1940), widely known in Japan as Dewi Fujin (デヴィ夫人, Devi Fujin; literally Lady Dewi or Madame Dewi) is a Japanese businesswoman, socialite, and television personality. She was one of the wives of the first President of Indonesia, Sukarno.

== Biography ==
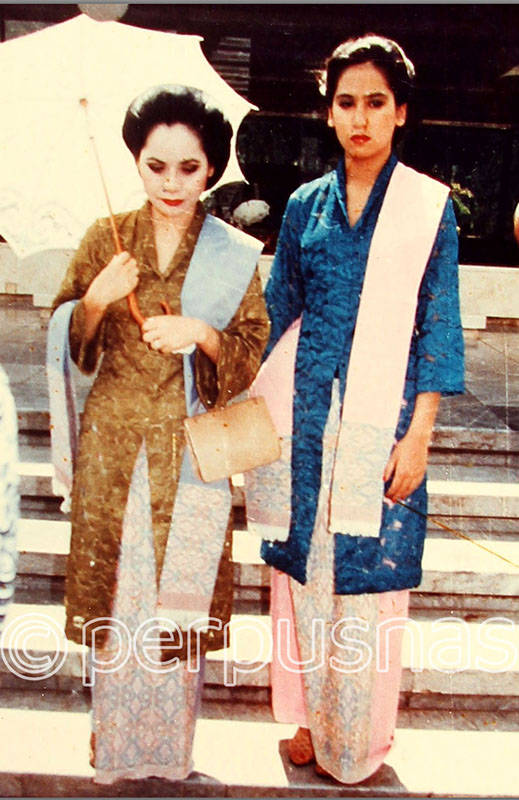
Dewi Sukarno (left) with her daughter Kartika, in October 1988.

Naoko Nemoto was born on February 6, 1940, in Tokyo, to Heishichiro Nemoto and Masako Nemoto. Nemoto had a younger brother, Yasoo Nemoto, and her mother was constantly sick. Her father was a carpenter, who died when she was 15. To make ends meet, Nemoto worked at a famous club named "Copacabana". She later chose to become a geisha.

In 1959, Nemoto, who was 19, met Sukarno, who was 38 years her senior, at the Ginza hostess bar in Tokyo, near the Imperial Hotel. Nemoto was an arts student and entertainer, while the latter was on a state visit to Japan.

Naoko married Sukarno in Indonesia in 1962 and converted to Islam. Sukarno gave her the Indonesian name "Ratna Sari Dewi Sukarno"; derived from Javanese-Sanskrit which means "the jewel essence of a goddess". They had one daughter, Kartika (born March 7, 1967, now known by the name Carina), who was Sukarno's eighth child. Sukarno was eventually overthrown by General Suharto in 1967 and died three years later.

The widowed Dewi Sukarno moved to Europe after Sukarno's ousting and has since lived in different countries, including three years in Switzerland, ten years in France, and another decade in the United States. By 2008, she had returned to Japan and lived in Shibuya, Tokyo, where she lived in her memorabilia-filled residence.

As of 2012, Dewi Sukarno enjoys caring for her 16 dogs and her cosmetics business. She makes a living doing part-time jobs, appearing on Japanese television and has served as a judge for a beauty contest, as in the Miss International 2005 pageant held in Tokyo. She is well known for her sculpted beauty and often claims to have not had the facelifts and plastic surgery that her doctor has rumored performing.

In Japanese media, Sukarno has become known for her outspoken personality. In an interview with Desi Anwar of CNN Indonesia, she expressed reservations about being known solely as the late President Sukarno's widow 40 years after his death.

== Controversies ==
In January 1992, Dewi Sukarno became involved in a much-publicised altercation at a party in Aspen, Colorado, United States with fellow international socialite and heiress, Minnie Osmeña. A granddaughter of former Philippine President Sergio Osmeña, she reportedly commented on Sukarno's past, and the spat culminated in Sukarno hitting Osmeña's face with a champagne flute. Osmeña needed 37 stitches, while Sukarno was later detained for 34 days in Aspen for disorderly conduct. Sukarno and Osmeña had already been hostile to each other after an exchange at an earlier party months before, where Sukarno was heard to laugh at Osmeña's political plans (among which was to run for Vice President of the Philippines).

The following year, Sukarno posed for Madame d'Syuga: Dewi with Love, a book of photography by Hideki Fujii that was published in Japan in 1993. Many of the images feature her semi-nude, with some showing what appeared to be tattoo-like body art. The photo-book, while not distributed in Indonesia, was immediately banned by the New Order government, and many Indonesians felt offended by what they perceived to be a disgrace of late President Sukarno's name and legacy.

In 1997, the New York Daily News published anonymous rumors that Sukarno had been involved in a "hair-pulling tiff" at a Halloween party with Kaethe Schuchter, a companion of fraudulent money manager Martin Frankel. Sukarno denied the allegations and after failing to make Schuchter publicly retract the claim, launched a defamation lawsuit against her. Not long after, federal conspiracy and fraud charges were brought up against Frankel and Schuchter, who fled the United States in May 1999. This left Sukarno's lawsuit in limbo and it was not until 2009 that Schuchter was apprehended by Italian authorities.

In the aftermath of the controversial launch of the Kwangmyŏngsŏng-2 satellite in April 2009, Sukarno was invited to comment by Japanese media, since her late husband had managed to maintain favorable relations with North Korea during his reign. In an interview, she commented that "Japan is making too much noise, it's only an artificial satellite", which outraged Japanese right-wing groups. On the evening of April 19, one of their sound trucks appeared at Sukarno's residence in affluent Minato, Tokyo and staged a loud protest. In response, she threw two plant pots from her second-floor balcony and allegedly hit the van's mirrors. Immediately afterward, Sukarno came out to confront the protestors, which resulted in a heated argument. A nearby police officer stationed outside the home of Tarō Asō prevented further escalation and the protesters left without seeking compensation for damages. The following day, Sukarno held a press conference in front of her home to voice her dissatisfaction with the police response.

In July 2012, in response to a bullying incident at Otsu City Ojiyama Junior High School, which resulted in the suicide of a student, Sukarno published names and photos of a woman who was the supposed bully and people who appeared to be related to her in a blog post. It was soon revealed that the perpetrator had been misidentified, however, and Sukarno removed the entry from her blog. When a public apology from Sukarno was not forthcoming, the woman filed a lawsuit against her, demanding 11 million yen (c. US$75,000) in damages. In February 2014, the Kobe District Court deemed Sukarno's actions "extremely thoughtless" and ordered her to pay 1.65 million yen (c. US$11,000). Sukarno claimed that the judgment was unfair and that she would fight it all the way to the Supreme Court, but an undisclosed settlement was later reached at the Osaka High Court.

Tokyo police investigated a complaint against Sukarno in January 2014, following her appearance on the TBS Television show Okusama wa Monster 2 where she had allegedly slapped a fellow guest. Speaking to reporters, Sukarno expressed regret for "having caused an uproar" and said that she and the victim had resolved the incident during a phone call.

In January 2017, Sukarno attracted Chinese criticism when she spoke out in support of APA Group president Toshio Motoya, who had come under fire for distributing political propaganda in the group's hotels, referring to Japanese war crimes such as the Nanjing massacre and wartime sex slavery as "fabricated stories created to dishonor Japan". During a broadcast of TV Asahi's Abema Prime, Sukarno opinioned that Motoya's beliefs and actions fell under his right to freedom of expression and redirected attention towards the issues of Tibetan sovereignty and the Senkaku Islands and South China Sea disputes. Several years later, her involvement in the controversy contributed to a domestic boycott of the Chinese entertainer Zhang Zhehan, who had posed for a photo with Sukarno at a friend's wedding at the Nogi Shrine in 2019, after he had also taken pictures at the controversial Yasukuni Shrine a year earlier.

On October 28, 2020, Sukarno issued an apology for remarks she had made on the Kansai TV variety show Mune-ippai Summit!, where she linked female infertility to abortions. Expressing support for an abortion ban, she had claimed that "the biggest reason for infertility is abortions by pregnant women who don't want to have children", adding that "it's best not to let women in Japan undergo curettage".

In July 2023, Sukarno defended the late Johnny Kitagawa from child sexual abuse allegations on Twitter, tweeting that he "loved the children from his agency as if they were his own" and that the criticism of him was "bringing disgrace to Japan."

== Politics and activism ==
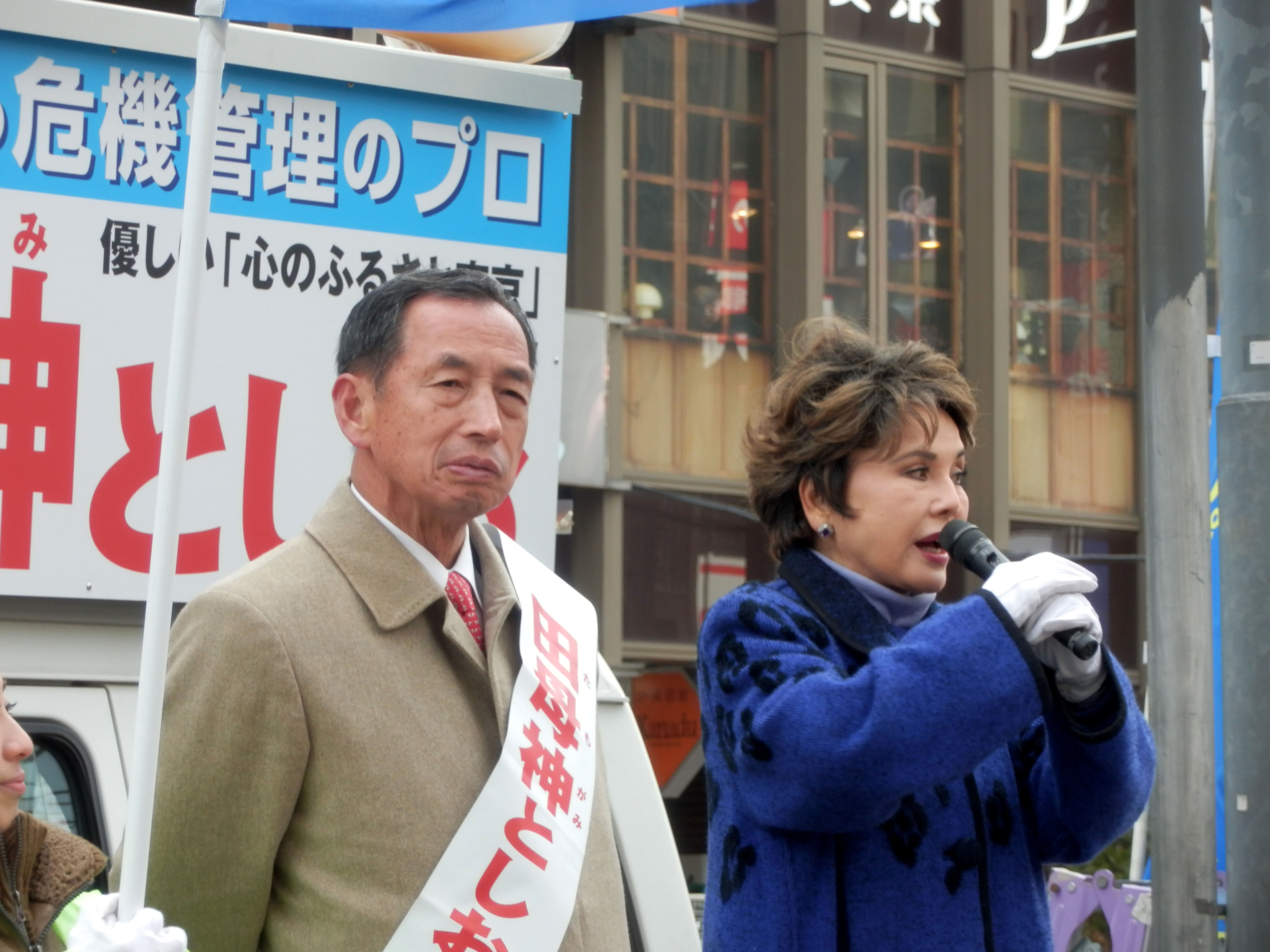
Sukarno speaking in support of the Tokyo gubernatorial candidacy of Toshio Tamogami, February 2014

Dewi Sukarno remains an Indonesian national, being registered on the Permanent Elector's Roll (Daftar Pemilih Tetap) of the Embassy of the Republic of Indonesia in Tokyo as of 2008. However, she did not exercise her right to vote. In 2016, Sukarno still expressed the intention to keep her Indonesian nationality – stating that an Indonesian passport was the only way she could freely travel to and from e.g. Blitar (where her late husband's resting place is), i.e. as an Indonesian citizen.

Since the ousting of her husband, Sukarno has had little involvement with Indonesian politics. When asked in 2004 to comment about the reign of her stepdaughter, Megawati, she replied; "I think Megawati is gradually doing whatever she can. It's not easy being a Muslim woman president."

As of 2004, Sukarno had worked with the Japanese Red Cross Society and the United Nations Environment Programme (UNEP), and expressed the wish to help refugees as well as people living under regimes like North Korea.

After the January 2008 death of her husband's successor, Suharto, Sukarno made appearances in the news media, blaming him for instituting a repressive regime and likening him to Cambodian despot Pol Pot.

In 2011, Sukarno ran an online petition to disinherit then-crown prince Naruhito and make his younger brother Fumihito heir to the throne.

On February 12, 2025, Sukarno announced the establishment of the 12 Peace Party (Japanese: 12平和党, romanized: 12 Heiwatō), which she co-represented with animal rights activist Horiike Hiroshi of the World Dog Alliance. In order to participate in Japanese politics, she made an attempt to renounce her Indonesian citizenship and reclaim her Japanese nationality. By April 20, Sukarno had not been able to reacquire Japanese citizenship and the 12 Peace Party disbanded.

== Filmography ==
- PriPara Mi~nna no Akogare Let's Go PriPari (2016) as Ploria Ōkanda (voice)
- Idol Time PriPara (2017) as Ploria Ōkanda (voice, episode 39)
- The Confidence Man JP: Episode of the Princess (2020)
