= Consulate-General of Japan, Surabaya =

Consular representation of Japan in Indonesia

Coordinates: 7.272533°S 112.746539°E

Consulate-General of Japan, Surabaya 在スラバヤ日本国総領事館
- Konsulat Jenderal Jepang, Surabaya
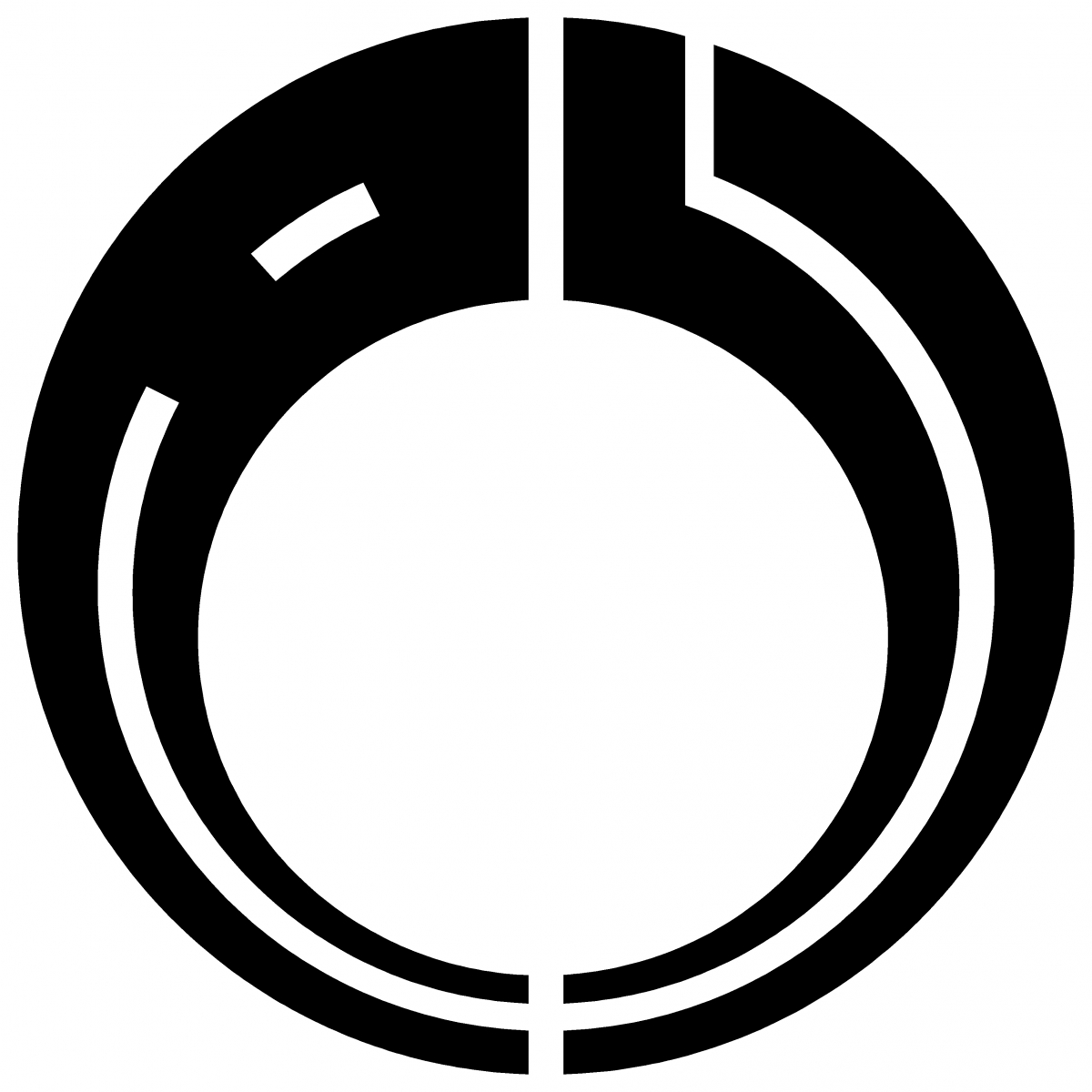
- Seal of the Japanese Ministry of Foreign Affairs

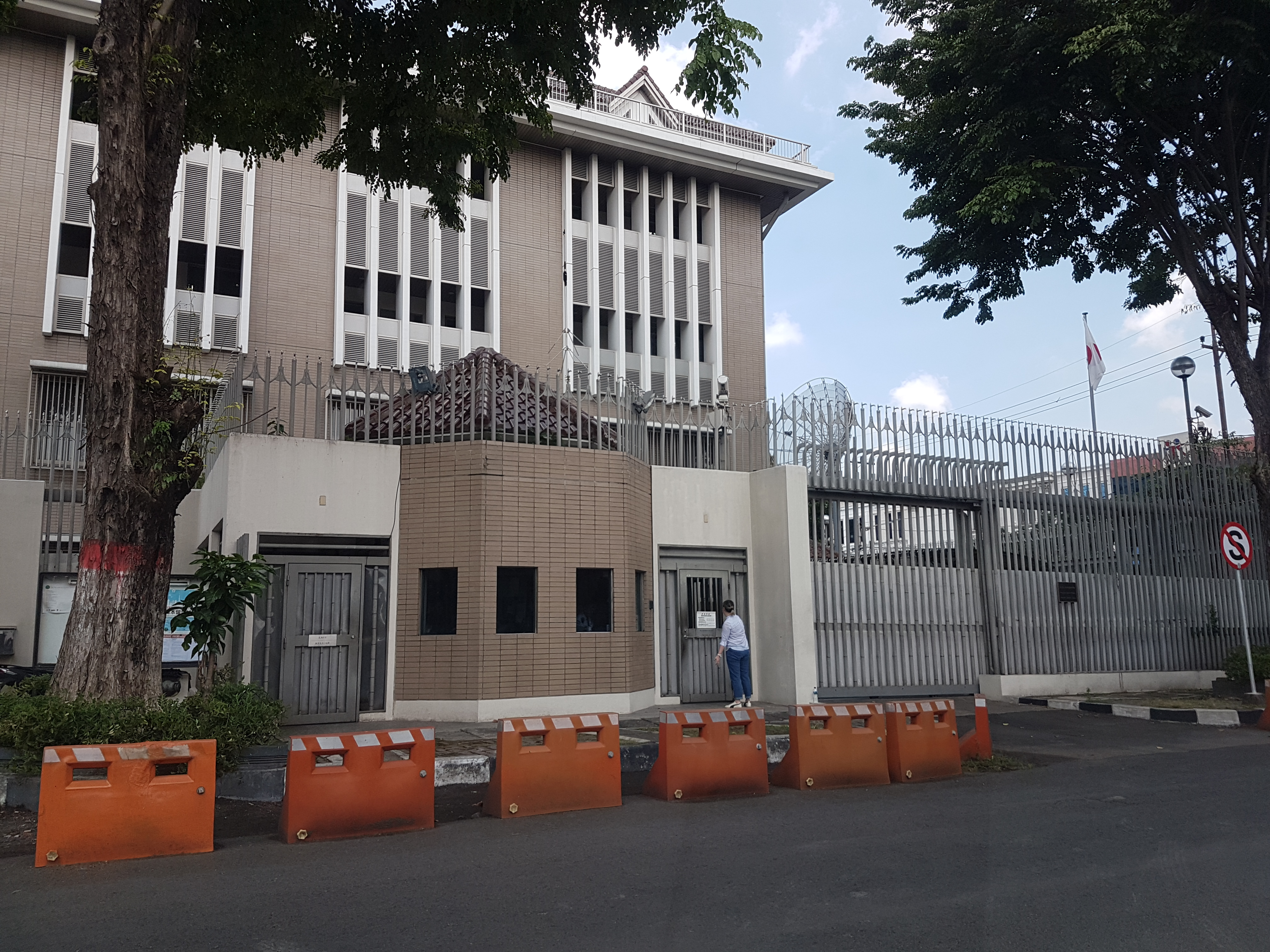
- Incumbent; Takeyama Kenichi
- Ministry of Foreign Affairs (Japan)
- Style: Consul General
- Seat: Jl. Sumatera No.93, Gubeng, Surabaya, Indonesia
- Formation: 13 March 1920 (to Dutch East Indies); 5 August 1952 (to Indonesia)
- Website: Official website of Consulate-General of Japan in Surabaya

The Consulate-General of Japan, Surabaya (Japanese: 在スラバヤ日本国総領事館, romanized: Zai Surabaya Nipponkoku sōryōjikan; Indonesian: Konsulat Jenderal Jepang, Surabaya) is a Japanese diplomatic mission to Indonesia in Surabaya, East Java. The first Japanese diplomatic mission in Surabaya was established on 13 March 1920 while the city was under rule of the Dutch East Indies. In 1979, the consulate upgraded its status to Consulate-General. The General-Consulate in Surabaya leads the Japanese diplomatic mission in the 4 provinces (East Java, South Kalimantan, East Kalimantan, and North Kalimantan) and 8 provinces with the consulate office (branch) in Makassar (South Sulawesi, Southeast Sulawesi, West Sulawesi, Central Sulawesi, Gorontalo, North Sulawesi, North Maluku, Maluku, West Papua, and Papua province). The consulate-general is located at Jalan Sumatera No.93, Gubeng, Surabaya. Takeyama Kenichi is the current consul general in Surabaya.

== Timeline of History ==
- 13 March 1920 – a Japanese Empire Consulate in Surabaya under the rule of Dutch East Indies.
- 8 December 1941 – Imperial Japanese Army began landing on Malay Peninsula, and simultaneously closed the Japanese Imperial Consulate in Surabaya in Dutch East India, the Japanese Imperial Consulate in Batavia, and the Japanese Imperial Consulate in Medan. The Dutch Empire officially declared war to Japanese Empire
- 9 March 1942 – the Dutch East Indies government surrendered to Japanese Empire, and Japanese rule began in the region corresponding to the present Indonesia.
- 14 August 1945 – the Japanese Empire, who suffered a series of consecutive defeats against the United States and the Soviet Union, accepted the Potsdam Declaration, which had been abolished once, and announced its willingness to surrender to the Allied Forces.
- 15 August 1945 – at around noon of Japanese time (UTC+09:00), the end of the year's end book was broadcast on the radio, and it is well known that Japan's former Dutch East Indies rule would be abandoned.
- 17 August 1945 – the Indonesian independence proclamator Sukarno and Mohammad Hatta announced their declaration of independence, but the former colonial powers of the Dutch did not approve their independence and decided to use force.
- 27 December 1949 – After more than four years of Indonesian independence war, the Dutch colonial accepts the abandonment of Dutch East Indies and approved Indonesia's independence.
- 28 April 1952 – With the entry into force of the San Francisco Peace Treaty, Japan becomes independent.
- 5 August 1952 – The Japanese Consulate in Surabaya reopened on 5 August 1952, and the Japanese Consulate General in Jakarta changed to Embassy in same day.
- 15 April 1958 – The peace treaty between Japan and the Republic of Indonesia and the compensation agreement between Japan and the Republic of Indonesia and Japan-Indonesia diplomatic relations are established.
- 1979 – the consulate in Surabaya was promoted to the Consulate General.
- 1980 – the Denpasar Business Office under jurisdiction of the Japanese Consulate General of Surabaya was established in Denpasar, the province capital of Bali .
- 1 January 2006 – the Deputy Representative Office in Denpasar and its jurisdiction was removed from the jurisdiction of the Japanese Consulate General in Surabaya, and upgraded its status to Consulate-General in Denpasar.
- 1 January 2009 – Japanese consulate-general in Makassar downgraded its status to just Japanese Representative Office.
- 1 January 2014 – Japanese Representative Office in Makassar changed to Consular office.

== See also ==
- Indonesia–Japan relations
- List of diplomatic missions of Japan
