= Indonesia–Japan relations =

- Indonesia: Japan

Diplomatic mission
- Indonesian Embassy, Tokyo: Japanese Embassy, Jakarta

Indonesia and Japan established diplomatic relations in 1958. Both are two Asian nations that share historical, economic, and political ties. Both nations went through a difficult period in World War II when the then Dutch East Indies was occupied by the Imperial Japanese Army for three-and-a-half years. Japan is a major trading partner for Indonesia. Japan is Indonesia's largest export partner and also a major donor of development aid to Indonesia through Japan International Cooperation Agency. Indonesia is a vital supplier of natural resources such as liquefied natural gas to Japan. Today in Indonesia, there are about 11,000 Japanese expatriates whereas in Japan, there are approximately 24,000 Indonesian nationals working and training.

Indonesia has an embassy in Tokyo and a consulate in Osaka. Japan has an embassy in Jakarta, consulate-general in Surabaya, and consulates in Medan, Denpasar and Makassar.

== History ==
The linguist Ann Kumar (2009) proposed that some Austronesians migrated to Japan, possibly an elite-group from Java, and created the Japanese-hierarchical society and identifies 82 plausible cognates between Austronesian and Japanese. However, Kumar's theory is controversial because it lacks archaeological, genetic, and linguistic evidence.

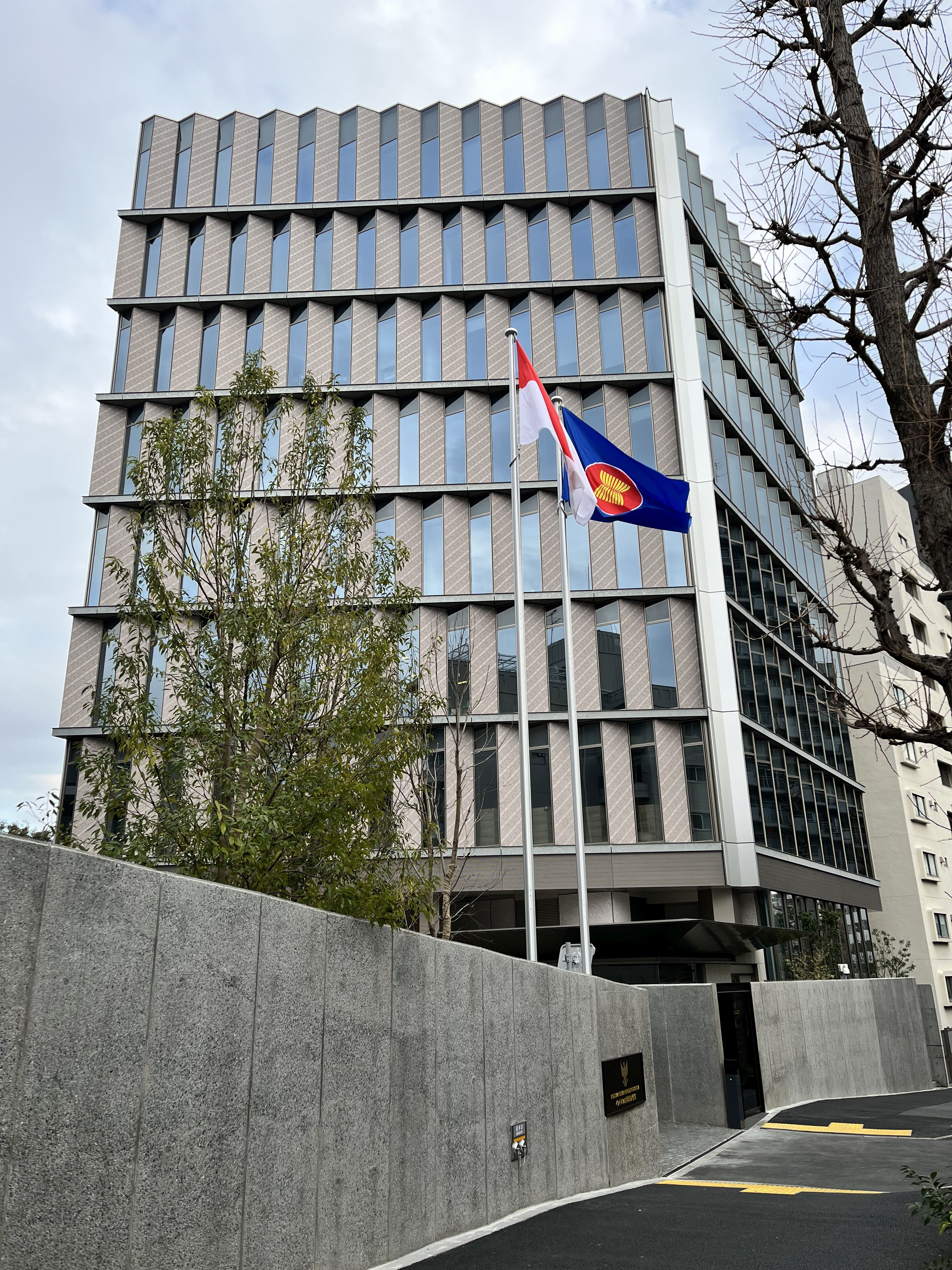
Embassy of Indonesia in Japan

=== Colonial–era relations ===
In early 17th century Japanese settlers were first recorded to settle in Dutch East Indies. A larger wave came in the 17th century, when Red seal ships traded in Southeast Asia. In 1898 the Dutch East Indies colonial records show 614 Japanese residing in the Dutch East Indies (166 men, 448 women). As the Japanese population grew, a Japanese consulate was established in Batavia in 1909, but for the first several years its population statistics were rather haphazard. Beginning in the late 1920s, Okinawan fishermen began to settle in north Sulawesi. There was a Japanese primary school at Manado, which by 1939 had 18 students. In total, 6,349 Japanese people lived in Indonesia by 1938.

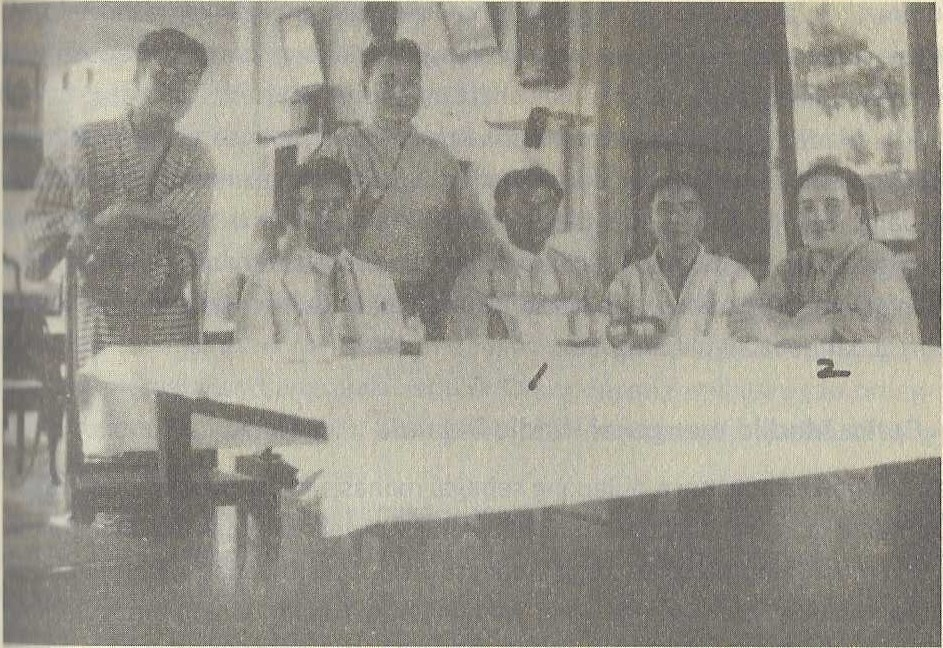
Madjid Usman (1) with members of the consulate at the Japanese Consulate in Batavia in 1932, prior to his studies in Tokyo.

The first Indonesian student to have studied in Japan was revolutionary and Minang politician, Abdoel Madjid Usman at Meiji University studying Law. During his time there, he co-founded the Serikat Indonesia (Indonesian Union), an organization for Indonesian students in Japan, and actively promoted Indonesia's independence in various international forums. He would become a collaborator, an independence advocate, and politician.

In 1942, the Empire of Japan invaded countries in Southeast Asia, including Indonesia. The Japanese seized the key oil production zones of Borneo, Java, Sumatera, and the Netherlands New Guinea (the modern day Indonesian province of Papua, which was also conveniently abundant in highly valuable copper) of the late Dutch East Indies, defeating the Dutch forces and were welcomed by many as liberating heroes by Javanese natives. Many natives saw as the realization of an indigenous Javanese prophecy. The Japanese encouraged the spread of Indonesian nationalist sentiment. Although this was done more for Japanese political advantage than from altruistic support of Indonesian independence, this support created new Indonesian institutions and elevated political leaders such as Sukarno. Through recruiting Indonesian nationalist leaders, the Japanese attempted to rally Indonesian support and mobilize the Indonesian people in support of the Japanese war efforts. The experience of the Japanese occupation of Indonesia varied considerably, depending upon where one's location and social position. Many who lived in areas considered essential to the war effort endured torture, sexual slavery, arbitrary arrest and execution, and other war crimes. Many thousands of people were taken away from Indonesia as forced laborers, or romusha, for Japanese military projects where there was a very high death rate.

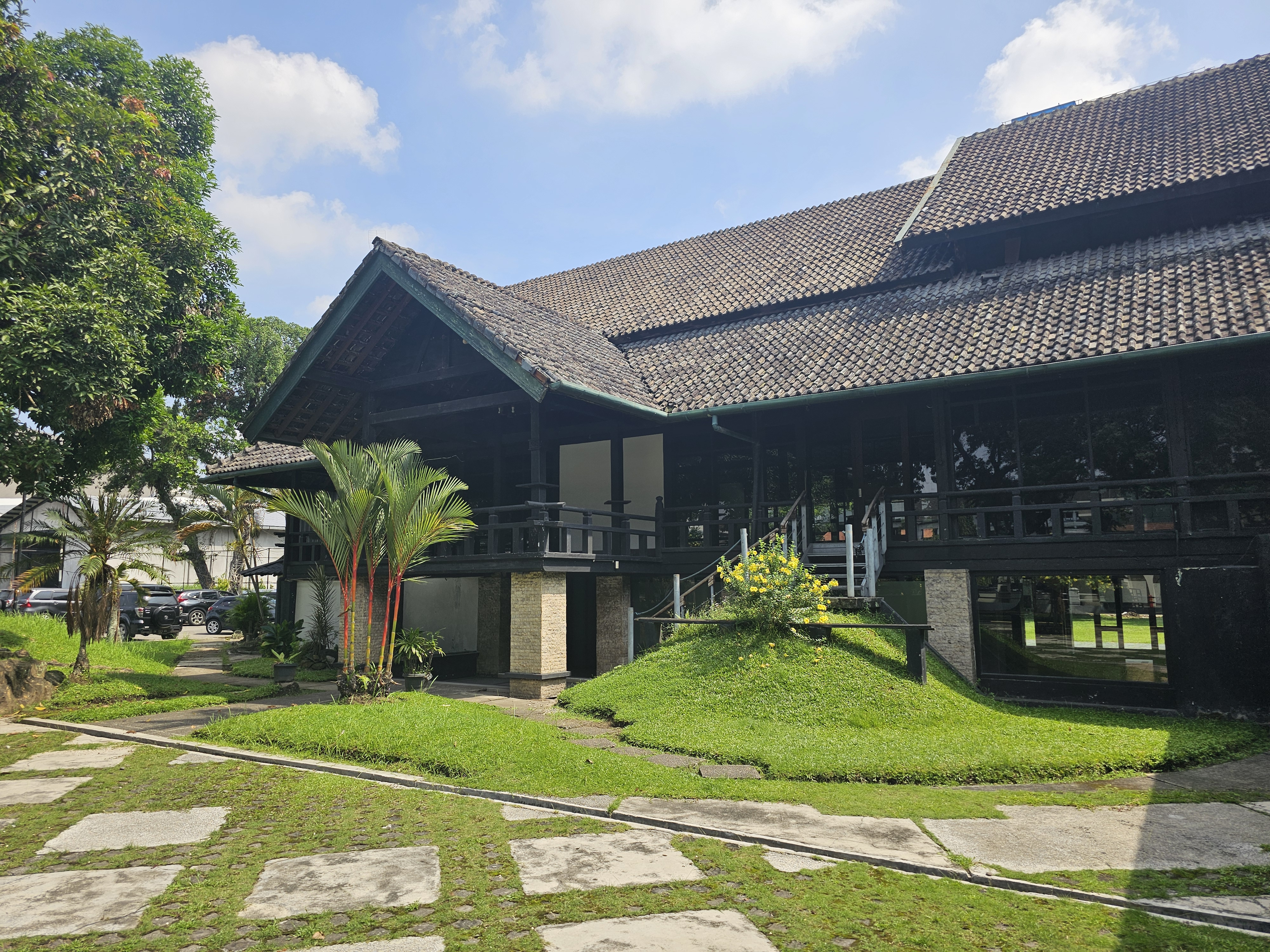
Hirohara Jinja remains as the last Japanese Shinto shrine in Southeast Asia after World War II

To gain military support from Indonesian people in their war against Western Allied force, Japan began to foster the Indonesian nationalistic movement by providing Indonesian youths with military training and weapons, including the formation of a volunteer army called Pembela Tanah Air (PETA; Defenders of the Homeland). The Japanese military training of Indonesian youths originally was intended to rally the local's support to bolster the collapsing power of the Japanese Empire. However, later this military training became a significant asset for the Indonesian Republic during the National Revolution from 1945 to 1949.

In 1945, with the Japanese on the brink of defeat, the Dutch sought to re-establish their authority in Indonesia, and requested the Japanese army "preserve law and order" in Indonesia. Unfortunately for the Dutch, the Japanese favored helping Indonesian nationalists prepare for self-government. On 7 September 1944, as the war was going badly for the Japanese, Prime Minister Kuniaki Koiso promised independence for Indonesia, although the Prime Minister failed to set a date for this independence. On 29 April 1945, Japanese 16th Army force formed the BPUPK (Japanese: Dokuritsu Junbi Chou-sakai), a Japanese-organized committee to work on "preparations for independence in the region of the government of this island of Java". The organization was founded on 29 April 1945, by Lt. Gen. Kumakichi Harada, the commander of 16th Army in Java. It discussed matters related to Indonesian independence, although the later Indonesian Proclamation of Independence on 17 August 1945 was carried out independently by Sukarno and Hatta without the official support of Japan.

=== Post-Independence era relations ===
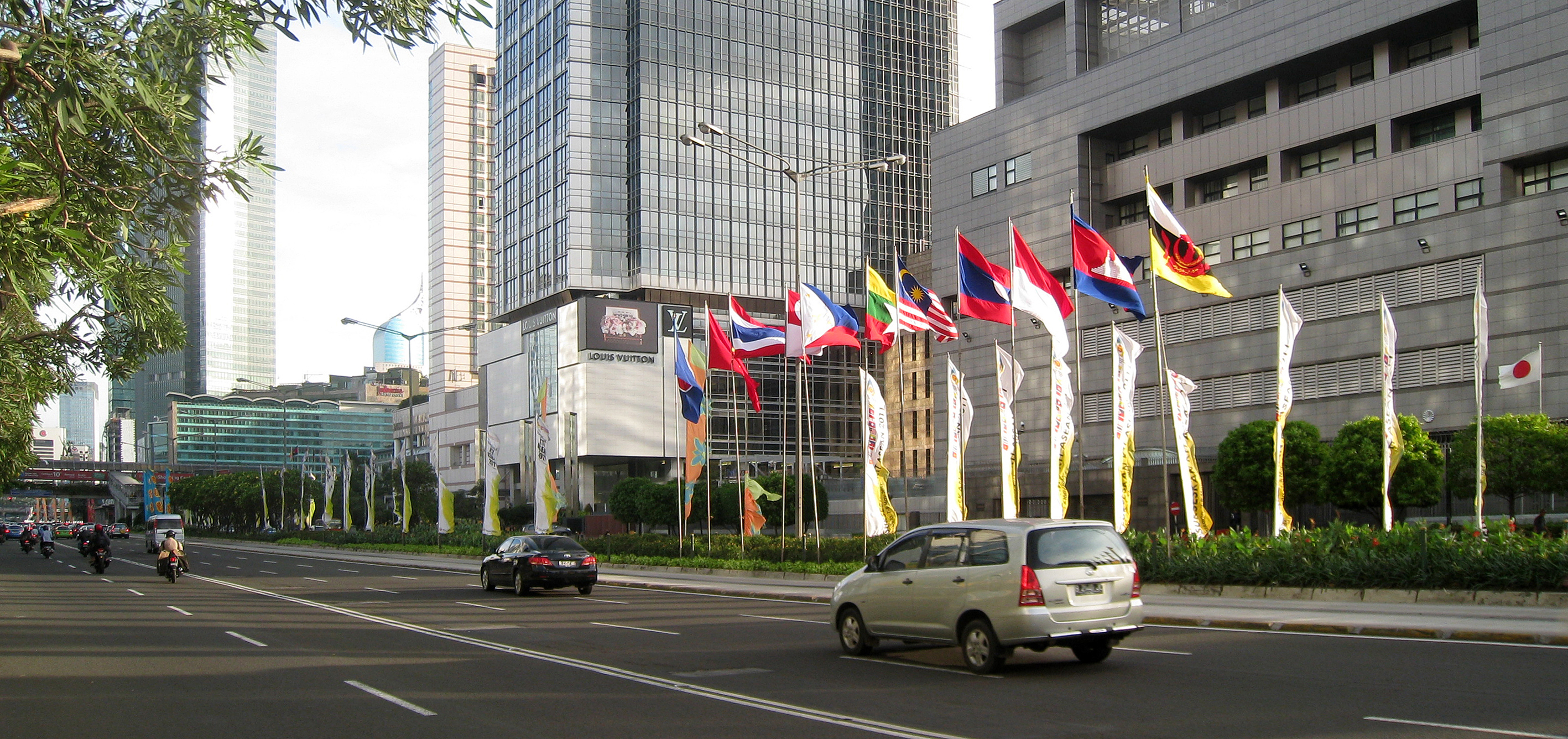
The Embassy of Japan (right) at Jl. Thamrin, Central Jakarta.

After the end of Japanese occupation, roughly 3,000 Imperial Japanese Army soldiers chose to remain in Indonesia and fight alongside local people against the Dutch colonists in the Indonesian National Revolution; roughly one-third were killed, of whom many are buried in the Kalibata Heroes' Cemetery, while another third chose to remain in Indonesia after the fighting ended, some of them becoming decorated as Indonesian independence heroes.

After the Indonesian Revolution, Indonesian independence was recognized by the end of 1949. In the mid-1950s, talks between Japan and Indonesia began on war reparations after the San Francisco Agreement was signed, and finalized with the Agreement on Compensation and the opening of diplomatic relations in 1958. Indonesia and Japan signed a peace treaty on 20 January 1958 in Jakarta. Bilateral diplomatic relations between the two countries were officially established on 15 April 1958.

In the 1970s, Japanese manufacturers, especially those in the electronics sector, began establishing factories in Indonesia; this encouraged the migration of a new wave of Japanese expatriates, mainly managers and technical staff connected to large Japanese corporations. The Japanese automotive industry also began to dominate Indonesian market and today Japanese car manufacturers enjoys the largest market shares in Indonesia. Simultaneously Japanese consumer products began to pour into Indonesian market.

However the Japanese economic domination over Indonesia has led to the popular opposition that escalated into the Malari incident, (abbreviation of Indonesian: Malapetaka Limabelas Januari or "Fifteen January disaster") when anti-Japanese and anti-foreign investment demonstrations led to riots on 15 January 1974, during Japanese Prime Minister Kakuei Tanaka's state visit to Jakarta on 14—17 January 1974. Japanese investment in Indonesia has steadily increased since the 1980s continued well to 21st century.

== Economic relations ==
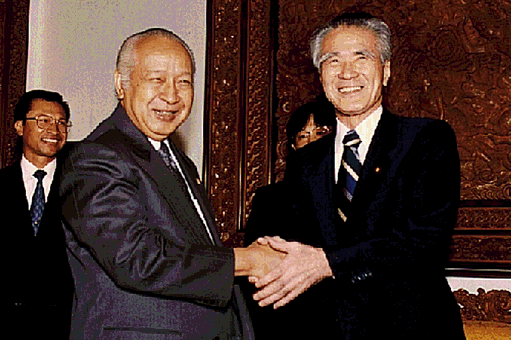
Indonesian President Suharto with Japanese Prime Minister Tomiichi Murayama during Murayama visit to Indonesia in 1994

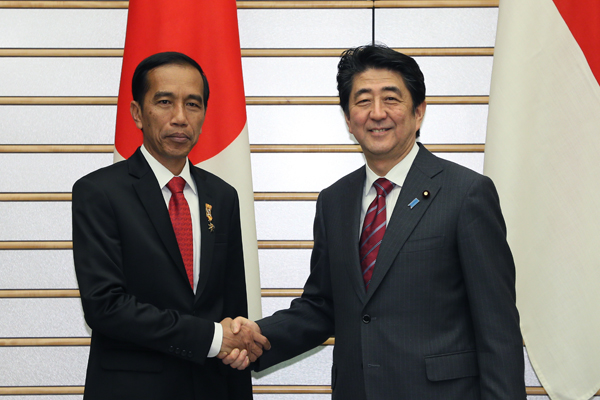
Indonesian President Joko Widodo with Japanese Prime Minister Shinzō Abe during Widodo visit to Japan in 2015

In 2012, there were between 1,200 and 1,300 Japanese corporates operating in Indonesia, with some 12,000 Japanese nationals living in Indonesia. Japan has been investing in Indonesia for decades, particularly in the automotive, electronic goods, energy, and mining sectors. Prior to the formation of the Indonesian Republic, the Japanese had viewed Indonesia as an important source of natural resources. The Japanese need of natural resources was among the reasons that led the nation to advance further to the south in their military conquests during World War II. Today Indonesia is Japan's major supplier for natural rubber, liquefied natural gas, coal, minerals, paper pulp, seafood such as shrimp and tuna, and coffee. Traditionally Indonesia has been regarded as a major market of Japanese automotive and electronic goods. For Japanese businesses, Indonesia has been a location for low-cost manufacturing operations as well as being the source of various natural resources required by those operations. Approximately 1,000 Japanese companies operate in Indonesia which employ approximately 300,000 people. Major Japanese factories are concentrated east of Jakarta with high concentrations in Bekasi, Cikarang and Karawang, West Java.

Japanese restaurant chains such as Beard Papa's, Yoshinoya, Sukiya and Ebisu Curry, fashion, retail and household appliances stores such as Sogo, AEON and MUJI, and bookstores such as Books Kinokuniya have recently entered the market in Indonesia. In 2009, Taisho Pharmaceutical Co. acquired Bristol Myers Squibb Indonesia. The investment of these new corporations is encouraged by the success of several Japanese companies. Ajinomoto is planning the construction of a new US$50 million factory in Indonesia.

The trend of bilateral trade volume in 2007-11 period revealed an average increase of 11.97 percent per year, as the bilateral trade figures shows significant increase from US$30.15 billion in 2007 to US$53.15 billion in 2011. Trade between two countries amounted to about $37.44 billion in 2018, ranked Japan as Indonesia's 2nd largest trading partner behind China ($72.67 Billion).

On 20 October 2020 during the COVID-19 pandemic, then-Japanese Prime Minister Yoshihide Suga visited Indonesia, and pledged low-interest loans of ¥50 billion ($473 million) to Indonesia in talks with the Southeast Asian nation's President Joko Widodo to help it cope with the economic fallout from the coronavirus pandemic.

== Cultural exchange and tourism ==
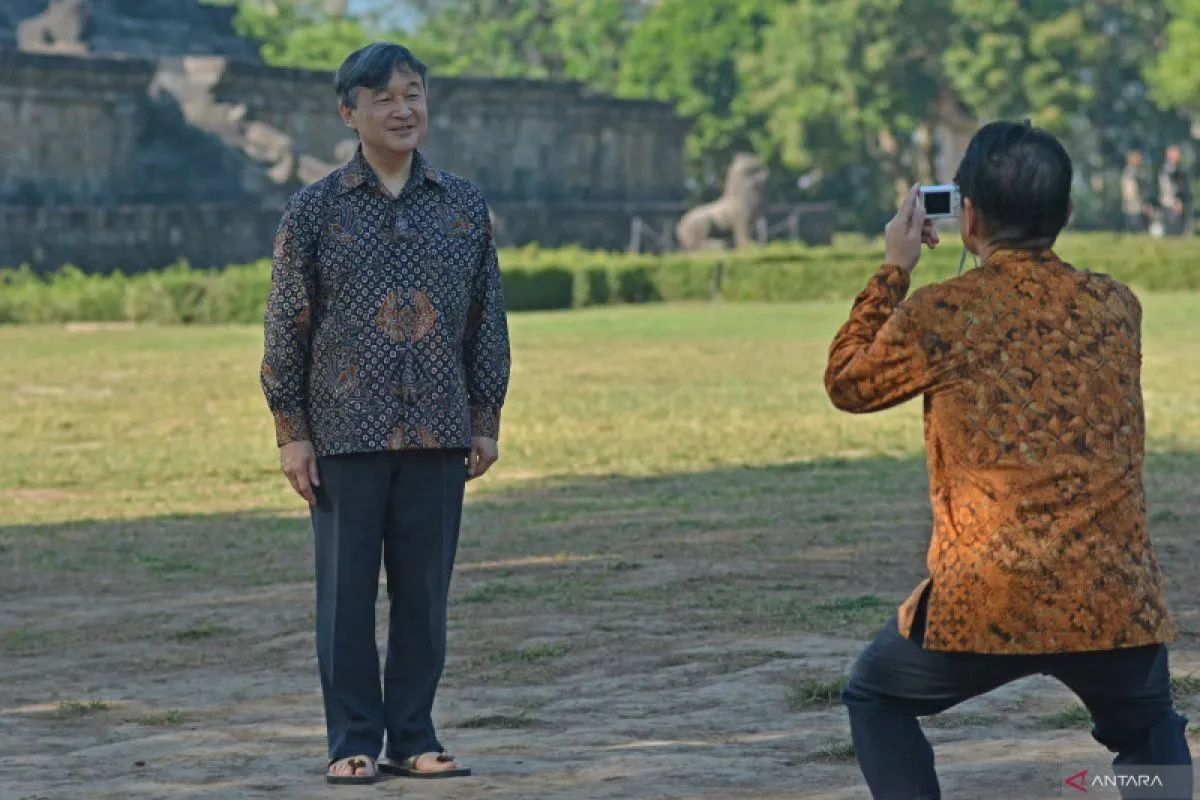
Emperor Naruhito (left) poses for a photo while visiting the Borobudur Temple Tourism Park in Magelang, Central Java, June 2023.

Japanese culture is well known in Indonesia, ranging from the traditional hallmarks such as Japanese cuisine, origami, samurai and karate, to modern culture including J-pop, manga, anime, video games and cosplay. The city pop music genre has influenced a local music scene known as pop kreatif. Popular Japanese animation programmes such as Doraemon, Power Rangers and Crayon Shinchan, as well as video games such as Super Mario, Street Fighter and Final Fantasy have gained popularity among Indonesians since the late-1990s. JKT48, based in Jakarta, was the first overseas sister group of AKB48 idol girl group. Japanese VTuber agencies like hololive and Nijisanji, also created overseas branches composed of Indonesian-speaking VTubers. Conversely, many Japanese have become interested in Indonesian culture. Indonesian cultural icons such as batik, gamelan, and Indonesian dances have gained Japanese attention. Bali and Borobudur have become popular destinations for Japanese tourists: Japan is one of the largest sources of tourism in Bali.

There are over 85,000 Indonesians studying the Japanese language, the largest number in Southeast Asia and the sixth largest in the world. The Indonesian interest in the Japanese language has been kindled by the increasing amount of Japanese business in Indonesia since 1980s and the sizable number of Japanese tourists visiting Indonesia. Proficiency in Japanese has become quite an asset for Indonesian students and workers.

In Jakarta, Grand Wijaya Center and Blok M have clusters of businesses catering to Japanese expatriates, including restaurants and supermarkets selling imported food products; Blok M, in particular. As a result of the high number of Japanese–style businesses and entertainments, the area around Blok M and Melawai Raya Street have come to be known as Jakarta's "Little Tokyo".

In 2014, the Japanese government abolished visa requirements for Indonesian citizens who possess an ordinary biometric passport in an effort to increase people-to-people exchanges between Japan and Indonesia.

Former Japanese ambassador for Indonesia, Masafumi Ishii, is known for his fondness for several Indonesian cuisines. He frequently posted his eating activities on Instagram, which made him famous in both countries, particularly Indonesia.

== Japanese development aid ==
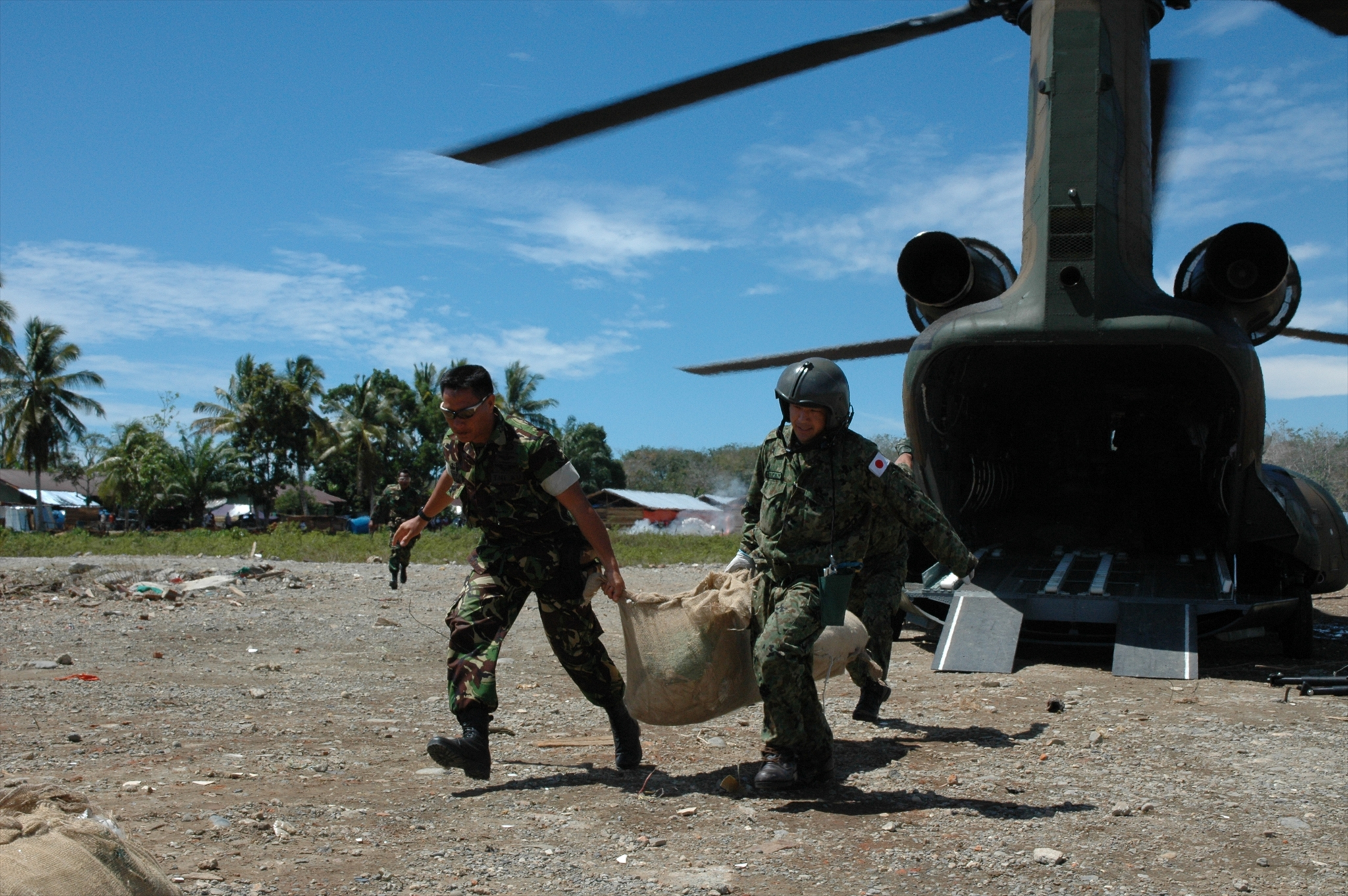
JGSDF soldiers distributing aid during its disaster relief activities in the aftermath of the 2004 Aceh Tsunami

Japan is one of the largest donors of development aid to Indonesia; this development aid is facilitated through the Japan International Cooperation Agency (JICA) and through international agencies, especially the Asian Development Bank. Among ASEAN countries, Indonesia is the largest Japan's Official Development Assistance recipient. For forty years, between 1967 and 2007, Japanese aid to Indonesia was provided within the arrangements of, first, the Inter-Governmental Group on Indonesia, and later the Consultative Group on Indonesia.

== Military relations ==
Despite historical Japanese military aggression against Indonesia, mutual fear of an increasing Chinese threat has spurred the two nations to move relations into the defense sector. In 2021, Japan agreed to transfer weapons to Indonesia. In July 2022, Japan joined the United States and Australia in an Indonesian military exercise focusing on freedom of navigation.

== Multilateral organizations ==
Both countries are members of the United Nations, Asia-Pacific Economic Cooperation, G20 major economies, Asia Cooperation Dialogue, World Trade Organization, and among others.

== View of Japan influence ==
Results of 2013 Pew Research Center poll Asia/Pacific views of Japan by country (sorted by fav − unfav)
Country polled	Positive	Negative	Neutral	Pos − Neg
Indonesia	79%	12%	9	67

Results of 2011 BBC World Service poll Views of Japan's influence by country (sorted by pos − neg)
Country polled	Positive	Negative	Neutral	Pos − Neg
Indonesia	85%	7%	8	78

According to a 2011 BBC World Service Poll, 85% of Indonesians view Japan's influence positively, with 7% expressing a negative view, making Indonesia one of the most pro-Japanese countries in the world.

== See also ==
- Japanese invasion of the Dutch East Indies
- Japanese migration to Indonesia
- Indonesians in Japan
- Consulate-General of Japan, Surabaya

== Notes ==
=== Works cited ===
- Fukihara Yutaka/吹原豊 (2007), エスニックコミュニティの成立と発展一大洗町における定住インドネシア人共同体の事例一 [Birth and Development of an Ethnic Community: In the Case of Indonesian Migrant Community in Oarai] (PDF), 地域文化研究 (in Japanese), vol. 5, pp. 21–36, archived from the original (PDF) on 2012-03-19
- 畠山清行 [Hatakeyama Seikō]; 保阪正康 [Hosaka Masayasu] (2004), 陸軍中野学校終戦秘史 [The secret post-war history of the Nakano Infantry School], 新潮社 [Shinchōsha], ISBN 978-4-10-115522-7
- 目黒潮 [Meguro Ushio] (2005), 茨城県大洗町における日系インドネシア人の集住化と就労構造 [Establishment of the Nikkei Indonesian Community and their employment system in Oarai Town, Ibaraki] (PDF), Intercultural Communication Studies (in Japanese) (17): 49–78, archived from the original (PDF) on 2007-10-28
- Murayama, Yoshitada (1993), "The Pattern of Economic Penetration of the Dutch East Indies", in Shiraishi, Saya; Shiraishi, Takashi (eds.), The Japanese in colonial Southeast Asia, Southeast Asian Publications, vol. 3, Cornell University, pp. 87–110, ISBN 978-0-87727-402-5
- Shiraishi, Saya; Shiraishi, Takashi, eds. (1993), "The Japanese in Colonial Southeast Asia: An Overview", The Japanese in colonial Southeast Asia, Southeast Asian Publications, vol. 3, Cornell University, pp. 1–20, ISBN 978-0-87727-402-5.
