= Wreck-It Ralph =

2012 animated film by Rich Moore

- Theatrical release poster
- Directed by: Rich Moore
- Screenplay by: Phil Johnston; Jennifer Lee
- Story by: Rich Moore; Phil Johnston; Jim Reardon
- Produced by: Clark Spencer
- Starring: John C. Reilly; Sarah Silverman; Jack McBrayer; Jane Lynch
- Cinematography: Rob Dressel
- Edited by: Tim Mertens
- Music by: Henry Jackman
- Production company: Walt Disney Animation Studios
- Distributed by: Walt Disney Studios Motion Pictures (Note: Distributed under the Walt Disney Pictures banner.)
- Release dates: October 29, 2012 (El Capitan Theatre); November 2, 2012 (United States)
- Running time: 101 minutes
- Country: United States
- Language: English
- Budget: $165 million
- Box office: $496.5 million

Wreck-It Ralph is a 2012 American animated comedy film produced by Walt Disney Animation Studios. Directed by Rich Moore and written by Phil Johnston and Jennifer Lee, it stars the voices of John C. Reilly, Sarah Silverman, Jack McBrayer, and Jane Lynch. The film follows Ralph (Reilly), an arcade game villain who rebels against his in-game role and dreams of becoming a hero.

The concept of Wreck-It Ralph originated in the late 1980s under the working title High Score and evolved through various iterations. Moore sought to capture an authentic video-game world by including real video game characters like Bowser, Clyde and Doctor Eggman, while focusing on creating new characters. For animation, Disney introduced new reflectance functions and a real-time virtual camera system. The team researched candy factories and food photography to inspire the design of the Sugar Rush game world. Henry Jackman composed the score and the soundtrack featured original songs by Owl City, AKB48 and Skrillex, among others.

Wreck-It Ralph premiered at the El Capitan Theatre in Los Angeles on October 29, 2012, and went into general release on November 2. The film was a critical and commercial success, grossing $496 million worldwide against a $165 million budget and winning the Annie Award for Best Animated Feature, as well as receiving nominations for the Golden Globe and Academy Award for Best Animated Feature. A sequel, Ralph Breaks the Internet, was released in 2018.

== Plot ==
Whenever Litwak's Arcade closes for the day, its games' characters leave their in-game roles and socialize via a power strip called Game Central Station, resembling New York's Grand Central Station. Wreck-It Ralph, a character in platformer Fix-It Felix, Jr., is frustrated with his assigned role as the villain. After being ostracized at his game's 30th-anniversary commemoration, Ralph decides to win a medal, believing that it will earn him respect. Upon learning that the first-person shooter Hero's Duty awards medals, Ralph sneaks into the game and obtains a medal after getting past its enemies, Cy-Bugs, which merge with anything they eat.

Ralph accidentally launches himself in an escape pod with a Cy-Bug inside and crash-lands in Sugar Rush, a confectionery-themed kart racing game. With Ralph gone, his game is labeled "out of order", putting it at risk of being unplugged. Fix-It Felix Jr. himself, having learned of what happened from Q*bert, leaves the game to find Ralph, allying with Hero's Duty's protagonist Sergeant Calhoun, who tracks the Cy-Bug, as they behave like a computer virus once outside their game.

In Sugar Rush, racer Vanellope von Schweetz steals Ralph's medal and uses it to buy her way into the nightly race that determines which characters will be playable the next day. King Candy, the ruler of Sugar Rush's world, forbids her from racing since she has been labeled as a glitch. Vanellope promises to get the medal back if Ralph helps her win; he helps her build a new kart and teaches her to drive inside Diet Cola Mountain. Meanwhile, Calhoun and Felix arrive in Sugar Rush, where Felix explains the history of Turbo, protagonist of racing game TurboTime, who grew envious of a newly-commissioned RoadBlasters' success and invaded it, resulting in both games being unplugged. He worries Ralph will meet the same fate; referred in the arcade as "going Turbo", Felix and Calhoun then fall into "Nesquik-sand", work together to escape, and begin to fall in love.

Meanwhile, King Candy hacks into Sugar Rush's code and retrieves the medal, giving it back to Ralph. He claims that Vanellope becoming playable would be disastrous for both her and their game; Ralph decides he cannot allow Vanellope to race and destroys her kart. Meanwhile, Calhoun abandons Felix when he unintentionally reminds her of her late fiancé, who was eaten by a Cy-Bug on their wedding day. Felix is imprisoned by Candy's assistant, Sour Bill, while Calhoun discovers that the Cy-Bug has multiplied exponentially.

Upon returning to Fix-It Felix, Jr., which has been evacuated, Ralph notices a picture of Vanellope on Sugar Rush's cabinet. Realizing King Candy had lied, he returns to Sugar Rush and interrogates Sour Bill, who reveals that King Candy damaged Vanellope's code. King Candy's edits to the code also have ensured no one but himself knows Vanellope's true role. However, if Vanellope completes a race, the game will reset itself, deleting all of King Candy's changes. Ralph frees Vanellope and Felix from the dungeon. Felix fixes the kart, and Vanellope belatedly enters the race, but the Cy-Bugs emerge and start destroying the game. Calhoun, Felix, and Ralph help evacuate the characters.

Unaware of the Cy-Bugs, King Candy attempts to ram Vanellope off the track, but her glitching exposes him as Turbo, who secretly took over Sugar Rush after surviving the unplugging of RoadBlasters and TurboTime. Vanellope flees as Turbo is devoured by a Cy-Bug, which fuses with him into an insectoid monster. Remembering from Hero's Duty that a beacon will draw and destroy the Cy-Bugs, Ralph opposes Turbo as he collapses the Mentos roof of Diet Cola Mountain, creating an eruption that lures and destroys Turbo and the Cy-Bugs. Vanellope rescues Ralph and crosses the finish line. The game resets, restoring her as the true ruler of Sugar Rush, though she retains her glitching ability, considering it an advantage.

Ralph returns to his game, content with his role as a bad guy and finally respected by his fellow characters. Felix and Calhoun get married, the Q-Bert characters get invited into Fix-It Felix Jr. as playable characters in the bonus levels, and Vanellope gains popularity through her rightful playability.

== Cast ==
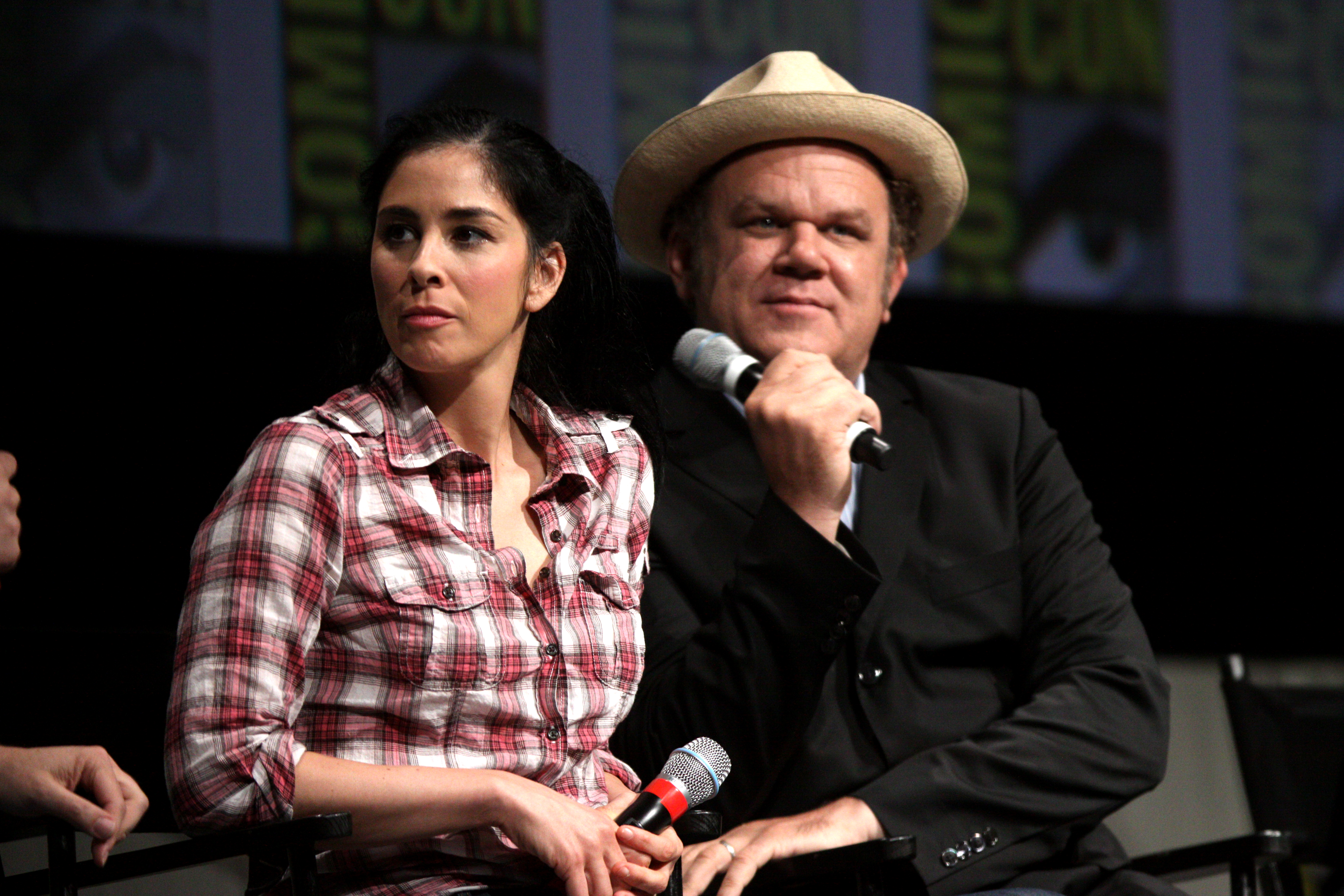
Sarah Silverman and John C. Reilly promoting Wreck-It Ralph at the 2012 San Diego Comic-Con

- John C. Reilly as Wreck-It Ralph, a gigantic but soft-hearted man who is the villain of the fictional arcade game Fix-It Felix Jr.
- Sarah Silverman as Vanellope von Schweetz, a racer/glitch in Sugar Rush.
- Jack McBrayer as Fix-It Felix Jr., a repairman who is the hero of Fix-It Felix Jr.
- Jane Lynch as Sergeant Tamora Jean Calhoun, the lead character of Hero's Duty.
- Alan Tudyk as King Candy, the competitive and stubborn ruler of Sugar Rush. He is later revealed to be Turbo, the disgraced protagonist of TurboTime who infamously invaded and crashed a newly-commissioned RoadBlasters out of jealousy. The character's vocal stylings are based on comedian Ed Wynn and his physical mannerisms are modeled from Wynn's Mad Hatter character in Alice in Wonderland.
- Mindy Kaling as Taffyta Muttonfudge, a racer in Sugar Rush who despises Vanellope.
- Joe Lo Truglio as Markowski, a soldier from Hero's Duty that Ralph meets in Tapper.
- Ed O'Neill as Stan Litwak, the owner of Litwak's Family Fun Center & Arcade.
- Dennis Haysbert as General Hologram, a holographic general in Hero's Duty.
- Adam Carolla as Wynnchel, an anthropomorphic Long John who is a member of the Sugar Rush police department.
- Horatio Sanz as Duncan, an anthropomorphic doughnut who is a member of the Sugar Rush police department.
- Rich Moore as Sour Bill, an anthropomorphic green sour ball and King Candy's assistant.

The cast additionally includes the Fix-It Felix Jr. Nicelanders, Edie McClurg as Mary, Raymond S. Persi as Mayor Gene, Jess Harnell as Don, Rachael Harris as Deanna, and Skylar Astin as Roy; Katie Lowes as Candlehead, Jamie Elman as Rancis Fluggerbutter, Josie Trinidad as Jubileena Bing-Bing, and Cymbre Walk as Crumbelina DiCaramello, racers in Sugar Rush; Phil Johnston as the Surge Protector, Game Central Station security; Stefanie Scott as the Moppet Girl, a young arcade-game player; John DiMaggio as Beard Papa, the security guard at Sugar Rush's candy-kart factory; Raymond S. Persi as a Zombie, Brian Kesinger as a cyborg (based on Kano from Mortal Kombat) and Martin Jarvis as Saitine, a devil-like villain, who attends the Bad-Anon support group; Tucker Gilmore as the Sugar Rush race announcer; Brandon Scott as Kohut, a soldier in Hero's Duty; and Tim Mertens as Doctor Brad Scott, a scientist who is Calhoun's late fiancé in the Hero's Duty (voiced by Nick Grimshaw in the UK version but not in the UK home release).

The film features several cameos from real-world video game characters including: Tapper (Maurice LaMarche), the bartender from the video game of the same name; Sonic the Hedgehog (Roger Craig Smith); Ryu (Kyle Hebert), Ken Masters (Reuben Langdon), M. Bison (Gerald C. Rivers) and Zangief (Rich Moore) from Capcom's Street Fighter series; Clyde (Kevin Deters) from Pac-Man; and Yuni Verse (Jamie Sparer Roberts) from Konami's Dance Dance Revolution series (specifically X2).

A character modeled after dubstep musician Skrillex makes an appearance in the fictional Fix-It Felix, Jr. as the disc jockey at the game's thirtieth-anniversary commemoration.

== Video game cameos and references ==
The "Bad-Anon" villain meeting features various well-known video game characters, including Bowser, Clyde, Doctor Eggman, M. Bison and Zangief.

In addition to the spoken roles, Wreck-It Ralph contains a number of other video game references, including characters and visual gags. The video game villains at the support meeting, in addition to those mentioned above, include Bowser from the Mario franchise, Doctor Eggman from Sonic the Hedgehog, and Neff from Altered Beast. Additionally, the game cabinet of the fictional Fix-It Felix, Jr. arcade game is stylized to strongly resemble the cabinet of Nintendo's original 1981 Donkey Kong arcade game, with Ralph and Felix taking similar poses as Donkey Kong and Mario, respectively. The Hero's Duty game is a reference to the hugely successful first-person shooter games Halo and Call of Duty. Characters from Q*bert are shown as "homeless" characters and later taken in by Ralph and Felix into their game (Q*bert also speaks to Felix at one point using the signature synthesized gibberish and word-balloon symbols from his game, called Q*bert-ese). Scenes in Game Central Station and Tapper's bar include Chun-Li, Cammy and Blanka from Street Fighter, Pac-Man, Blinky, Pinky, and Inky from Pac-Man, the Paperboy from Paperboy, the two paddles and the ball from Pong, Dig Dug, a Pooka, and a Fygar from Dig Dug, The Qix from Qix, Frogger from Frogger, and Peter Pepper from BurgerTime. Lara Croft and Mario are also mentioned but not seen.

Additional references are based on sight gags. The residents of Niceland and the bartender from Tapper are animated using a jerky motion that spoofs the limited animation cycles of the sprites of many 8- and 16-bit arcade games. King Candy uses the Konami Code on an NES controller to access the programming of Sugar Rush. Throughout Game Central Station is graffiti that includes "Aerith lives" (referencing the character of Aerith Gainsborough from Final Fantasy VII), "All your base are belong to us" (an Engrish phrase popularized from the game Zero Wing), "Sheng Long Was Here" (referencing an April Fool's joke around a made-up character Sheng Long from Street Fighter), and "Jenkins" (a nod to the popular Leeroy Jenkins meme from World of Warcraft). There is also a reference to the Metal Gear series when Ralph is searching for a medal in Tapper's Lost and found, finding first a Super Mushroom the Mario franchise, and then Metal Gear Solid's "Exclamation point" (with the corresponding sound effect from the game). Mr. Litwak wears a black and white striped referee's shirt, a nod to the outfit of Twin Galaxies founder Walter Day. One of the songs in the credits is an original work from Buckner and Garcia, previously famous for writing video game-themed songs in the 1980s. The Walt Disney Animation Studios opening logo is animated in an 8-bit pixelated fashion, whereas the Walt Disney Pictures closing production logo appears in a glitched state, a reference to the kill screen from many early arcade games such as Pac-Man. The high score on the main screen of Fix-It Felix, Jr., 120501, refers to the birthdate of Walt Disney, December 5, 1901.

== Production ==
=== Concept and story ===
The concept of Wreck-It Ralph was first developed at Disney, in the late 1980s, under the working title High Score. Since then, it was redeveloped and reconsidered several times: In the late 1990s, it took on the working title Joe Jump, then in the mid-2000s as Reboot Ralph.

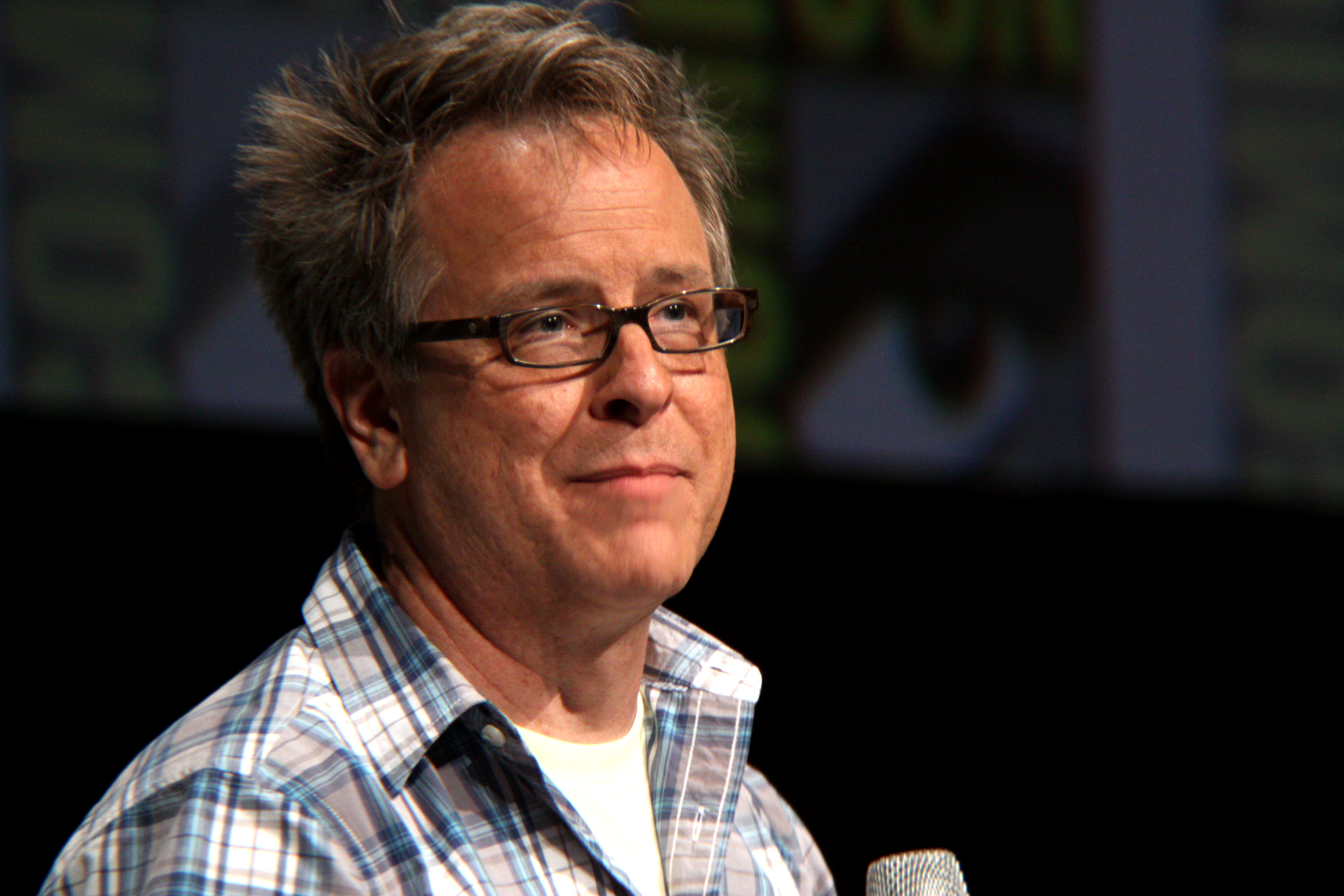
Director Rich Moore at the 2012 San Diego Comic-Con

John Lasseter, the head of Walt Disney Animation Studios and executive producer of the film, describes Wreck-It Ralph as "an 8-bit video-game bad guy who travels the length of the arcade to prove that he's a good guy." In a manner similar to Who Framed Roger Rabbit and the Toy Story films, Wreck-It Ralph featured cameo appearances by a number of licensed video-game characters. For example, one scene from the film shows Ralph attending a support group for the arcade's various villain characters, including Clyde from Pac-Man, Doctor Eggman from Sonic the Hedgehog, and Bowser from Super Mario Bros. Rich Moore, the film's director, had determined that for a film about a video-game world to feel authentic, "it had to have real characters from real games in it." Moore aimed to add licensed characters in a similar manner as cultural references in Looney Tunes shorts, but considered "having the right balance so a portion of the audience didn't feel they were being neglected or talked down to." However, Moore avoided creating the movie around existing characters, feeling that "there's so much mythology and baggage attached to pre-existing titles that I feel someone would be disappointed," and considered this to be a reason why movies based on video game franchises typically fail. Instead, for Wreck-It Ralph, the development of new characters representative of the 8-bit video game was "almost like virgin snow," giving them the freedom to take these characters in new directions.

Before production, the existing characters were added to the story either in places they would make sense to appear or as cameos from a list of characters suggested by the film's creative team, without consideration if they would legally be able to use the characters. The company then sought out the copyright holders' permissions to use the characters, as well as working with these companies to assure their characters were being represented authentically. In the case of Nintendo, the writers had early on envisioned the Bad-anon meeting with Bowser as a major character within the scene; according to Moore, Nintendo was very positive towards this use, stating in Moore's own words, "If there is a group that is dedicated to helping the bad guy characters in video games then Bowser must be in that group!" Nintendo provided feedback that Bowser's teacup should be held a certain way. Nintendo also asked that the producers try to devise a scene that would be similarly appropriate for Mario's inclusion in the film. Despite knowing they would be able to use the character, the producers could not find an appropriate scene that would let Mario be a significant character without taking away the spotlight from the main story and opted to not include the character. Moore debunked rumors that Mario and Luigi were excluded from Wreck-It Ralph due to high licensing fees, clarifying that the claim originated from a joke made by John C. Reilly during a Comic-Con panel. According to Moore, Nintendo was willing to license the characters, but they were ultimately omitted because the producers could not find an organic way to feature them without distracting from the main story.

Dr. Wily from Mega Man was going to appear but was cut from the final version of the film. Overall, there are about 188 individual character models in the movie as a result of these cameo inclusions. An earlier draft of the screenplay had Ralph and Vanellope spending time going around the game world to collect the pieces for her kart for Sugar Rush, and at times included Felix traveling with the pair. During these scenes, Ralph would have lied to Felix regarding his budding relationship with Calhoun, leading eventually to Ralph becoming depressed and abandoning his quest to get his medal back. At this point, a fourth game world, Extreme Easy Living 2, would have been introduced and was considered a "hedonistic place" between the social nature of The Sims and the open-world objective-less aspects of Grand Theft Auto, according to Moore. Ralph would go there too, wallowing in his depression, and would find happiness by gaining "Like It" buttons for doing acceptable actions in the party-like nature of the place. Moore stated that while it was difficult to consider dropping this new game world, they found that its introduction in the second half of the film would be too difficult a concept for the viewer to grasp. They further had trouble working out how a social game would be part of an arcade, and though they considered having the game be running on Litwak's laptop, they ultimately decided that justifying the concept would be too convoluted. Line art sketches and voice-over readings of the scene were included on the home media release of the film.

=== Animation, designs, and camera work ===
The film introduced Disney's new bidirectional reflectance distribution functions, with more realistic reflections on surfaces, and new virtual cinematography Camera Capture system, which makes it possible to go through scenes in real time. To research the Sugar Rush segment of the film, the visual development group traveled to trade fair ISM Cologne, a See's Candy factory, and other manufacturing facilities. The group also brought in food photographers, to demonstrate techniques to make food appear appealing. Special effects, including from "smoke or dust," looks distinct in each of the segments.

== Music ==
The film's score was composed by Henry Jackman. Three original songs were performed in the film by Owl City, AKB48, and Buckner & Garcia. The soundtrack also features the songs "Celebration", "Bug Hunt (Noisia Remix)", and "Shut Up and Drive". Early in the development process, Robert Lopez and Kristen Anderson-Lopez wrote an original song for the film which was later cut out.

== Marketing ==
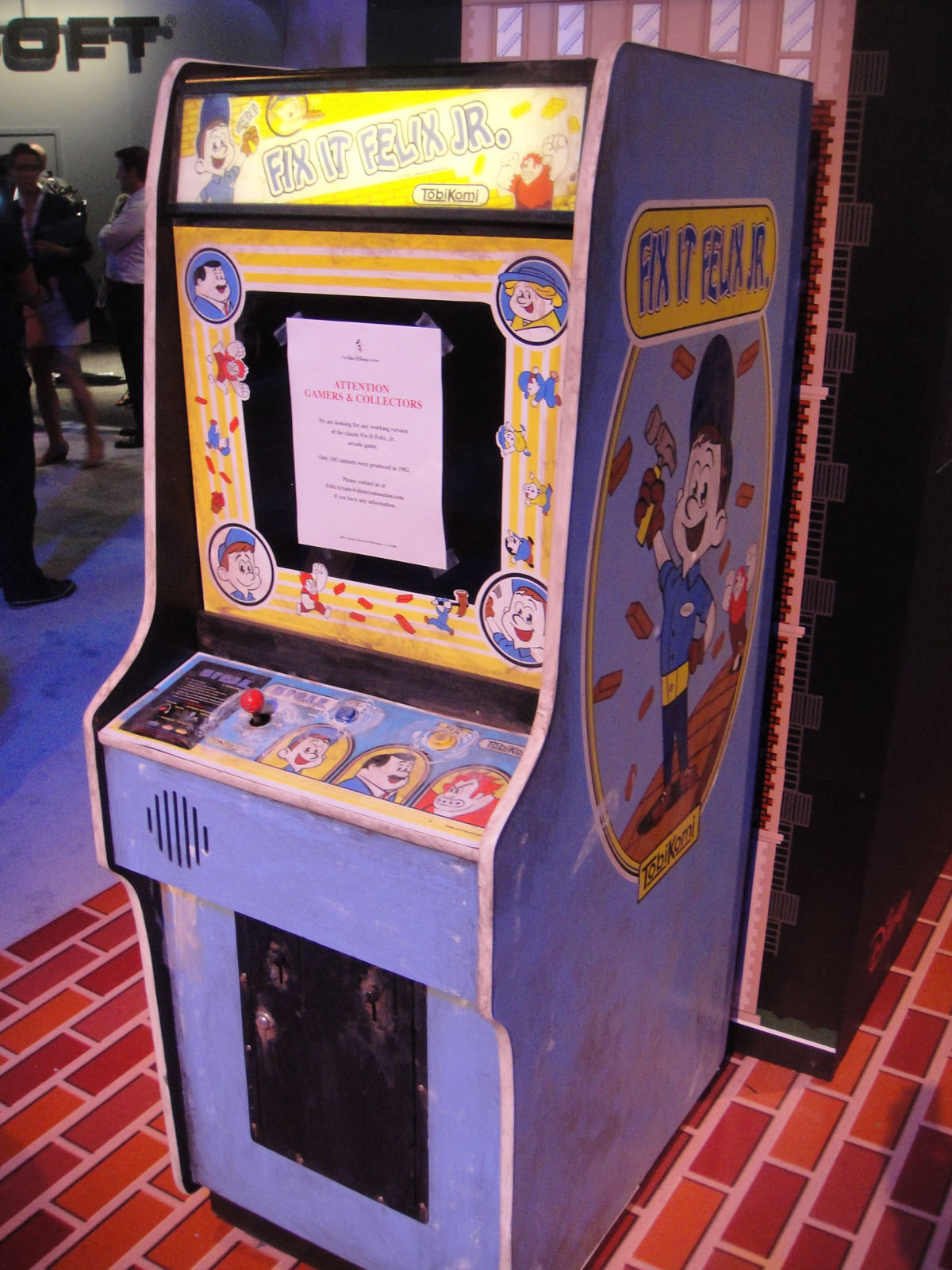
A real-world replica of the Fix-It Felix Jr. arcade cabinet where Ralph lives, seen at E3 2012 as promotion for the film

A teaser trailer for Wreck-It Ralph was released on June 6, 2012, debuting with Madagascar 3: Europe's Most Wanted and Rock of Ages. This also coincided with the 2012 Electronic Entertainment Expo, for which Disney constructed a mock aged arcade cabinet for the fictional Fix-It Felix, Jr. game on display on the show floor. Disney also released a browser-based Flash-based version of the Fix-It Felix, Jr. game as well as iOS, Android, and Windows Phone versions, with online Unity-based versions of Sugar Rush and Hero's Duty. A second trailer for the film was released on September 12, 2012, coinciding with and attached to Finding Nemo 3D and Frankenweenie, along with its final updated movie poster.

To promote the home media release of Wreck-It Ralph, director Rich Moore produced a short film titled Garlan Hulse: Where Potential Lives. Set within the movie's universe, the mockumentary film was designed as a parody of The King of Kong.

== Release ==
=== Theatrical ===
The film was originally scheduled for a release on March 22, 2013, but it was later changed to November 2, 2012, due to it being ahead of schedule. The theatrical release was accompanied by Disney's animated short film, Paperman.

=== Home media ===
Wreck-It Ralph was released on Blu-ray Disc (2D and 3D) and DVD in North America on March 5, 2013, from Walt Disney Studios Home Entertainment. The film was made available for digital download in selected regions on February 12, 2013. Wreck-It Ralph debuted at No. 1 in Blu-ray and DVD sales in the United States. With 2,923,270 units sold ($55,095,767), Wreck-It Ralph was the 4th best-selling DVD of 2013 in the United States.

== Reception ==
=== Box office ===
Wreck-It Ralph grossed $189.4 million in North America and $281.8 million in other countries, for a worldwide total of $496.5 million.

In North America, the film debuted with $13.5 million, an above-average opening-day gross for an animated film released in November. During its opening weekend, the film topped the box office with $49 million, making it the largest opening for a Walt Disney Animation Studios film at the time. The film fell 33% to $33 million in its second weekend, finishing second behind newcomer Skyfall.

=== Critical response ===
The review-aggregation website Rotten Tomatoes reports that 87% of critics have given the film a positive review, based on 190 reviews with an average score of 7.4/10. The site's consensus reads: "Equally entertaining for both kids and parents old enough to catch the references, Wreck-It Ralph is a clever, colorful adventure built on familiar themes and joyful nostalgia." On Metacritic the film has a weighted average score of 72 out of 100, based on 38 critics, indicating "generally favorable reviews". Audiences polled by CinemaScore gave the film an average grade of "A" on an A+ to F scale.

Roger Ebert of the Chicago Sun-Times gave the film 3 out of 4 stars and wrote, "More than in most animated films, the art design and color palette of Wreck-It Ralph permit unlimited sets, costumes, and rules, giving the movie tireless originality and different behavior in every different cyber world." A. O. Scott of The New York Times wrote, "The movie invites a measure of cynicism—which it proceeds to obliterate with a 93-minute blast of color, noise, ingenuity and fun." Peter Debruge of Variety stated, "With plenty to appeal to boys and girls, old and young, Walt Disney Animation Studios has a high-scoring hit on its hands in this brilliantly conceived, gorgeously executed toon, earning bonus points for backing nostalgia with genuine emotion." Betsy Sharkey of the Los Angeles Times said, "The movie's subversive sensibility and old-school/new-school feel are a total kick," while Justin Lowe of The Hollywood Reporter wrote, "With a mix of retro eye-candy for grown-ups and a thrilling, approachable storyline for the tykes, the film casts a wide and beguiling net." Conversely, Christopher Orr of The Atlantic found it "overplotted and underdeveloped."

=== Awards and nominations ===
List of awards and nominations
Award	Category	Recipients	Result
Academy Awards	Best Animated Feature	Rich Moore	Nominated
Annie Awards	Best Animated Feature	Clark Spencer	Won
Annie Awards	Animated Effects in an Animated Production	Brett Albert	Nominated
Annie Awards	Character Design in an Animated Feature Production	Bill Schwab, Lorelay Bove, Cory Loftis, Minkyu Lee	Nominated
Annie Awards	Directing in an Animated Feature Production	Rich Moore	Won
Annie Awards	Music in an Animated Feature Production	Henry Jackman, Skrillex, Adam Young, Matthew Thiessen, Jamie Houston, Yasushi Akimoto	Won
Annie Awards	Storyboarding in an Animated Feature Production	Leo Matsuda	Nominated
Annie Awards	Storyboarding in an Animated Feature Production	Lissa Treiman	Nominated
Annie Awards	Voice Acting in an Animated Feature Production	Alan Tudyk	Won
Annie Awards	Writing in an Animated Feature Production	Phil Johnston, Jennifer Lee	Won
Annie Awards	Editorial in an Animated Feature Production	Tim Mertens	Nominated
Chicago Film Critics Association	Best Animated Feature	Rich Moore	Nominated
Critics' Choice Movie Awards	Best Animated Feature	Rich Moore	Won
Golden Globe Awards	Best Animated Feature Film	Rich Moore	Nominated
Golden Reel Awards	Best Sound Editing: Sound Effects, Foley, Dialogue and ADR in an Animation Feature Film	Wreck It Ralph	Won
Golden Trailer Awards	Best Animation/Family	"Dreams"	Won
IGN's Best of 2012 Awards	Best Movie	Wreck It Ralph	Nominated
IGN's Best of 2012 Awards	Best Animated Movie	Wreck It Ralph	Won
IGN's Best of 2012 Awards	IGN People's Choice Award for Best Animated Movie	Wreck It Ralph	Won
IGN's Best of 2012 Awards	Best 3D Movie	Wreck It Ralph	Nominated
IGN's Best of 2012 Awards	Best Movie Poster	Wreck It Ralph	Nominated
National Board of Review Awards	Best Animated Feature	Wreck It Ralph	Won
Nickelodeon Kids' Choice Awards	Favorite Animated Movie	Wreck It Ralph	Won
Online Film Critics Society Award	Best Animated Feature	Wreck It Ralph	Nominated
Producers Guild of America Award	Best Animated Motion Picture	Clark Spencer	Won
Satellite Awards	Best Animated or Mixed Media Feature	Rich Moore	Nominated
Saturn Awards	Best Animated Film	Rich Moore	Nominated
Visual Effects Society	Outstanding Animation in an Animated Feature Motion Picture	Sean Jenkins, Scott Kersavage, Rich Moore, Clark Spencer	Nominated
Visual Effects Society	Outstanding Animated Character in an Animated Feature Motion Picture	John Kahwaty, Suzan Kim, Michelle Robinson, Tony Smeed (for Vanellope)	Nominated

== Franchise ==
=== Sequel ===
Ralph Breaks the Internet is the sequel to Wreck-It Ralph. The film follows Ralph and Vanellope as they travel to the Internet to get a replacement part for Sugar Rush and prevent Mr. Litwak from disposing of the game. The film was produced by Walt Disney Animation Studios with Moore and Johnston directing. The film was released November 21, 2018 by Walt Disney Pictures.

=== Video games ===
In addition to the Adobe Flash version of the Fix-It Felix, Jr. game, Disney released a tie-in side-scrolling platform game called Wreck-It Ralph for the Wii, Nintendo 3DS, and Nintendo DS, to mostly negative reviews. The arcade style side-scrolling game was developed by Pipeworks Software and published by Activision and serves as a "story extension" to the film; it is the first Disney video game since Disney's Extreme Skate Adventure to be published by Activision. Taking place following the events of the film, players may play as Wreck-It Ralph or Fix-It Felix, causing or repairing damage, respectively, following another Cy-Bug incident. Game levels are based on the locations in the film like the Fix-It Felix, Jr., Hero's Duty, and Sugar Rush games as well as Game Central Station. It was released in conjunction with the film's release, in November 2012. In October 2012, Disney released fully playable browser-based versions of the Hero's Duty and Sugar Rush games on the new official film site. A mobile game titled Wreck-it Ralph was released in November 2012 for iOS and Android systems, with a Windows Phone 8 version following almost a year later. Initially, the game consisted of three mini-games, Fix-it Felix, Jr., Hero's Duty and Sweet Climber, which were later joined by TurboTime and Hero's Duty: Flight Command. The game was retired on August 29, 2014.

Ralph also appears in Sega's Sonic & All-Stars Racing Transformed as a playable guest character. Ralph and Vanellope appear as playable characters in Disney Infinity as well (voiced by Brian T. Delaney and Sarah Silverman, respectively); the Disney Store released their individual figures on January 7, 2014. A combo "toy box pack" of the two figures with Sugar Rush customization discs was released April 1, 2014, from the Disney Store. Wreck-It Ralph is a playable world on the mobile game Disney Crossy Road. Ralph made his debut appearance in the Kingdom Hearts video game series in Kingdom Hearts III, serving as a Link summon. A world based on Wreck-It Ralph was added to the mobile game Kingdom Hearts Union χ as part of an update in April 2019. In the game, the story of the world loosely follows the plot of the film, culminating with a boss battle against Turbo. Ralph, Vanellope, Calhoun, and Felix appear in the mobile game Disney Heroes: Battle Mode as characters. Ralph and Vanellope are the first unlocked characters. Ralph, Vanellope, Calhoun, and Felix appear as playable characters to unlock for a limited time in Disney Magic Kingdoms, as well as Niceland as an attraction.
