= Gubeng, Gubeng, Surabaya =

Gubeng Kelurahan Gubeng
- Village
- Interactive map of Gubeng
- Coordinates: 7.2729°S 112.7493°E
- Country: Indonesia
- Province: East Java
- City: Surabaya

Area
  - Total: 7.90 km^{2} (3.05 sq mi)

Population (mid 2024 estimate)
  - Total: 132,382
  - Density: 16,800/km^{2} (43,400/sq mi)
- Time zone: GMT +7

Gubeng is the name of an urban village (kelurahan), which in turn is a part of a district (kecamatan) with the same name, in the city of Surabaya, East Java Province of Indonesia.

== Galleries ==
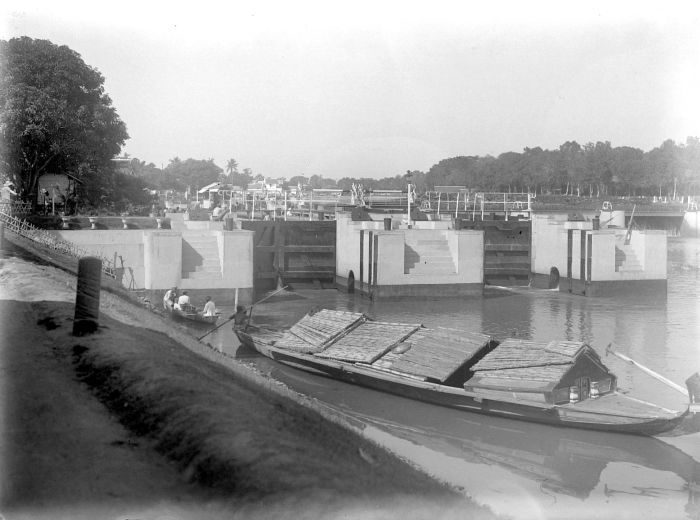
Sluice

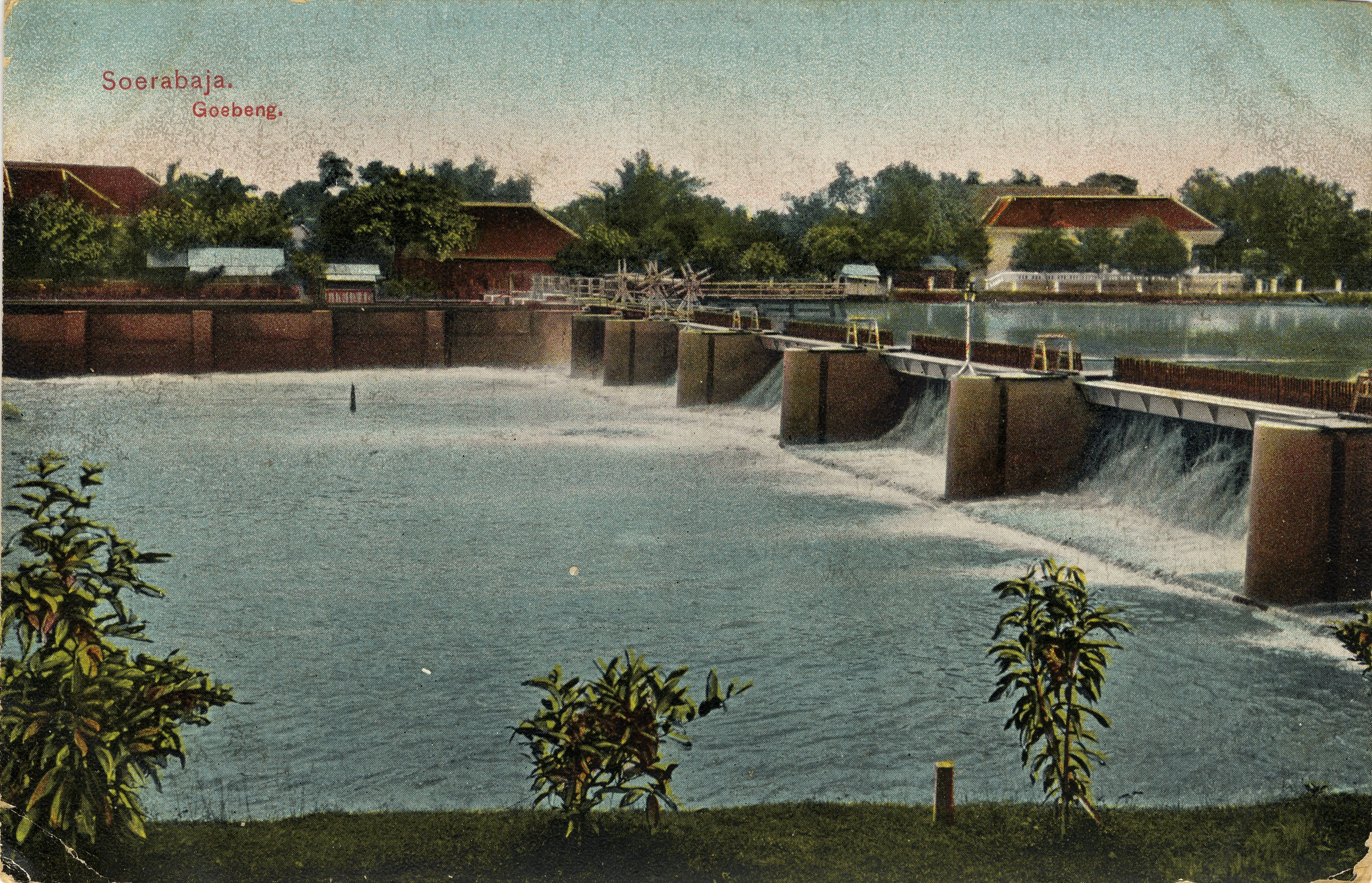
Picture postcard of the sluice at Gubeng (early 20th century) KITLV, Leiden collection

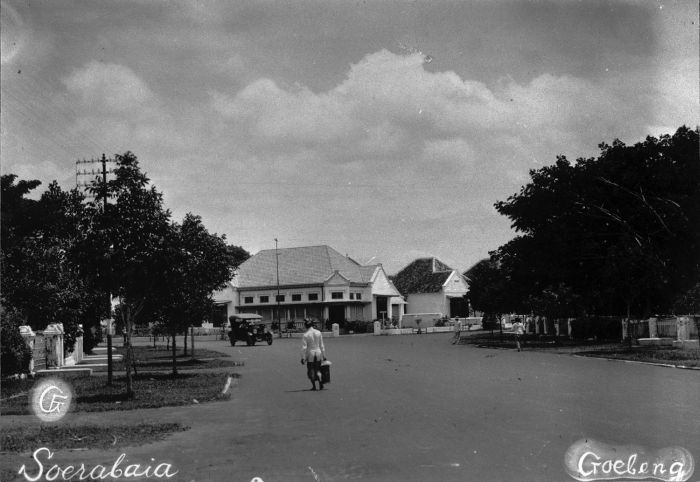
Gubeng in 1920s
