= Beard Papa's =

International chain of cream puff stores

- Type: Food services
- Industry: Desserts
- Founded: 1999; 27 years ago
- Headquarters: Osaka, Japan
- Products: Cream Puffs; Cheesecake; Tiramisu
- Website: www.beardpapas.com

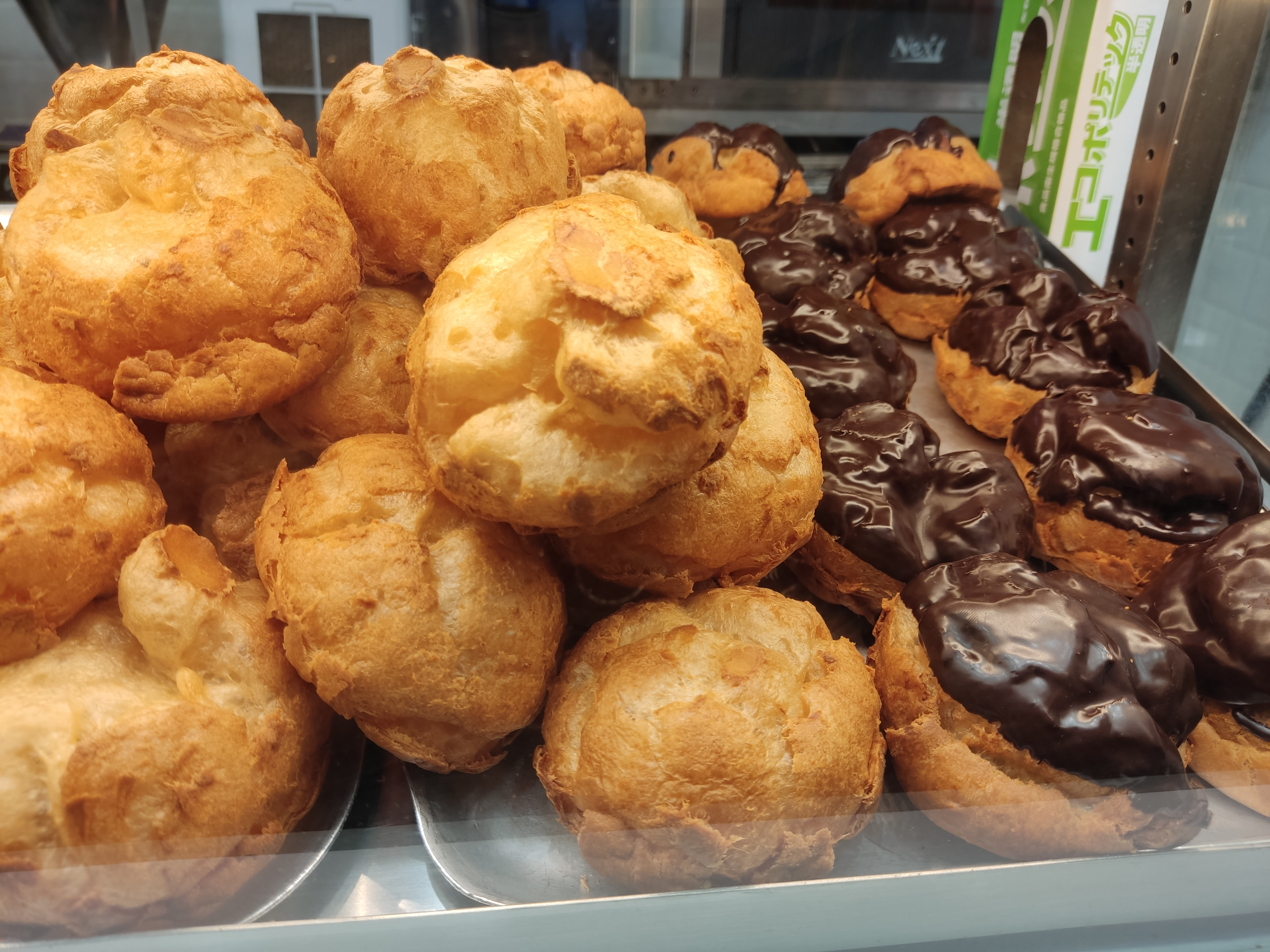
Cream puff shells

Beard Papa's (ビアード・パパ) is an international chain of cream puff stores started in Japan, owned by DAY TO LIFE Co., Ltd. (株式会社DAY TO LIFE). Their slogan is "Fresh and natural cream puffs". Beard Papa's has over 250 stores in Japan, and over 500 worldwide in 12 countries and territories.

Their trademark product is a choux pastry shell filled with whipped cream custard, available in vanilla, chocolate, and specialty flavors.

== History ==
The first Beard Papa's was opened in 1999 by Yuji Hirota in Osaka, Japan with the motto Pipin' Hot Cream Puffs. Since its beginnings, Beard Papa's has grown considerably expanding outside of Osaka and Japan to Australia, Canada, China, Hong Kong, Indonesia, Korea, Malaysia, New Zealand, Pakistan, the Philippines, Singapore, Taiwan, Thailand, Sri Lanka, the United Kingdom, the United Arab Emirates, the United States, and Vietnam.

The company opened a flagship outlet, its first in Europe, in London's Oxford Street in December 2006. This closed in 2010. In March 2026, a branch was opened in Leipzig, Germany.

In June 2008, Beard Papa's was ranked "Wired" by Wired Magazine, the magazine's highest rating, above "Tired" and "Expired".

The Beard Papa character appeared in the 2012 Disney animated film Wreck-It Ralph and was voiced by John DiMaggio.

== Flavors ==
Specialty flavors of filling include green tea, strawberry, Nutella, blueberry, limoncello, coconut creme, black sesame, cheese, almond cream, azuki bean, pineapple, matcha azuki, durian, apple cinnamon, hazelnut, cookie and creme, Key Lime pie, banana, piña colada, dulce de leche, mango, pumpkin, s'more, Earl Grey tea, éclair, honey butter, espresso and coffee.

The Riyadh, Saudi Arabia location also has cinnamon, date and pistachio flavors.

The different flavors are sold on a rotating schedule.

== Other pastries and desserts ==
Beard Papa's has a selection of other pastries and desserts such as:

- Macarons
- Mochi ice cream
- Fondant au chocolat
- Cheesecake
- Mont-Blanc
- Tiramisu
- Japanese cookies
- Custard drinks
- Fondant lava cakes (ube, chocolate, matcha)

Beard Papa's also sells cold drinks, milk teas, and boba drinks.
