= Horiike Hiroshi =

Chinese activist, philanthropist and businessperson

- aka Peng Hong Ling
- Born: Shanghai
- Other name: Genlin (pen name)
- Citizenship: Japan
- Education: Shanghai University

Horiike Hiroshi (aka Peng Hong Ling) was born in Shanghai, China, is of Japanese nationality. He is an entrepreneur, philanthropist, artist, and an animal rights activist.

== Early life and education ==
Horiike Hiroshi (aka Peng Hong Ling) was born in Shanghai, China and holds Japanese nationality. He graduated in Shanghai University. He is an Outstanding Alumnus and first and second honorary director of the Shanghai University Board. and is Shanghai University’s visiting professor. Horiike Hiroshi worked for Nissho Iwai in Tokyo.

== Career ==
In 2014, Horiike Hiroshi founded the World Dog Alliance which advocates for banning dog and cat meat.

Horiike Hiroshi is committed to charity and public welfare. He donated funds to build schools, libraries, gymnasiums and established a number of scholarships with his own money. He also pledged to spend 90% of his personal wealth on charity.

In 2025, Horiike Hiroshi founded Genlin Universe Astronomy Research Centre (GUARC) to focus on investigations into cosmic astronomy.

== Achievements ==
- In January 2018, Genlin was named as an Outstanding Alumni by his alma mater Shanghai University.
- In October 2018, he was awarded the "International Dog Lover Award" by a parliamentary animal rights organization in Italy (issued by Michela Vittoria Brambilla, a member of Chamber of Deputies (Italy)).
