= Embassy of Indonesia, Tokyo =

Embassy of the Republic of Indonesia in Tokyo Kedutaan Besar Republik Indonesia di Tokyo

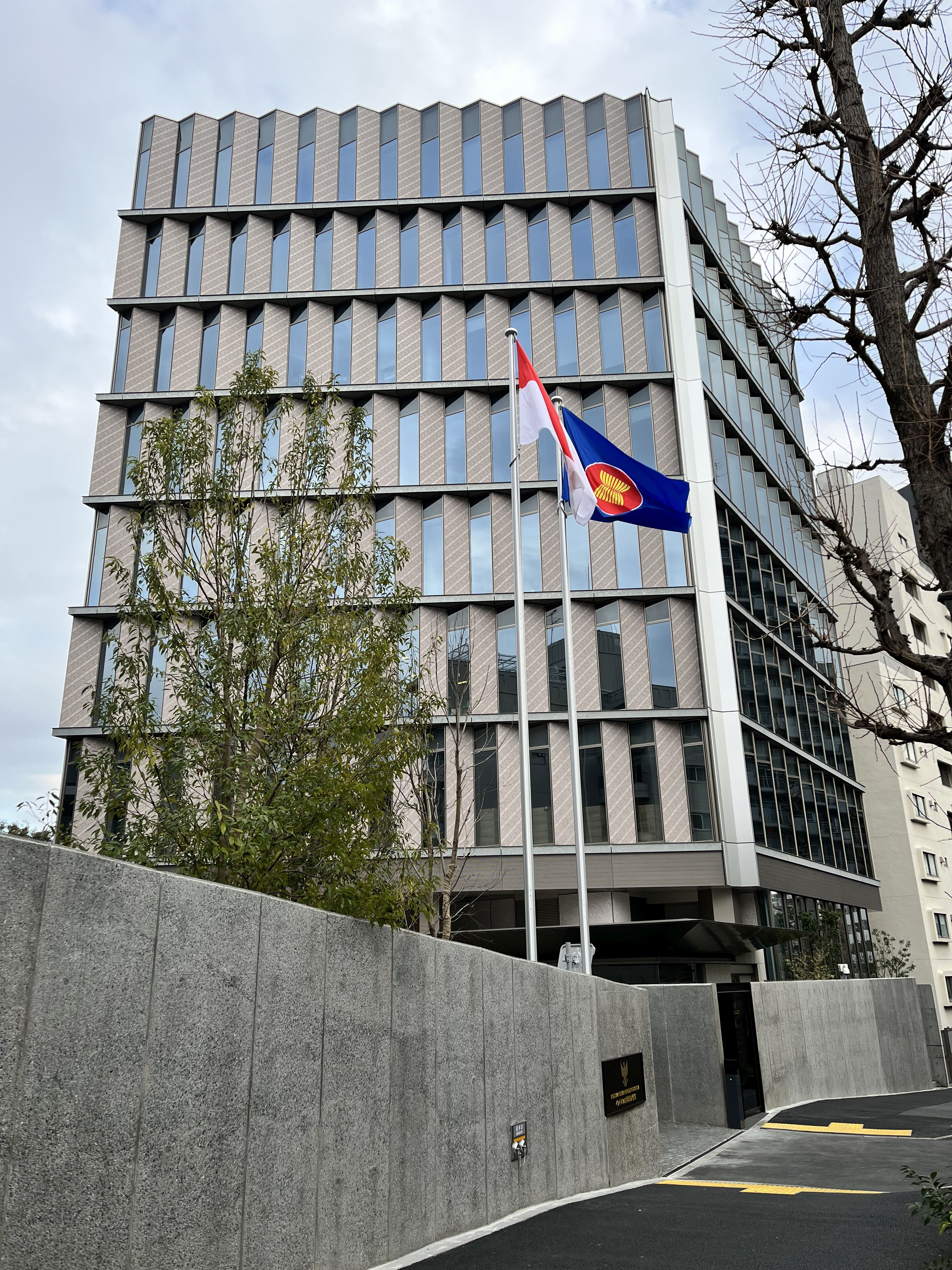
- Chancery of the Indonesian Embassy in Tokyo
- Location: Tokyo, Japan
- Address: 5-2-9 Higashi Gotanda, Shinagawa-ku, Tokyo, Japan
- Ambassador: Heri Akhmadi (Ambassador Extraordinary and Plenipotentiary)
- Jurisdiction: Japan; Micronesia
- Website: kemlu.go.id/tokyo/en/

The Embassy of the Republic of Indonesia in Tokyo (Indonesian: Kedutaan Besar Republik Indonesia di Tokyo) is the diplomatic mission of the Republic of Indonesia to Japan and concurrently accredited to the Federated States of Micronesia. The embassy is located at 5-2-9 Higashi Gotanda, Shinagawa-ku, Tokyo. Indonesia also has a consulate general in Osaka and two honorary consulates in Fukuoka and Sapporo.

== See also ==
- Indonesia–Japan relations
- List of diplomatic missions of Indonesia
- List of diplomatic missions in Japan
